= Tropical Storm Gert (2005) =

Atlantic tropical storm in 2005

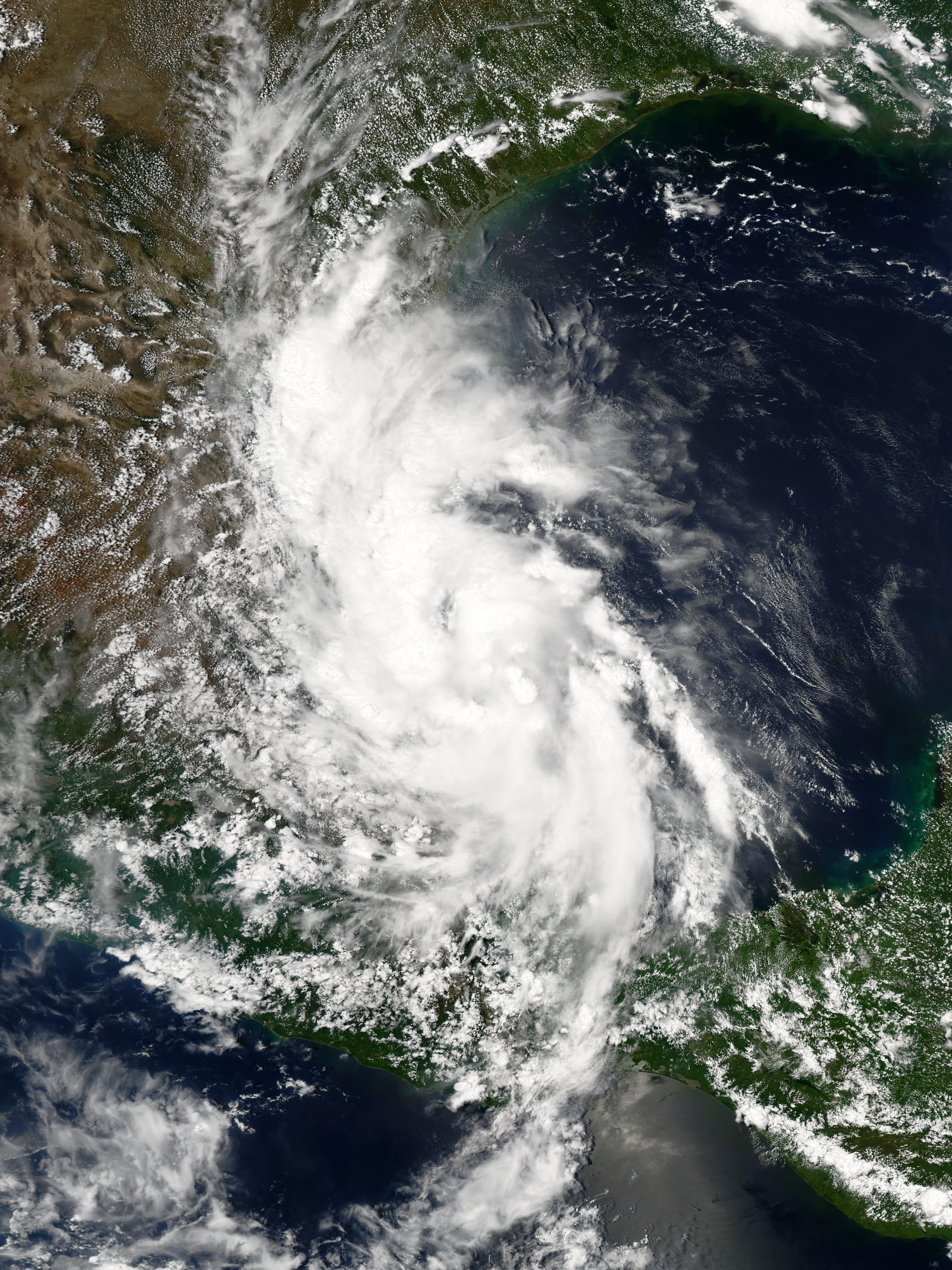
- Tropical Storm Gert approaching Veracruz on July 24

Meteorological history
- Formed: July 23, 2005
- Dissipated: July 25, 2005

Tropical storm
- 1-minute sustained (SSHWS/NWS)
- Highest winds: 45 mph (75 km/h)
- Lowest pressure: 1005 mbar (hPa); 29.68 inHg

Overall effects
- Fatalities: 1 direct
- Damage: $6 million (2005 USD)
- Areas affected: Mexico
- IBTrACS
- Part of the 2005 Atlantic hurricane season

Tropical Storm Gert was the fourth of seven tropical cyclones (4 hurricanes, two major hurricanes, and four tropical storms) to make landfall in Mexico during 2005. It formed in July in the Bay of Campeche, becoming the seventh named storm of the 2005 Atlantic hurricane season.

As a tropical wave, Gert crossed Honduras and the Yucatán peninsula before organizing into Tropical Depression Seven on the afternoon of July 23 in the Bay of Campeche. It was upgraded to Tropical Storm Gert early the next day, gaining the record for the earliest formation of a seventh named storm in an Atlantic hurricane season. That record would later be broken by Tropical Storm Gonzalo in 2020. Gert strengthened little before making landfall south of Tampico, Tamaulipas, late on July 24, with maximum sustained winds of 45 mph (70 km/h) and a minimum central pressure of 1005 mbar (29.68 inHg). It moved inland over central Mexico before dissipating on the next day. Gert struck in approximately the same area as Hurricane Emily just four days earlier, causing fear of flooding and landslides due to saturated lands. As a precaution, some 1,000 people were evacuated from low-lying residences and businesses near the towns of Naranjos Amatlán and Tamiahua.

== Meteorological history ==
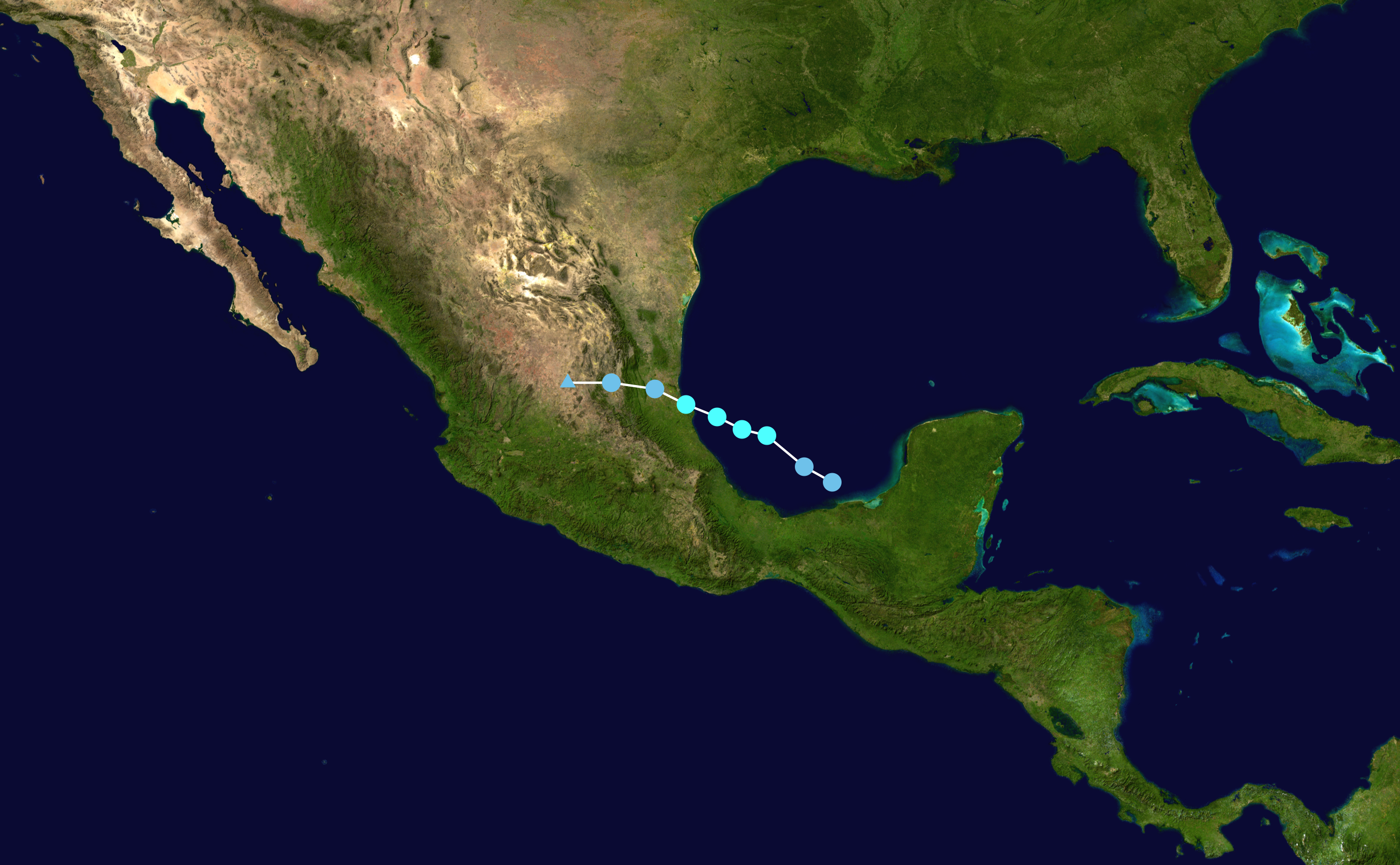
Map plotting the storm's track and intensity, according to the Saffir–Simpson scale Map key Saffir–Simpson scale Tropical depression (≤38 mph, ≤62 km/h) Tropical storm (39–73 mph, 63–118 km/h) Category 1 (74–95 mph, 119–153 km/h) Category 2 (96–110 mph, 154–177 km/h) Category 3 (111–129 mph, 178–208 km/h) Category 4 (130–156 mph, 209–251 km/h) Category 5 (≥157 mph, ≥252 km/h) Unknown Storm type Tropical cyclone Subtropical cyclone Extratropical cyclone, remnant low, tropical disturbance, or monsoon depression

A tropical wave entered the Atlantic Ocean from Africa on July 10, and the wave developed into an area of low pressure while passing over Cape Verde. Despite the organization, the low failed to develop into a tropical cyclone due to cool waters on the sea surface and wind shear. However, those unfavorable conditions did not completely destroy the wave, as it continued traveling westward through the Lesser Antilles until July 18. That day, while south of Puerto Rico, the wave split in two; the northern half moved northwest and developed into Tropical Storm Franklin over the Bahamas, and the southern half continued westward, with its associated thunderstorm activity increasing.

On July 22, a new low pressure area developed while the tropical wave was located over the Gulf of Honduras. However, this area of disturbed weather was unable to develop further, because the storm quickly moved over the Yucatán Peninsula. After its one-day passage through the peninsula, the system entered the Bay of Campeche, but lacked any deep convection. This time, though, the wave quickly developed the deep convection it needed to become a tropical cyclone. In part, this was due to the Sierra Madre Oriental enhancing large-scale rotation of the disturbance by forcing air to flow parallel to the mountain range, instead of through it. As a result, the National Hurricane Center in Miami, Florida designated it as Tropical Depression Seven, just 255 miles east-southeast of Tuxpan, Mexico. Early on the July 24, the cyclone was upgraded to a tropical storm with winds of 40 mph (65 km/h) and received the name Gert.

Gert continued to move northwest after becoming a tropical storm, and reached a peak intensity of 45 mph (70 km/h) and a minimum central pressure of 1005 mbar (29.68 inHg). Gert made landfall just 6 miles (10 km) to the southeast of Pánuco, still at peak intensity, at 10:00 p.m. CDT (00:00 July 25, UTC). However, due to its interaction with land, the storm quickly weakened back to a tropical depression strength early on July 25, and became a remnant low twelve hours after that. Six hours later, just a day after it made landfall, it dissipated over the mountains of central Mexico.

== Preparations ==
The track of Tropical Storm Gert was slightly more to the north than the National Hurricane Center's initial predictions, giving the storm more time to develop. As a result, the NHC predicted that Gert could intensify further, but this did not occur. The primary emphasis of the forecasts was on the impact the rainfall from Gert could cause, particularly on this area of Mexico, which had been hit previously in the season by other hurricanes.

On July 23, the Mexican Servicio Meteorológico Nacional (National Weather Service) issued a tropical storm warning for the eastern Mexican Gulf coast between Palma Sola and Cabo Rojo, as soon as Tropical Depression Seven formed. At that time, a tropical storm watch was issued from Cabo Rojo northward, until reaching La Cruz. That same day, the government of Veracruz declared a state of emergency in 24 municipalities of the state, making money from the National Disaster Fund available to those affected by the storm. As Gert came closer to the coast, the tropical storm warning was extended northwards to La Cruz, and then to La Pesca, but it was canceled shortly after landfall.

Tropical Storm Gert struck just south of where Category 3 Hurricane Emily had struck, and where Tropical Storm Bret hit in late June. As a result, there were concerns that serious flooding and mudslides would result due to saturated ground. As a precaution, about 1,000 people were evacuated from low-lying residences and businesses near the towns of Naranjos Amatlán and Tamiahua in Veracruz, and about 6,000 throughout Tamaulipas.

== Impact ==
The highest 24-hour rainfall reports were 214.9 mm (8.46 in) in Tamuin, San Luis Potosí, and 185.2 mm (7.29 in) in Tamesi, Tamaulipas. In Veracruz, the highest precipitation reading associated with Gert was 117 mm, (4.61 in) in El Higo. However, damage overall was minimal, amounting to $6 million (2005 USD, $60 million 2005 MXN), and there was only one reported fatality, from a man who was carried away by the La Silla River when he was pushing a stalled car across the flooded stream.

=== Tamaulipas ===
According to the government of Tamaulipas, most of the damage in the state was in farmland and in residents' dwellings, primarily near Matamoros, Valle Hermoso, Reynosa and San Fernando. In Matamoros, part of the city lost power and running water; in Valle Hermoso, two schools were damaged; in Reynosa, 180 people were evacuated from low-lying areas in five districts of the city, while in San Fernando, the main highway through the city was closed, and traffic on the bridge over the Conchos River was restricted to one lane.

In Mier, the spillway of the Las Blancas Dam was overtopped, causing a river bridge to be destroyed and electric power to be lost, as well. In Río Bravo, 50 families were evacuated as seven collective farms became hard to reach by road; approximately 90% of the residences in the farms were affected by the storm. In Altamira, 200 families were evacuated as well, and relocated to seven shelters. Also, in the municipalities of Burgos, Cruillas, and Méndez there was flooding in collective farms and family dwellings. Overall, the municipalities of Mier, Reynosa, Río Bravo, Valle Hermoso, Matamoros, San Fernando, San Carlos, Burgos, Cruillas, Méndez, Soto la Marina, Mante and Altamira were affected in the state, losing potable water and electricity.

After the storm, the state government promised to take the necessary steps to prevent an outbreak of dengue and West Nile virus; however, by June 29, there had already been 187 cases of classic dengue, and 29 of hemorrhagic dengue, up from 8 cases two years before, and none the previous year.

=== Nuevo León ===
In Nuevo León, about 6,000 residents who lived near the Conchos, Guayalejo, and Grande Rivers were evacuated from their residences across the state. Also, the precipitation from Gert caused about 100 collective farms to become isolated from the rest of the state in the municipality of Montemorelos. In the city, one building was evacuated, as a 100 ft (30 m) fissure appeared on the ground near the structure.

In the municipalities of San Vicente Tancuayalab, Valles and Ebano, 100 people were evacuated.

== See also ==
- Other storms of the same name
- Tropical Storm Bret (2005)
- Tropical Storm Arlene (2011)
- Tropical Storm Dolly (2014)
