= 9th federal electoral district of Tamaulipas =

Defunct federal electoral district of Mexico

Coordinates: 26°05′N 98°17′W

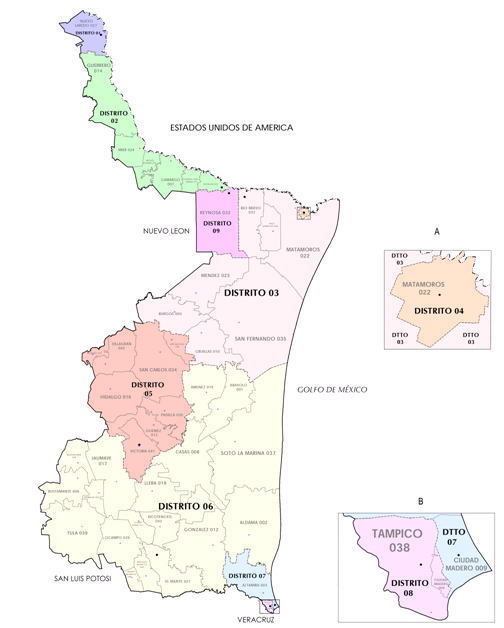
9th district in 2017–2022

The 9th federal electoral district of Tamaulipas (Spanish: Distrito electoral federal 09 de Tamaulipas) is a defunct federal electoral district of the Mexican state of Tamaulipas. It was in existence from 1978 to 1996 and again from 2017 to 2022.

During those periods, it returned one deputy to the Chamber of Deputies for each three-year legislative session by means of the first-past-the-post system. Votes cast in the district also counted towards the calculation of proportional representation ("plurinominal") deputies elected from the country's electoral regions.

The 9th district was first created as part of the 1977 electoral reforms, which increased the state's seat allocation from six to nine. Because of shifting population dynamics, it was subsequently abolished in 1996, re-established in 2017, and abolished again in 2023.

== District territory ==
Evolution of electoral district numbers
	1974	1978	1996	2005	2017	2023
Tamaulipas	6	9	8	8	9	8
Chamber of Deputies	196	300				

2017–2022

In its final form, the 9th district was located in the north of the state. Its head town (cabecera distrital), where results from individual polling stations were gathered together and tallied, was the city of Reynosa and it covered 221 electoral precincts (secciones electorales) in the south of the municipality of Reynosa. The remainder of the municipality was assigned to the 2nd district.

1996–2017

Between 1996 and 2017, Tamaulipas's seat allocation was reduced to eight.

1978–1996

Tamaulipas's seat allocation rose from six to nine under the 1977 electoral reforms, which increased the number of single-member seats in the Chamber of Deputies from 196 to 300. The newly created 9th district's head town was at Ciudad Mante and it covered six municipalities in the south of the state:
- Antiguo Morelos, Gómez Farías, Mante, Nuevo Morelos, Ocampo and Xicoténcatl.

== Deputies returned to Congress ==
(Mexico) National parties
- Current
- PAN
- PRI
- PT
- PVEM
- MC
- Morena
- Defunct or local only
- PLM
- PNR
- PRM
- PNM
- PP
- PPS
- PARM
- PFCRN
- Convergencia
- PANAL
- PSD
- PES
- PES
- PRD

Tamaulipas's 9th district
Election	Deputy	Party	Term	Legislature
1979	Enrique Fernández Pérez	Institutional Revolutionary Party	1979–1982	51st Congress
1982	Martha Chávez Padrón	Institutional Revolutionary Party	1982–1985	52nd Congress
1985	Aureliano Caballero González	Institutional Revolutionary Party	1985–1988	53rd Congress
1988	Raúl García Leal	Institutional Revolutionary Party	1988–1991	54th Congress
1991	Arturo Horacio Saavedra Sánchez	Institutional Revolutionary Party	1991–1994	55th Congress
1994	Leticia Camero Gómez	Institutional Revolutionary Party	1994–1997	56th Congress
The 9th district was suspended between 1996 and 2017
2018	Armando Javier Zertuche Zuani (Note: Originally elected for Morena, Zertuche Zuani switched to the PT on 3 September 2019.)	National Regeneration Movement Labour Party (Mexico)	2018–2021	64th Congress
2021	Claudia Alejandra Hernández Sáenz (Note: Originally elected for the PT, Hernández Sáenz switched to Morena on 7 September 2021.)	Labour Party (Mexico) National Regeneration Movement	2021–2024	65th Congress
The 9th district was suspended in 2023

== Presidential elections ==
Tamaulipas's 9th district
Election	District won by	Party or coalition	%
2018	Andrés Manuel López Obrador	Juntos Haremos Historia	60.4495
