= Municipalities of Tamaulipas =

List of municipalities of Mexican state

Map of Mexico with Tamaulipas highlighted

Tamaulipas is a state in northeast Mexico that is divided into 43 municipalities. According to the 2020 INEGI census, it is the fourteenth most populated state with 3,527,735 inhabitants and the sixth largest by land area spanning 80,249.3 square kilometres (30,984.4 sq mi).

Municipalities in Tamaulipas are administratively autonomous of the state according to the 115th article of the 1917 Constitution of Mexico. Every three years, citizens elect a municipal president (Spanish: presidente municipal) by a plurality voting system who heads a concurrently elected municipal council (ayuntamiento) responsible for providing all the public services for their constituents. The municipal council consists of a variable number of trustees and councillors (regidores y síndicos). Municipalities are responsible for public services (such as water and sewerage), street lighting, public safety, traffic, and the maintenance of public parks, gardens and cemeteries. They may also assist the state and federal governments in education, emergency fire and medical services, environmental protection and maintenance of monuments and historical landmarks. Since 1984, they have had the power to collect property taxes and user fees, although more funds are obtained from the state and federal governments than from their own income.

The largest municipality by population is Reynosa, with 704,767 residents (19.97% of the state population), while the smallest is San Nicolás with 926 residents. The largest municipality by land area is San Fernando which spans 6,918.80 km^{2} (2,671.36 sq mi), and the smallest is Ciudad Madero with 48.40 km^{2} (18.69 sq mi). The newest municipality is Río Bravo, established in 1961.

== Municipalities ==
Largest municipalities in Tamaulipas by population

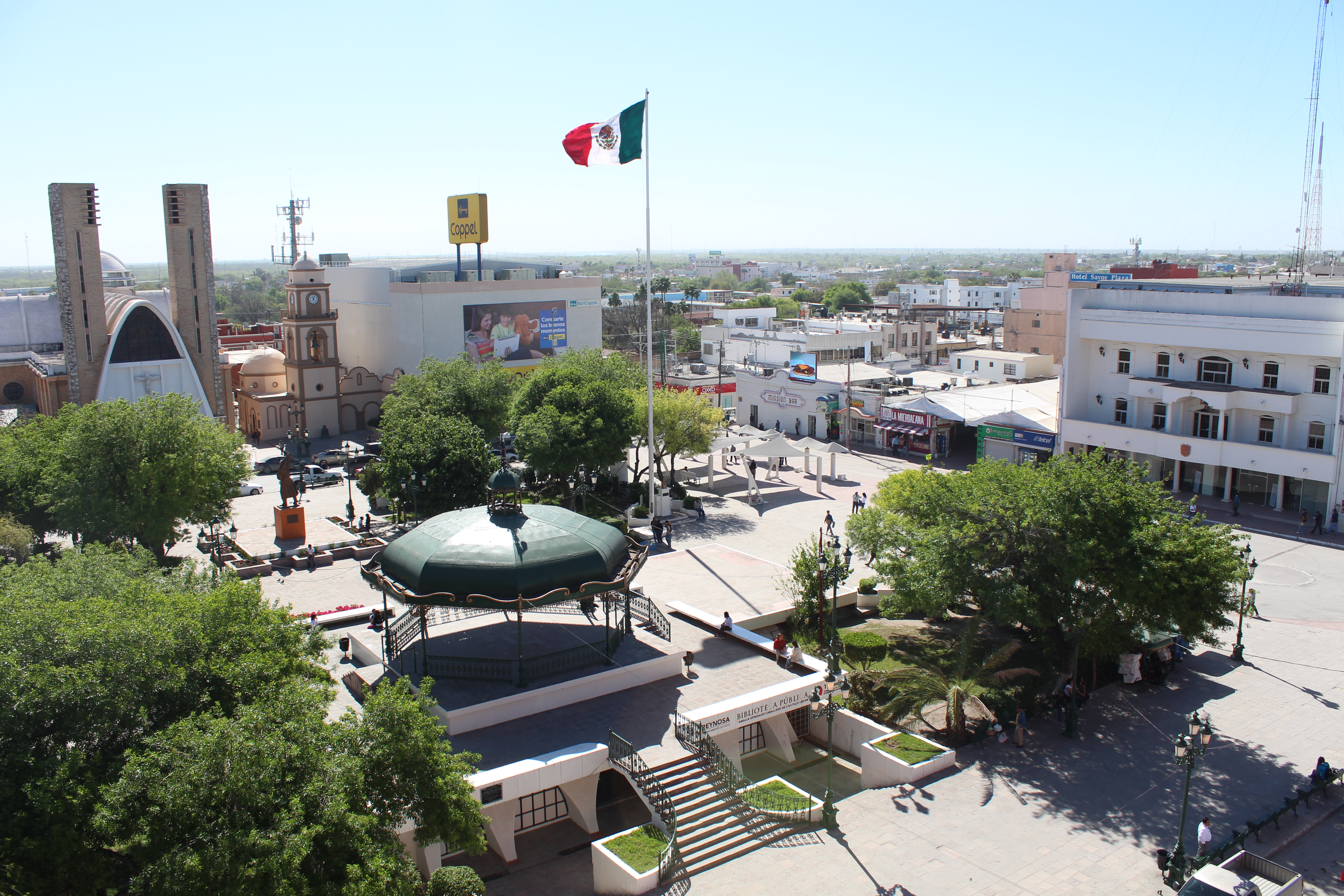
Reynosa, largest municipality by population in Tamaulipas

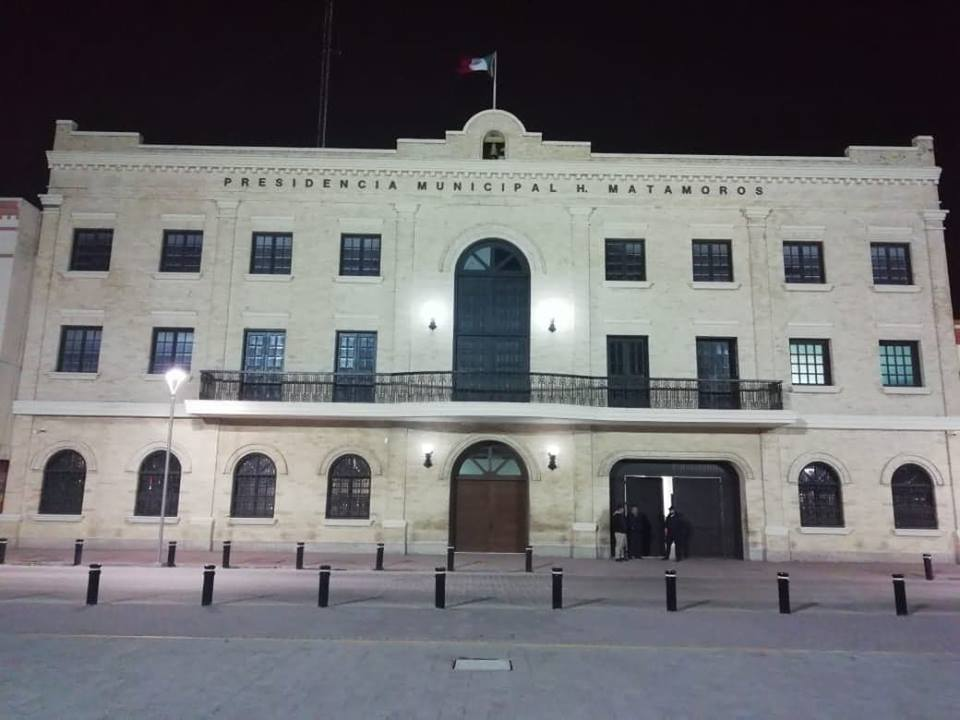
Matamoros, second largest municipality by population

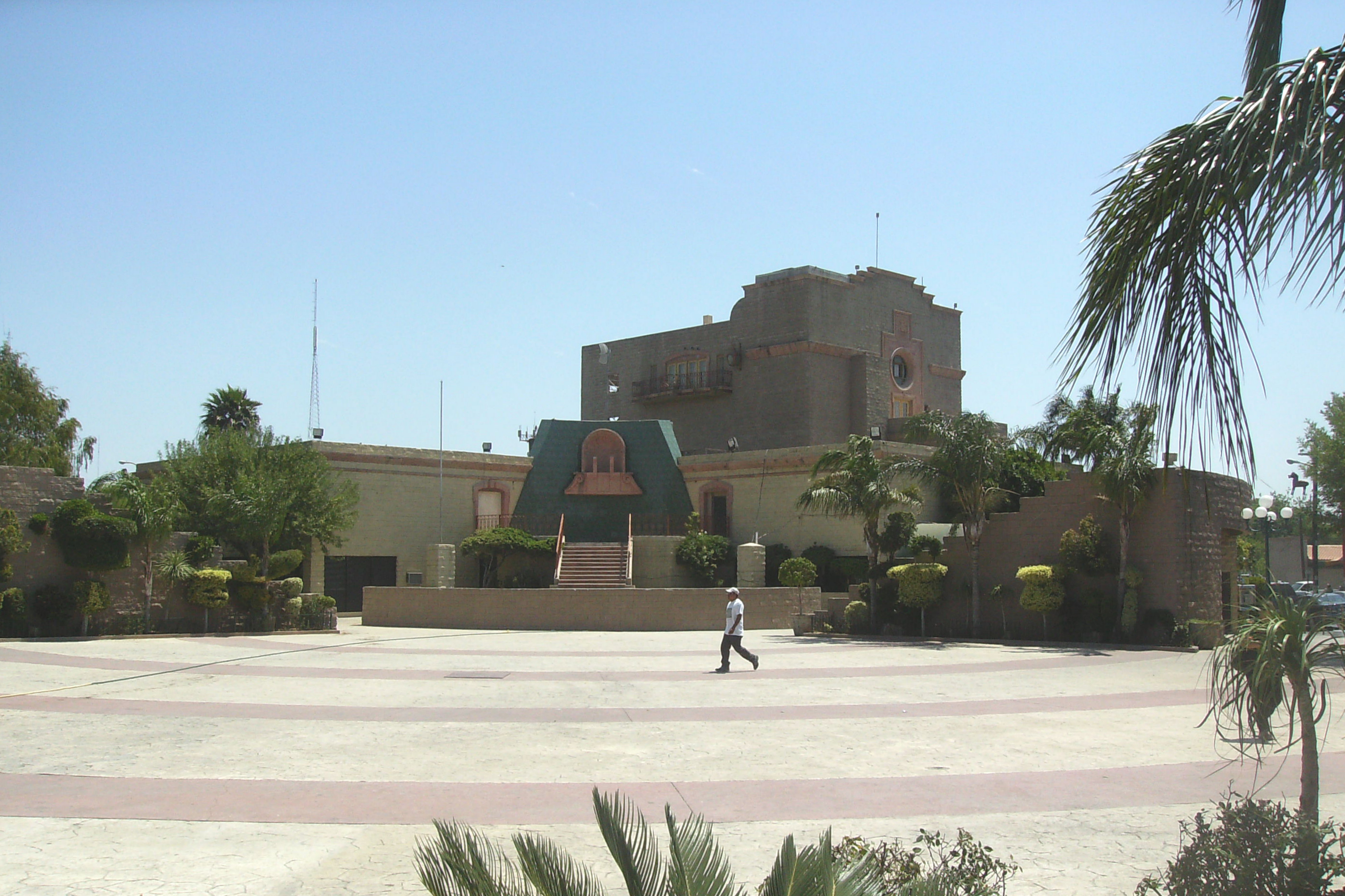
Nuevo Laredo is the third largest municipality by population.

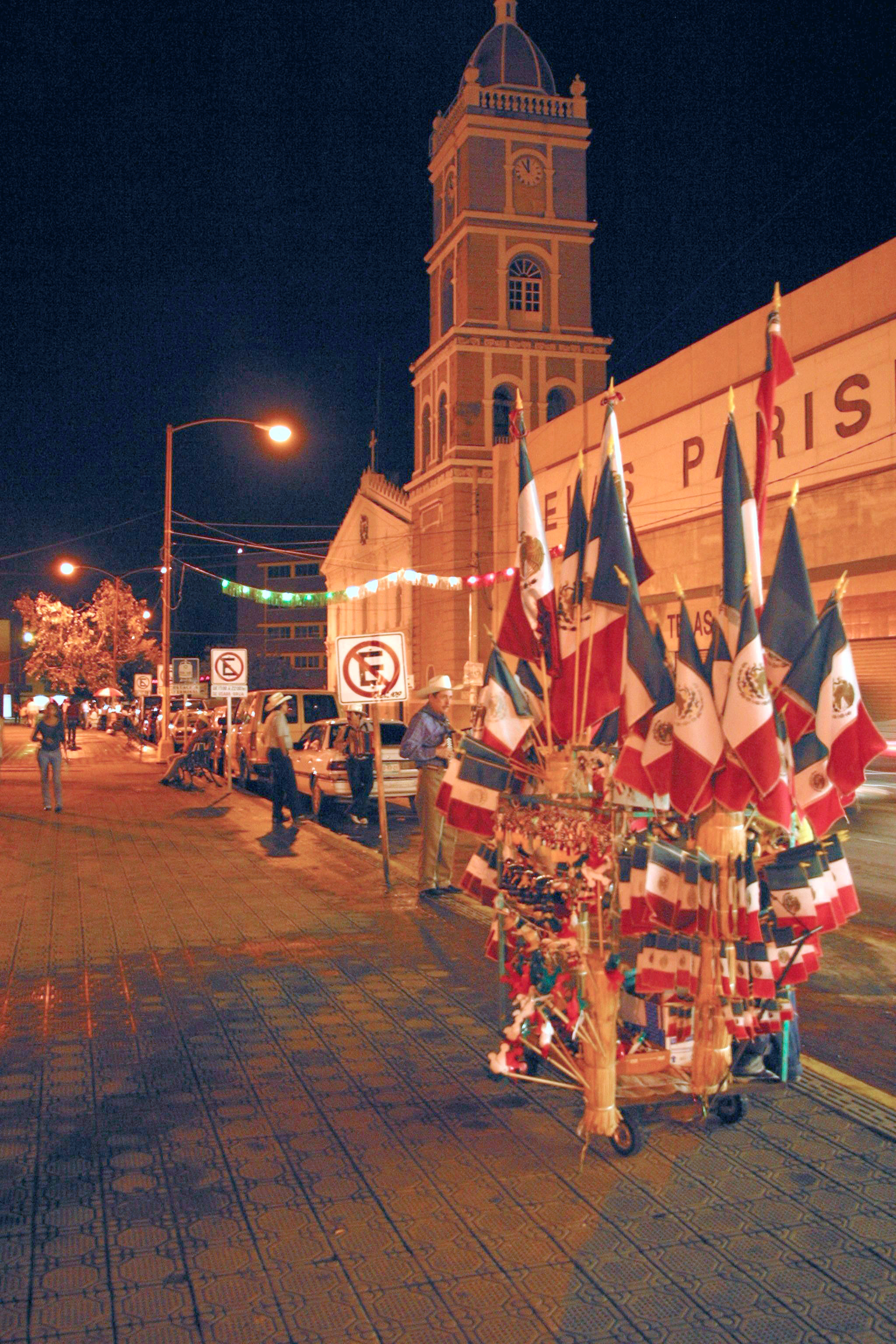
The fourth largest municipality by population is the state capital, Victoria.

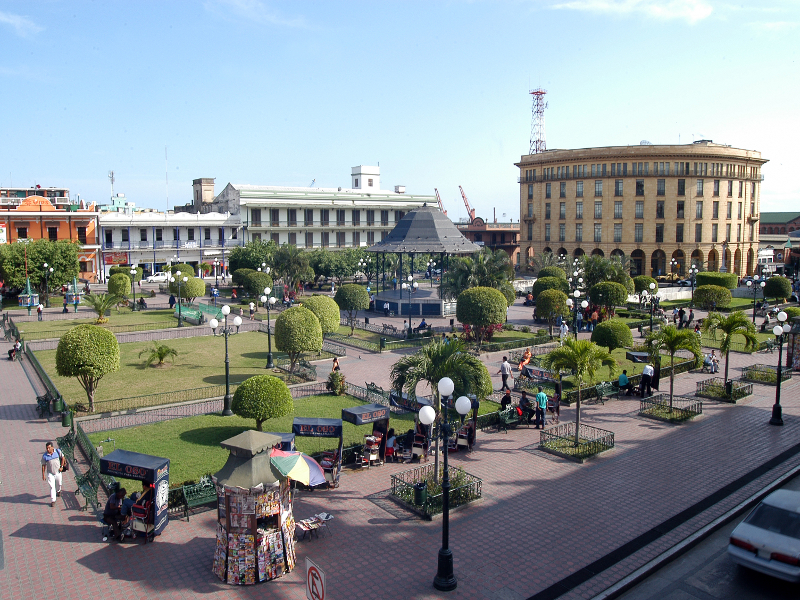
Tampico, fifth largest municipality by population

† State capital

Municipalities of Tamaulipas
Name	Municipal seat	Population (2020)	Population (2010)	Change	Land area		Population density (2020)	Incorporation date (Note: If there is no primary source for the incorporation date, the oldest date on which the municipality is referred to is used.)
Name	Municipal seat	Population (2020)	Population (2010)	Change	km^{2}	sq mi	Population density (2020)	Incorporation date
Abasolo (Note: Abasolo was originally incorporated as Santillana, changing its name to Abasolia on October 27, 1828 and to the current one on June 2, 1894.)	Abasolo	9,822	12,070	−18.6%	1,858.9	717.7	5.3/km^{2} (13.7/sq mi)	October 8, 1823
Aldama (Note: Aldama was originally incorporated as Presas, changing its name on November 25, 1828.)	Aldama	28,725	29,470	−2.5%	3,819.4	1,474.7	7.5/km^{2} (19.5/sq mi)	October 8, 1823
Altamira	Altamira	269,790	212,001	+27.3%	1,661.9	641.7	162.3/km^{2} (420.5/sq mi)	October 8, 1823
Antiguo Morelos (Note: Antiguo Morelos was originally incorporated as Baltazar, changing its name to Morelos on November 27, 1828 and to the current one on October 30, 1918.)	Antiguo Morelos	8,850	9,003	−1.7%	582.2	224.8	15.2/km^{2} (39.4/sq mi)	October 8, 1823
Burgos	Burgos	4,256	4,589	−7.3%	1,905.0	735.5	2.2/km^{2} (5.8/sq mi)	October 8, 1823
Bustamante (Note: Bustamante was originally incorporated as Real de Infantes, changing its name to Mineral de Bustamante on November 27, 1828 and to the current one on October 30, 1918.)	Bustamante	7,542	7,636	−1.2%	1,450.1	559.9	5.2/km^{2} (13.5/sq mi)	October 8, 1823
Camargo	Ciudad Camargo	16,546	14,933	+10.8%	930.4	359.2	17.8/km^{2} (46.1/sq mi)	May 25, 1825
Casas (Note: Casas was originally incorporated as Croix, changing its name on October 31, 1827.)	Casas	4,143	4,423	−6.3%	3,014.0	1,163.7	1.4/km^{2} (3.6/sq mi)	October 8, 1823
Ciudad Madero (Note: Ciudad Madero was originally incorporated as Villa de Cecilia, changing its name on December 13, 1930.)	Ciudad Madero	205,933	197,216	+4.4%	48.4	18.7	4,254.8/km^{2} (11,019.9/sq mi)	May 1, 1924
Cruillas	Cruillas	1,671	2,011	−16.9%	1,889.4	729.5	0.9/km^{2} (2.3/sq mi)	May 25, 1825
Gómez Farías	Gómez Farías	8,288	8,786	−5.7%	730.3	282.0	11.3/km^{2} (29.4/sq mi)	September 28, 1870
González (Note: González was originally incorporated as Horcasitas, changing its name to Magiscatzin on November 27, 1828 and to the current one on October 8, 1927.)	González	41,470	43,435	−4.5%	3,242.6	1,252.0	12.8/km^{2} (33.1/sq mi)	October 8, 1823
Güémez	Güémez	15,032	15,659	−4.0%	1,209.3	466.9	12.4/km^{2} (32.2/sq mi)	October 8, 1823
Guerrero (Note: Guerrero was originally incorporated as Revilla, changing its name on November 12, 1827.)	Nueva Ciudad Guerrero	3,803	4,477	−15.1%	2,441.6	942.7	1.6/km^{2} (4.0/sq mi)	October 8, 1823
Gustavo Díaz Ordaz (Note: Gustavo Díaz Ordaz was originally incorporated as San Miguel de Camargo, changing its name on April 24, 1968.)	Gustavo Díaz Ordaz	15,677	15,775	−0.6%	432.5	167.0	36.2/km^{2} (93.9/sq mi)	September 8, 1951
Hidalgo (Note: Hidalgo was originally incorporated as Hoyos, changing its name on July 21, 1838.)	Villa de Hidalgo	17,012	23,793	−28.5%	2,136.1	824.8	8.0/km^{2} (20.6/sq mi)	October 8, 1823
Juamave	Juamave	15,994	15,105	+5.9%	2,663.4	1,028.3	6.0/km^{2} (15.6/sq mi)	October 8, 1823
Jiménez (Note: Jiménez was originally incorporated as Santander, changing its name on July 21, 1838.)	Santander Jiménez	6,375	8,338	−23.5%	1,669.6	644.6	3.8/km^{2} (9.9/sq mi)	October 8, 1823
Llera	Llera	14,645	17,333	−15.5%	2,568.6	991.7	5.7/km^{2} (14.8/sq mi)	October 8, 1823
Mainero	Villa Mainero	2,048	2,579	−20.6%	364.2	140.6	5.6/km^{2} (14.6/sq mi)	July 2, 1924
El Mante (Note: El Mante was originally incorporated as Villa de Quintero, changing its name to Juárez on April 23, 1921 and to the current one on May 16, 1942.)	Ciudad Mante	106,144	115,792	−8.3%	1,637.2	632.1	64.8/km^{2} (167.9/sq mi)	May 24, 1876
Matamoros (Note: Matamoros was originally incorporated as Refugio, changing its name on May 14, 1834.)	Matamoros	541,979	489,193	+10.8%	4,633.3	1,788.9	117.0/km^{2} (303.0/sq mi)	October 8, 1823
Méndez (Note: Méndez was originally incorporated as Villa de Las Lajas, changing its name on June 23, 1880.)	Méndez	4,280	4,530	−5.5%	2,533.1	978.0	1.7/km^{2} (4.4/sq mi)	July 1, 1866
Mier	Ciudad Mier	6,385	4,762	+34.1%	922.9	356.3	6.9/km^{2} (17.9/sq mi)	October 8, 1823
Miguel Alemán	Ciudad Miguel Alemán	26,237	27,015	−2.9%	638.9	246.7	41.1/km^{2} (106.4/sq mi)	October 11, 1950
Miquihuana	Miquihuana	3,704	3,514	+5.4%	885.3	341.8	4.2/km^{2} (10.8/sq mi)	December 13, 1880
Nuevo Laredo (Note: Nuevo Laredo was originally incorporated as Laredo, changing its name on May 24, 1876.)	Nuevo Laredo	425,058	384,033	+10.7%	1,224.0	472.6	347.3/km^{2} (899.4/sq mi)	October 8, 1823
Nuevo Morelos	Nuevo Morelos	3,810	3,381	+12.7%	303.0	117.0	12.6/km^{2} (32.6/sq mi)	September 28, 1881
Ocampo (Note: Ocampo was originally incorporated as Santa Bárbara, changing its name on May 16, 1898.)	Ocampo	13,190	12,962	+1.8%	1,477.1	570.3	8.9/km^{2} (23.1/sq mi)	October 8, 1823
Padilla	Nuevo Padilla	13,618	14,020	−2.9%	1,358.9	524.7	10.0/km^{2} (26.0/sq mi)	October 8, 1823
Palmillas	Villa de Palmillas	1,917	1,795	+6.8%	480.0	185.3	4.0/km^{2} (10.3/sq mi)	October 8, 1823
Reynosa	Reynosa	704,767	608,891	+15.7%	3,146.9	1,215.0	224.0/km^{2} (580.0/sq mi)	October 8, 1823
Río Bravo	Río Bravo	132,484	118,259	+12.0%	1,583.7	611.5	83.7/km^{2} (216.7/sq mi)	December 27, 1961
San Carlos	San Carlos	7,411	9,331	−20.6%	2,915.1	1,125.5	2.5/km^{2} (6.6/sq mi)	October 8, 1823
San Fernando	San Fernando	51,405	57,220	−10.2%	6,918.8	2,671.4	7.4/km^{2} (19.2/sq mi)	October 8, 1823
San Nicolás	San Nicolás	926	1,031	−10.2%	544.7	210.3	1.7/km^{2} (4.4/sq mi)	October 8, 1823
Soto la Marina	Villa Soto la Marina	23,673	24,764	−4.4%	6,715.5	2,592.9	3.5/km^{2} (9.1/sq mi)	October 8, 1823
Tampico	Tampico	297,562	297,554	0.0%	114.5	44.2	2,598.8/km^{2} (6,730.8/sq mi)	April 12, 1823
Tula	Tula	28,230	27,572	+2.4%	3,076.0	1,187.7	9.2/km^{2} (23.8/sq mi)	October 8, 1823
Valle Hermoso	Valle Hermoso	60,055	63,170	−4.9%	899.8	347.4	66.7/km^{2} (172.9/sq mi)	September 8, 1851
Victoria (Note: Victoria was originally incorporated as Aguayo, changing its name on April 20, 1825.)	Ciudad Victoria†	349,688	321,953	+8.6%	1,463.6	565.1	238.9/km^{2} (618.8/sq mi)	October 8, 1823
Villagrán (Note: Villagrán was originally incorporated as Cerro de Santiago, changing its name to Mineral de Santa María de Villagrán on November 15, 1827 and to the current one on October 30, 1918.)	Villagrán	5,361	6,316	−15.1%	1,288.2	497.4	4.2/km^{2} (10.8/sq mi)	October 8, 1823
Xicoténcatl (Note: Xicoténcatl was originally incorporated as Escandón, changing its name on October 27, 1828.)	Xicoténcatl	22,229	22,864	−2.8%	870.7	336.2	25.5/km^{2} (66.1/sq mi)	October 8, 1823
Tamaulipas	—	3,527,735	3,268,554	+7.9%	80,249.3	30,984.4	15.4/km^{2} (39.9/sq mi)	—
Mexico	—	126,014,024	112,336,538	+12.2%	1,960,646.7	757,010	64.3/km^{2} (166.5/sq mi)	—
