= Aldama =

Aldama may refer to:

- Aldama (surname)
- Aldama (plant), a genus of plants of the family Asteraceae

== Places ==
- Aldama Municipality, Chiapas
  - Aldama, Chiapas, central town in the municipality
- Aldama Municipality, Chihuahua
  - Juan Aldama, Chihuahua, central town in the municipality
- Aldama, Guanajuato
- Aldama Municipality, Tamaulipas
  - Aldama, Tamaulipas, central town in the municipality

== See also ==
- Los Aldamas, Nuevo León
- León de los Aldama, formal name of León, Guanajuato
