= Miramar, Tamaulipas =

Miramar
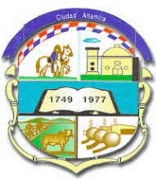
- Coat of arms
- Interactive map of Miramar
- Location in Mexico Miramar (Mexico)
- Coordinates: 22°20′15″N 97°52′10″W
- Country: Mexico
- State: Tamaulipas
- Municipality: Altamira
- Settled: May 2, 1749

Government
  - Presidente Municipal: Pedro Carrillo Estrada (PRI)

Population (2010 census)
  - City: 118,614
  - Metro: 859,419
- Time zone: UTC-6 (CST)
- Codigo Postal: 89600
- Area code: 833
- Website: Municipio de Altamira

Miramar is a city near the southeastern tip of the state of Tamaulipas in Mexico. It is the largest city in the municipality of Altamira and third largest of the Tampico Metropolitan Area. It has 161,820 inhabitants according to the official 2020 INEGI count, making it the largest locality in the municipality. It is the seventh-largest community in the state, having passed Río Bravo since the previous census.

== Geography ==
The city of Miramar is located in the south of the state of Tamaulipas, within the municipality of Altamira. Its coordinates are 22°21′03″N 97°52′57″W, and it has an average elevation of 11 meters above sea level. It is entirely conurbated with the cities of Tampico and Ciudad Madero to the south and with the city of Altamira to the north. On its outskirts, to the west is the Miralta Lagoon, and to the east are the Miramar Lagoon and the "El Gringo" Lagoon.

== Climate ==
Miramar, like the entire municipality of Altamira, has a tropical subhumid climate. It has an average annual temperature of 24.5 °C and an average precipitation of 976.3 millimeters.

== Demographics ==
According to the 2020 census, Miramar has 161,810 inhabitants, with 79,789 men and 82,031 women. It covers an area of 33.0 km² and has a population density of 4,907 people per square kilometer.

The city is the 7th most populous city in Tamaulipas and the 91st most populous city in Mexico. The city has experienced one of the largest demographic growths in the state of Tamaulipas due to its physical conurbation with the city of Tampico. As Tampico lacks additional municipal space, it has extended its limits and influence over the city of Miramar, which, being located in the vast territory of the municipality of Altamira, receives all the new population arriving in the Tampico Metropolitan Area. This has resulted in Miramar growing from a rural population of fewer than 2,000 inhabitants in the 1980s to one of the main urban centers in the state, with a population nearing 200,000 inhabitants. It is expected that in the coming decades, it will become the most populous city in the Tampico Metropolitan Area. Miramar has a fertility rate of 1.84 children per woman; the average level of schooling is 10.12 years; and 3.94 percent of the population is indigenous.

== See also ==
- List of cities in Mexico
