= Ciudad Victoria International Airport =

International airport serving Ciudad Victoria, Tamaulipas, Mexico

Ciudad Victoria International Airport Aeropuerto Internacional de Ciudad Victoria
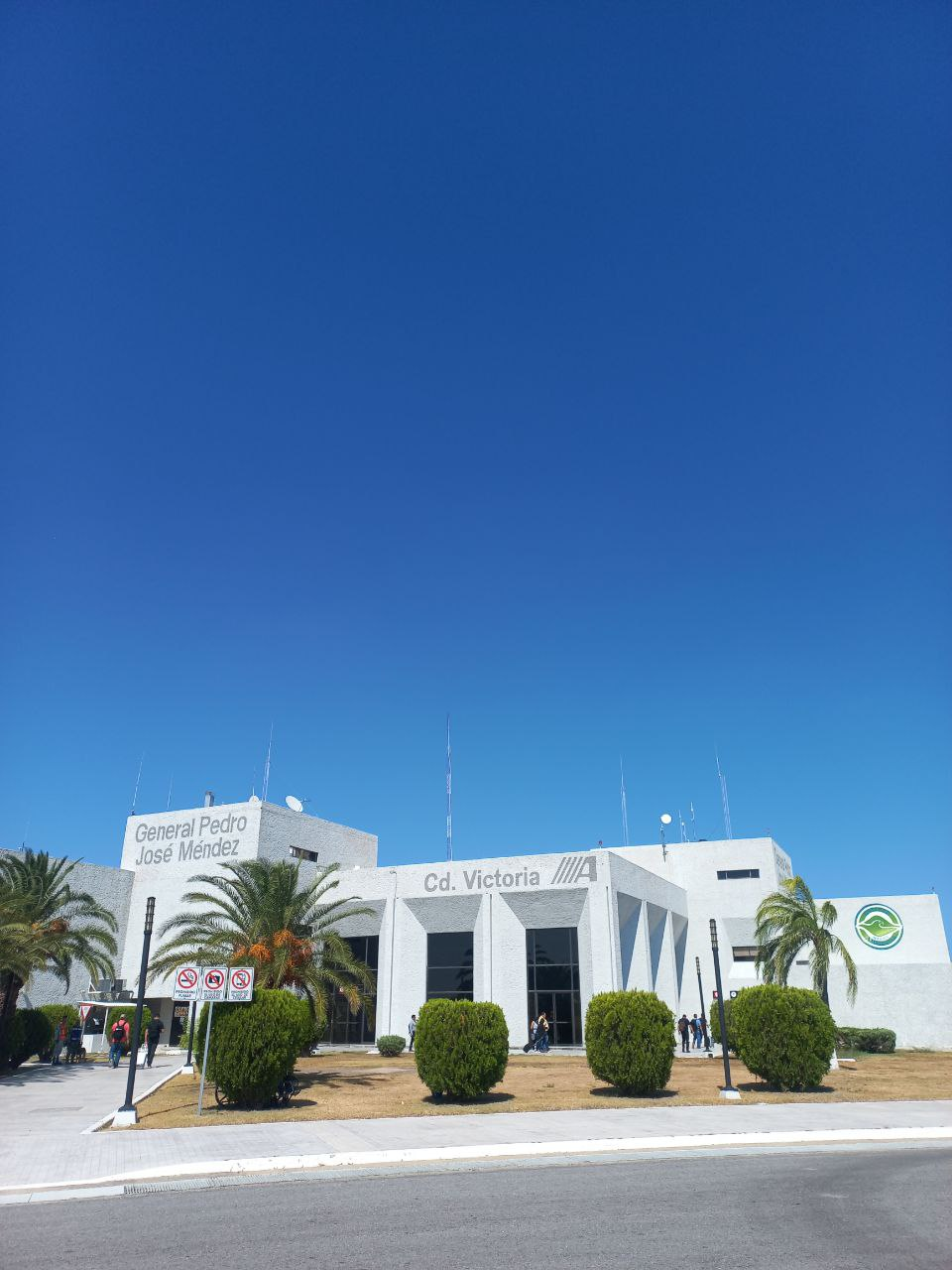
- IATA: CVM; ICAO: MMCV

Summary
- Airport type: Public
- Operator: Grupo Olmeca-Maya-Mexica
- Serves: Ciudad Victoria, Tamaulipas, Mexico
- Location: Güémez, Tamaulipas, Mexico
- Time zone: CST (UTC−06:00)
- Elevation AMSL: 232 m (761 ft)
- Coordinates: 23°42′14″N 098°57′23″W
- Website: www.grupomundomaya.com/CVM

Map
- Location of the airport in Tamaulipas CVM (Mexico)

Runways
Direction	Length		Surface
Direction	m	ft	Surface
15/33	2,200	7,218	Asphalt

Statistics (2025)
- Total passengers: 15,163
- Ranking in Mexico: 58th ▼3
- Source: Agencia Federal de Aviación Civil

Ciudad Victoria International Airport (Spanish: Aeropuerto Internacional de Ciudad Victoria); officially Aeropuerto Internacional General Pedro José Méndez (General Pedro José Méndez International Airport) (IATA: CVM, ICAO: MMCV) is an international airport located in Güémez, Tamaulipas, Mexico. It handles air traffic of the city of Ciudad Victoria, serving domestic flights and supporting cargo operations and various executive and general aviation activities. Operated by Grupo Olmeca-Maya-Mexica (GAFSACOMM), a holding company owned by the Mexican military, the airport was named after Pedro José Méndez, a distinguished military figure from Tamaulipas. In 2025, the airport handled 15,163 passengers.

== Facilities ==
The airport is situated at an elevation of 232 metres (761 ft) above mean sea level, covering an area of 388 hectares (960 acres). It features a single asphalt runway, designated as 15/33, measuring 2,200 metres (7,200 ft). The commercial aviation apron spans 16,200 square metres (174,000 sq ft), featuring three parking positions for narrow-body aircraft and additional stands for general aviation. Official operating hours are from 7:00 to 19:00.

The passenger terminal caters to both domestic arrivals and departures in a single-story structure. It includes check-in areas, a security checkpoint, a baggage claim area, and an arrivals hall with car rental services, taxi stands, and several retail stores. The departures concourse includes two gates with direct access to the apron, allowing passengers to board their planes by walking to the aircraft. Adjacent facilities include a dedicated general aviation terminal with parking areas, hangars, administration offices, and courier and logistic facilities.

== Airlines and destinations ==
=== Passenger ===
Airlines	Destinations
Aerus	Mexico City–Felipe Ángeles

=== Destinations map ===
Domestic destinations from Ciudad Victoria International Airport
Red = Year-round destination
Blue = Future destination
Green = Seasonal destination

== Statistics ==
=== Annual Traffic ===
Passenger statistics at Ciudad Victoria Airport
Year	Total Passengers	change %	Cargo movements (t)	Air operations
2006	43,949	Steady	144	8,211
2007	65,660	▲49.40%	169	9,131
2008	65,058	▼0.92%	182	9,364
2009	65,670	▲0.94%	157	9,915
2010	65,447	▼0.34%	205	13,341
2011	88,686	▲35.51%	209	14,749
2012	86,072	▼2.95%	299	13,659
2013	79,765	▼7.33%	295	11,868
2014	86,928	▲8.98%	258	11,206
2015	75,156	▼13.54%	277	9,740
2016	82,248	▲9.44%	272	9,365
2017	63,144	▼23.23%	217	7,492
2018	59,696	▼5.5%	173	6,931
2019	50,557	▼15.31%	96	6,081
2020	15,088	▼70.16%	31	4,113
2021	15,163	▲0.50%	34	4,343
2022	15,164	▲0.01%	30	3,742
2023	29,327	▲93.4%	0	3,557
2024	18,799	▼35.9%	5	3,094
2025	15,163	▼19.34%	0	2,822

== See also ==
- List of the busiest airports in Mexico
- List of airports in Mexico
- List of airports by ICAO code: M
- List of busiest airports in North America
- List of the busiest airports in Latin America
- Transportation in Mexico
- Tourism in Mexico
