= Disappearance of Carlos Ornelas Puga =

2013 disappearance of Catholic Priest

Carlos Ornelas Puga
- Church: Los Cinco Señores
- Archdiocese: Roman Catholic Archdiocese of Monterrey
- Diocese: Roman Catholic Diocese of Ciudad Victoria

Orders
- Ordination: 2001
- Rank: Priest

Personal details
- Born: Carlos Ornelas Puga; 25 October 1975 Ciudad Victoria, Tamaulipas, Mexico
- Denomination: Roman Catholic
- Disappeared: 3 November 2013 (aged 38); Jiménez, Tamaulipas
- Status: Missing for 12 years, 11 months and 2 days

On 3 November 2013, Catholic priest Carlos Ornelas Puga was kidnapped by gunmen in the Mexican state of Tamaulipas. His whereabouts remain unknown and the motives behind his kidnapping are unclear, but the Mexican authorities allege that the priest was kidnapped by an organized crime group.

== Biography ==
Carlos Ornelas Puga was born on 25 October 1975 in Ciudad Victoria, Tamaulipas, Mexico. He was ordained in the Catholic Church in 2001, and held a post as head of the Deanery in Jiménez, Tamaulipas. As a member of the Roman Catholic Diocese of Ciudad Victoria, Ornelas Puga was also a priest at Los Cinco Señores parish church in Jiménez. Prior to his kidnapping in November 2013, he aided victims of the Mexican drug war in Tamaulipas, provided seminars for teenagers, and helped conduct the missions program of the diocese.

== Kidnapping ==
After conducting an evening mass at Los Cinco Señores parish on 3 November 2013 in Jiménez, Tamaulipas, Ornelas Puga was reportedly kidnapped by gunmen presumably involved in organized crime. (Note: Another source states that gunmen stormed the parish hall when he was conducting mass and took him by force.) Witnesses notified local authorities of the abduction the moment the crime occurred. However, no measures were taken for more than four days, according to Roman Catholic Diocese of Ciudad Victoria spokesman Fernando Sandoval. On 7 November, the Tamaulipas authorities sent a convoy of state police officers and an anti-kidnapping team to investigate the case, but they were ambushed by gunmen in Padilla, Tamaulipas. The attack left three officers (two male and one female) wounded by gunfire.

Two days later, the Mexican authorities confirmed that several mutilated bodies were located at a ranch known as La Borbolla along the highway that connects Jiménez and Padilla. Unconfirmed reports suggested that the body of Ornelas Puga might be among the remains. On 13 November, the Mexican Episcopal Conference (CEM) confirmed the disappearance of Ornelas Puga and condemned the crime. The CEM admitted that this was not the first case a priest had been targeted in Mexico; many others have received threats from organized crime for protecting migrants and working on cases of people who have disappeared across the country.

=== Background ===
Ornelas Puga was kidnapped in Tamaulipas, one of the most violent states in Mexico. Given its geographical location along the U.S.-Mexico border, Tamaulipas is a major route for human trafficking, arms smuggling, and international drug trade. It is also home to two transnational criminal organizations, the Gulf Cartel and Los Zetas, who have fought for the control of these smuggling routes along the Texan border area since early 2010. In the months leading to his abduction, the municipality of Jiménez experienced a series of violent episodes that were a direct result of turf wars between rival drug trafficking organizations. Kidnappings—including forced disappearances of entire families—were reported in the region in earlier months. In November 2013, the month Ornelas Puga was kidnapped, nine people were reportedly abducted in Jiménez; their whereabouts remain unknown. According to a 2013 report from the Vatican, Mexico was the second-most-violent country for priests in Latin America (just behind Colombia). In the administration of President Felipe Calderón, 17 priests were killed between 2007 and 2012. The organization responsible for counting the killings is the Catholic Multimedia Center (Spanish: Centro Católico Multimedial), which is part of the religious congregation Society of Saint Peter (Spanish: Sociedad de San Pablo), who directly gives the list to Rome through Agenzia Fides.

Clergymen in Mexico are not immune to the drug violence nor to attacks from organized crime. Priests have been forced to pay protection to organized crime; if any given priest refuses to pay the racketeering, the threats become more severe, like burning the church's precinct, a kidnapping, or even death. When it is an extortion, the payment usually is around 10,000 pesos (about 778 USD). For a kidnapping, the ransom averages at around 2 million pesos (153,530 USD). Priests' outspokenness against Mexico's drug trafficking organizations can also incur reprisals, especially in areas where drug-related crimes are high. Others have received death threats and attacks because they have protected migrants (common prey of organized crime) from abuse. Besides Ornelas Puga, two other priests in Ciudad Victoria, Tamaulipas were kidnapped in December 2013 and remain disappeared. Guillermo Amaro César (also from Tamaulipas) was killed in 2013 after alleged organized crime members beat him to death. The state authorities concluded that the motive of the murder was stemmed by robbery.

=== Reaction ===
In September 2014, the local bishop Antonio González Sánchez called for a peaceful march in memory of Ornelas Puga and other people who remain disappeared. The march was scheduled for 3 November 2014, the anniversary date of the priest's disappearance. Every year, the Roman Catholic Diocese of Ciudad Victoria organizes a march in the city with family members and friends of people who have disappeared in Mexico.

== See also ==
- List of kidnappings
- List of people who disappeared mysteriously (2000–present)
- List of unsolved murders (2000–present)
