= Aldama Municipality, Tamaulipas =

Municipality in Tamaulipas State, Mexico

Coordinates: 22.917°N 98.067°W

Aldama
- Municipality
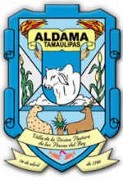
- Coat of arms

- Location in Mexico Aldama (Mexico)
- Country: Mexico
- State: Tamaulipas
- Demonym: (in Spanish)
- Time zone: UTC−6 (CST)

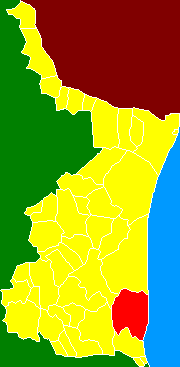
Show de Municipality in the State

Aldama is a municipality of the northeastern Mexican state of Tamaulipas. According to the census of 2010, the municipality had an area of 3,672 square kilometres (1,418 sq mi) and a population of 29,470, including the town of Aldama with a population of 13,661.

== History ==
The region of Aldama prior to the arrival of the Spaniards in the early 16th century was the northern outpost of the Huastec culture, a maize growing culture remotely related to the Maya. The first European to traverse the region was Francisco de Garay in 1523. Maize cultivation reached approximately to the Tropic of Cancer beyond which lived the hunter-gathering Coahuiltecan people.

Spanish settlement of Aldama began in 1785 when arrival of 76 families comprising 293 persons from the Mexican state later known as Guerrero. A Catholic mission called San Vicente del Platanal was established to convert the local Indian people, wean them away from their semi-nomadic livestyle, and concentrate them into settlements. Aldama was founded on April 15, 1790, under the name of Villa de la Divina Pastora de las Presas del Rey. In 1828, the municipality was renamed Aldama in honor of Ignacio Aldama, a hero of the Mexican War of Independence.

== Geography ==
Aldama is bordered by the municipalities of Soto La Marina to the north, Altamira to the south, Casas and González to the west, and the Gulf of Mexico to the east. The northwestern corner of Aldama is at the southern extremity of the mountain range known as the Sierra de Tamaulipas.

The primary natural vegetation found in Aldama is tropical thorn forest (Tamaulipan matorral). At higher elevations with higher rainfall and lower temperatures, are three major vegetation types. Tropical deciduous forest is found at elevations of 300 to 700 metres (1,000 to 2,300 ft). The average height of this closed-canopy forest is about 7.5 metres (25 ft). Montane scrub is found in dry areas between 600 and 900 metres (2,000 and 3,000 ft) elevation. This vegetation type consists of low thickets and savanna. Huisache is a common shrub. Pine-oak forests are found in a small area at an elevation greater than 800 metres (2,600 ft).

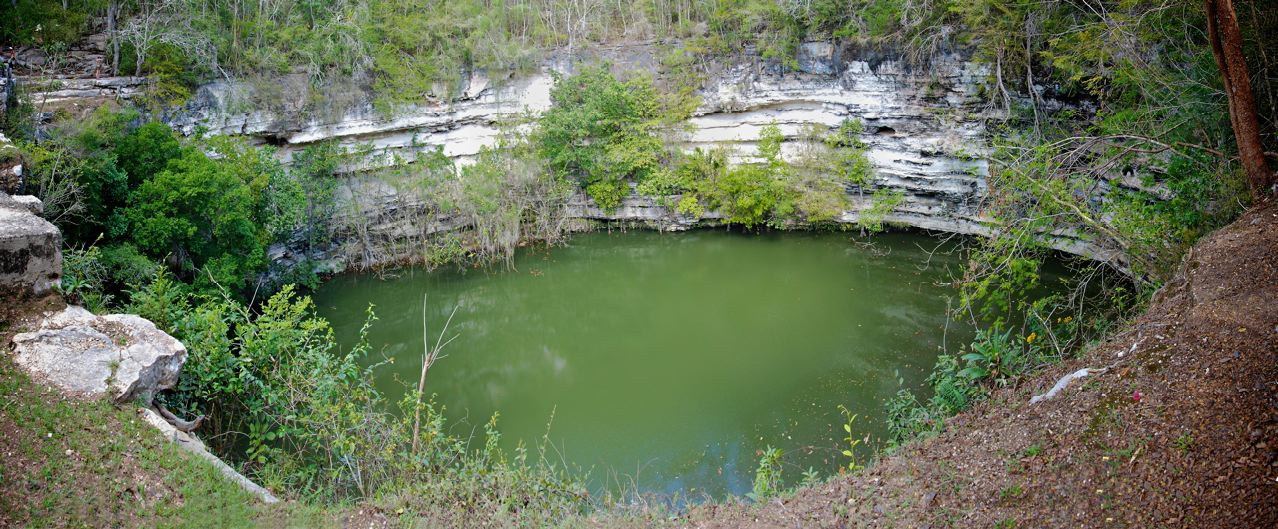
A cenote similar to those found in the Sierra de Tamaulipas

Near the town of Aldama is a limestone karst area in which many caves and cenotes (water-filled sinkholes) are found, including Zacatón which is the deepest sinkhole in the world with a depth of 339 metres (1,112 ft). In 1994, cave-diving pioneer Sheck Exley died attempting to dive to the bottom of Zacatón.

=== Climate ===
Freezes are rare in Aldama with an all-time low temperature of −2 °C (28 °F)

Climate data for Aldama, Tamaulipas (1991–2020)
Month	Jan	Feb	Mar	Apr	May	Jun	Jul	Aug	Sep	Oct	Nov	Dec	Year
Record high °C (°F)	39.0 (102.2)	39.8 (103.6)	42.0 (107.6)	46.0 (114.8)	48.0 (118.4)	40.0 (104.0)	40.0 (104.0)	41.0 (105.8)	38.0 (100.4)	39.0 (102.2)	34.0 (93.2)	34.0 (93.2)	48.0 (118.4)
Mean daily maximum °C (°F)	25.0 (77.0)	26.8 (80.2)	29.0 (84.2)	31.5 (88.7)	33.3 (91.9)	33.9 (93.0)	33.3 (91.9)	33.5 (92.3)	32.0 (89.6)	30.2 (86.4)	27.2 (81.0)	24.5 (76.1)	30.0 (86.0)
Daily mean °C (°F)	18.2 (64.8)	19.5 (67.1)	21.8 (71.2)	24.2 (75.6)	26.5 (79.7)	27.4 (81.3)	27.1 (80.8)	27.1 (80.8)	25.9 (78.6)	23.5 (74.3)	20.6 (69.1)	18.1 (64.6)	23.3 (73.9)
Mean daily minimum °C (°F)	11.4 (52.5)	12.2 (54.0)	14.7 (58.5)	16.9 (62.4)	19.6 (67.3)	20.9 (69.6)	21.0 (69.8)	20.7 (69.3)	19.8 (67.6)	16.7 (62.1)	14.0 (57.2)	11.6 (52.9)	16.6 (61.9)
Record low °C (°F)	−0.5 (31.1)	−4.0 (24.8)	0.0 (32.0)	3.0 (37.4)	6.0 (42.8)	12.0 (53.6)	12.0 (53.6)	10.0 (50.0)	10.0 (50.0)	3.0 (37.4)	0.0 (32.0)	0.0 (32.0)	−4.0 (24.8)
Average precipitation mm (inches)	10.3 (0.41)	6.2 (0.24)	11.8 (0.46)	9.3 (0.37)	25.3 (1.00)	95.1 (3.74)	77.8 (3.06)	86.3 (3.40)	67.7 (2.67)	40.2 (1.58)	11.1 (0.44)	11.4 (0.45)	452.5 (17.81)
Average precipitation days (≥ 0.1 mm)	2.9	1.9	2.7	2.7	3.7	8.5	7.9	8.0	9.6	4.5	3.0	2.6	58.0
Source: Servicio Meteorologico Nacional

Aldama's climate borders on three different Koppen climatic classifications:: Tropical savanna (Aw), Steppe (BS), and Humid subtropical (Cwa). The higher elevations of the municipality are slightly cooler and wetter.

=== Hydrography ===
There are 3 important rivers in Aldama: the Tigre river, the Barbarena river and the Carrizal river.

== Economy ==
Cattle are by far the most important agricultural product of the municipality. The most valuable crops grown are chili peppers, onions, tomatoes, and soybeans. Fishing is important as a source of income and food. Among the products are oysters, huachinango (red snapper), snook, tarpon, shrimp, crab, tilapia, and sea trout.

== Tourism ==
The municipality has several natural attractions. There are pristine and undeveloped beaches among them: Barra del Tordo, Morón, and Rancho Nuevo. They are very popular among bass fishing aficionados and winter Texans. They are easily reached from Tampico, Monterrey, or Brownsville, TX. Cenotes attract sight-seers and cave divers.
