= San Nicolás Municipality =

San Nicolás Municipality may refer to:

- San Nicolás Municipality, Tamaulipas
- San Nicolás, Oaxaca
