= Altamira Municipality, Tamaulipas =

Coordinates: 22.396°N 97.937°W

Altamira
- Municipality
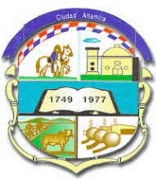
- Coat of arms

- Location in Mexico Altamira (Mexico)
- Country: Mexico
- State: Tamaulipas
- Demonym: (in Spanish)
- Time zone: UTC−6 (CST)

Localization of Altamira within Tamaulipas

Altamira is a municipality in the Mexican state of Tamaulipas. It is located immediately to the north of the municipalities of Tampico and Ciudad Madero, at the southern tip of the state of Tamaulipas, on the Gulf of Mexico. Additionally, it borders the municipalities of González on the west and Aldama on the north, as well as Pánuco in the state of Veracruz on the southeast. Altamira can also refer to the city, founded in 1749, that is its municipal seat and second-largest community. The municipality is primarily made up of the cities of Miramar and Altamira, in addition to many smaller outlying towns such as Cuauhtémoc. The municipality has a total area of 1,666.53 km^{2} (643.45 sq mi).

According to the INEGI 2010 census, the municipality has a population of 212,001 people. The city of Miramar had a population of 118,614 and the city of Altamira had a population of 59,536.

== Economy ==
The municipality is the industrial and port center for the region; although the Tampico docks on the Pánuco River are used for loose cargo, the Port of Altamira handles all the containerised cargos.

Altamira's advantage is having a sea Port with a great territorial reserve of approximately 9500 hectares. Altamira has land and rail connections to connect all companies with the main consumer markets and production hubs in Mexico, highlighting the northeastern zone, which includes the states of Tamaulipas, Nuevo León and Coahuila.

Because of its privileged geographical location, the Port of Altamira is easily accessible to the world's main shipping lines, enabling it to reach any market in every continent. The Port of Altamira was conceived under the Industrial Port Model; this means an industrial Park with its own Port. This situation results in multiple advantages for investors, since there is enough space and capacity to develop many industries which will have a nearby sea port available. Businesses can make their logistic processes more efficient, resulting in economic benefits.

A large industrial sector, mainly involved in petro-chemicals, provides much employment and tax revenue; it includes foreign companies such as Chemours, SABIC, BASF, POSCO, etc. The state is trying to encourage construction of a new oil refinery for further integration. In 2014 President Pena announced that Mexico was ending its monopoly and opening oil and gas exploration to private companies; he hopes to stimulate both large and small-scale projects.

== Education ==
- Tamaulipas Institute of Higher Education
