= Gustavo Díaz Ordaz, Tamaulipas =

Gustavo Díaz Ordaz
- Municipality
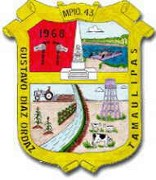
- Coat of arms

- Location in Mexico Gustavo Díaz Ordaz (Mexico)
- Coordinates: 26.2322222322°N 98.5969444544°W
- Country: Mexico
- State: Tamaulipas
- Municipal seat: Ciudad Gustavo Díaz Ordaz

Government
  - Mayor: Nataly García Díaz (MORENA)

Population (2020)
  - Total: 15,677

Gustavo Díaz Ordaz is a municipality located in the Mexican state of Tamaulipas.

== Towns and villages ==
The largest localities (cities, towns, and villages) are:

Name	2020 Census Population
Ciudad Gustavo Díaz Ordaz	12,067
Valadeces	1,895
Venecia	417
Lucio Blanco	408
Los Villarreales	179
Luis Echeverría	131
Ejido Valadeces	107
Buenavista	92
Total Municipality	15,677

== Adjacent municipalities and counties ==
- Reynosa Municipality - east and south
- General Bravo Municipality, Nuevo León - south
- Camargo Municipality - west and northwest
- Starr County, Texas - north
- Hidalgo County, Texas - northeast
