= Matamoros Municipality, Tamaulipas =

Coordinates: 25°52′N 97°30′W

Matamoros
- Municipality
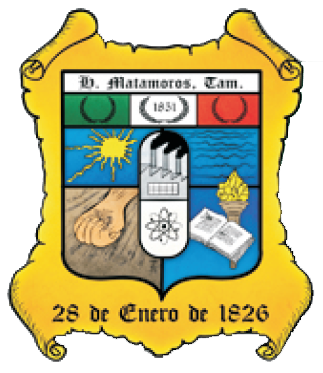
- Coat of arms

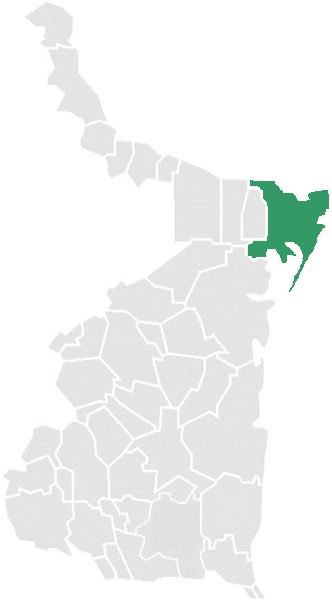
- Municipality of Matamoros in Tamaulipas
- Country: Mexico
- State: Tamaulipas
- Municipal seat: Matamoros

Population (2010)
  - Total: 489,193

Matamoros is a municipality located in the Mexican state of Tamaulipas. Its municipal seat is the city of Matamoros.

== Towns and villages ==
The largest localities (cities, towns, and villages) are:

Name	2010 Census Population
Matamoros	449,815
Ramírez	3,743
El Control	3,136
Las Higuerillas	2,129
CEFERESO Número 3	2,082
Santa Adelaida	1,754
Estación Sandoval	1,146
El Galaneño	1,057
Total Municipality	489,193

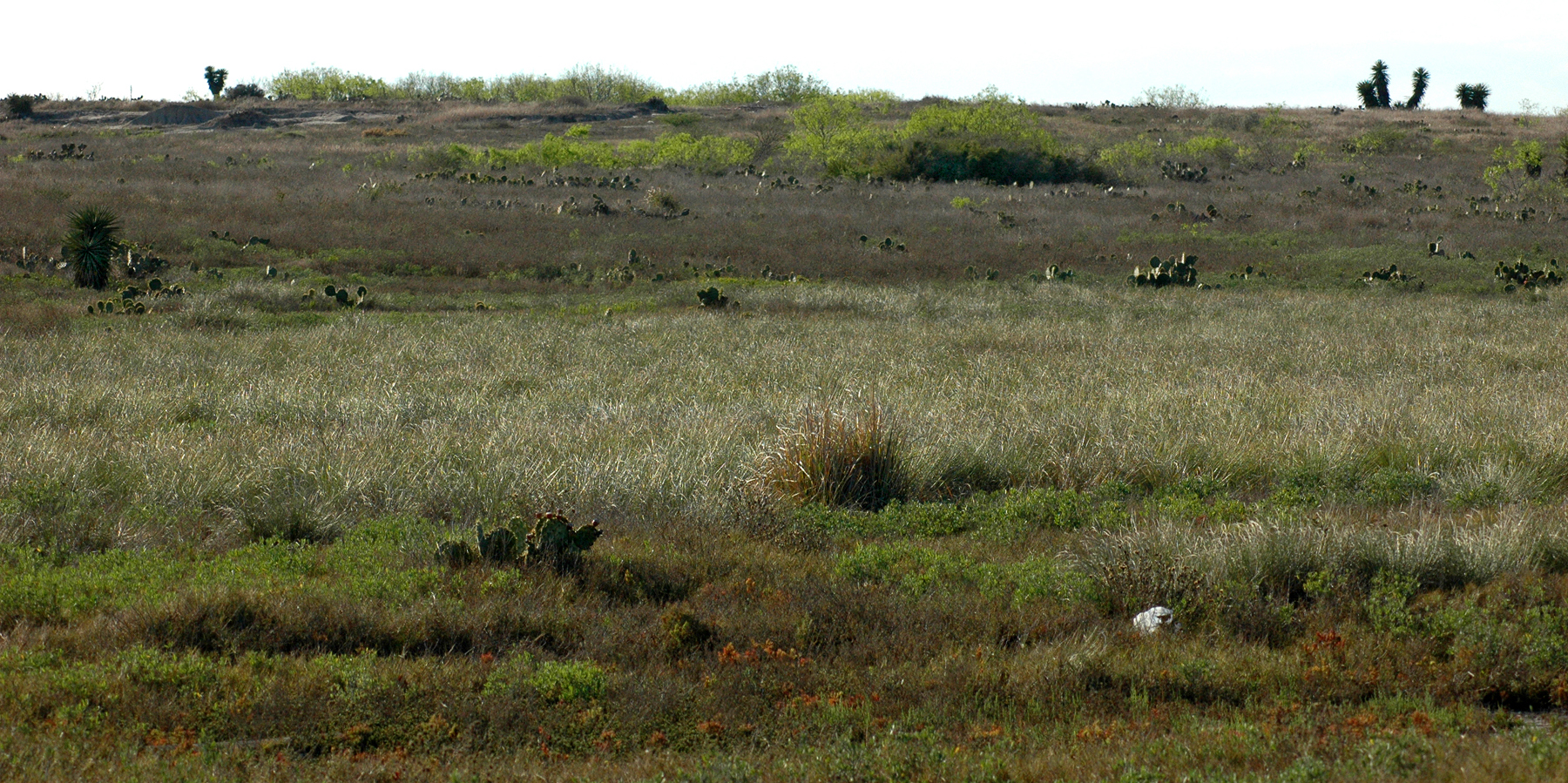
Grassland habitat on the road to Mezquital, Municipality of Matamoros, Tamaulipas, Mexico

== Adjacent municipalities and counties ==
- San Fernando Municipality - south
- Río Bravo Municipality - southwest and northwest
- Valle Hermoso Municipality - west
- Hidalgo County, Texas - north
- Cameron County, Texas - north

== Government ==
=== Mayors and municipal presidents ===
Ruler	Term	Office	Notes
Anastasio de Ayala	1797–1799	Mayor	
José Cayetano Girón	1800	Intendant	
Joséf de Gosearcochea	1801	Intendant	
Vicente López de Heredia	1803	Intendant	
José María Balli	1804	Intendant	
Vicente López de Herrera	1805	Intendant	
José de Jesús Solís	1806–1807	Intendant	
Matías Morales	1808	Intendant	
José Domingo de la Garza	1809–1810	Intendant	
José de Jesús Solís	1811–1812	Intendant	
José Marcelino Longoria	1813	Intendant	
Felipe Roque de la Portilla	1814	Intendant	
Blas María de la Garza	1815	Intendant	
José Domingo de la Garza	1816	Intendant	
Matías Morales	1817	Intendant	
Ramón García	1818	Intendant	
José Girón Girón	1819	Intendant	
José de Jesús Solís	1820	Intendant	
Juan José Chapa	1820	Intendant	
Pedro José García	1821	Intendant	
Domingo de la Garza	1822	Intendant	
Andrés Saldaña	1823	Intendant	
Juan B. García	1824	Intendant	
José María Girón	1825	Intendant	
José María Villarreal	1826	Prefect	
Andrés Saldaña	1827	Prefect	
Matías García	1828	Prefect	
Domingo de la Garza	1829	Prefect	
Manuel Galán	1830	Prefect	
José María Villarreal	1831	Prefect	
José María Girón	1832	Prefect	
José Espiridión de la Rosa	1833	Prefect	
Juan Longoria y Serna	1834	Prefect	
Francisco García Treviño	1835	Prefect	
Juan Nepomuceno Molano	1836	Prefect	
José María Tovar	1837	Prefect	
Constantino de Tavarna	1838	Prefect	
Jorge López de Lara	1839	Prefect	
Pedro de la Garza Treviño	1840	Prefect	
Francisco Valdez	1841	Prefect	
Victoriano T. Canales	1842	Prefect	
Juan Longoria y Serna	1843	Prefect	
Francisco Lojero	1844	Prefect	
Mariano Treviño Garza	1845	Prefect	
José María Girón	1846–1847	Prefect	
Francisco Valdez	1848	Prefect	
Victoriano T. Canales	1849	Prefect	
Pedro José de la Garz	1850	Prefect	
Macedonio Capistrán	1851	Prefect	
Rafael Quintero	1852	Prefect	
Albino López	1853	Prefect	
Antonio Longoria Guerra	1854	Prefect	
José María Cavazos	1855–1856	Prefect	
Albino López	1857	Prefect	
Leocadio Muñoz	1858	Prefect	
Antonio Longoria	1859	Prefect	
Matías Longoria	1860	Prefect	
José María Cavazos	1861–1862	Prefect	
Rafael Quintero	1863	Prefect	
Agapito Longoria	1864	Prefect	
Manuel Reyes Apresa	1865–1866	Prefect	
Felipe Márquez	1867	Political chief	
Juan Treviño Canales	1868	Political chief	
Pedro Hinojosa	1869–1870	Political chief	
Francisco F. Farías	1871	Political chief	
Agustín Menchaca	1872–1873	Political chief	
Juan N. Cortinas	1874–1875	Political chief	
Baltazar Fuentes	1876	Political chief	
Justo de la Garza	1877	Political chief	
Maximiliano Chapa	1878	Political chief	
Román de los Santos Coy	1879	Political chief	
Felipe Salazar	1880	Political chief	
Pedro Porras	1881	Political chief	
Tomás Márquez	1882–1883	Political chief	
Tomás Hinojosa	1884–1885	Political chief	
Pedro Barrón	1886	Political chief	
Melquiades Torres	1887–1888	Political chief	
Andrés González	1889	Political chief	
Cipriano Villanueva	1890	Political chief	
Alfredo M. Passament	1891	Political chief	
Rafael Solís	1892–1893	Political chief	
Miguel Barragán	1894	Political chief	
Antonio Cavazos	1895	Political chief	
Jorge Stroder	1896	Political chief	
Rafael Solís	1897	Political chief	
Cipriano Villanueva	1898	Political chief	
Rafael Solís	1898–1905	Political chief	
Marcelino Rougier	1906	Political chief	
Rafael Solís	1907	Political chief	
Procopia Guerra	1908–1909	Political chief	
Fructuoso Dávila	1910–1911	Political chief	
Alfredo Pumarejo	1912	Political chief	
Casimiro Sada	1913	Political chief	
Armando Chapa Gómez	1914–1915	Political chief	
Alejandro López	1916	Political chief	
Rafael González	1917	Municipal president	
Leónides Guerra	1918–1919	Municipal president	
Salvador Cárdenas	1920	Municipal president	
Miguel Elizondo	1920	Municipal president	
Juan José de la Garza	1920	Municipal president	
Miguel Elizondo	1921	Municipal president	
Mriano García Schreck	1921	Municipal president	
Miguel Elizondo	1922	Municipal president	
Conrado Gutiérrez	1923	Municipal president	
Luis R. Rendón	1924	Municipal president	
Prudencio Ruiz	1925	Municipal president	
Jesús María Cárdenas	1926	Municipal president	
Valentín Ramírez	1927	Municipal president	
Alfonso C. López	1927	Municipal president	
Antonio Martínez	1928	Municipal president	

Municipal president	Term	Political party	Notes
Guillermo Schears	1929–1930	PNR	
Roberto F. García	1931–1932	PNR	
Primitivo Schears	1933–1934	PNR	
Rafael Munguía	1935	PNR	
Roberto F. García	1936	PNR	
Ladislao Cárdenas	1937–1938	PNR	
Francisco Zárate	1938–1940	PRM	
Antonio de León	1941–1942	PRM	
Ladislao Cárdenas	1943–1945	PRM	
Ramiro T. Hernández	1946	PRI	
Tomás Saro	1947	PRI	
Leónides Guerra	1947–1948	PRI	
Ernesto L. Elizondo	1949–1951	PRI	
Juan B. García	1952	PRI	Acting municipal president
Luis Ramírez de Alba	1953–1954	PRI	
Augusto G. Cárdenas	1955–1957	PRI	
Miguel Treviño Emparam	1958–1960	PRI	
Virgilio Garza Ruiz	1961–1962	PRI	
Isidro González Saldaña	01-01-1963–31-12-1965	PRI	
Enrique Siller Flores	01-01-1966–31-12-1968	PRI	
Óscar Guerra Elizondo	01-01-1969–31-12-1971	PRI	
Sergio Martínez Calderoni	01-01-1972–31-12-1974	PRI	
Guillermo Guajardo González	01-01-1975–31-12-1977	PRI	
Antonio Cavazos Garza	01-01-1978–31-12-1980	PRI	
Jorge Cárdenas González	01-01-1981–31-12–1983	PARM	
Jesús Roberto Guerra Velazco	01-01-1984–31-12-1986	PRI	
Fernando Montemayor Lozano	01-01-1987–31-12-1989	PRI	
Jorge Cárdenas González	01-01-1990–31-12-1992	PRI	
Tomás Yarrington Ruvalcaba	01-01-1993–31-12-1995	PRI	
Antonio Ramón Sampayo Ortiz	01-01-1996–31-12-1998	PAN	
Homar Zamorano Ayala	01-01-1999–31-12-2001	PRI	
Mario Praxedis Zolezzi García	01-01-2002–31-12-2004	PRI	
Baltazar Manuel Hinojosa Ochoa	01-01-2005–31-12-2007	PRI	
Érick Agustín Silva Santos	01-01-2008–31-12-2010	PRI; Panal	
Víctor Alfonso Sánchez Garza	01-01-2011–2013	PRI; PVEM; Panal	
Leticia Salazar Vázquez	2013–2016	PAN	
Jesús Juan de la Garza Díaz del Guante	2016–2018	PRI; PVEM; Panal	
Mario Alberto López Hernández	2018–2021	PT; Morena; PES	Coalition "Together We Will Make History"
Mario Alberto López Hernández	2021–2024	PT; Morena	He was reelected on 06-06-2021. Applied for a leave.
Rubén Sauceda Lumbreras	2024	PT; Morena	Acting municipal president
José Alberto Granados Favila	2024–	PVEM; PT; Morena	Coalition "Sigamos Haciendo Historia" (Let's Keep Making History)
