= Hidalgo, Tamaulipas =

Villa Hidalgo Hidalgo
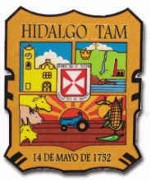
- Coat of arms

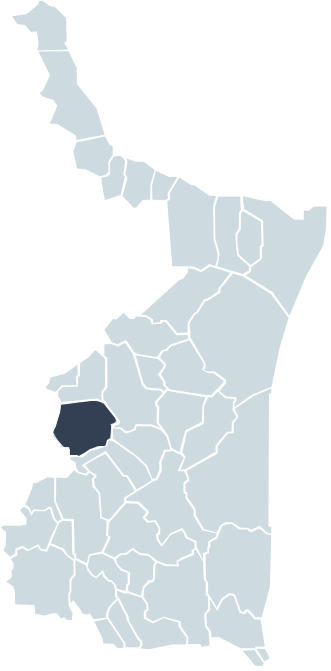
- Municipality of Villa Hidalgo
- Coordinates: 24°14′53″N 99°26′16″W
- Country: Mexico
- State: Tamaulipas
- Founded: May 19 1752

Area
  - Total: 2,142.43 km^{2} (827.20 sq mi)
- Elevation: 400 m (1,300 ft)

Population (2000)
  - Total: 24,281
- Time zone: UTC-6 (Central Standard Time)
- Postal Code: 87800
- Website: http://www.vhidalgo.gob.mx

Hidalgo Municipality (also, Villa Hidalgo) is a municipality located in the Mexican state of Tamaulipas. El Chorrito is a centre of pilgrimage in the municipality.

== Geography ==
=== Climate ===
The prevailing climate in Hidalgo is sub-humid and warm. Average rainfall is 700 millimeters, the minimum temperature is 2 °C and maximum of 41 °C.
