= Tampico Municipality =

Coordinates: 22.2951°N 97.9360°W

Tampico
- Municipality
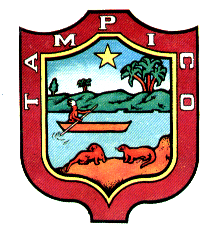
- Coat of arms

- Location in Mexico Tampico (Mexico)
- Country: Mexico
- State: Tamaulipas
- Demonym: (in Spanish)
- Time zone: UTC−06:00 (Zona Centro)

Tampico is a municipality located in the Mexican state of Tamaulipas. The largest city in it is Tampico. As of 2020, it had a population of 297,562 people.
