= Jaumave, Tamaulipas =

Coordinates: 23°25′N 99°23′W

Jaumave
- Municipality
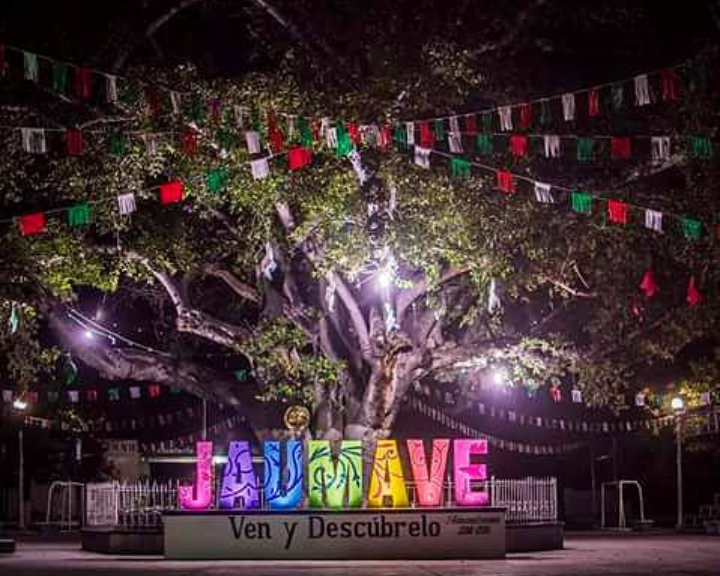

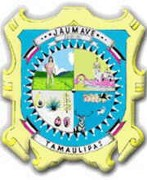
- Coat of arms

- Location in Mexico Jaumave (Mexico)
- Country: Mexico
- State: Tamaulipas
- Demonym: (in Spanish)
- Time zone: UTC−6 (CST)

Jaumave is a town and a municipality located in the Mexican state of Tamaulipas.
