= Tamaulipas Institute of Higher Education =

Instituto de Estudios Superiores de Tamaulipas
- Seal of IEST and Red de Universidades Anahuac
- Motto: Por la Fé y la Razón (English: For Faith and Reason)
- Type: Private
- Established: 1974
- Affiliations: ANUIES, FIMPES, CONAHEC
- Rector: Gloria Laura Septién Crespo
- Director: Luis Alfonso Díaz Hernández
- Location: Altamira, Tamaulipas, Mexico; 22°19′26.4″N 97°52′46.9″W
- Campus: 1
- Mascot: Delfín (Dolphin)
- Website: www.anahuac.mx/iest/

The Tamaulipas Institute of Higher Education (Spanish: Instituto de Estudios Superiores de Tamaulipas), or IEST for its acronym in Spanish, is a private university in Altamira, Tamaulipas, Mexico founded in 1974. It is one of the most recognized universities along with ITESM Campus Tampico in the southern area of the state of Tamaulipas. It serves all the metropolitan area of Tampico, Ciudad Madero and Altamira, the northern part of the state of Veracruz and the eastern part of the state of San Luis Potosí. Its campus consist of Campus Altamira, and Campus Cd. Valles located in Ciudad Valles, San Luís Potosí.

Since 2005, it has been officially allied with the Anahuac Universities Network.

== Organization ==
IEST's divisions consists of academic departments rather than faculties. Both undergraduate and graduate studies are available. IEST also provides the Preparatoria IEST (Secondary school), at campus Ciudad Valles, which consists of Upper and Lower Secondary Education (Preparatoria and Secundaria), with no undergraduate or graduate services.

=== Undergraduate ===
The academic departments, with their respective majors at campus Altamira for undergraduate level are:

- Humanities
  - Architecture
  - Graphic Design
  - Law
  - Languages
  - Philosophy
  - Psychology
- Exact Sciences
  - Chemistry
  - Information Technology and Telecommunications
  - Industry for Direction
  - Mechatronics
  - Petroleum and Renewable energy
- Management and Economics
  - Finance and Accounting
  - International Business
  - Gastronomy
  - Direction and Management
  - Marketing
  - Tourist Management

=== Graduate ===
The academic departments, with their respective masters at campus Altamira for graduate level are:

- Humanities
  - Education
  - Private law
- Management and Economics
  - Corporate finance
  - Direction and quality education
  - Logistics and international business
  - Management
  - Marketing management
  - Administration of human capital
  - Taxes
  - Quality
