= El Chorrito =

- Interactive map of El Chorrito
- Coordinates: 24°14′0″N 99°36′48″W
- Country: Mexico
- State: Tamaulipas
- Elevation: 740 m (2,430 ft)
- Time zone: UTC-6 (Central Standard Time)
  - Summer (DST): UTC-5 (Central Daylight Time)

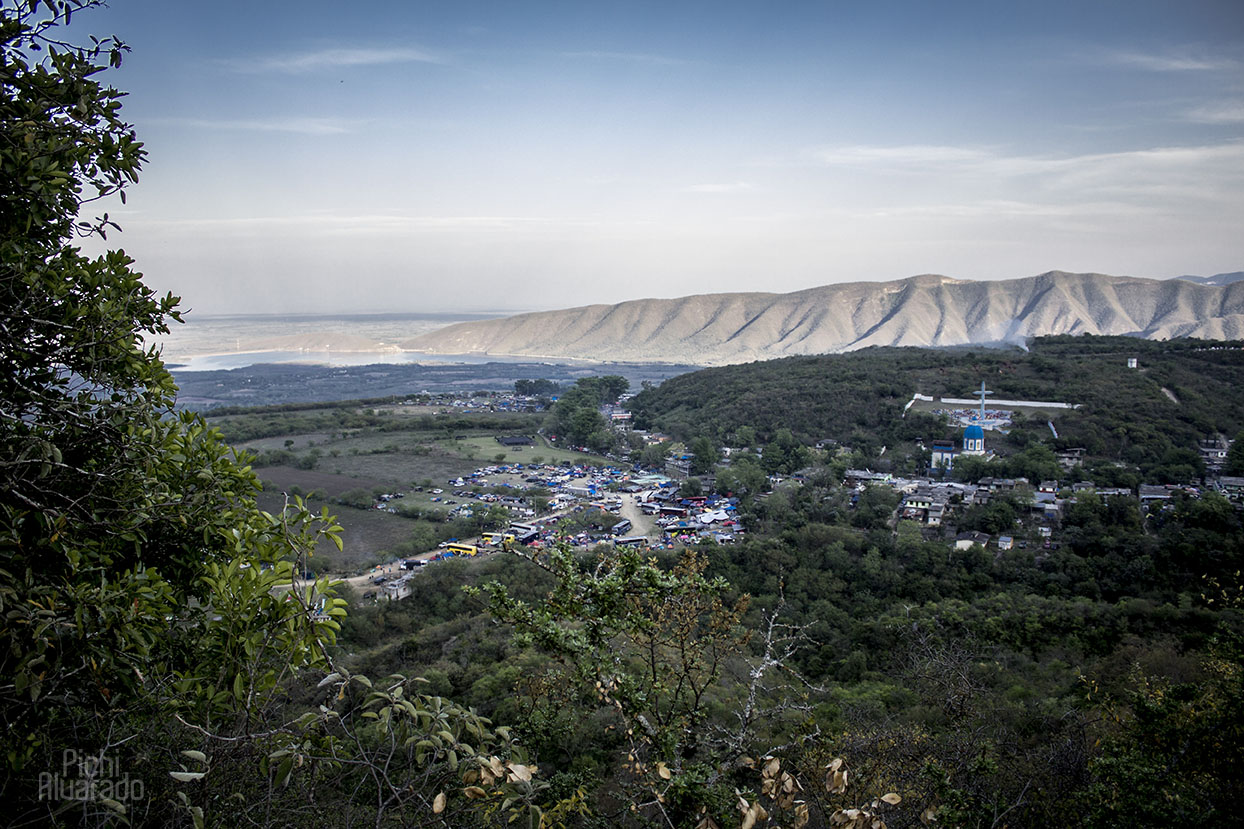
El Chorrito in 2018

El Chorrito is a pilgrimage center located in the municipality of Hidalgo, Tamaulipas.
