= Tampico metropolitan area =

- Metropolitan Area
- Zona Metropolitana de Tampico (Spanish)
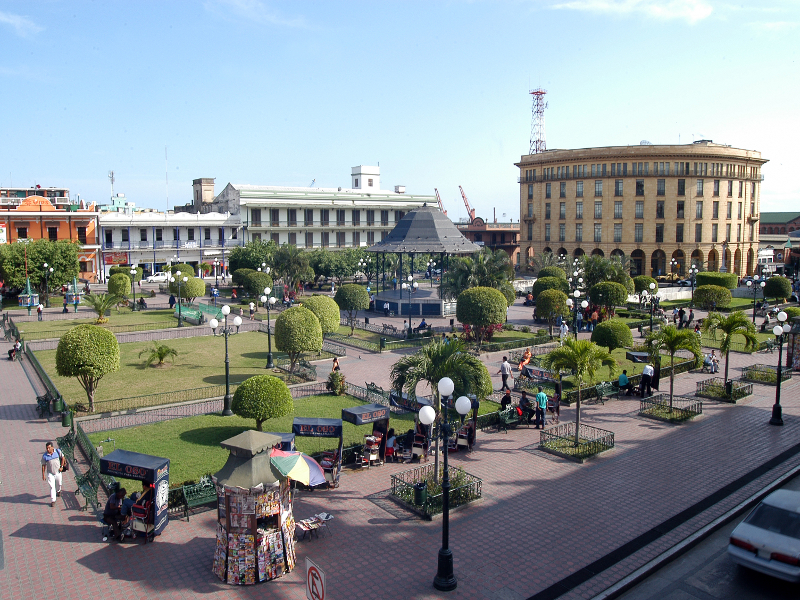
- Plaza de la Libertad in Tampico
Interactive Map of Tampico Metropolitan Area
City of Tampico / Ciudad de Tampico
Tampico Metro Area / Zona Metropolitana
- Country: Mexico
- State: Tamaulipas; Veracruz
- Principal cities: Tampico: Altamira; Ciudad Madero; Pánuco; Pueblo Viejo

Population
  - Metro: 864,584
- Time zone: UTC-6 (CST)

The Tampico metropolitan area is the third most populous metropolitan area in the state of Tamaulipas, in the country of Mexico. Its in-state metropolitan area of Tamaulipas includes the municipalities of Tampico, Ciudad Madero, Altamira. On the other hand, the out-of-state municipalities include Pueblo Viejo and Pánuco, from the state of Veracruz.

The metropolitan area of Tampico currently has a population of approximately 864,584.

== Populated Places ==
The metropolitan area of Tampico is formed by the following populated places:

=== In Tamaulipas ===
- Tampico: 309,003
- Ciudad Madero: 197,216
- Altamira: 212,001

=== In Veracruz ===
- Pueblo Viejo: 55,358
- Pánuco: 91,006

== See also ==
- Metropolitan areas of Mexico
- Laredo – Nuevo Laredo
- Reynosa—McAllen Metropolitan Area
- Matamoros—Brownsville Metropolitan Area
