= Villagrán, Tamaulipas =

Municipality in Tamaulipas, Mexico

Coordinates: 24°28′N 99°29′W

Villagrán
- Municipality
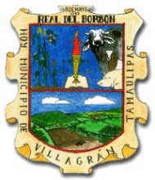
- Coat of arms

- Location in Mexico Villagrán (Mexico)
- Country: Mexico
- State: Tamaulipas
- Demonym: (in Spanish)
- Time zone: UTC−6 (CST)

Villagrán Municipality is a municipality in the Mexican state of Tamaulipas.
