= Altamirano, Tamaulipas =

Coordinates: 25°53′N 97°49′W

Altamirano is a village in Valle Hermoso Municipality in the Mexican state of Tamaulipas. It is located at latitude 25.88333 and longitude -97.81667. It is adjacent to the village of Empalme.
