= Río Bravo Municipality =

Coordinates: 25°59′N 98°05′W

Río Bravo
- Municipality
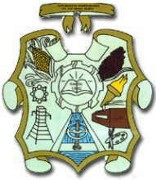
- Coat of arms

- Municipality of Río Bravo in Tamaulipas
- Country: Mexico
- State: Tamaulipas
- Municipal seat: Río Bravo

Population (2010)
  - Total: 118,259

Río Bravo Municipality is one of the municipalities in the Mexican state of Tamaulipas. The seat is at Río Bravo, Tamaulipas.

== Towns and villages ==
The largest localities (cities, towns, and villages) are:

Name	2010 Census Population
Río Bravo	95,647
Nuevo Progreso	10,178
Santa Apolonia	1,288
Cándido Aguilar	652
Ampliación Río Bravo	572
Brecha 124 con Vía de FFCC	568
Total Municipality	118,259

== Adjacent municipalities and counties ==
- Matamoros Municipality - northeast and southeast
- Valle Hermoso Municipality - east
- San Fernando Municipality - south
- Méndez Municipality - southwest
- Reynosa Municipality - west
- Hidalgo County, Texas - north
