= Miquihuana, Tamaulipas =

Coordinates: 23°34′N 99°47′W

Miquihuana
- Village
- Miquihuana
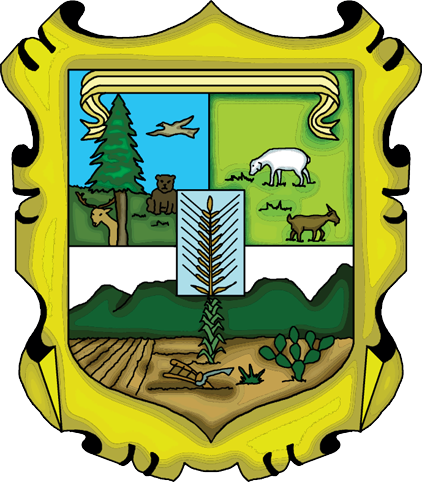
- Coat of arms

- Location within Tamaulipas Location within Mexico
- Country: Mexico
- State: Tamaulipas
- Foundation: May 10, 1849
- Founded as: Congregación de San Juan de Miquihuana
- Founder: Jesús Cárdenas Governor of Tamaulipas

Government
  - Municipal President (2018 - 2021): Baltasar Vargas Rangel (2020–present) PAN

Area
  - Total: 885 km^{2} (342 sq mi)

Population (2010)
  - Total: 3,555
  - Density: 4.02/km^{2} (10.4/sq mi)
- Demonym: Miquihuanés
- Time zone: UTC−6 (CST)
- Website: www.miquihuana.gob.mx

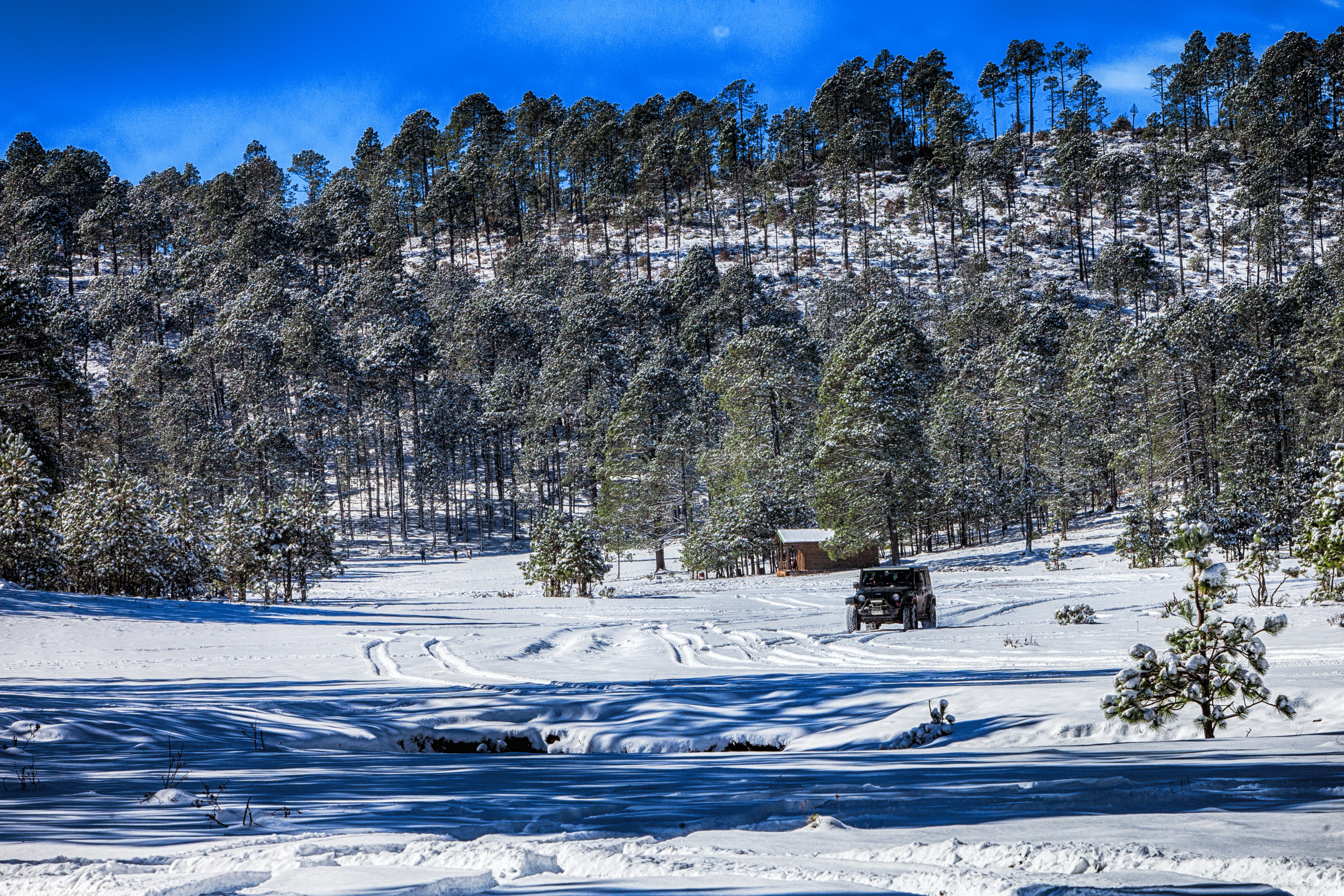

Miquihuana Municipality is a municipality located in the Mexican state of Tamaulipas.
