= Valle Hermoso Municipality =

Coordinates: 25.6964°N 97.8382°W

- Municipality
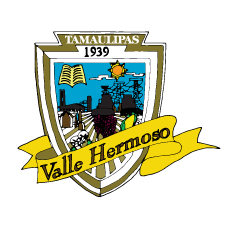
- Coat of arms

- Municipality of Valle Hermoso in Tamaulipas
- Country: Mexico
- State: Tamaulipas
- Municipal seat: Valle Hermoso

Population (2010)
  - Total: 63,170

Valle Hermoso Municipality (Beautiful Valley) is one of the municipalities in the Mexican state of Tamaulipas. The seat is at the city of Valle Hermoso. At the census of 2010 the city had a population of 48,918 inhabitants, while the municipality had a population of 63,170. The municipality has an area of 916.43 km^{2}. Its largest other localities are the towns of Anáhuac in the northeastern part of the municipality and El Realito to the west of the city of Valle Hermoso.

== Towns and villages ==
The largest localities (cities, towns, and villages) are:

Name	2010 Census Population
Valle Hermoso	48,918
Anáhuac	3,642
El Realito	3,228
Ignacio Manuel Altamirano	887
Empalme	778
Ensenada	569
Total Municipality	63,170

== Adjacent municipalities ==
- Río Bravo Municipality - west
- Matamoros Municipality - east
- Hidalgo County, Texas - north
