= Reynosa Municipality =

Reynosa
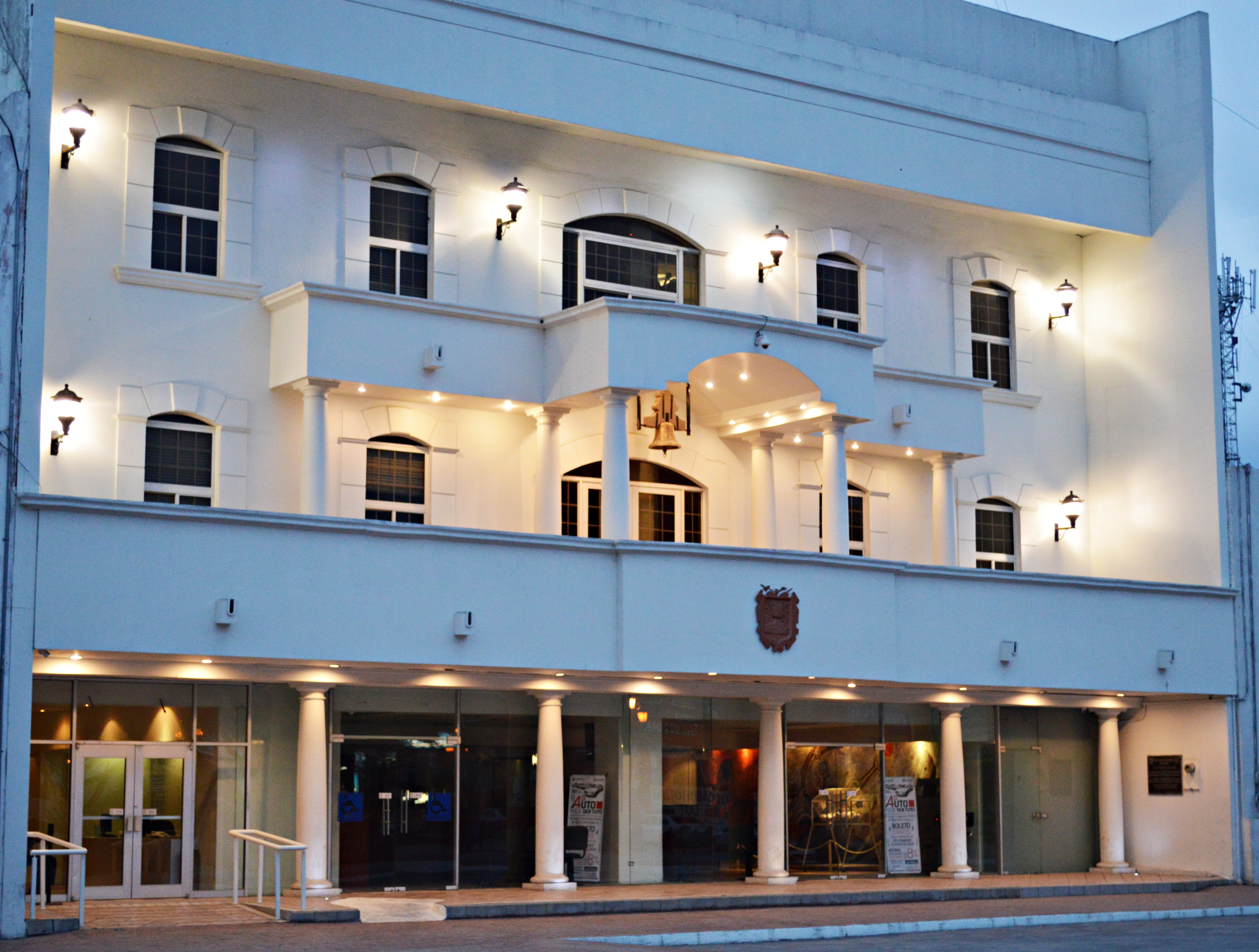
- City Hall

- Coat of arms

- Coordinates: 26.0833°N 98.2833°W
- Country: Mexico
- State: Tamaulipas

Government
  - Mayor: Carlos Victor Peña Ortiz (2021-present) (MORENA PT)

Area
  - Total: 3,147 km^{2} (1,215 sq mi)
- Elevation: 33 m (108 ft)

Population (2020)
  - Total: 704,767
  - Density: 223.9/km^{2} (580.0/sq mi)
- Time zone: UTC–06:00 (Zona Centro)
  - Summer (DST): UTC–05:00 (DST)

Reynosa is a municipality located in the Mexican state of Tamaulipas. It includes the city of Reynosa. In population, both the municipality and the city (locality) are the largest in their respective categories in the state of Tamaulipas.

== Towns and villages ==
The largest localities (cities, towns, and villages) are:

Name	2020 Census Population
Reynosa	691,557
Los Cavazos	2,094
Alfredo V. Bonfil (Periquitos)	1,606
Vamos Tamaulipas	1,145
CERESO Dos	979
Total Municipality	704,767

== Adjacent municipalities and counties ==
- Río Bravo Municipality - east
- Méndez Municipality - south
- China Municipality, Nuevo León - southwest
- General Bravo Municipality, Nuevo León - west
- Gustavo Díaz Ordaz Municipality - west, northwest
- Hidalgo County, Texas - north
