= Bustamante Municipality =

Coordinates: 23°26′N 99°45′W

Bustamante
- Municipality
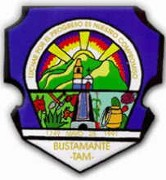
- Coat of arms

- Location in Mexico Bustamante (Mexico)
- Country: Mexico
- State: Tamaulipas
- Demonym: (in Spanish)
- Time zone: UTC−6 (CST)

Bustamante is a municipality located in the Mexican state of Tamaulipas.

== Climate ==
Climate data for Bustamante (1991–2020)
Month	Jan	Feb	Mar	Apr	May	Jun	Jul	Aug	Sep	Oct	Nov	Dec	Year
Record high °C (°F)	37 (99)	38 (100)	44 (111)	47 (117)	39 (102)	39 (102)	40 (104)	38 (100)	39 (102)	35 (95)	38 (100)	37 (99)	47 (117)
Mean daily maximum °C (°F)	19.9 (67.8)	22.5 (72.5)	25.8 (78.4)	27.7 (81.9)	27.7 (81.9)	27.2 (81.0)	26.6 (79.9)	27.1 (80.8)	25.1 (77.2)	24.2 (75.6)	22.1 (71.8)	20.0 (68.0)	24.7 (76.5)
Daily mean °C (°F)	12.5 (54.5)	14.3 (57.7)	17.0 (62.6)	19.0 (66.2)	19.6 (67.3)	20.0 (68.0)	19.5 (67.1)	19.9 (67.8)	18.4 (65.1)	16.9 (62.4)	14.7 (58.5)	12.8 (55.0)	17.0 (62.6)
Mean daily minimum °C (°F)	5.0 (41.0)	6.1 (43.0)	8.2 (46.8)	10.2 (50.4)	11.5 (52.7)	12.8 (55.0)	12.5 (54.5)	12.6 (54.7)	11.8 (53.2)	9.6 (49.3)	7.4 (45.3)	5.7 (42.3)	9.4 (48.9)
Record low °C (°F)	−4 (25)	−4 (25)	−2 (28)	1 (34)	−1 (30)	−1 (30)	3 (37)	3 (37)	1 (34)	0.0 (32.0)	−3 (27)	−5 (23)	−5 (23)
Average precipitation mm (inches)	43.2 (1.70)	10.7 (0.42)	7.5 (0.30)	29.8 (1.17)	78.1 (3.07)	82.4 (3.24)	73.2 (2.88)	70.1 (2.76)	75.0 (2.95)	34.6 (1.36)	13.0 (0.51)	11.0 (0.43)	528.6 (20.81)
Average precipitation days (≥ 0.1 mm)	3.0	2.1	1.1	3.3	7.3	7.9	7.0	6.2	6.4	3.6	1.6	1.4	50.9
Source: Servicio Meteorologico Nacional (precipitation 1981-2010)
