= Nuevo Morelos =

Coordinates: 22°32′N 99°13′W

- Municipality
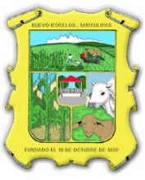
- Coat of arms

- Location in Mexico Nuevo Morelos (Mexico)
- Country: Mexico
- State: Tamaulipas
- Demonym: (in Spanish)
- Time zone: UTC−06:00 (Zona Centro)
- Area code: +52 482

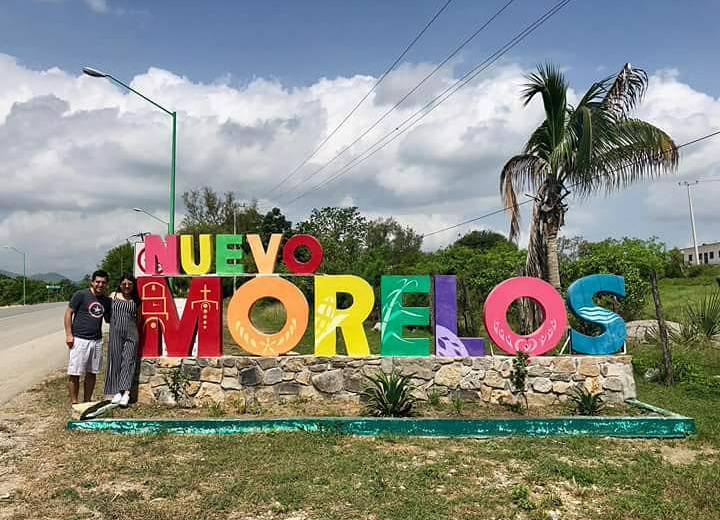

Nuevo Morelos is a town and its surrounding municipality in the Mexican state of Tamaulipas.
