= San Nicolás, Tamaulipas =

Coordinates: 24°41′N 98°49′W

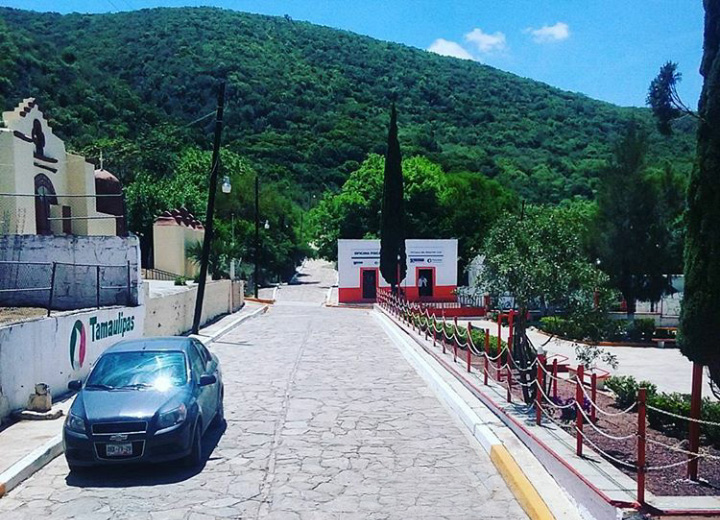

San Nicolás is a populated place in San Nicolás Municipality, in the Mexican state of Tamaulipas. It was founded on 1 April 1768.
