= San Nicolás Municipality, Tamaulipas =

Coordinates: 16°26′N 96°45′W

San Nicolás
- Municipality
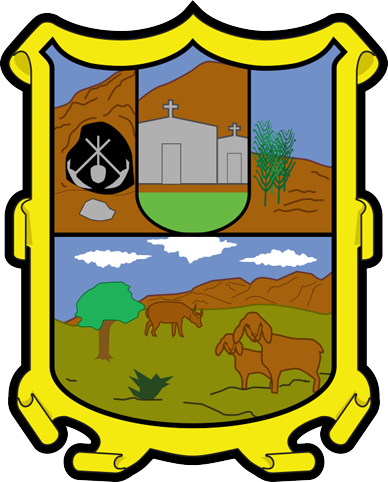
- Coat of arms

- Location in Mexico San Nicolás (Mexico)
- Country: Mexico
- State: Tamaulipas
- Demonym: (in Spanish)
- Time zone: UTC−6 (CST)

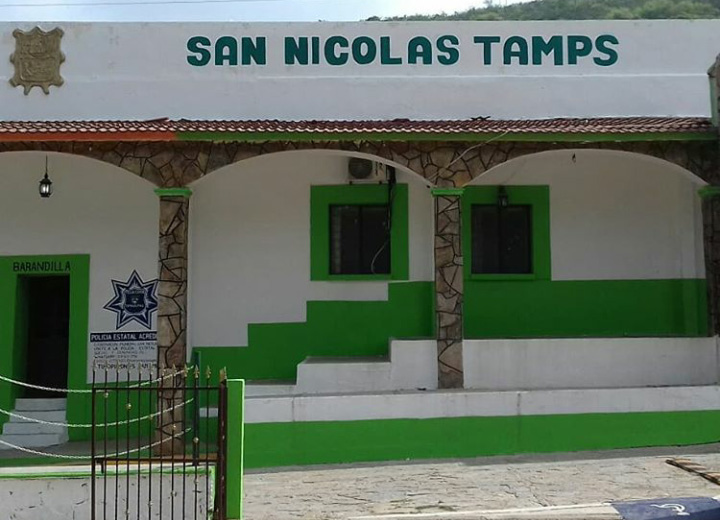

San Nicolás is a municipality located in the Mexican state of Tamaulipas. It contains the settlement of San Nicolás.
