= Casas Municipality =

Municipality in Tamaulipas, Mexico

Coordinates: 23°43′N 98°44′W

Casas
- Municipality
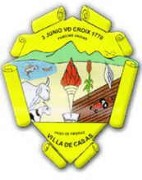
- Coat of arms

- Location in Mexico Casas (Mexico)
- Country: Mexico
- State: Tamaulipas
- Demonym: (in Spanish)
- Time zone: UTC−6 (CST)

Casas is a municipality located in the Mexican state of Tamaulipas.
