= Jiménez, Tamaulipas =

Municipality in Tamaulipas, Mexico

Coordinates: 24°13′N 98°29′W

Jiménez
- Municipality
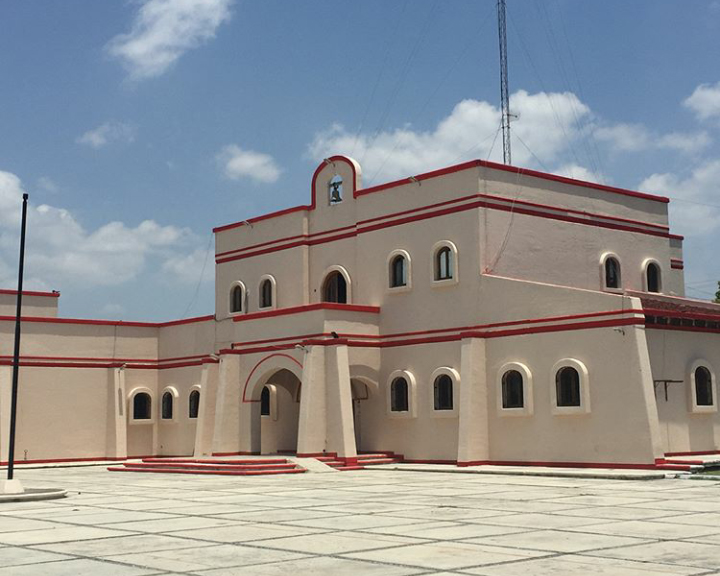

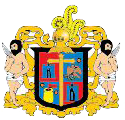
- Coat of arms

- Location in Mexico Jiménez (Mexico)
- Country: Mexico
- State: Tamaulipas
- Demonym: (in Spanish)
- Time zone: UTC−6 (CST)

Jiménez is a municipality located in the Mexican state of Tamaulipas. Its municipal seat is the town of Santander Jiménez.

== History ==
It was founded on February 17, 1749, as Santander by Pedro Saldívar Cantú in recognition of his Basque Spanish roots. By decree of the State Congress on October 31, 1827, Santander was renamed Jiménez to honor the memory of Colonel Juan Nepomuceno Jiménez.

== Climate ==
Climate data for Jiménez, Tamaulipas (1991–2020)
| Month | Jan | Feb | Mar | Apr | May | Jun | Jul | Aug | Sep | Oct | Nov | Dec | Year |
|---|---|---|---|---|---|---|---|---|---|---|---|---|---|
| Record high °C (°F) | 40.0 (104.0) | 41.0 (105.8) | 43.0 (109.4) | 46.5 (115.7) | 45.0 (113.0) | 45.5 (113.9) | 49.0 (120.2) | 48.0 (118.4) | 44.0 (111.2) | 45.0 (113.0) | 39.0 (102.2) | 39.0 (102.2) | 49.0 (120.2) |
| Mean daily maximum °C (°F) | 24.4 (75.9) | 27.4 (81.3) | 29.8 (85.6) | 33.2 (91.8) | 35.1 (95.2) | 36.2 (97.2) | 36.5 (97.7) | 37.2 (99.0) | 34.4 (93.9) | 32.0 (89.6) | 28.0 (82.4) | 25.0 (77.0) | 31.6 (88.9) |
| Daily mean °C (°F) | 18.1 (64.6) | 20.4 (68.7) | 23.1 (73.6) | 26.4 (79.5) | 28.8 (83.8) | 30.3 (86.5) | 30.5 (86.9) | 30.8 (87.4) | 28.9 (84.0) | 26.3 (79.3) | 21.8 (71.2) | 18.7 (65.7) | 25.3 (77.5) |
| Mean daily minimum °C (°F) | 11.7 (53.1) | 13.5 (56.3) | 16.5 (61.7) | 19.7 (67.5) | 22.5 (72.5) | 24.3 (75.7) | 24.4 (75.9) | 24.5 (76.1) | 23.4 (74.1) | 20.5 (68.9) | 15.6 (60.1) | 12.4 (54.3) | 19.1 (66.4) |
| Record low °C (°F) | −3.0 (26.6) | −2.0 (28.4) | 1.0 (33.8) | 5.0 (41.0) | 10.5 (50.9) | 12.0 (53.6) | 11.0 (51.8) | 2.0 (35.6) | 10.0 (50.0) | 1.0 (33.8) | 0.0 (32.0) | −6.0 (21.2) | −6.0 (21.2) |
| Average precipitation mm (inches) | 23.8 (0.94) | 18.1 (0.71) | 23.6 (0.93) | 40.3 (1.59) | 50.3 (1.98) | 100.5 (3.96) | 64.0 (2.52) | 67.0 (2.64) | 108.3 (4.26) | 64.2 (2.53) | 22.8 (0.90) | 15.7 (0.62) | 598.6 (23.57) |
| Average rainy days | 4.2 | 2.8 | 3.4 | 3.5 | 4.9 | 5.7 | 3.6 | 4.5 | 6.7 | 4.9 | 3.1 | 2.8 | 50.1 |
Source: Servicio Meteorologico Nacional
