= Güémez Municipality =

Coordinates: 23°56′N 99°00′W

Güémez
- Municipality
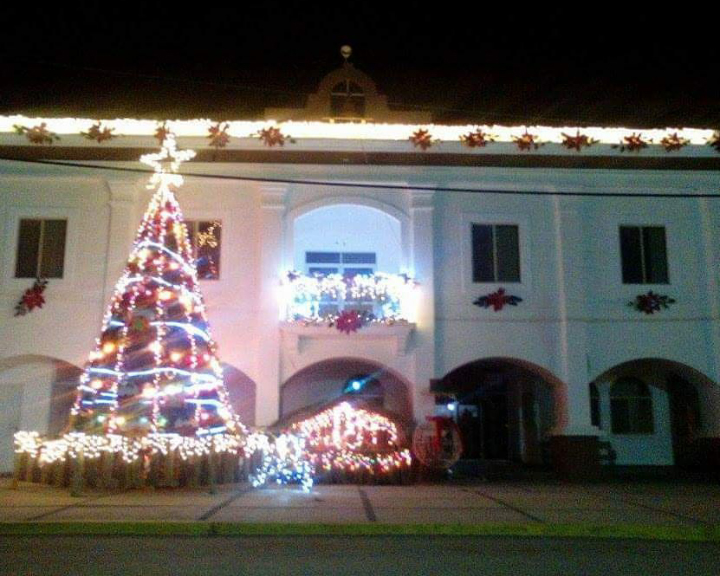
- Town hall

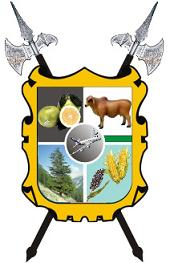
- Coat of arms

- Location in Mexico Güémez (Mexico)
- Country: Mexico
- State: Tamaulipas
- Demonym: (in Spanish)
- Time zone: UTC−6 (CST)

Güémez Municipality is a municipality located in the Mexican state of Tamaulipas. It is known in Mexico for being the hometown of the "Güémez Philosopher", a somewhat fictional wise man who uses simple ideas to explain complex situations.
