= Xicoténcatl, Tamaulipas =

Coordinates: 22°59′N 98°56′W

Xicoténcatl
- Municipality
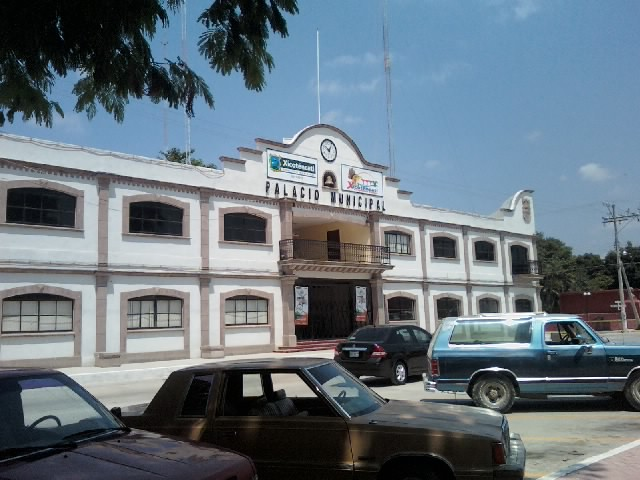

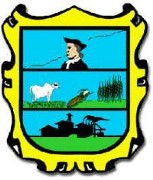
- Coat of arms

- Location in Mexico Xicoténcatl (Mexico)
- Country: Mexico
- State: Tamaulipas
- Demonym: (in Spanish)
- Time zone: UTC−6 (CST)

Xicoténcatl is a city and its surrounding municipality in the Mexican state of Tamaulipas. On March 15, 1751, it was founded as Villa de Escandón. On October 27, 1828, it was renamed Xicoténcatl.
