= Valle Hermoso, Tamaulipas =

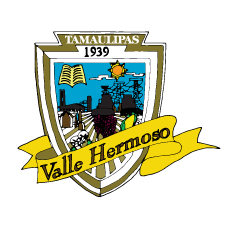
- Coat of arms

- Location within Tamaulipas Location within Mexico
- Coordinates: 25°40′25″N 97°48′52″W
- Country: Mexico
- State: Tamaulipas
- Municipality: Valle Hermoso

Government
  - Mayor: Alberto Alanís Villarreal (PAN)
- Elevation: 28 m (92 ft)

Population (2020)
  - Total: 48,172
- Time zone: UTC–06:00 (Zona Centro)
  - Summer (DST): UTC–05:00 (DST)
- Postal code: 87500
- Area code: 894
- Website: Official Site

Valle Hermoso is the main city in the municipality of Valle Hermoso in the northeastern part of the Mexican state of Tamaulipas. The city serves as the municipal seat of the municipality, which is bordered by the municipalities of Matamoros and Río Bravo. In the 2020 census, the city had a population of 48,172 inhabitants, while the municipality had a population of 60,055.
