= Aldama (surname) =

Aldama is a surname. Notable people with the surname include:

- Andrés Aldama (born 1956), Cuban boxer
- Frederick Luis Aldama (born 1969), American academic
- Juan Aldama (1774–1811), insurgent leader in the Mexican War of Independence
- Monica Aldama (born 1970), American cheerleading coach
- Santiago Aldama (born 1968), Spanish basketball player
- Santi Aldama (born 2001), Spanish basketball player and son of Santiago
- Yamilé Aldama (born 1972), triple-jumper from Cuba who has represented both Sudan and Great Britain
