= San Carlos Municipality, Tamaulipas =

Coordinates: 24.4029°N 98.9890°W

San Carlos
- Municipality
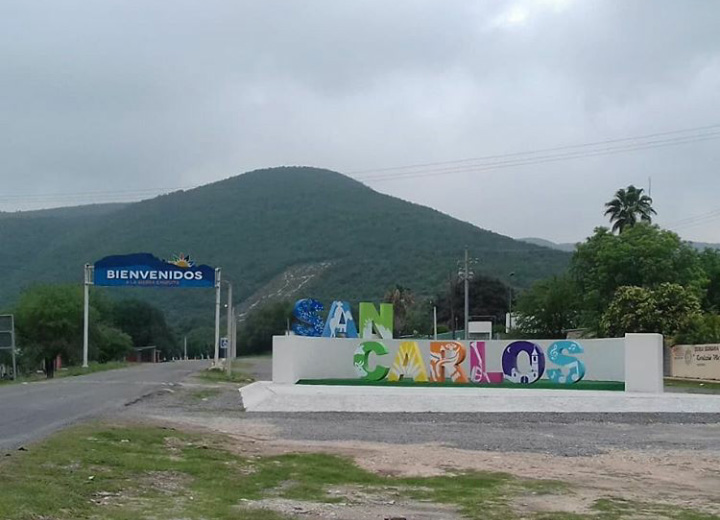

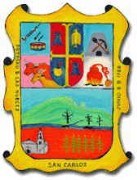
- Coat of arms
- Interactive map of San Carlos
- Country: Mexico
- State: Tamaulipas
- Municipal seat: San Carlos

Population (2010)
  - Total: 9,331

San Carlos Municipality is a municipality located in the Mexican state of Tamaulipas. The municipal seat is located in the town of San Carlos.

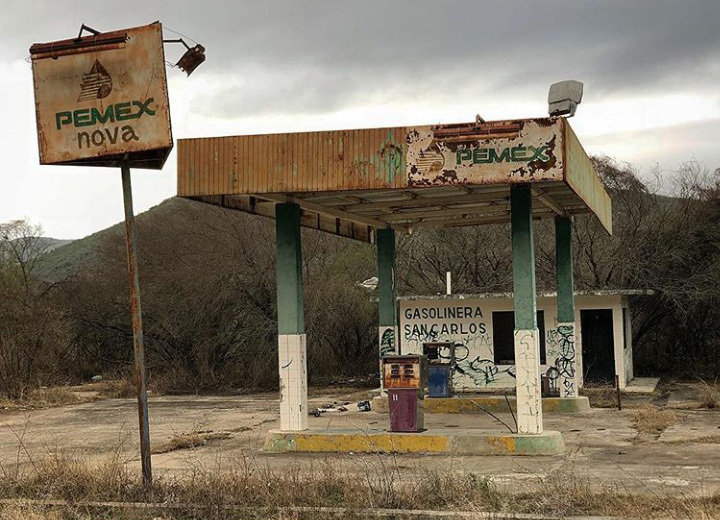
