= Antiguo Morelos Municipality =

Coordinates: 22°33′N 99°05′W

Antiguo Morelos
- Municipality
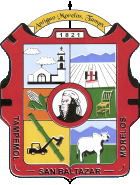
- Coat of arms

- Location in Mexico Antiguo Morelos (Mexico)
- Country: Mexico
- State: Tamaulipas
- Demonym: (in Spanish)
- Time zone: UTC−6 (CST)

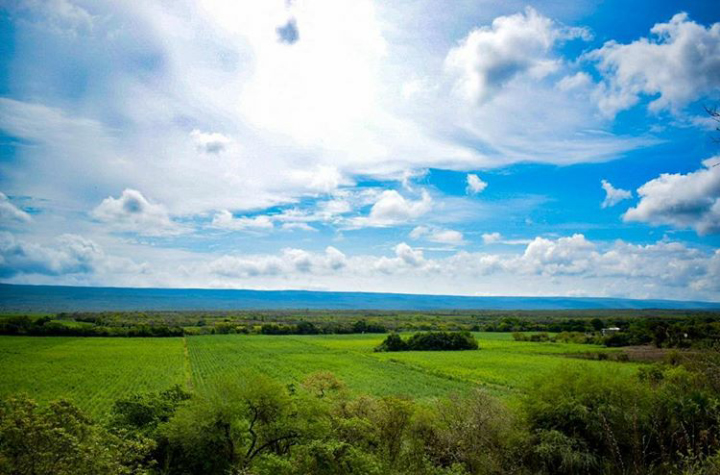

Antiguo Morelos is a municipality located in the Mexican state of Tamaulipas.
