= Río Bravo, Tamaulipas =

Río Bravo El pueblo de la Virgen del Rio Bravo
- Ciudad Rio Bravo, Tamaulipas
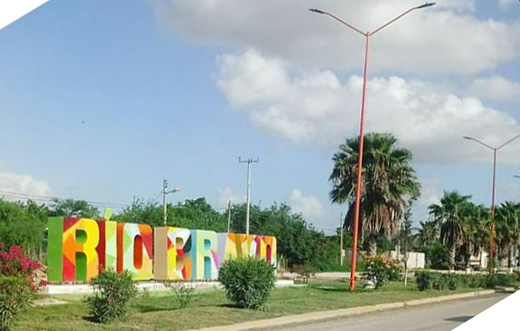
- Rio Bravo City

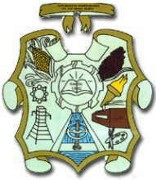
- Coat of arms
- Nicknames: Rio Bravo, Rio, RB
- Motto: Spanish: Juntos, seguimos haciendo historia! (Together, we continue making history!)
- Location within Tamaulipas Location within Mexico
- Coordinates: 25°59′10″N 98°05′20″W
- Country: Mexico
- State: Tamaulipas
- Municipality: Río Bravo
- Elevation: 30 m (98 ft)

Population (2014)
  - Total: 101,481
- Time zone: UTC−06:00 (Zona Centro)
  - Summer (DST): UTC−05:00 (DST)

Río Bravo, formally Ciudad Río Bravo, is a city on the northern border of the state of Tamaulipas in northeastern Mexico.

It is the municipal seat of Río Bravo Municipality.

== Geography ==
The city lies in the Rio Grande Valley on the south of the Río Bravo del Norte (American synonym: Rio Grande), and was named after the river.

It is also around 5 miles (8.0 km) south of the Mexico–United States border with Texas. It is east of Reynosa. North across the border and the Donna – Río Bravo International Bridge over the Río Bravo/Rio Grande are the Texan towns of Scissors, and Donna on Farm to Market Road 493.

Río Bravo Municipality stretches southward into less densely populated territory, and is slowly becoming a large and popular industrial center conveniently located along the Reynosa−Matamoros highway between the booming "Maquiladora" centers in Reynosa and Matamoros. Mexican Federal Highway 2 passes through the city, paralleling the border.

== Populations ==
At the census of 2010, the city reported a population of 95,647, the eighth largest city in the state, following Reynosa, Matamoros, Nuevo Laredo, Ciudad Victoria, Tampico, Madero, and Miramar. The next largest community within the municipality is Nuevo Progreso, in the northeastern area on the Río Bravo/Río Grande.

The municipality had a population of 118,259, and an areal extent of 1,562.94 km^{2} (603.45 sq mi).
