= Altamira, Tamaulipas =

Coordinates: 22°20′15″N 97°52′10″W

Cd Altamira
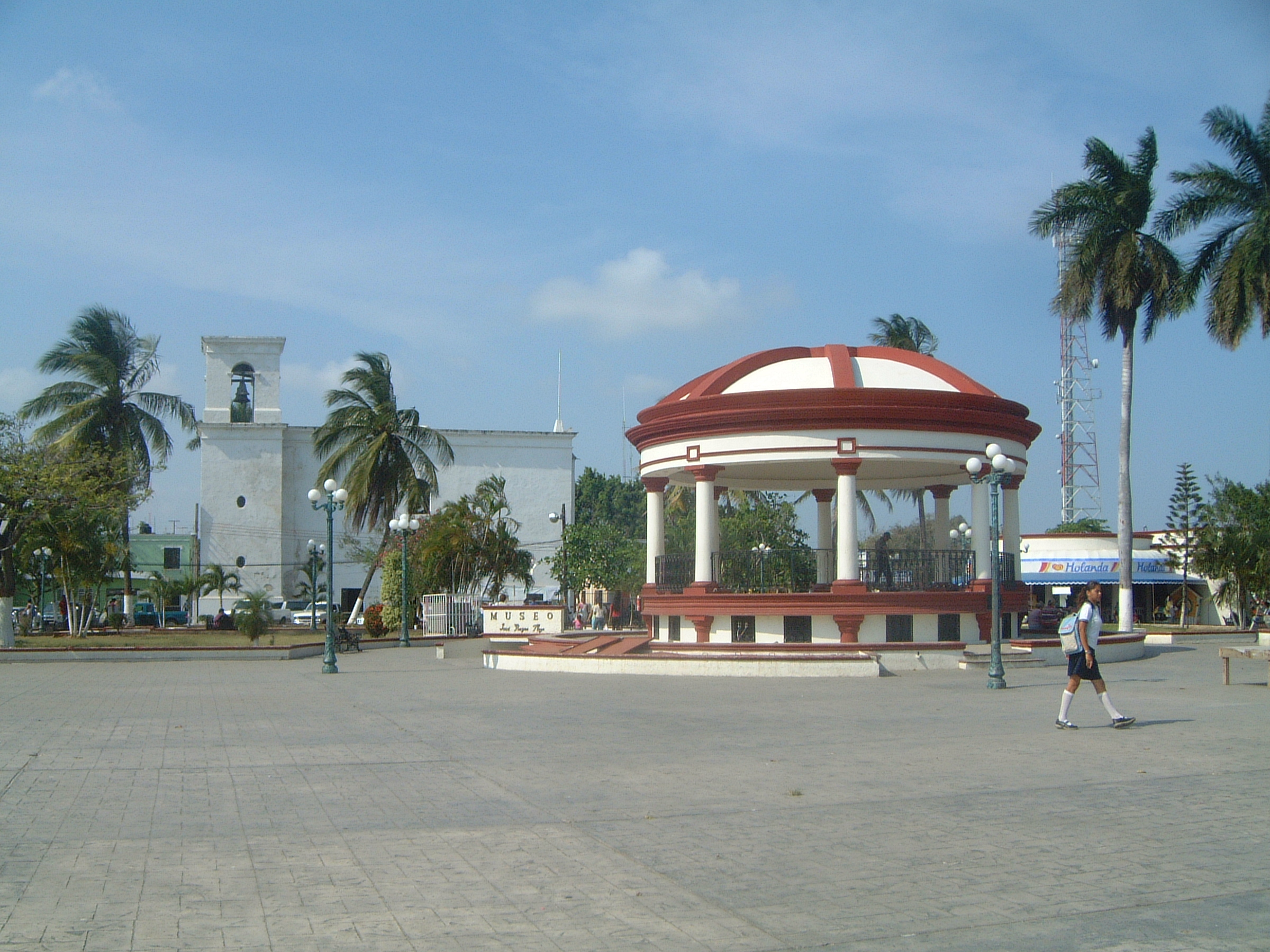
- Plaza of Altamira

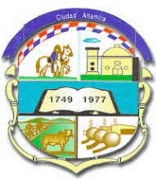
- Coat of arms

- Location Altamira within Tamaulipas

- Location of Tamaulipas within mexico
- Country: Mexico
- State: Tamaulipas
- Municipality: Altamira
- Settled: May 2, 1949

Government
  - Presidente Municipal: Alma Laura Amparan (PAN)

Population (2020 census)
  - City: 79,824
  - Metro: 859,419
- Time zone: UTC-6 (CST)
- Codigo Postal: 89600
- Area code: 833
- Website: Municipio de Altamira

Altamira is a port city on the Gulf of Mexico and is located near the southeastern tip of the state of Tamaulipas in Mexico. It is the second-largest city in the municipality of Altamira. To the south is Tampico, also in this state.

The city is part of the Tampico Metropolitan Area. Its port business is mostly containerized cargo for ocean-going ships. According to the INEGI 2010 census, the city has a population of 59,536, the tenth-largest in the state.

== Climate ==
Climate data for Altamira (1991–2020)
Month	Jan	Feb	Mar	Apr	May	Jun	Jul	Aug	Sep	Oct	Nov	Dec	Year
Record high °C (°F)	37.0 (98.6)	37.0 (98.6)	42.0 (107.6)	41.0 (105.8)	46.0 (114.8)	39.0 (102.2)	44.0 (111.2)	42.0 (107.6)	42.0 (107.6)	41.0 (105.8)	42.0 (107.6)	38.0 (100.4)	46.0 (114.8)
Mean daily maximum °C (°F)	26.2 (79.2)	27.8 (82.0)	29.6 (85.3)	31.6 (88.9)	34.0 (93.2)	33.9 (93.0)	33.8 (92.8)	34.6 (94.3)	33.5 (92.3)	32.0 (89.6)	30.0 (86.0)	27.6 (81.7)	31.2 (88.2)
Daily mean °C (°F)	19.2 (66.6)	20.6 (69.1)	22.6 (72.7)	25.1 (77.2)	27.1 (80.8)	27.7 (81.9)	27.7 (81.9)	28.1 (82.6)	27.3 (81.1)	25.6 (78.1)	22.6 (72.7)	20.1 (68.2)	24.5 (76.1)
Mean daily minimum °C (°F)	12.1 (53.8)	13.3 (55.9)	15.7 (60.3)	18.5 (65.3)	20.2 (68.4)	21.5 (70.7)	21.6 (70.9)	21.6 (70.9)	21.2 (70.2)	19.1 (66.4)	15.3 (59.5)	12.7 (54.9)	17.7 (63.9)
Record low °C (°F)	2.0 (35.6)	1.0 (33.8)	2.5 (36.5)	3.0 (37.4)	4.0 (39.2)	4.0 (39.2)	4.0 (39.2)	4.0 (39.2)	4.0 (39.2)	3.0 (37.4)	0.9 (33.6)	−4.0 (24.8)	−4.0 (24.8)
Average precipitation mm (inches)	41.3 (1.63)	16.4 (0.65)	30.6 (1.20)	23.1 (0.91)	29.8 (1.17)	151.5 (5.96)	136.9 (5.39)	115.6 (4.55)	238.8 (9.40)	137.7 (5.42)	46.2 (1.82)	18.2 (0.72)	986.1 (38.82)
Average precipitation days (≥ 0.1 mm)	6.9	3.6	4.9	3.1	4.2	9.3	8.4	9.1	13.4	8.8	6.8	4.8	83.3
Source: Servicio Meteorologico Nacional
