= Cruillas Municipality =

Municipality in Tamaulipas, Mexico

Coordinates: 24°45′N 98°31′W

Cruillas
- Municipality
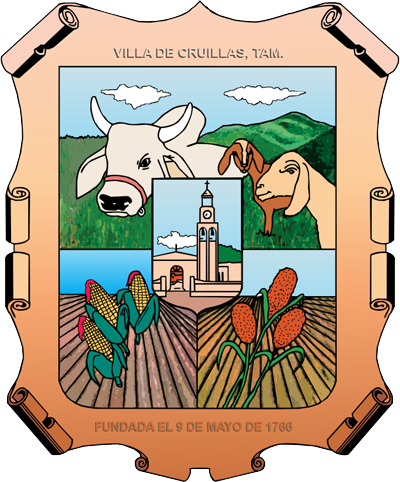
- Coat of arms

- Location in Mexico Cruillas (Mexico)
- Country: Mexico
- State: Tamaulipas
- Demonym: (in Spanish)
- Time zone: UTC−6 (CST)

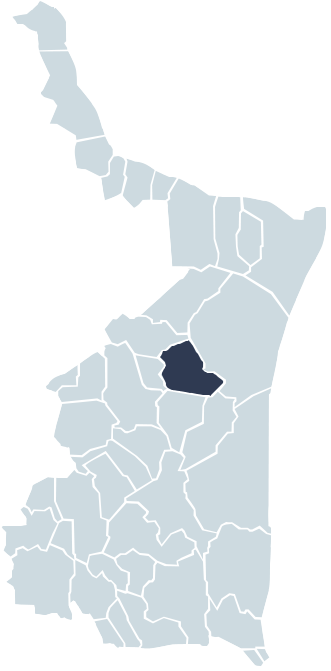

Cruillas is a municipality located in the Mexican state of Tamaulipas.
