= González Municipality, Tamaulipas =

Coordinates: 22.828°N 98.431°W

González
- Municipality
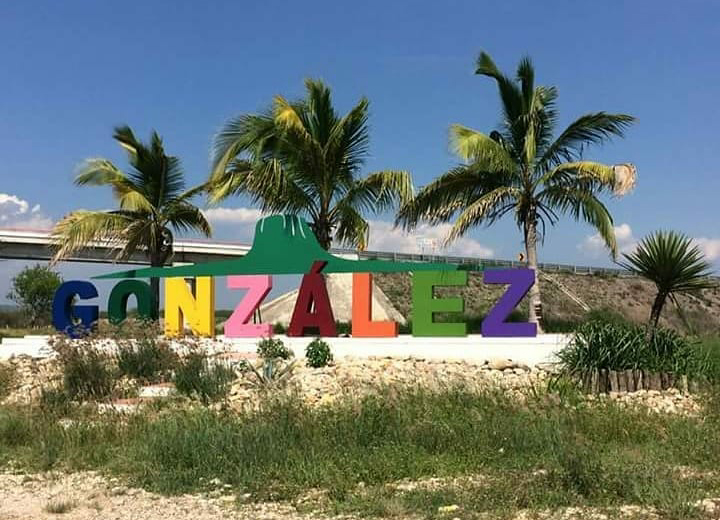

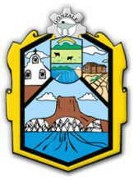
- Coat of arms

- Location in Mexico González (Mexico)
- Country: Mexico
- State: Tamaulipas
- Demonym: (in Spanish)
- Time zone: UTC−6 (CST)

González is a municipality located in the Mexican state of Tamaulipas.
