= Méndez Municipality =

Coordinates: 25°07′N 98°35′W

Méndez
- Municipality
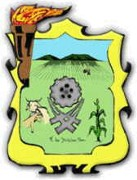
- Coat of arms

- Location in Mexico Méndez (Mexico)
- Country: Mexico
- State: Tamaulipas
- Demonym: (in Spanish)
- Time zone: UTC−6 (CST)

Méndez Municipality is a municipality located in the Mexican state of Tamaulipas.
