= Ludwika Paleta =

Polish-Mexican actress

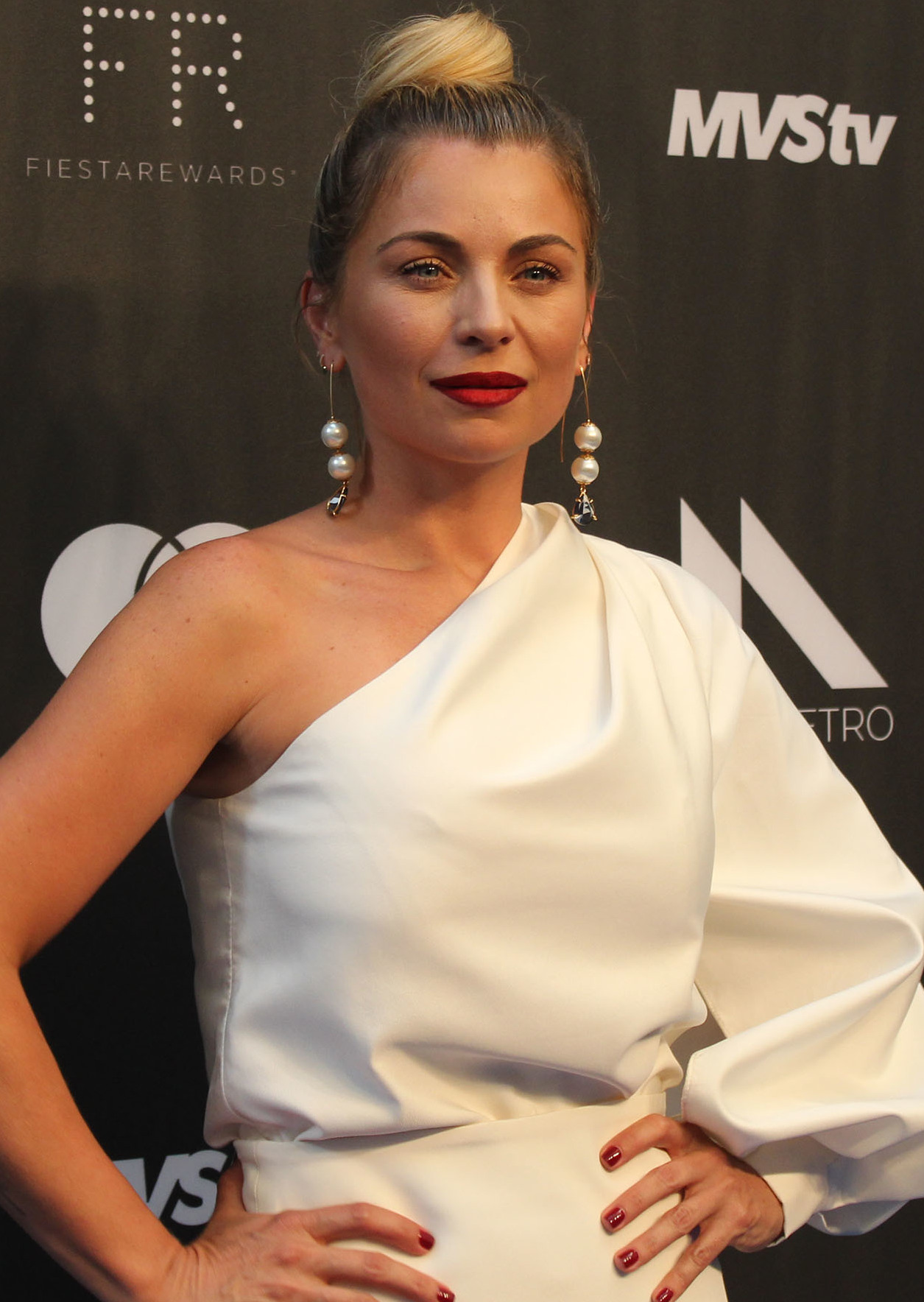
- Paleta at the 2019 Metropolitan Theatre Awards
- Born: 29 November 1978 (age 47); Kraków, Poland
- Citizenship: Poland; Mexico
- Occupation: Actress
- Years active: 1989–present
- Spouses: Plutarco Haza (m. 1998; div. 2008) Emiliano Salinas (m. 2013)
- Partner: Alberto Guerra (2008–2010)
- Children: 3
- Father: Zbigniew Paleta
- Family: Dominika Paleta (sister)

Maria Ludwika Paleta Paciorek (Spanish: [luðˈβika paˈleta]; born 29 November 1978) is a Polish-Mexican actress.

== Early life and career ==
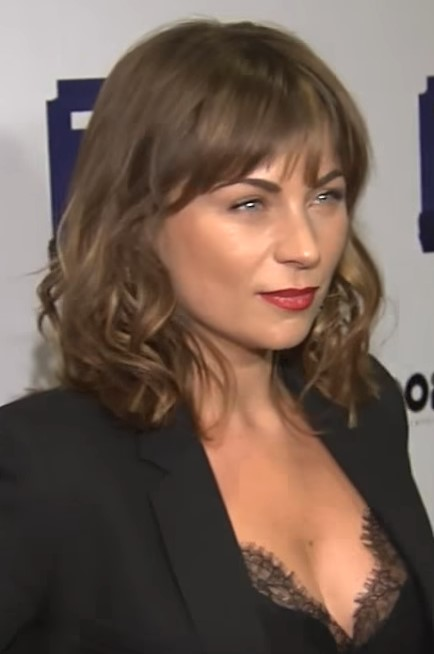
Paleta in 2017

Paleta was born in Kraków in 1978. When her father, musician Zbigniew Paleta, was offered a job in Mexico, the Paleta family settled permanently. As a child, Ludwika was taken by her sister Dominika Paleta, to an acting audition on a whim. Ludwika impressed the casting directors so much that soon after, she was offered her first television role in Carrusel (1989). Paleta became an instant celebrity with her character. Three years later, in 1992, she returned to the small screen in what she calls her favorite television job yet, El abuelo y yo opposite Gael García Bernal. Roles in Huracán, Amigas y Rivales, and Mujer de Madera soon followed. Her most recent work in television was in the Endemol-Telefe produced Los Exitosos Perez.

Paleta has obtained great fame and popularity in the Latin American country that has been her home since she was merely a child. In an interview, Ludwika Paleta declared that she loves both Mexico and Poland, but that she does not see herself living outside Mexico in the near future.

She is fluent in Spanish, Polish and English. In 1998 Paleta married Mexican actor, Plutarco Haza. Their son, Nicolás, was born on 11 November 1999. They divorced in 2008. On 20 April 2013, near Mérida, she married Emiliano Salinas Occelli, son of former Mexican president Carlos Salinas de Gortari and former Mexican first lady Cecilia Occelli.

She joined actor Aarón Díaz as spokespeople for Calvin Klein in Mexico. In 2012, she starred as Estefania Bouvier de Castañón in Abismo de pasion in a special appearance.

In 2026, she starred in the romantic comedy ¿Quieres ser mi novia?.

== Filmography ==
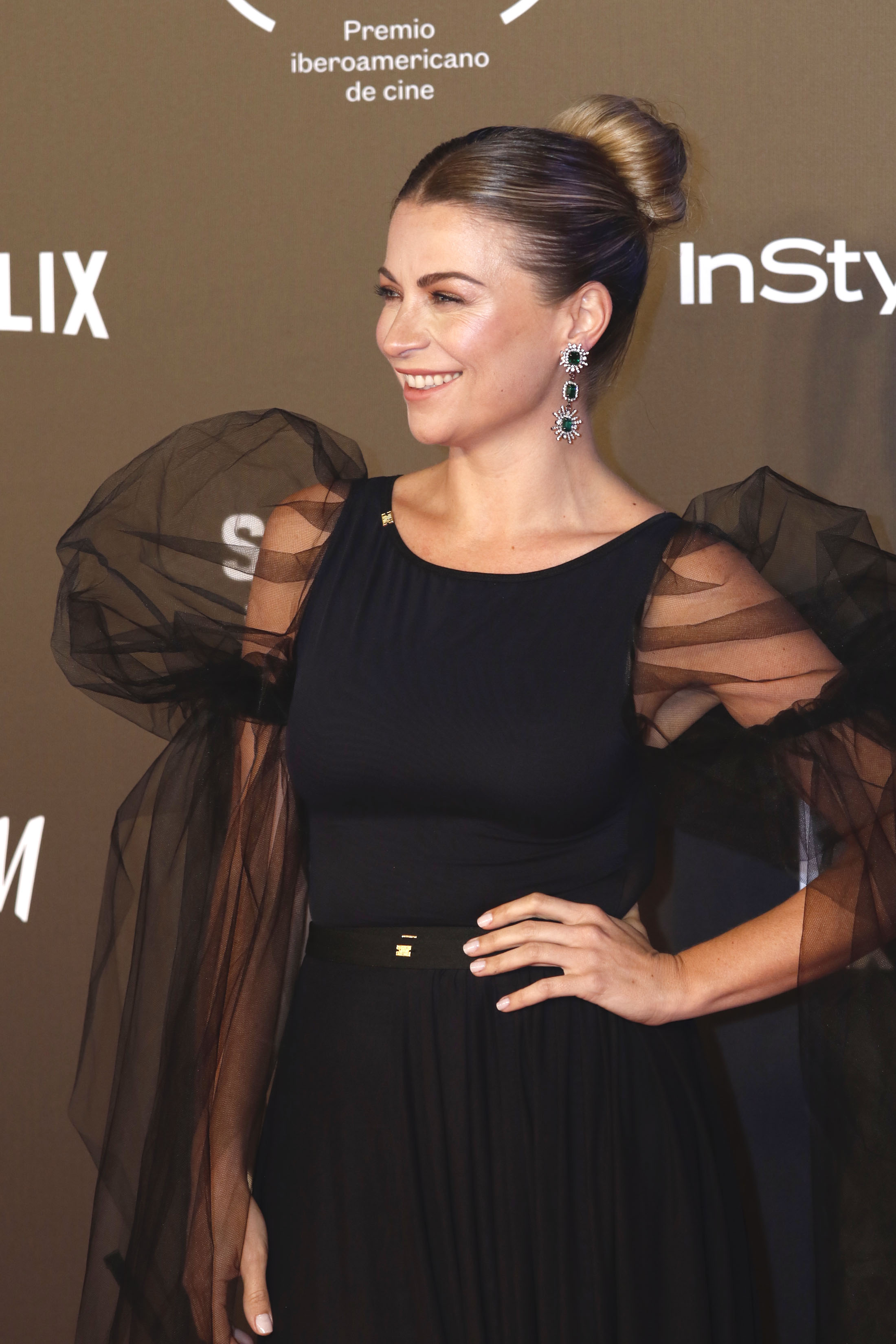
Premios Fénix 2017

=== Films ===
| Year | Title | Role | Notes |
|---|---|---|---|
| 2003 | Como Dios manda | Rita | Short film |
| 2003 | Seis días en la oscuridad | Ximena Lagaspi | |
| 2003 | Corazón de melón | Fernanda Montenegro | |
| 2007 | Polvo de ángel | Bella | |
| 2007 | Propiedad ajena | Miranda Sámano | |
| 2009 | El libro de piedra | Mariana | |
| 2013 | No sé si cortarme las venas o dejármelas largas | Nora | Associate producer |
| 2013 | Allá y en Tonces | Marina | |
| 2014 | Volando bajo | Toribia Venegas | |
| 2016 | Rumbos paralelos | Gabriela "Gaby" Mendoza | Nominated - Ariel Award for Best Actress |
| 2016 | Un Cuento de Circo & A Love Song | Aura | |
| 2023 | ¿Quieres ser mi hijo? | Lucía | |
| 2023 | Todo el silencio | Lola | Ariel Award for Best Supporting Actress |
| 2024 | Noche de bodas | Lucía | |
| 2026 | ¿Quieres ser mi novia? | Lucía | |
| 2026 | Deseo | Lucero | regia Teresa Simone |

=== Television ===
| Year | Title | Role | Notes |
|---|---|---|---|
| 1989-90 | Carrusel | María Joaquina Villaseñor | Television Debut |
| 1992 | El abuelo y yo | Alejandra | |
| 1995-96 | María la del Barrio | María de los Ángeles "Tita" de la Vega Hernández | |
| 1997-98 | Huracán | Norma | |
| 2001 | Amigas y rivales | Jimena de la O | |
| 2003 | Niña amada mía | Carolina Soriano | |
| 2004-05 | Mujer de madera | Aída Santibáñez Villalpando | |
| 2006 | Duelo de pasiones | Alina Montellano | |
| 2007–08 | Palabra de mujer | Paulina Álvarez y Junco | |
| 2012 | Abismo de pasión | Doña Estefanía Bouvier de Castañón | 7 episodes |
| 2016–2017 | La querida del Centauro | Yolanda Acosta | |
| 2018 | Rubirosa | Zsa Zsa Gabor | |
| 2021 | Madre sólo hay dos | Ana | |

== Awards and nominations ==
=== Premios TVyNovelas ===
| Year | Category | Telenovela | Result |
|---|---|---|---|
| 1990 | Best Child Performance | Carrusel | Won |
| 1992 | Best Child Performance | El abuelo y yo | Won |
| 1996 | Best Young Lead Actress | María la del barrio | Won |

=== MTV Movie Awards México ===
| Year | Category | Telenovela | Result |
|---|---|---|---|
| 2004 | Favorite Actress | Corazón de melón | Nominated |

=== Premios Bravo ===
| Year | Category | Telenovela | Result |
|---|---|---|---|
| 2013 | Girl Revelation | No sé si cortarme las venas o dejármelas largas | Won |

=== Diosas de Plata ===
| Year | Category | Telenovela | Result |
|---|---|---|---|
| 2014 | Favorite Lead Actress | No sé si cortarme las venas o dejármelas largas | Won |

=== Premios Tu Mundo ===
| Year | Category | Telenovela | Result |
|---|---|---|---|
| 2016 | Favorite Lead Actress:Series | La querida del Centauro | Nominated |
| 2016 | The Best Actor with Bad Luck | La querida del Centauro | Nominated |
| 2016 | The Perfect Couple:Series (with Michel Brown) | La querida del Centauro | Nominated |
