= Mario Ruiz Massieu =

Mexican lawyer (1950–1999)

Mario Ruiz Massieu (December 24, 1950 – September 15, 1999) was a Mexican ambassador and key figure in Mexican politics in 1994, the last year of the presidency of Carlos Salinas de Gortari.

== Early life and family ==
Ruiz Massieu was born December 24, 1950, in Acapulco, Guerrero. Two of his brothers, Wilfrido and Roberto, were shot dead at a young age in January 1965 in Acapulco. Another one of his brothers, José Francisco Ruiz Massieu, went on to become governor of Guerrero and a powerful figure in the Institutional Revolutionary Party (PRI).

== Career and entry into government ==
Mario initially maintained a lower profile. He served as secretary general of the National Autonomous University of Mexico (UNAM), Mexico's leading public university, and later as undersecretary of the Interior and ambassador to Denmark before being appointed deputy attorney general in the administration of Carlos Salinas.

A key component of his job was to bring the leaders of the country's powerful drug cartels to justice.

== Corruption ==
In December 1993, he made an initial deposit of $4 million at what was then the Texas Commerce Bank in Houston. Between then and February 1995, another $2.5 million was found, all deposited in cash, in amounts ranging from $98,000 to $800,000.

According to U.S. grand jury testimony, his top aide Jorge Stergios transported the money using cardboard boxes and suitcases on Ruiz Massieu's behalf on twenty five commercial flights from Mexico to Houston, Texas over a period of twelve or thirteen months. Stergios is currently in prison.

The U.S. Department of Justice said Mario Ruiz Massieu's $9.9 million came from bribes paid by drug traffickers in exchange for immunity from prosecution. Ruiz Massieu always insisted it was family money, or "bonuses" paid by the Mexican presidency. He had more than $3 million in accounts in Mexico.

Historically, several such deputy attorneys general were similarly corrupt.

== Downfall ==
Ruiz Massieu's regime began to crumble when his brother José Francisco ("Pepe"), who was general secretary of the PRI, was assassinated in broad daylight on September 28, 1994. José Francisco was linked to a highly influential political clan through marriage to Adriana Salinas, sister of Carlos Salinas de Gortari (the marriage ended in divorce). Six months earlier, the party's presidential candidate, Luis Donaldo Colosio, had been shot dead at a campaign rally.

In what appeared to be a clever move, Carlos Salinas appointed Ruiz Massieu to investigate José Francisco's death. Within days, Ruiz Massieu ordered thirteen people to be arrested, including the gunman. It is alleged that Ruiz Massieu's agents badly tortured nearly all of those arrested, leading to confessions that they were hired by Fernando Rodríguez González, a PRI bureaucrat who was also arrested. Fernando claimed that the architect of the assassination was Manuel Muñoz Rocha, who was never apprehended. Less than two months after the murder, Ruiz Massieu resigned, claiming that high-ranking party members were blocking the investigation. Ruiz-Massieu claimed he had proof of PRI party president Ignacio Pichardo Pagaza and party secretary María de los Ángeles Moreno hiding evidence and thus blocking the investigation. Pichardo Pagaza and Moreno requested for proof to be shown, but it was never found. In a famous press conference on November 23, 1994, he announced the following:

El pasado 28 de septiembre una bala mató a dos Ruiz Massieu. A uno le quitó la vida, al otro le quitó la fe y la esperanza de que en un gobierno priísta se llegue a la justicia. Los demonios andan sueltos, y han triunfado.

On September 28, a bullet killed two Ruiz Massieus. One's life was taken, and from the other was taken his faith and hope that justice would be achieved under a PRI government. The demons are on the loose, and they have triumphed.

— Mario Ruiz Massieu

For a brief period, Mario Ruiz Massieu was able to present himself as the avenging angel. He authored a political column in a newspaper and a book, entitled Yo Accuso ("I accuse").

In December 1994, with the inauguration of President Ernesto Zedillo the following month and the appointment of new authorities, the net began to close. In February 1995, news arrived that the police had arrested the mastermind behind José Francisco's assassination—none other than Raúl Salinas de Gortari, brother of former President Carlos Salinas de Gortari.

Accused of protecting his own brother's killer, Ruiz Massieu fled the country. However, when he switched flights, he was unable to declare the $46,000 he was carrying, allowing U.S. authorities to arrest him in Newark, New Jersey. Only the incompetence of Attorney General Antonio Lozano Gracia and the suspicions of the U.S. judge hearing the case regarding the methods of the Mexican police allowed him to evade four successive extradition requests from the Attorney General's Office.

However, U.S. authorities also began to move against him, seeking to confiscate his money deposited in Texas as proceeds of drug trafficking, and prosecuted him in a Houston court as a money launderer, a charge for which he could have faced 20 years in prison upon conviction.

=== US immigration law issues ===
Ruiz Massieu entered the United States in 1995 amid allegations of corruption and involvement in a political scandal tied to the assassination of his brother, José Francisco Ruiz Massieu, a prominent Mexican politician. On March 3, 1995, he was arrested by US authorities in Newark, New Jersey, on US criminal charges related to a false customs declaration as he was attempting to leave the country. Then Mexico charged him with corruption and organized crime. The US government attempted to extradite him to Mexico. The US courts dismissed the extradition request on the grounds of no probable cause, citing the involvement of torture in the prosecutor's case.

The Immigration and Naturalization Service (INS) immediately initiated deportation proceedings against him under Section 241(a)(4)(C)(i) of the INA, a provision that the government had rarely used before. This provision states that:"[a]n alien whose presence or activities in the United States the Secretary of State has reasonable grounds to believe would have potentially serious adverse foreign policy consequences for the United States is deportable." The INS based their order to deport on a letter signed by Secretary of State Warren Christopher that stated Ruiz Massieu's continued presence in the US would harm the country's efforts to reform the Mexican justice system.

In January 1996, while waiting for his deportation proceeding, Ruiz-Massieu filed a suit in the US District Court for the District of New Jersey seeking to prevent his deportation. District court judge Maryanne Trump Barry granted Ruiz-Massieu's request for an injunction, ordered his release, and declared section 241(a)(4)(C)(i) to be unconstitutionally vague, "Kafkaesque", that the provision violates due process, and "lacks 'sufficiently intelligible standards to direct the Secretary's exercise of discretion and to enable the court to review the exercise thereof.'" The government filed an appeal in the Court of Appeals for the Third Circuit, which granted the appeal on the grounds that the defendant is required to exhaust his administrative remedies under the INA before filing suit with the judicial branch.

==== Matter of Ruiz-Massieu ====
He was charged under Section 241(a)(4)(C)(i) of the Immigration and Nationality Act of 1952 (INA), which gave the Secretary of State the power to deport any alien if the Secretary has reason to believe that the alien's presence could seriously damage the foreign policy of the United States. The ruling gave the Secretary a broad power to determine what counts as a threat to foreign policy. This provision of law has been rarely used. Ruiz-Massieu took his case to an administrative immigration judge, who found Ruiz-Massieu not deportable under section 241(a)(4)(C)(i) and the government appealed to the BIA. On June 10, 1999, the U.S. Department of Justice, Executive Office for Immigration Review, Board of Immigration Appeals, issued a decision In re Ruiz-Massieu granting the government's appeal and upholding the deportation order.

The Board wrote that in order for the person to be deported under Section 241(a)(4)(C)(i), the INS bears the burden of proving that the Secretary of State has made "a facially reasonable and bona fide determination that an alien’s presence or activities in the United States would have potentially serious adverse foreign policy consequences for the United States." A letter from the Secretary of State is presumed to establish deportability if it conveys such a determination. The INS was not required to present additional evidence beyond the letter to meet its burden of proof.

BIA held that Secretary of State Warren Christopher had made such a determination regarding Ruiz Massieu and the deportation order was upheld. Before the deportation could be effected, and before it could be further contested in court, Ruiz Massieu committed suicide. The case was dismissed, as there was no longer a living defendant to prosecute or deport.

The Board said they were not authorized to rule on the constitutionality of the provision because BIA is part of the Executive branch.

The Matter of Ruiz-Massieu established that, in matters before BIA, the INS does not need to give independent evidence to corroborate the Secretary’s determination, provided the stated reasons appear reasonable and genuine on their face. The Board held that Congress had delegated the authority to make that determination to the Department of State. Since BIA is part of the Department of Justice, they are not empowered to scrutinize the Secretary's determination, as long as the justification given is not obviously unreasonable.

As an administrative body within the executive branch, BIA lacks the power to rule on a law's constitutionality. Before he filed a case with the BIA, Ruiz Massieu had already challenged his deportation in US district court. District Judge Maryanne Trump Barry, the sister of Donald Trump, declared the law unconstitutional. A circuit court overturned the decision on procedural grounds without addressing the constitutional question, which remains unresolved.

In discussing the deference afforded to the Secretary of State, the Board noted that "there is no evidence suggesting that Congress intended for an Immigration Judge, or even the Attorney General, to override the Secretary of State on matters of foreign policy." As a result, the Board concluded that the respondent, who was denied the opportunity to cross-examine the Secretary of State about the basis for the decision, did not suffer any prejudice.

Three months after the BIA’s decision, with his case pending an appeal, and new criminal charges filed against him Ruiz-Massieu died in an apparent suicide. The courts never had the occasion to make another ruling about this case. His deportation had not yet been executed.

The Third Circuit left untouched Judge Barry's opinion that section 241(a)(4)(C)(i) is unconstitutional. As a lower court decision, it is not considered binding on other courts. The federal appeals courts have still not ruled on this question and they are in a place where they can still hear a challenge to the constitutionality of this law. However, the court system has consistently held that the executive branch enjoys a strong plenary power over the exclusion and removal of aliens.

The circuit court wrote that, in cases involving the "deportation of aliens solely on the grounds of beliefs, statements, or associations which would be lawful if performed within the United States ... the alien may not be excluded or deported unless the Secretary personally determines that the alien’s admission or presence would compromise a compelling United States foreign policy interest."

In 2025, Secretary of State Marco Rubio used the same provision to initiate a deportation process against Mahmoud Khalil, a Palestinian student at Columbia University. Khalil had led student political protests critical of the Israeli military campaign, which Rubio said threatened US foreign policy concerning antisemitism. The matter is still pending a review. According to legal expert Bill Hing, the government must show "clear and convincing evidence" of a "massive" problem for national security caused by the respondent's presence in the US in order for the deportation to prevail.

== Death ==
Mario Ruiz Massieu was kept under house arrest for the last three and a half years of his life in New Jersey. Two days before his trial for money laundering, on September 15, 1999, he died of an antidepressant overdose, leaving behind two suicide notes: a private letter to his family and an open letter made public by his lawyers. In the latter, he continued to proclaim his innocence and accused former President Ernesto Zedillo of having "a good deal to do" with his brother's death.

Upon his death, Mario Ruiz Massieu left behind his wife, María Barrientos, and a 10-year-old daughter, Regina.

The official narrative notes that he took his life on the eve of Mexican Independence Day.

== See also ==
- 1995 Zapatista Crisis
- Corruption in Mexico
- Law enforcement in Mexico
- U.S.-Mexico relations
- Federal government of the United States

== Selection of published works ==
- Derecho Agrario Revolucionario, bases para su estudio (UNAM, 1984)
- El Cambio en la Universidad, (UNAM, 1987)
- La Universidad Detenida, (El Nacional, 1990)
- Manual de Procedimientos Agrarios, (Librería Porrúa, 1990)
- La Modernización del Marco Jurídico para el Combate al Narcotráfico en México, (Fondo de Cultura Económica, 1994)
