= Mario Ruiz =

Mario Ruiz may refer to:

- Mario Ruiz Armengol (1914–2002), Mexican pianist, composer and conductor
- Mario Ruiz Massieu (1950–1999), Mexican lawyer and ambassador
- Mario Ruíz (Mario Alejandro Ruíz Díaz, born 1977), Mexican footballer
- Mario Ruiz (actor), Colombian actor, appeared in the series Tres Caínes
