= Castañón =

Castañón is a surname of Asturian origin.

== People with the name ==
- Antonio Castañón, Mexican businessman
- Jesús Castañón (born 1973), Mexican jockey
- José Manuel Castañón (1920–2001), Spanish writer
- Joseph Castanon (born 1997), American actor and singer-songwriter
- Sofía Castañón (born 1983), Spanish poet and politician
