= Raúl Salinas Lozano =

Mexican politician

Senator for Nuevo León
- In office 1 September 1982 – 31 August 1988
- Preceded by: Adrián Yáñez Martínez
- Succeeded by: Ricardo Canavati Tafich

Secretary of Industry and Commerce
- In office 1 December 1958 – 30 November 1964
- President: Adolfo López Mateos
- Preceded by: Gilberto Loyo González (as Secretary of Economy)
- Succeeded by: Octaviano Campos Salas

Personal details
- Born: 1 May 1917 Agualeguas, Nuevo León, Mexico
- Died: 23 February 2004 (aged 86) Mexico City, Mexico
- Party: Institutional Revolutionary

Raúl Salinas Lozano (born Agualeguas, Nuevo León; 1 May 1917 – 23 February 2004) was a Mexican economist. He was a former Secretary of Agriculture, Mexican Ambassador to the Soviet Union and father of former president Carlos Salinas de Gortari of the Institutional Revolutionary Party (PRI). He served as economics minister under José López Portillo.

Salinas studied economics at both the National Autonomous University of Mexico and Harvard University, where he earned as master's degree. He returned to Mexico and taught at universities and served in a series of government positions.

Salinas was married to Margarita de Gortari Carvajal, with whom he had five children. Salinas's older son, Raúl Salinas de Gortari, was convicted of the murder of his sister Adriana's husband José Francisco Ruiz Massieu in 1999, although the sentence was overturned in June 2005. Salinas died of pneumonia at age 86.
