= Francisco Javier Gil Ortiz =

Mexican politician

- Born: 29 May 1963 (age 62); Tamaulipas, Mexico
- Occupation: Politician
- Political party: PRI

Francisco Javier Martín Gil Ortiz (born 29 May 1963) is a Mexican politician from the Institutional Revolutionary Party (PRI).

From 2007 to 2009 he was the municipal president of Altamira, Tamaulipas, and, in the 2009 mid-terms, he was elected to the Chamber of Deputies to represent Tamaulipas's 7th district during the 61st session of Congress.
