= Cecilia Occelli =

Mexican activist (born 1950)

First Lady of Mexico
- In office December 1, 1988 – November 30, 1994
- President: Carlos Salinas de Gortari
- Preceded by: Paloma Cordero
- Succeeded by: Nilda Patricia Velasco

Chairwoman of the National System for Integral Family Development
- In office December 1, 1988 – November 30, 1994

Personal details
- Born: María Cecilia Yolanda Occelli González; 1950 (age 75–76) Mexico City, Mexico
- Party: Institutional Revolutionary Party
- Spouse: Carlos Salinas de Gortari (m. 1972; div. 1995)
- Children: Cecilia Salinas Occelli; Emiliano Salinas; Juan Cristóbal Salinas Ocelli

María Cecilia Yolanda Occelli González, known by Cecilia Occelli, (born 1950) is a Mexican social advocate who served as the First Lady of Mexico from 1988 to 1994. She is the ex-wife of former Mexican President, Carlos Salinas de Gortari.

== Biography ==
Occelli was born in 1950 in Mexico City as one of nine children. Her father, Armando Occelli, was an engineer, while her mother, Ana Maria González, raised the children. Occelli attended primary school at the Instituto Guadalupe and secondary school at the Instituto Félix de Jesús Rougier, a school run by the Sisters of the Holy Spirit and Mary Immaculate. Occelli then pursued an early career as a bilingual executive secretary.

She first met Carlos Salinas de Gortari in 1958 when both were respectively aged ten as well as eight at a party for the National Association of Charros, where both of Occelli's brothers were members. They were introduced to each other by his sister, Adriana Salinas. However, they did not begin dating until 1965, when she was 15-years old and he was 17, when both met at another charro party. The relationship ended in 1968 when Carlos Salinas moved to the United States to study economics.

In 1970, Occelli and Salinas reconnected when both were in Williamsburg, Virginia. Salinas soon asked Occelli to marry him. The couple wed on April 15, 1972, at the Barrio de las Aguilas church in Mexico City. They moved to Boston, where Salinas began his master's degree program at Harvard University. Occelli became pregnant with their first child during his first semester at Harvard. Their oldest daughter, Cecilia, was born on January 22, 1974. Their second child, Emiliano, was born on February 19, 1976, while their youngest son, Juan Cristóbal, was born in 1978.

Cecilia Occelli served as First Lady of Mexico from 1988 to 1994 during her husband's presidency. She focused on issues facing children, young people and the elderly. She promoted related civic programs and projects, notably the creation of the Papalote Museo del Niño, a children's museum in Chapultepec which opened in 1993. Occelli also simultaneously served as the President of the National System for Integral Family Development (DIF) from 1988 to 1994.

President Salinas left office in 1994 at the end of his single term. He traveled to New York City in December 1994 soon after leaving office. When he returned to Mexico in 1995, he surprised Occelli by immediately announcing that he wanted to divorce her. The divorce was finalized later in 1995, abruptly ending their 23-year marriage. Shortly after his divorce from Occelli, Salinas married his second wife, Ana Paula Gerard Rivero, whom he is believed to have met in 1983. Gerard Rivero had worked as a technical secretary for the Economic Cabinet during the Salinas administration.

During the 2000s, Occelli became President of the Fundación de Apoyo Infantil A.C., which works in conjunction with Save the Children. Occelli also continued to serve on the board of trustees for the Papalote Museo del Niño, which she helped to establish.

In 2010, author Rosa María Valles Ruiz released a biography of Occelli entitled "El encanto de la discreción" ("The Charm of Discretion") with Occelli's help. Occelli appeared with Valles Ruiz at the book's release party, which was held at the Papalote Museo del Niño in March 2010. In the book, which recounts her life, Occelli expressed pride in the work accomplished by her former husband, Carlos Salinas de Gortari, and said that she was "proud for having shared 20 years of my life with him."
