= Gonzalo Alemán Migliolo =

Mexican politician

- Born: 10 May 1954 (age 72); Aldama Municipality, Tamaulipas, Mexico
- Education: Autonomous University of Tamaulipas
- Occupation: Politician
- Political party: PRI

Gonzalo Alemán Migliolo (born 10 May 1954) is a Mexican politician affiliated with the Institutional Revolutionary Party (PRI).

He was the municipal president of Aldama, Tamaulipas, from 1978 to 1980, and, in the 2003 mid-terms, he was elected to the Chamber of Deputies to represent Tamaulipas's 7th district during the 59th session of Congress.
