= 7th federal electoral district of Tamaulipas =

Federal electoral district of Mexico

Tamaulipas's 7th
- Electoral district of the Chamber of Deputies of Mexico

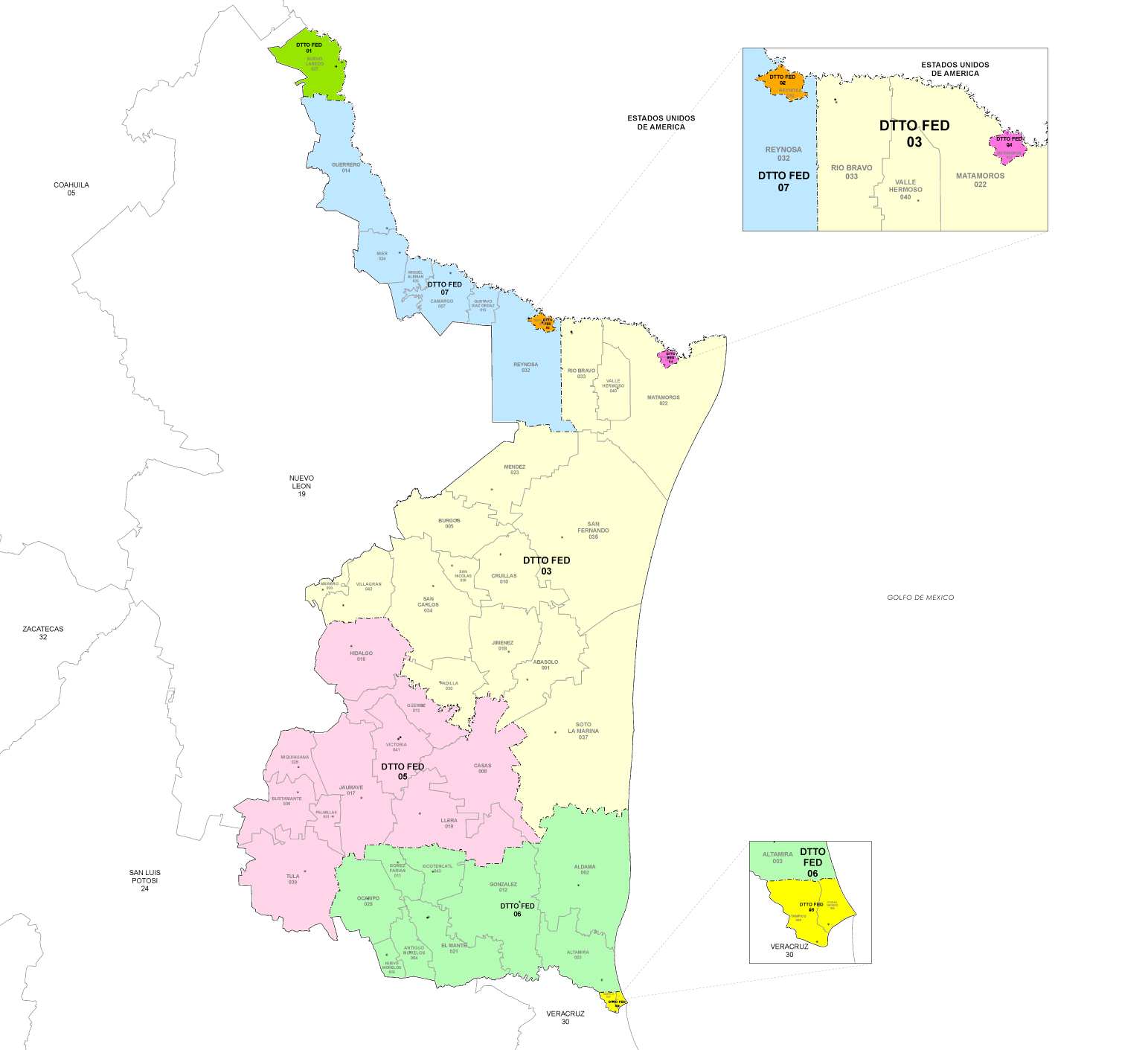
- 7th district since 2023

Incumbent
- Member: Olga Juliana Elizondo
- Party: ▌Labour Party
- Congress: 66th (2024–2027)

District
- State: Tamaulipas
- Head town: Reynosa
- Coordinates: 26°05′N 98°17′W
- Covers: Reynosa (part), Camargo, Guerrero, Gustavo Díaz Ordaz, Mier, Miguel Alemán
- PR region: Second
- Precincts: 219
- Population: 383,847 (2020 census)

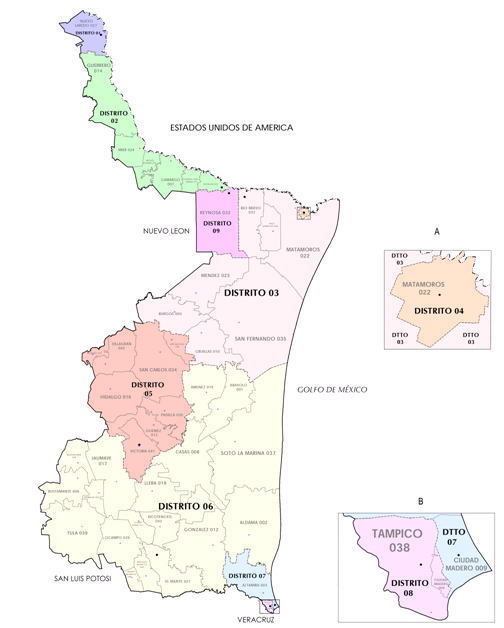
Tamaulipas's districts in 2017–2022

The 7th federal electoral district of Tamaulipas (Spanish: Distrito electoral federal 07 de Tamaulipas) is one of the 300 electoral districts into which Mexico is divided for elections to the federal Chamber of Deputies and one of eight such districts in the state of Tamaulipas.

It elects one deputy to the lower house of Congress for each three-year legislative session by means of the first-past-the-post system. Votes cast in the district also count towards the calculation of proportional representation ("plurinominal") deputies elected from the second region.

The 7th district was created as part of the 1977 electoral reforms, which increased the state's seat allocation from six to nine. The three new districts returned their first deputies in the 1979 mid-term election.

The current member for the district, elected in the 2024 general election, is Olga Juliana Elizondo Guerra of the Labour Party (PT).

== District territory ==
Tamaulipas lost a district in the 2023 districting plan adopted by the National Electoral Institute (INE), which is to be used for the 2024, 2027 and 2030 federal elections. The reconfigured 7th district is in the north of the state and comprises 219 electoral precincts (secciones electorales) across six of the state's 43 municipalities:

- The southern portion of the municipality of Reynosa excluded from the 2nd district, plus the whole of Camargo, Guerrero, Gustavo Díaz Ordaz, Mier and Miguel Alemán.

The head town (cabecera distrital), where results from individual polling stations are gathered together and tallied, is the city of Reynosa. The district reported a population of 383,847 in the 2020 census.

== Previous districting schemes ==
Evolution of electoral district numbers
	1974	1978	1996	2005	2017	2023
Tamaulipas	6	9	8	8	9	8
Chamber of Deputies	196	300				

2017–2022

Between 2017 and 2022, Tamaulipas accounted for nine single-member congressional seats. Under the 2017 plan, the 7th district was in the south-east of the state. Its head town was at Ciudad Madero and it covered a portion of Ciudad Madero (65 precincts, with the remainder assigned to the 8th district) and the whole of Altamira.

2005–2017

Under the 2005 plan, Tamaulipas had eight districts. This district's head town was at Ciudad Madero and it covered the eastern part of that municipality, plus the municipalities of Altamira and Aldama.

1996–2005

In the 1996 scheme, under which Tamaulipas lost a single-member seat, the district had its head town at Ciudad Madero and it covered the municipalities of Aldama, Altamira and Ciudad Madero.

1978–1996

The districting scheme in force from 1978 to 1996 was the result of the 1977 electoral reforms, which increased the number of single-member seats in the Chamber of Deputies from 196 to 300. Under that plan, Tamaulipas's seat allocation rose from six to nine. The new 7th district's head town was at Río Bravo and it covered Río Bravo, Valle Hermoso and a portion of Reynosa.

== Deputies returned to Congress ==
(Mexico) National parties
- Current
- PAN
- PRI
- PT
- PVEM
- MC
- Morena
- PAZ
- Somos
- Defunct or local only
- PLM
- PNR
- PRM
- PNM
- PP
- PPS
- PARM
- PFCRN
- CON
- PANAL
- PSD
- PES
- PES
- PRD

Tamaulipas's 7th district
Election	Deputy	Party	Term	Legislature
1979	Gumercindo Guerrero García	Institutional Revolutionary Party	1979–1982	51st Congress
1982	Mario Santos Gómez	Institutional Revolutionary Party	1982–1985	52nd Congress
1985	Marciano Aguilar Mendoza	Institutional Revolutionary Party	1985–1988	53rd Congress
1988	Bernardino Canchola Herrera	Institutional Revolutionary Party	1988–1991	54th Congress
1991	Manuel Muñoz Rocha	Institutional Revolutionary Party	1991–1994	55th Congress
1994	Óscar Manuel Alexandre López	Institutional Revolutionary Party	1994–1997	56th Congress
1997	Joaquín Antonio Hernández Correa	Party of the Democratic Revolution	1997–2000	57th Congress
2000	Gustavo Adolfo González Balderas	Institutional Revolutionary Party	2000–2003	58th Congress
2003	Gonzalo Alemán Migliolo	Institutional Revolutionary Party	2003–2006	59th Congress
2006	Beatriz Collado Lara	National Action Party (Mexico)	2006–2009	60th Congress
2009	Francisco Javier Martín Gil Ortiz	Institutional Revolutionary Party	2009–2012	61st Congress
2012	Marcelina Orta Coronado	National Action Party (Mexico)	2012–2015	62nd Congress
2015	Esdras Romero Vega	Institutional Revolutionary Party	2015–2018	63rd Congress
2018	Erasmo González Robledo	National Regeneration Movement	2018–2021	64th Congress
2021	Erasmo González Robledo (Note: González Robledo resigned his seat on 29 February 2024 and was replaced for the remainder of his term by his alternate, Marín Rodríguez.); Héctor Jesús Marín Rodríguez	National Regeneration Movement	2021–2024	65th Congress
2024	Olga Juliana Elizondo Guerra	Labour Party (Mexico)	2024–2027	66th Congress

== Presidential elections ==
Tamaulipas's 7th district
Election	District won by	Party or coalition	%
2018	Andrés Manuel López Obrador	Juntos Haremos Historia	54.4821
2024	Claudia Sheinbaum Pardo	Sigamos Haciendo Historia	68.2409
