= Emiliano Salinas =

Mexican businessman (born 1976)

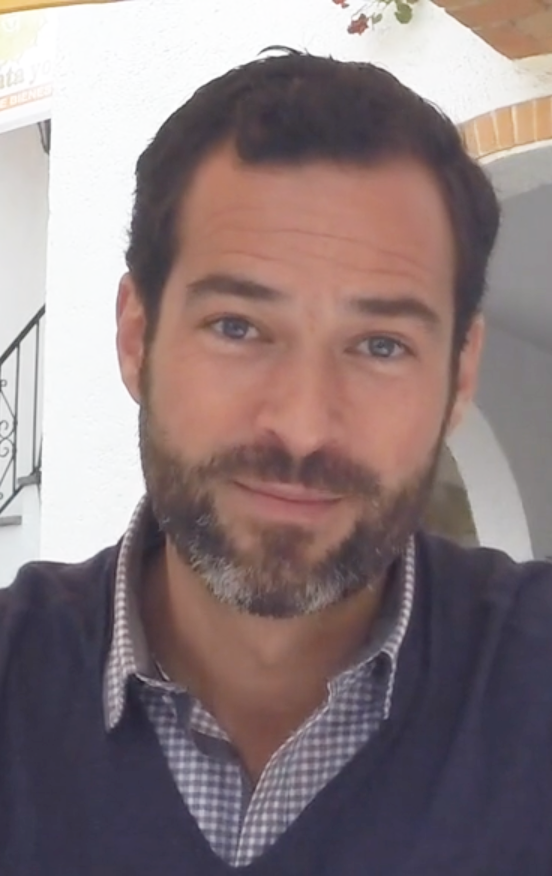
- Salinas in 2014
- Born: Carlos Emiliano Salinas Occelli; February 19, 1976 (age 50); Mexico
- Occupations: Financial analyst, businessman
- Spouse: Ludwika Paleta (m. 2013)
- Parent(s): Carlos Salinas (father); Cecilia Occelli (mother)

Carlos Emiliano Salinas Occelli (born February 19, 1976) is a Mexican venture capitalist and businessman. He is the son of former Mexican president Carlos Salinas de Gortari.

Between 2003 and 2018, Salinas was a member of the American cult NXIVM. He served as vice president of Prorsus Capital, a financial consortium with ties to Keith Raniere and NXIVM. Following Raniere's arrest in 2018 for sex trafficking, money laundering, and other misdeeds, Salinas ended a two-decade association with Raniere and resigned from Prorsus.

== Education and career ==
Salinas is the son of Carlos Salinas de Gortari and his first wife, former Mexican First Lady Cecilia Occelli. Educated in Mexico, Switzerland, France and the United States, he is fluent in Spanish, English and French. He studied in the primary school division of the Liceo Mexicano Japonés in Mexico City.

Before working at Prorsus Capital, Salinas received his bachelor's degree in economics from ITAM (the Spanish acronym for Autonomous Technology Institute of Mexico) in Mexico. Later, he received his PhD in Political Economy and Government from Harvard University.

Prior to receiving his PhD from Harvard, Salinas worked as a financial analyst for the Lazard Freres and Co. LLC investment bank in New York City, where he participated in mergers and acquisitions involving Telefónica de España, Anheuser-Busch InBev, and Revlon among others.

== NXIVM ==
In March 2011, journalist Denisse Maerker in her Punto de Partida TV show asked Salinas if he was interested in pursuing a political career. He said that he would "if I considered that government is the solution to the problems we face today." He said that he is convinced that good citizenship is the solution to social problems instead of the government.

Aside from his professional career, Salinas has arisen as a staunch voice against violence and corruption in Mexico, and he offers that the culture of self-victimization is to blame for the plight of Mexico in 2011. He believed that if Mexicans were proactive through the use of Civil Resistance, they would have the power to overthrow the regional subjugation of the large drug cartels. He described solutions to these problems in his four levels of response against violence:

- Denial and apathy
- Fear
- Courage
- Non-violent action

During the time Sallinas developed his anti-violence and anti-corruption persona, he was involved with NXIVM, a self-help group whose founder, Keith Raniere was indicted in New York City on charges of racketeering conspiracy, identity theft, extortion, forced labor, money laundering, wire fraud and sex trafficking. Various high level members of the group pled guilty to similar charges. NXIVM advertised itself as a multi-level marketing enterprise. In 2003, Salinas described Nxivm's Executive Success Program, or ESP, as offering a training "like a practical M.B.A." Salinas joined NXIVM's executive board in 2009, co-owned various ESP centers, and was associated with various NXIVM-owned companies in Mexico.

Salinas is credited with recruiting elite members of Mexican society to the group, including at least two children of two former Mexican presidents. Salinas' sister, Cecilia Salinas Occelli, was also a member of the group. Among the allegations levied against Salinas was his support for a plan to have critics of Nxivm who traveled to Mexico arrested and put into jail in that country. In the week's following Raniere's 2018 arrest in Mexico and subsequent deportation to the United States, Salinas cut ties with NXIVM and ESP claiming no knowledge of the alleged behavior. Internet rumors suggested Salinas was under pressure from his father, who supposedly was behind the arrest and extradition of Raniere, to distance himself from the group.

== Patronage and publications ==
Salinas has been involved as producer of acclaimed theater productions, such as Sicario. He has also collaborated in literary productions, like the book on addictions by Luis Eugenio Todd. An essay on corruption co-authored by Salinas, entitled "The Organization of Corruption: Political Horizons and Special Interests", won the First Prize in the 2006 Research Competition on Corruption organized by Mexico's Office of the Comptroller (SFP) and National Autonomous University of Mexico.
