= Beatriz Collado Lara =

Mexican politician

- Born: 6 October 1959 (age 66); Tamaulipas, Mexico
- Occupation: Politician
- Political party: PAN

Beatriz Collado Lara (born 6 October 1959) is a Mexican politician from the National Action Party (PAN). In the 2006 general election, she was elected to the Chamber of Deputies to represent Tamaulipas's 7th district during the 60th session of Congress.
