= El abuelo y yo =

Mexican telenovela

- Also known as: Mi abuelito
- Genre: TV series
- Written by: Lorena Salazar; Eduardo Quiroga
- Directed by: Juan Carlos Muñoz
- Starring: Jorge Martinez de Hoyos; Ludwika Paleta; Gael García Bernal; Flor Eduarda Gurrola; Wendy de los Cobos
- Theme music composer: Amparo Rubín
- Opening theme: "Capitanes de la Calle" by Ludwika Paleta
- Country of origin: Mexico
- Original language: Spanish
- No. of episodes: 90

Production
- Executive producer: Pedro Damián

Original release
- Network: Canal de las Estrellas
- Release: January 6 – June 26, 1992

Related
- Vida robada; Carrusel de las Américas; De pocas, pocas pulgas (2003)

El abuelo y yo (English: Grandfather and I), is a Mexican telenovela produced by Pedro Damián for Televisa. It aired between January 6 and June 26, 1992.

Frances Ondiviela, Marcelo Buquet, Ludwika Paleta, Gael García Bernal and Jorge Martinez de Hoyos star as the main protagonists, while Flor Eduarda Gurrola, Wendy de los Cobos and Ivette Proal star as the main antagonists.

== Plot ==
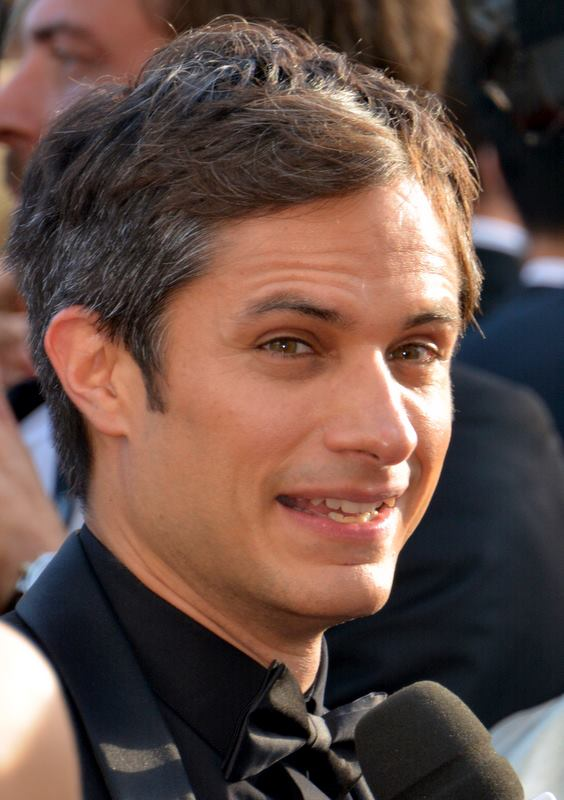
Gael García Bernal is Daniel

Alejandra and Daniel are two kids who live in opposite worlds, but are united by friendship and dreams.

Alejandra is a sweet and tender girl who lives in a world of dreams full of gardens, beautiful dresses, many hats and fairy tales. She is a girl full of fantasies and desires of magical adventures, her parents are wealthy and Alejandra has everything she desires, but that world is far away from Daniel's, a child who has been orphaned, and has made the streets his home since the death of his mother. He is helpless and unknown to his relatives. Daniel only knows that his maternal grandfather never forgave his mother for marrying the wrong man.

Little Daniel, who lives with his dog "Anselmo", first meets don Joaquín, an old musician performer that has now become grumpy and solitary. Daniel believes that the two can be great friends, never imagining that Don Joaquín is actually his grandfather. Daniel then meets Alejandra and together begin to explore new worlds filled with fun, all thanks to don Joaquín who becomes their guide and teaches them the true meaning of friendship and how to remain children. Don Joaquín provides the children with love and affection while also teaching them to use their imagination to travel to strange worlds and to dream things the children have failed to do by solving problems that did not correspond to them.

Ultimately, Daniel and Don Joaquín find they are grandfather and grandson and follow their path together without Alejandra.

== Cast ==
- Frances Ondiviela as Fernanda Irigoyen de Diaz-Uribe
- Marcelo Buquet as Gerardo
- Jorge Martínez de Hoyos as Don Joaquín
- Ludwika Paleta as Alejandra
- Gael García Bernal as Daniel
- Adalberto Martínez as Lucas
- Evangelina Elizondo as Sofía
- Alfonso Iturralde as René
- Raúl Buenfil as Damián
- Beatriz Moreno as Lola
- Ivette Proal as Yolanda
- Héctor del Puerto as Don Lupe
- Wendy de los Cobos as Mayra
- Leo Rojo as Raúl
- Jesús Vargas as Fonseca
- Antonio Brillas as Father José
- Josefina Escobedo as Sra. Lizardi
- Alan Gutiérrez as Rosendo
- Flor Edwarda Gurrola as Yoya
- Julián de Tavira as Emiliano
- Jorge Poza as Perico
- Osvaldo Benavides as Paco
- Eugenio Polgovsky as Eugenio
- Felipe Colombo as Felipín
- Billy Méndez as Billy
- Diego Luna as Luis
- Jorge Salinas as Ernesto
- Eduardo Santamarina as Ulises
- Alejandro Bracho as Joel Chuvila

== Awards and nominations ==
Year	Association	Category	Nominated	Result
1993	TVyNovelas Awards			
1993	TVyNovelas Awards	Best Leading Actress	Evangelina Elizondo	Nominated
1993	TVyNovelas Awards	Best Leading Actor	Jorge Martínez de Hoyos	Won
1993	TVyNovelas Awards	Best Supporting Actor	Adalberto Martínez	Nominated
1993	TVyNovelas Awards	Best Child Performance	Gael García Bernal	Won
1993	TVyNovelas Awards	Best Child Performance	Ludwika Paleta	Won
