= Marcelina Orta Coronado =

Mexican politician (born 1968)

- Born: 11 August 1968 (age 57); Aldama, Tamaulipas, Mexico
- Occupation: Politician
- Political party: PAN

Marcelina Orta Coronado (born 11 August 1968) is a Mexican politician affiliated with the National Action Party (PAN). In the 2012 general election, she was elected to the Chamber of Deputies to represent Tamaulipas's 7th district during the 62nd session of Congress.
