= Gustavo Adolfo González Balderas =

Mexican politician

- Born: 24 June 1959 (age 66); Ciudad Madero, Tamaulipas, Mexico
- Occupation: Politician
- Political party: PRI

Gustavo Adolfo González Balderas (born 24 June 1959) is a Mexican politician from the Institutional Revolutionary Party (PRI). In the 2000 general election, he was elected to the Chamber of Deputies to represent Tamaulipas's 7th district during the 58th session of Congress.
