= Raúl Salinas de Gortari =

Mexican engineer and businessman (born 1946)

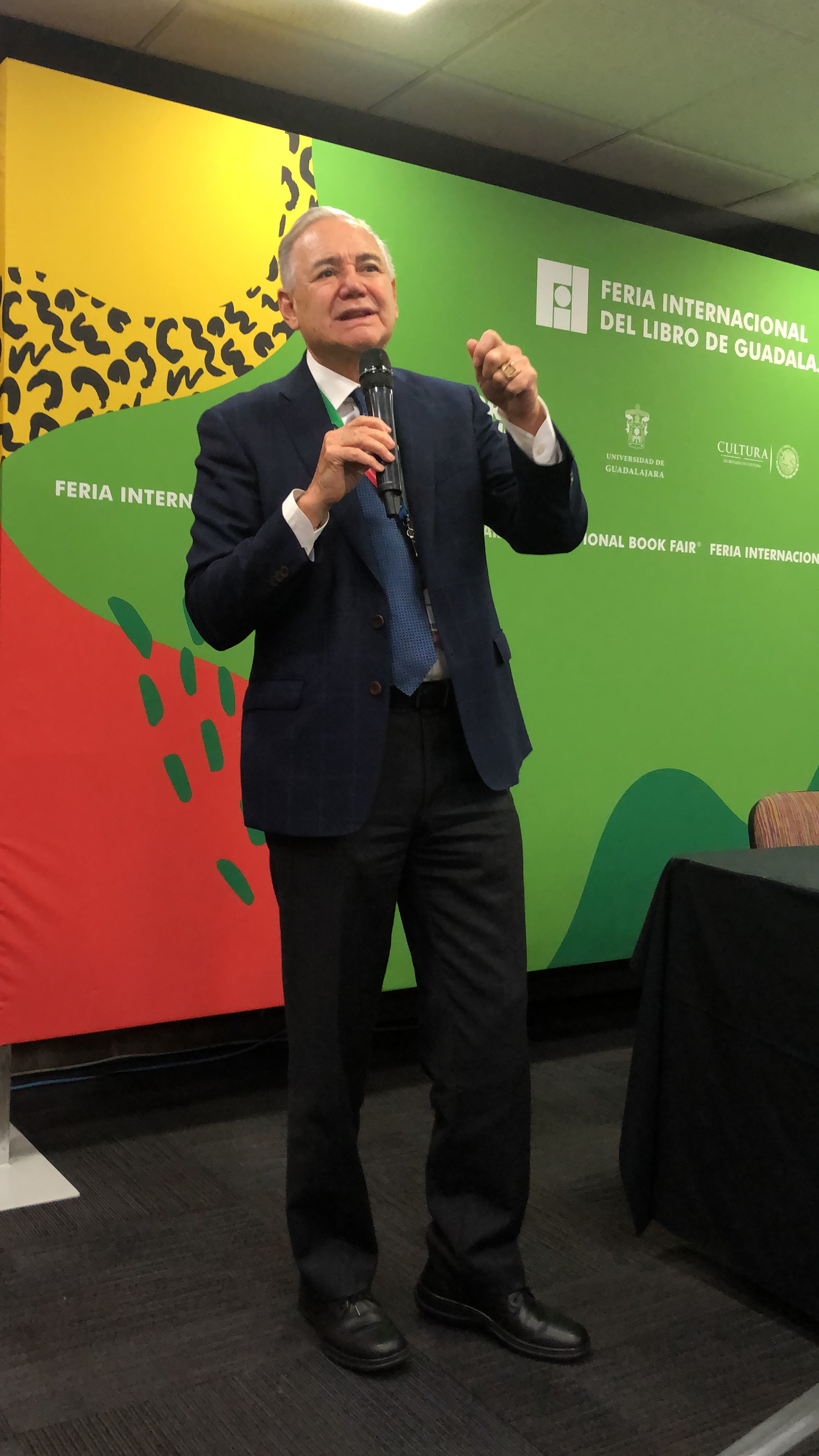
- Born: 24 August 1946 (age 80); Monterrey, Nuevo León
- Education: Universidad Nacional Autónoma de México; École nationale des ponts et chaussées
- Father: Raúl Salinas Lozano
- Family: Carlos Salinas de Gortari (brother)

Raúl Salinas de Gortari (born August 24, 1946) is a Mexican civil engineer and businessman. He is the elder brother of Carlos Salinas de Gortari, the 60th president of Mexico.

== Education ==
Raúl Salinas de Gortari graduated from the Faculty of Engineering of the National Autonomous University of Mexico, as a civil engineer. He has a master's degree in Transportation Planning from the École Nationale Des Ponts Et Chaussees in Paris, and another one in Evaluation of Industrial Development Projects from the Université de Paris.

== Early life ==
Raúl Salinas was the eldest son and one of five children of economist and government official Raúl Salinas Lozano and Margarita de Gortari de Salinas. Salinas's father served as President Adolfo López Mateos's minister of industry and commerce, but was passed over as the PRI's presidential candidate in favor of Gustavo Díaz Ordaz.

On 18 December 1951, when he was five years old, he was playing with his younger brother Carlos, then three, and an eight-year-old friend when they found a loaded rifle, and one of them shot and killed the Salinas family's twelve-year-old maid, Manuela. It was never determined which of the three boys pulled the trigger, and the incident was declared an accident; it was given newspaper coverage in Excelsior and La Prensa at the time. A judge blamed the Salinas parents for leaving a loaded weapon accessible to their small children.

== Career ==
Raúl Salinas de Gortari held various positions of the National Company of Popular Subsistence (Conasupo). He served as General Manager of Sistema de Distribuidoras Conasupo, S.A. de C.V. (Diconsa) and Director of Budget Planning and Programming of Conasupo. He worked 10 years as a Deputy General Director of Grupo IUSA, a Mexican high engineering company founded in 1938, since August 2019 he is an Advisor to the Group Presidency.

From 1970 to 1978 he was professor of Investigation And Learning Methods, Project Evaluation and Planning at the Faculty of Engineering of the National Autonomous University of Mexico. From 1992 to 1993 was visiting Investigator in the Mexico - United States Study Center of the University of California.

He is a member of the College of Civil Engineers of Mexico, where he was Director of Planning Studies at the XVI Directing Council and General Director of Profession Analysis. Since 1982 he is a permanent member of the Mexican Academy of Engineering.

== Books ==
Raul Salinas has published:

- Evaluación de proyectos y selección de tecnología en los países subdesarrollados.
- La Ingeniería para la Infraestructura del Medio Rural.
- Tecnología, empleo y construcción en el desarrollo de México.
- Por la Soberanía Alimentaria: Enfoques y Perspectivas.
- Agrarismo y agricultura en el México Independiente y Postrevolucionario.
- DICONSA en la modernización comercial y la regulación del abasto popular.
- Rural Reform in Mexico: The View From The Comarca Lagunera In 1993.
- Telecomunicaciones en México ante el reto de la Integración.
- Todo lo que el Juez ignoró para sentenciarme.
- El amante. Dos Ventanas a la vida.
- El Secreto, un día.
- Guillén de Lampart, un reclamo de justicia.

In 2016 he published his book "Empoderamiento Ciudadano a través de la Tecnología" which was presented at the Guadalajara Book Fair

== Sport activities ==
He was a member of the Mexican Equestrian Team at the 1971 Pan American Games, held in Cali, Colombia. In 1972 he was National Jumping Champion of the Mexican Equestrian Federation, member of the International Equestrian Federation.

== Espionage ==
He was a victim of espionage by the Dirección Federal de Seguridad, a Mexican intelligence agency, where his personal life was compromised. The Mexican government acknowledged this in 2020.

== Legal issues ==
In February 1995, Raúl Salinas was arrested by order of former President Ernesto Zedillo, admitted in his own statements. He was charged with the murder of his former brother-in-law, José Francisco Ruiz Massieu, who had been married to his sister Adriana. In June 2005, Salinas had his conviction overturned by a judicial panel and he was released from prison.

He had served more than 10 years of a 27.5-year sentence for the 1994 shooting of Ruiz Massieu, a political rival and leading official in Mexico's long-ruling Institutional Revolutionary Party.

== Alleged money laundering ==
In November 1995, Raúl Salinas's wife, Paulina Castañón, and his brother-in-law, Antonio Castañón, were arrested in Geneva, Switzerland after attempting to withdraw US$84 million from an account owned by Raúl under an alias. A report by the US General Accounting Office indicated that Raúl Salinas transferred over $90 million out of Mexico and into private bank accounts in London and Switzerland, through a complex set of transactions between 1992 and 1994, all with the help of Citibank and its affiliates.

Other funds were returned to third parties, including Mexican billionaire Carlos Peralta Quintero, who had given the funds to Raúl Salinas to set up an investment company. The Salinas family would not receive back any of the frozen funds. However, in July 2013 a court exonerated Salinas of "unjust enrichment" and ordered that 224 million pesos (approximately $18 million) and 41 properties be returned to him. The court said that it could not explain how Salinas accumulated such wealth, but said that "so long as it is not shown that the assets acquired by public employee Raul Salinas de Gortari are proceeds derived from an abuse of his position," that he cannot be convicted of "unjust enrichment."

== In popular culture ==
In the Netflix series Narcos: Mexico (2018), "the Brother" a character based on de Gortari is portrayed by actor Mauricio Isaac. Season 2 episode 6 depicts two young boys playing war and shooting a maid and episodes 7 and 8 depict the 1988 Mexican Presidential election.

== Stroke ==
In August 2022, Salinas had a stroke, but by October, he was reported on the road to recovery.
