= I Don't Know Whether to Slit My Wrists or Leave Them Long =

- Theatrical release poster
- No sé si cortarme las venas o dejármelas largas
- Directed by: Manolo Caro
- Written by: Manolo Caro
- Starring: Raúl Méndez; Ludwika Paleta; Luis Ernesto Franco; Luis Gerardo Méndez; Zuria Vega
- Release date: August 23, 2013 (Mexico)
- Running time: 103 minutes
- Country: Mexico
- Language: Spanish

I Don't Know Whether to Slit My Wrists or Leave Them Long (Spanish: No sé si cortarme las venas o dejármelas largas) is a 2013 Mexican comedy-drama film directed by Manolo Caro. Starring Raúl Méndez, Ludwika Paleta, Luis Ernesto Franco, Luis Gerardo Méndez, and Zuria Vega, in the lead roles.

== Plot ==
The film opens with the sound of two gunshots in an apartment building in Mexico City. In one apartment, Nora confronts her husband Aarón at gunpoint after discovering his infidelity. In another, Félix, overwhelmed by the loss of his football career and the breakdown of his relationship, appears to attempt suicide. The narrative then moves back eight months to the events leading up to that night.

Nora and Aarón are a young married couple whose relationship has been damaged by mistrust and Aarón's affairs. Their neighbours Julia, an aspiring singer, and Lucas, a fashion designer, present themselves as a married couple, but are actually close friends. Their marriage of convenience allows Lucas to conceal his homosexuality from his family.

Their lives change when Félix moves into a vacant apartment in the building. A former professional footballer, he was forced to retire after suffering a serious leg injury and has since been abandoned by his girlfriend. His arrival brings the neighbours together but also exposes the tensions they have tried to hide. Lucas becomes attracted to Félix, while Julia and Aarón begin an affair. As Félix learns more about his neighbours, their lies, romantic frustrations and betrayals gradually destabilise their relationships, leading to the confrontations shown at the beginning of the film.

== Cast ==
Actor	Character
Ludwika Paleta	Nora
Zuria Vega	Julia
Luis Gerardo Méndez	Lucas
Raúl Méndez	Aarón
Luis Ernesto Franco	Félix
Juan Pablo Medina	Botarga "La flor"
Anabel Ferreira	La mamá de Lucas
José María Yazpik	Actor de telenovela
Cecilia Suárez	Actriz de telenovela
Federica García González	Actriz de Telenovela
Erick Elías	Amigo de Aarón
Marimar Vega	Novia de Félix
Livia Brito	Teibolera
Rossy de Palma	Lola
Claudia Álvarez	Chica de Mudanza
Africa Zavala	Chica de Mudanza
Mariana Treviño	Secretaria
Jorge Mondragón	Investigador
Pamela Reiter	Ana
Omar Ceballos	Amigo de Serenata
