= José Francisco Ruiz Massieu =

Mexican politician (1946–1994)

General Secretary of the Institutional Revolutionary Party
- In office 13 May 1994 – 28 September 1994
- President: Ignacio Pichardo Pagaza
- Preceded by: José Luis Lamadrid Sauza
- Succeeded by: María de los Ángeles Moreno

Governor of Guerrero
- In office 1 April 1987 – 31 March 1993
- Preceded by: Alejandro Cervantes Delgado
- Succeeded by: Rubén Figueroa Alcocer

Personal details
- Born: July 22, 1946 Acapulco, Guerrero
- Died: September 28, 1994 (aged 48) Mexico City, Mexico
- Cause of death: Assassination
- Party: Institutional Revolutionary Party (PRI)
- Profession: Lawyer, politician

José Francisco Ruiz Massieu (July 22, 1946 – September 28, 1994) was a Mexican political figure. He was governor of Guerrero from 1987 to 1993. He then served as the general secretary of the Institutional Revolutionary Party (PRI) in 1994. His term ended with his assassination.

José Francisco Ruiz Massieu, the brother-in-law of then-President of Mexico Carlos Salinas, was due to become the PRI majority leader in the Chamber of Deputies. That changed on the morning of September 28, 1994, when he was murdered by a gunman, 28-year-old Daniel Aguilar Treviño, just outside Hotel Casa Blanca, located at Lafragua street crossing Paseo de la Reforma, an avenue in the center of Mexico City. The incident occurred while Ruiz Massieu was boarding his vehicle after attending a PRI party meeting held at Casa Blanca.

== Death ==
His murder happened just six months after the murder of PRI party presidential candidate Luis Donaldo Colosio, who was gunned down on March 23, 1994, in Tijuana. Two days after the murder, on September 30, 1994, PRI deputy Fernando Rodríguez González was arrested in Zacatecas and confessed to authorities that he himself hired hitman Aguilar Treviño and his cousin to commit the murder. Daniel Aguilar Treviño confessed to authorities that he was paid US$500,000 (equivalent to $1,086,000 in 2025) by Rodríguez González himself to commit the crime.

=== Aftermath ===
When Rodríguez González was interrogated, he then revealed that PRI deputy Manuel Muñoz Rocha was involved in the planning of the murder. Muñoz Rocha, who disappeared soon after he was charged in the killing, made a phone call to a Mexico City television station saying that he was willing to come forward and give his side of the story to PGR authorities if his request for protection was met. Such request was approved by government officials, but, by then, Muñoz Rocha was never to be seen or heard of again. Two weeks later, the assistant attorney general investigating the case, Mario Ruiz Massieu, the brother of the assassinated politician, resigned because of irregularities from PRI officials in the case. He claimed he had proof of PRI party president Ignacio Pichardo Pagaza and party secretary María de los Ángeles Moreno hiding evidence and thus blocking the investigation. Pichardo Pagaza and Moreno requested for proof to be shown, but it was never found.

In October 2017, a judge in Mexico City decided to reduce Aguilar Treviño's sentence from the original 50 years down to 42, now set to be released in 2036.

Jorge Rodríguez Gónzalez who was originally sentenced to 50 years for his involvement in the murder had his sentence reduced down to 37 years (now set to be released in 2041). Then in 2018, a federal judge granted Rodríguez Gónzalez parole. However, Rodríguez Gónzalez was later denied the parole after failing to pay the needed bail amount.

=== Salinas de Gortari family involvement allegations ===
On February 28, 1995, Raúl Salinas, the brother of former President Carlos Salinas, was arrested at his Mexico City home and was considered the mastermind of the Ruiz Massieu assassination. Three days later, Mario Ruiz Massieu was arrested in Newark, United States, boarding a plane to Madrid while carrying US$46,000 (equivalent to $97,000 in 2025) in unreported cash. The government charged him with obstructing the investigation of his brother's murder. The government also found US$17 million ($35.9 million in 2025) in U.S. bank accounts linked to Mario Ruiz Massieu. He was not found deportable. Mario Ruiz Massieu committed suicide in 1999.

Raúl Salinas was found guilty on January 21, 1999. On appeal, his sentence was cut to 27 1/2 years. In June 2005, the conviction was overturned and Raúl Salinas freed.
