= Papalote Museo del Niño =

Museum for children in Mexico City, Mexico

Coordinates: 19.4117°N 99.1944°W

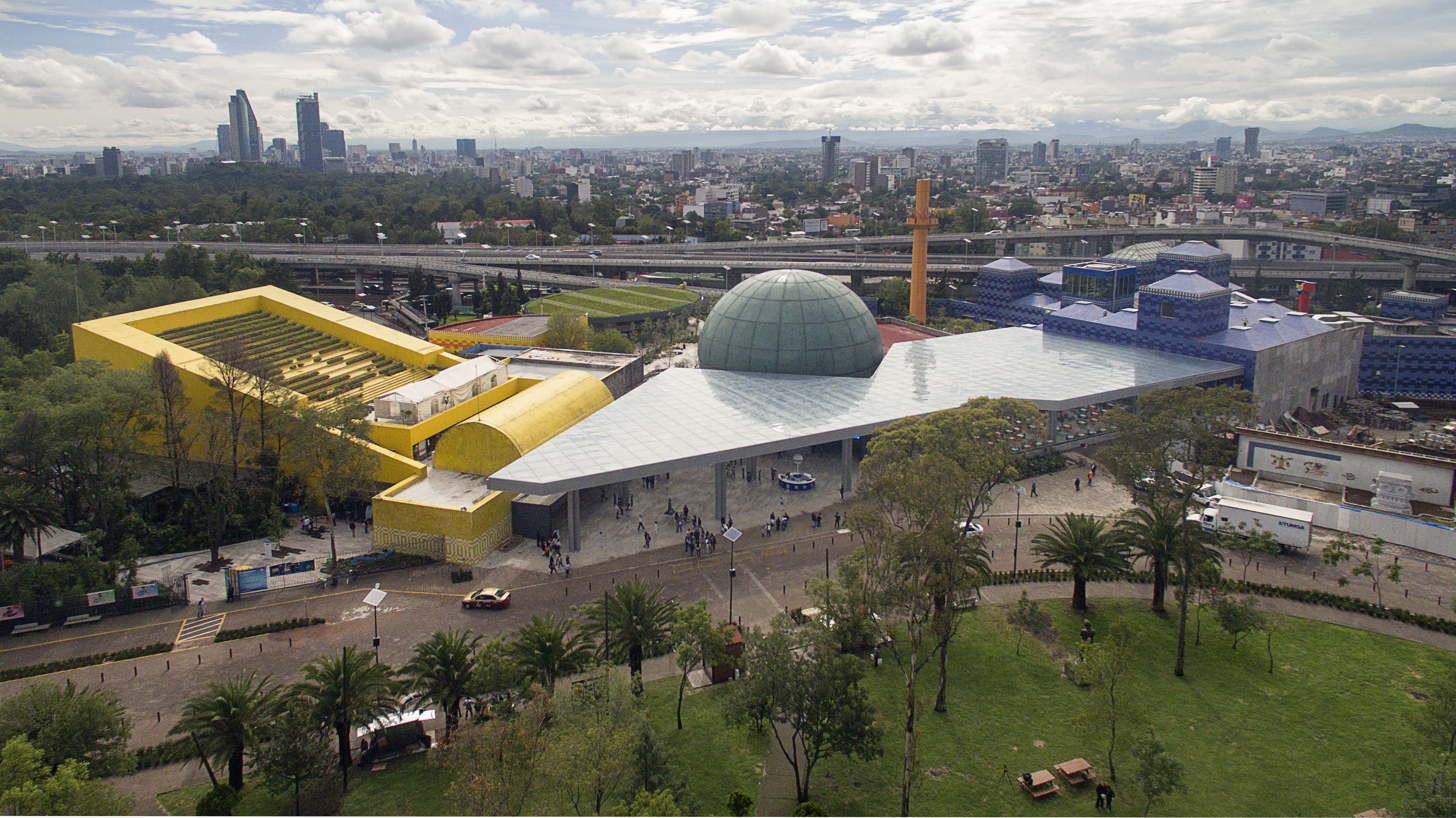

The museum Papalote Museo del Niño is located in Mexico City Bosques de Chapultepec. The museum is focused in learning, communication and working together through interactive expositions of science, technology and art for children.

== Building ==
This museum was created in 1993 by the architect Ricardo Legorreta. He designed the building with geometric figures and traditional Mexican tiles. The building was made for kids to interact, experiment and touch. The ceiling and walls were made by children.

== Areas ==
This museum has over 288 interactive exhibitions, divided into five areas where children can touch, play, and learn, as its motto says. Children become familiar with such subjects as ecology, the human body, science, and music. Each area features exhibitions about an aspect of human development.

Soy: Spanish for "I am". Focuses on the way human body and mind work. Themes featured are identity, self-esteem, and knowledge of one's body and emotions.

Comunico: Spanish for "I communicate myself". Focuses on the different ways people can communicate with each other, from spoken and sign language to radio, television and newspaper, helping to understand how each one of them works.

Pertenezco: Spanish for "I belong". Focuses on helping the children to understand themselves in terms of the spaces they belong to, going from what it is most close to them, their family, to the most complex, the universe, and the necessity to protect the environment they live in.

Comprendo: Spanish for "I understand". Focuses on science, comprising physics, mathematics, chemistry and geology, helping to understand what does science mean to the world.

Expreso: Spanish for "I express myself". Focuses on developing abilities in creativity and imagination to express ideas, feelings and thoughts throughout art, creation, discovery and appreciation.

== Other attractions ==
The museum has an IMAXscreen with a capacity for over 333 people, where educational and recreational videos are screened.

Next to it, the museum features the jardin maya, an archeology-themed garden where a prehispanic environment is recreated, including a pyramid to explore.

== Similar museums in Mexico ==
Besides its own educational role, Papalote has helped to launch similarly themed museums in other parts of the country, from which the closest to Papalote itself are:

Papalote de Cuernavaca, focused in the children's aesthetic experience through the art. In spite of not having the technological level of the Mexico City museum, features over 300 artwork among drawings, painting, photography, sculptures, installations and videos.

In 2010 the incorporation of Papalote Museum will make another museum, The Green Museum, in Monterrey, but this time focused in the educational environment.
