= Eli Eduardo de Gortari =

Mexican philosopher and engineer

Eli Eduardo de Gortari de Gortari (April 28, 1918 in Mexico City, Federal District, Mexico – July 29, 1991) was a logician, philosopher of science and engineer.

== Biography ==
Elí de Gortari was a student of the Engineering School of the National Autonomous University of Mexico (UNAM, Spanish acronym), matriculating in 1938. His goal was to become an engineer, which he achieved in two years. His commitment to public welfare led him to enroll in sanitation engineering, but he continued his studies of mathematics and philosophy. Eventually, in 1948, he would become a professor of philosophy of science. In 1949 he obtained a master's degree in philosophy and published a thesis "The Science of Logic" in the Soviet Union.

== Works ==
Among his published works are: The Science of Logic (1950); The Dialectic of Physics (1964); General Logic (1965); Introduction to Dialectic Logic (1956); Science in Mexican History (1963); Seven Essays on Modern Science (1969); The Dialectic Method (1970); Elements of Mathematical Logic (1983); Science and Consciousness in Mexico: 1767-1783 (1973); Science Methods (1977); University Reform Today and Tomorrow (1987), where he recounts his battles as an education activist; and the Dictionary of Logic (1988).

== Bibliography ==
- Boltvinik, Julio, "Economía Moral", en La Jornada en internet, viernes 3 de octubre de 2008.
- Ferrater Mora, José, Diccionario Filosófico E-J, Barcelona, Ariel, 1996.
- Poniatowska, Elena, La noche de Tlatelolco, México, Ediciones Era, 1998, 281 p.p.
- Sánchez Vázquez, Adolfo, Filosofía y circunstancias, México, Anthropos Editorial, 1997, 426 p.p.
- Gortari, Elí de, El método dialéctico, México, Editorial Grijalbo, 1970.

—————— "La relación entre la ciencia y la filosofía", en La filosofía y la ciencia natural, México, Editorial Grijalbo, 1977.

- UNAM, Premio Universidad Nacional. 1985-1997. Nuestros maestros, México, UNAM, 1998, IV t.
- Vargas Lozano, Gabriel, "Esbozo histórico de la filosofía mexicana del siglo XX", en Mario Teodoro Ramírez (coord.), Filosofía de la cultura en México, México, Editorial Plaza y Valdés, 1997.
