= Manuel Muñoz Rocha =

Disappeared Mexican politician (born 1947)

Personal details
- Born: 8 December 1947 (age 78) Ciudad Victoria, Tamaulipas, Mexico
- Party: PRI
- Occupation: Politician
- Known for: Murder suspect, disappearance

Manuel Muñoz Rocha (Note: In this Spanish name, the first or paternal surname is Muñoz and the second or maternal family name is Rocha.) (born 8 December 1947) is a Mexican politician from the Institutional Revolutionary Party (PRI). He disappeared on 29 September 1994 after being accused of involvement in the murder of his party's general secretary, José Francisco Ruiz Massieu.

== Life ==
Manuel Muñoz Rocha was born in Ciudad Victoria, capital of the state of Tamaulipas, on 8 December 1947. In the 1991 mid-term election he was elected to the Chamber of Deputies for the Institutional Revolutionary Party, representing Tamaulipas's 7th congressional district.

He was formally charged with the 28 September 1994 murder of José Francisco Ruiz Massieu, the general secretary of the PRI. A warrant for his arrest was issued on 8 October, by which time he could not be located. He was declared to have disappeared in June 1999 and, in 2009, the arrest warrant expired.
