= Antonio Castañón =

Mexican businessman

Antonio Castanon (or Toño Castañon) is a Mexican businessman. (1954)

== Alleged money laundering ==
In November, 1995, Antonio Castañon and Paulina Castañon, Raúl Salinas's wife, were arrested in Geneva, Switzerland after attempting to withdraw US$84 million from an account owned by Raúl Salinas de Gortari, brother of Mexican President Carlos Salinas de Gortari. Their capture led to the unveiling of a vast family fortune spread around the world amounting to hundreds of millions of dollars. A report by the U.S. General Accounting Office indicated that on this case. Over $90 million were transferred out of Mexico and into private bank accounts in Switzerland and London, through a complex set of transactions between 1992 and 1994, using a private investment company named Trocca, all with the help of Citibank and its affiliates. In 2008, the government of Switzerland turned over $74 million, out of $110 million in accounts held by Trocca to the government of Mexico. The Swiss Justice Ministry indicated that the Mexican government had demonstrated that $66 million of the funds had been misappropriated, and the funds, with interest, were returned to Mexico. The bank accounts were held at Pictet & Cie, Citibank Zurich, Julius Baer Bank, and Banque privée Edmond de Rothschild in Geneva and Zurich. All funds in Mexico were returned to third parties, including Mexican billionaire Carlos Peralta Quintero, who had given funds to set up the investment company. Antonio and Paulina Castañon were released one week after the arrest when the Mexican, U.S and Swiss governments found no grounds to charge them.
