= Óscar Almaraz Smer =

Mexican politician (1968–2025)

Member of the Congress of Tamaulipas
- In office 1 January 2011 – 30 September 2013
- Preceded by: Felipe Neri Garza Narváez
- Succeeded by: Blanca Guadalupe Valles Rodríguez
- Constituency: 14th district

Municipal President of Victoria, Tamaulipas
- In office 1 October 2016 – 14 May 2018
- Preceded by: Eugenio Benavides Benavides
- Succeeded by: Ricardo Rodríguez Martínez
- In office 2 July 2018 – 30 September 2018
- Preceded by: Ricardo Rodríguez Martínez
- Succeeded by: Xicoténcatl González Uresti

Member of the Chamber of Deputies of Mexico
- In office 1 September 2021 – 31 August 2024
- Preceded by: Mario Alberto Ramos Tamez
- Succeeded by: José Braña Mojica
- Constituency: Tamaulipas's 5th

Personal details
- Born: Óscar de Jesús Almaraz Smer; 13 March 1968 Ciudad Victoria, Tamaulipas, Mexico
- Died: 18 September 2025 (aged 57) Ciudad Victoria, Tamaulipas, Mexico
- Party: PRI (until 2021); PAN (from 2021)
- Education: Autonomous University of Tamaulipas

Óscar de Jesús Almaraz Smer (13 March 1968 – 18 September 2025) was a Mexican politician and businessman. He served as Secretary of Finance of Tamaulipas from 2004 to 2010, as a local deputy in the state congress from 2011 to 2013, and as municipal president of Ciudad Victoria from 2016 to 2018. Originally a member of the Institutional Revolutionary Party, he later joined the National Action Party and was elected federal deputy for Tamaulipas's 5th district in the LXV Legislature (2021–2024).

== Early life and education ==
Almaraz was born in Ciudad Victoria on 13 March 1968. He studied public accounting at the Autonomous University of Tamaulipas.

== Career ==
Almaraz served as Secretary of Finance in the administration of Governor Eugenio Hernández Flores from 2004 to 2010, and from 2011 to 2013 was a local deputy for the Institutional Revolutionary Party (PRI). He was elected municipal president of Ciudad Victoria for the PRI, serving from 2016 to 2018. During his term, he oversaw infrastructure projects and policies related to basic services.

Almaraz resigned from the party in 2021. That same year, he ran as the National Action Party (PAN) candidate for federal deputy for Tamaulipas's 5th district and was elected to the LXV Legislature, which sat until 2024. He held posts in the Commission on Federalism and Municipal Development and participated in the commissions on Migration Affairs, Budget, and Public Accounts. As a deputy, Almaraz introduced an initiative to amend Article 95 of the Constitution to make plagiarism a disqualifying factor for Supreme Court nominees. He also presented a bill to reform the Federal Penal Code so that violent deaths of women would be presumed feminicide and investigated as such from the outset.

In the 2024 municipal election, Almaraz contested the mayoralty under the PAN banner, but was defeated by the Morena candidate Eduardo Gattás.

In May 2024, the Auditoría Superior del Estado de Tamaulipas (State Audit Office of Tamaulipas) initiated an investigation into alleged irregular payments made to 18 companies during Almaraz's administration as municipal president of Ciudad Victoria. The audit office requested documentation from the municipal government, citing possible conflicts of interest, mismanagement of public funds, and potential damage to the municipal treasury.

In 2025, Almaraz dedicated himself to his restaurant business, operating a venue called La Corte.

== Personal life ==
Almaraz was married to Señora Tony Sáenz de Almaraz.

== Death ==
On 18 September 2025, Almaraz died of a heart attack at the age of 57, in Ciudad Victoria, Tamaulipas.
