= Humberto Filizola =

Mexican professor and politician (born 1950)

Deputy for Tamaulipas
- In office 1 September 2003 – 31 August 2006
- Constituency: Tamaulipas's 5th district
- Preceded by: Enrique Garza Támez
- Succeeded by: Miguel Ángel González Salum

Personal details
- Born: Humberto Francisco Filizola Haces; 2 February 1950 (age 76) Ciudad Victoria, Tamaulipas, Mexico
- Party: PRI
- Profession: Professor, politician
Association football career
- Position: Striker
Senior career*
| Years | Team | Apps | (Gls) |
| 1994 | Correcaminos UAT | 1 | (0) |
| Total | | 1 | (0) |
- * Club domestic league appearances and goals

Humberto Francisco Filizola Haces (born 2 February 1950) is a Mexican former professor and politician affiliated with the Institutional Revolutionary Party (PRI). Between 2003 and 2006, he served as a deputy during the 59th session of Congress, representing Tamaulipas's 5th district based in his hometown of Ciudad Victoria, Tamaulipas. He had previously served as the rector of the Autonomous University of Tamaulipas (UAT), between 1991 and 2003.

Oddly, Filizola had a short-lived career as a professional football player for Correcaminos, the team representing the university of which he was the incumbent rector. On the last matchday of the 1993–94 Mexican Primera División season, he appeared for 29 minutes against Club América before being substituted. Although he almost managed to score a goal at one point, he and manager Jesús Bracamontes were lampooned by the press. Filizola, who was 44 years old at the time, defended his participation, saying that he had wanted to give an example of hard work and courage to the youth from Tamaulipas.
