= Francisco Cabeza de Vaca =

Governor of Tamaulipas, Mexico

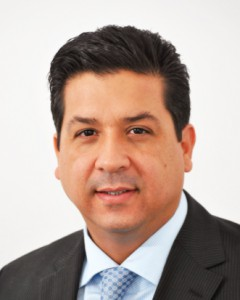

Governor of Tamaulipas
- In office 1 October 2016 – 30 September 2022
- Preceded by: Egidio Torre Cantú
- Succeeded by: Américo Villarreal Anaya

Senator for Tamaulipas
- In office 1 September 2012 – 29 January 2016
- Preceded by: José Julián Sacramento Garza
- Succeeded by: Sandra Luz García Guajardo

Member of the Congress of Tamaulipas
- In office 1 January 2008 – 10 June 2010

Mayor of Reynosa
- In office 2005–2007
- Preceded by: Serapio Cantú Barragán
- Succeeded by: Miguel Ángel Villarreal Ongay

Federal deputy for Tamaulipas's 2nd district
- In office 1 September 2000 – 31 August 2003
- Preceded by: Armando Garza Cantú
- Succeeded by: Maki Esther Ortíz

Personal details
- Born: Francisco Javier García Cabeza de Vaca; 17 September 1967 (age 59) McAllen, Texas, U.S.
- Citizenship: Mexico, United States
- Party: National Action Party
- Education: Houston Baptist University (BS); University of Monterrey (MA)

Francisco Javier García Cabeza de Vaca (born 17 September 1967) is a Mexican politician affiliated with the National Action Party (PAN). He was the governor of Tamaulipas from 2016 to 2022 and previously served as a local and federal legislator, having served a term in the Congress of Tamaulipas, a term in the federal Chamber of Deputies, and three and a half years in the Senate.

He was accused by Emilio Lozoya Austin, former director of Pemex, in July 2020 of receiving bribes in 2013–2014 to support energy reform legislation.

A warrant for his arrest was issued on 19 May 2021 by the federal Attorney General's Office, which accused him of corruption. The governor, who retained immunity only within Tamaulipas after a constitutional dispute on the matter, rejected the accusations as politically motivated.

== Life ==
Francisco Javier García Cabeza de Vaca was born in McAllen, Texas, and holds dual U.S. and Mexican citizenship; he graduated from McAllen Memorial High School. His family owns Maquinados Industriales de Reynosa and Desarrolladora Cava, companies that have provided service to such clients as Pemex, Caminos y Puentes Federales (CAPUFE), and the National Water Commission (CONAGUA). At the age of 12, he competed as a track and field athlete, the 1979 Tamaulipas state champion. As a result, he was sent to the National Athletic Tournament in Monterrey representing his home state. He received undergraduate degrees in business administration and branding from Houston Baptist University; while at HBU, he played on the school's soccer team. He also obtained a master's degree from the Universidad de Monterrey.

In the late 1990s, García joined the PAN and began his political career. He served as a regional coordinator for the 1998 Tamaulipas gubernatorial election, and in 2000, he coordinated the Organización Amigos de Fox A.C. in the north of Tamaulipas and was a member of the Consejo Estatal Amigos de Fox, both organizations devoted to the presidential campaign of Vicente Fox. That same year, voters sent him to the 58th Congress, where he served as the secretary of the Commission on Population, Borders and Migratory Matters and sat on two work commissions. In 2004, García became a national councilor for the PAN, a position he would hold until 2013.

Around this time, García founded Productos Chamoyada, S.A. de C.V., a Reynosa-based company devoted to the creation of confectionery products. In November 2009, the United States Food and Drug Administration circulated Import Alert 33–12, ordering the seizure of all hard and soft candies containing sweet peppers that Chamoyada and other companies attempted to export into the United States. The alert was issued because a 1997 inspection of similar sweets by the FDA's Dallas Division found them to contain "rodent filth and insect filth".

After a failed bid in 2002, Reynosa voters elected García to the municipal presidency from 2005 to 2007; during this time, he served as the liaison between mayors and the 2006 PAN presidential candidate, Felipe Calderón Hinojosa. He then bounced around in different positions. From 2008 to 2010, he represented Reynosa in the 60th session of the Congress of Tamaulipas, heading the PAN parliamentary group in the state congress. For a time in 2011, he was the director general of the Commission for the Regularization of Land Holdings (CORETT).

In 2012, García returned to Congress, this time as a senator for the 62nd and 63rd congressional sessions. He presided over the Agrarian Reform Commission and served on the commissions for the Navy, Communications and Transportation, and Energy; at the start of the 63rd session, he also picked up the presidency of the National Defense Commission. Among his legislative projects were laws that toughened sanctions against judges and politicians involved with organized crime and penalized the improper use of uniforms.

== 2016 gubernatorial campaign ==
Effective 29 January 2016, García resigned from the Chamber of Deputies to pursue the governorship of Tamaulipas.

During the elections, a video attributed to Anonymous was released claiming that García owned a variety of undeclared properties, including a US$2.5 million home in an exclusive Mexico City golf club allegedly acquired in 2015. The Party of the Democratic Revolution (PRD) claimed that in three municipalities, organized crime had threatened all political parties and ordered them to support García's election.

In the 5 June elections, García earned 50.1 percent of the vote, making him the first non-PRI governor of the state in 86 years. He beat Baltazar Hinojosa Ochoa, the PRI candidate.

== Governor 2016-2022 ==
By 2021, he was known as an "outspoken critic" of President Andrés Manuel López Obrador.

=== Immunity conflict ===
In 2021, the Attorney General of Mexico (FGR) asked the Congress of Tamaulipas to remove García's fuero (parliamentary immunity) from prosecution, claiming there was evidence of ties to drug cartels, money-laundering, and tax fraud. The request was confirmed by MORENA deputy Ignacio Mier on 23 February 2021, although representatives of the PAN party insisted the move was politically motivated in light of the 2021 elections. Early in 2021, when he was accused of money laundering, the Financial Intelligence Unit (UIF) claimed García Cabeca de Vaca owned numerous properties in Mexico and Texas, with the governor in March saying none of the homes in the report were his. On 22 March 2021 he appeared before the FGR to hear the accusations against him, gaining access to the investigation files against him that he'd previously been denied access to. Garcia Cabeza de Vaca affirmed he would prove his innocence.

By April 2021, while he had been accused of organized crime and money laundering, there had been no evidence found to support the accusations. At the end of April 2021, the Chamber of Deputies voted 302 in favor, 134 against, and 14 abstaining for removing García Cabeza de Vaca's immunity against federal charges, which could lead to him being potentially charged with tax evasion.

=== Warrant conflict ===
A warrant was issued for García Cabeza de Vaca's arrest on 19 May 2021 by the Attorney General's Office, which accused him of corruption. His bank accounts were also reported frozen by federal prosecutors and the National Migration Institute (INM) announced it had issued an immigration alert to track his movements. In response to the media noting the warrant originated in the National Palace, President López Obrador asserted he had not given instructions for the arrest as "The Public Prosecutor's Office is autonomous" and revenge was "not his strength".

On Twitter the governor rejected the accusations as politically motivated, while the National Action Party said the warrant represented a "break in the constitutional order for political reasons." At the time, "a disagreement between courts, prosecutors and state and federal legislatures [made] it unclear whether the Tamaulipas state governor can be arrested, or whether he still enjoys immunity from prosecution as an elected official." While the federal Congress, dominated by the party of the president, had previously voted to remove immunity, while state legislature refused to recognize the vote. The Supreme Court had desisted on sharing an opinion, which according to the Associated Press, appeared to leave the governor "in a situation of retaining his immunity" only within Tamaulipas. On 20 May 2021, Congress of Tamaulipas agreed to sue the Attorney Generals of the Republic (FGR) and General of the State over the arrest warrant, arguing it violated their sovereignty. PAN politicians in the Congress stressed the Attorney General lacked the jurisdiction to detain García Cabeza de Vaca, and that it was not considering an interim governor appointment.

On 20 May 2021, President López Obrador said that if the United States sent any diplomatic documents concerning the "bizarre standoff" between the president and governor, he would possibly publish them himself, even if they contained sensitive information. He displayed a 4 May letter from the legal attaché of the US Embassy, asking for "information on Garcia Cabeza de Vaca as part of a U.S. money laundering investigation." On 21 May 2021, the newspaper Milenio reported that the Financial Intelligence Unit had "handed over all information" about Cabeza de Vaca and the entirety of his family to the FBI, the DEA, and FinCEN in the United States.

On 27 May 2021, UIF filed a complaint against García Cabeza de Vaca for embezzlement. After he hired a law firm in Houston, Texas, the FIU asked the FGR to investigate whether he was using public funds to pay for legal advisory services.

=== Return to public events ===
On 26 May 2021, a judge suspended the arrest warrant, preventing the FGR from arresting him. He was reported to hold a videoconference meeting at Casa Tam with governors and the secretary of the interior on 27 May 2021, reporting the meeting on his Twitter account. On 30 May 2021, a judge ruled that despite the pulled warrant, criminal proceedings could not be prevented. On 31 May 2021, he was present at an event to launch a "pilot plan" to re-open schools for young children in the state. On 6 June 2021, it was reported he had ended his contractual relationship with his lawyer and was changing his defense team. On 7 June 2021, the UIF was ordered to unfreeze the accounts of his relatives, including his mother, wife, and brother. The judge argued the freezes were unconstitutional, as the origin and legal support of the action by the FIU was unknown and undeclared. On 22 June, a federal judge is to decide whether the governor would continue to be granted protection from federal arrest.

== See also ==
- List of municipal presidents of Reynosa
