= Enrique Cárdenas del Avellano =

Mexican politician

Enrique Cárdenas

Deputy of the Congress of the Union, Tamaulipas's 5th district
- In office 1 September 2012 – 31 August 2015
- Preceded by: Rodolfo Torre Cantú
- Succeeded by: Miguel Ángel González Salum

Deputy of the Congress of the Union, Tamaulipas's 6th district
- In office 1 September 2006 – 31 August 2009
- Preceded by: Óscar Martín Ramos
- Succeeded by: Luis Alejandro Guevara Cobos

Member of the Congress of Tamaulipas (Plurinominal)
- In office 1 January 2002 – 31 December 2004

Municipal president of Victoria, Tamaulipas
- In office 1 January 1999 – 27 September 2000
- Preceded by: Pascual Ruiz García
- Succeeded by: Egidio Torre Cantú, as Acting municipal president

Personal details
- Born: 4 September 1957 (age 68) Matamoros, Tamaulipas, Mexico
- Party: PRI
- Parents: Enrique Cárdenas González (father); Bertha del Avellano (mother)

Enrique Cárdenas del Avellano (born 4 September 1957) is a Mexican politician affiliated with the Institutional Revolutionary Party (PRI).

He has been elected to the Chamber of Deputies on two occasions: in the 2006 general election (60th Congress) for Tamaulipas's 6th district, and in the 2012 general election (62nd Congress) for Tamaulipas's 5th district.
