= 5th federal electoral district of Tamaulipas =

Federal electoral district of Mexico

Tamaulipas's 5th
- Electoral district of the Chamber of Deputies of Mexico

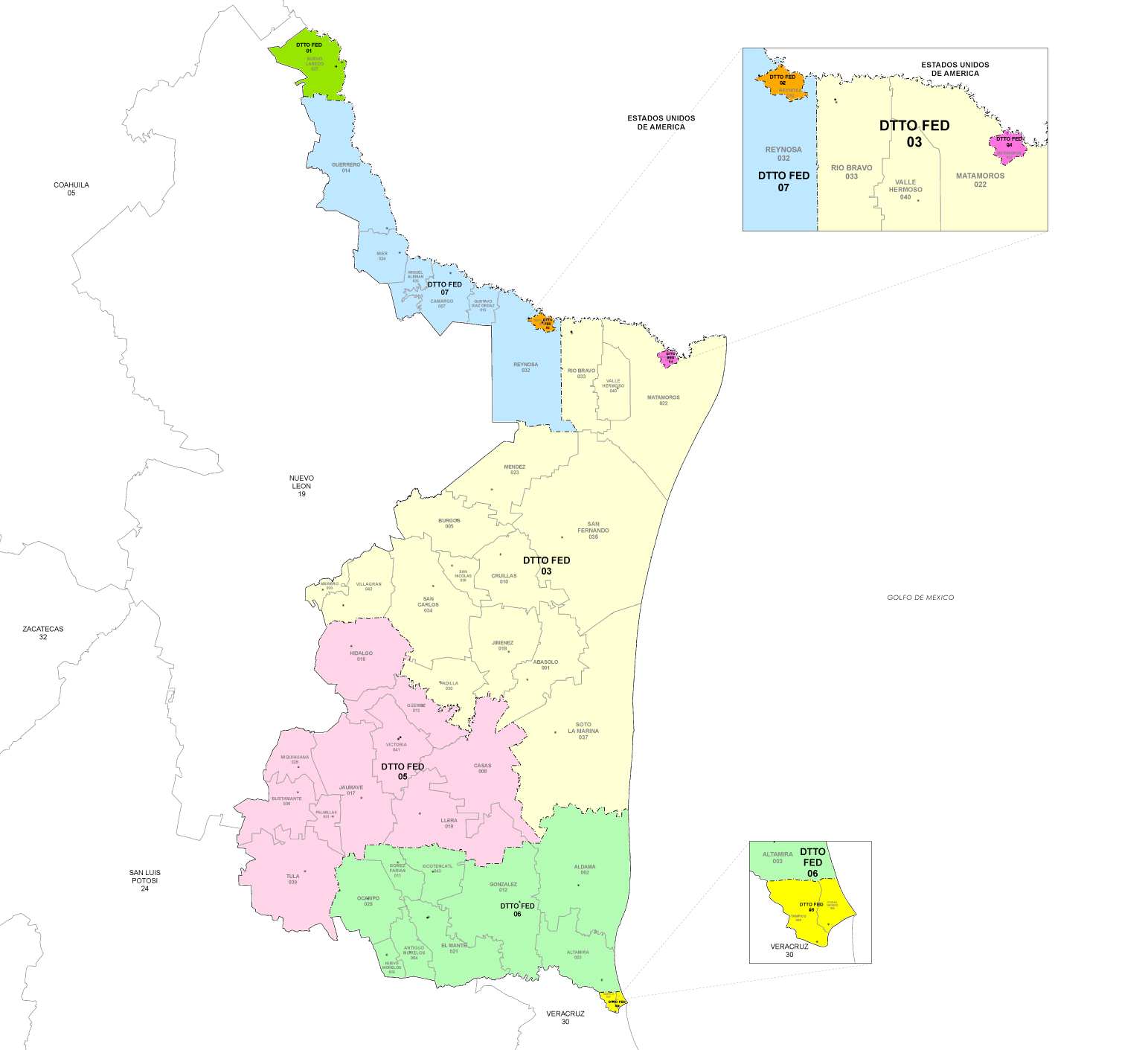
- 5th district since 2023

Incumbent
- Member: José Braña Mojica
- Party: ▌Ecologist Green Party
- Congress: 66th (2024–2027)

District
- State: Tamaulipas
- Head town: Ciudad Victoria
- Coordinates: 22°40′N 99°08′W
- Covers: 10 municipalities: Bustamante, Casas, Güémez, Hidalgo, Jaumave, Llera, Miquihuana, Palmillas, Tula, Victoria
- PR region: Second
- Precincts: 262
- Population: 457,961 (2020 census)

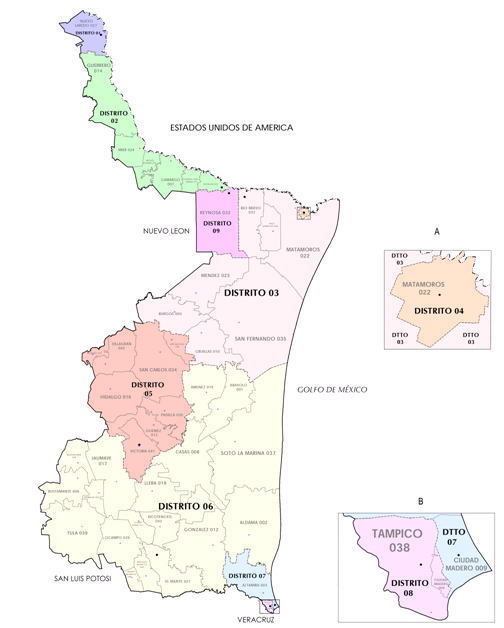
Tamaulipas's districts in 2017–2022

The 5th federal electoral district of Tamaulipas (Spanish: Distrito electoral federal 05 de Tamaulipas) is one of the 300 electoral districts into which Mexico is divided for elections to the federal Chamber of Deputies and one of eight such districts in the state of Tamaulipas.

It elects one deputy to the lower house of Congress for each three-year legislative session by means of the first-past-the-post system. Votes cast in the district also count towards the calculation of proportional representation ("plurinominal") deputies elected from the second region.

The current member for the district, elected in the 2024 general election, is José Braña Mojica of the Ecologist Green Party of Mexico (PVEM).

== District territory ==
Tamaulipas lost a district in the 2023 districting plan adopted by the National Electoral Institute (INE), which is to be used for the 2024, 2027 and 2030 federal elections. The reconfigured 5th district covers the south-west of the state and comprises 262 electoral precincts (secciones electorales) across 10 of the state's 43 municipalities:

- Bustamante, Casas, Güémez, Hidalgo, Jaumave, Llera, Miquihuana, Palmillas, Tula and Victoria.

The head town (cabecera distrital), where results from individual polling stations are gathered together and tallied, is the state capital, Ciudad Victoria. The district reported a population of 457,961 in the 2020 census.

== Previous districting schemes ==
Evolution of electoral district numbers
	1974	1978	1996	2005	2017	2023
Tamaulipas	6	9	8	8	9	8
Chamber of Deputies	196	300				

2017–2022

Between 2017 and 2022, Tamaulipas accounted for nine single-member congressional seats. The 5th district's head town was at Ciudad Victoria and it covered 221 precincts across eight municipalities:
- Güémez, Hidalgo, Mainero, Padilla, San Carlos, San Nicolás, Victoria and Villagrán.

2005–2017

Under the 2005 plan, Tamaulipas had eight districts. The 5th district had the same configuration as in the 2017 scheme but covered 222 precincts.

1996–2005

In the 1996 scheme, under which Tamaulipas lost a single-member seat, the district had its head town at Ciudad Victoria and it comprised 10 municipalities:
- Bustamante, Casas, Güémez, Hidalgo, Jaumave, Mainero, Miquihuana, Palmillas, Victoria and Villagrán.

1978–1996

The districting scheme in force from 1978 to 1996 was the result of the 1977 electoral reforms, which increased the number of single-member seats in the Chamber of Deputies from 196 to 300. Under that plan, Tamaulipas's seat allocation rose from six to nine. The 5th district's head town was at Tampico and it covered the city and its surrounding municipality.

== Deputies returned to Congress ==
(Mexico) National parties
- Current
- PAN
- PRI
- PT
- PVEM
- MC
- Morena
- PAZ
- Somos
- Defunct or local only
- PLM
- PNR
- PRM
- PNM
- PP
- PPS
- PARM
- PFCRN
- CON
- PANAL
- PSD
- PES
- PES
- PRD

Tamaulipas's 5th district
Election	Deputy	Party	Term	Legislature
The 5th district was suspended between 1930 and 1961.
...
1979	Javier González Alonzo	Institutional Revolutionary Party	1979–1982	51st Congress
1982	Roberto González Barba	Institutional Revolutionary Party	1982–1985	52nd Congress
1985	Joaquín Contreras Cantú	Institutional Revolutionary Party	1985–1988	53rd Congress
1988	Álvaro Homero Garza Cantú	Institutional Revolutionary Party	1988–1991	54th Congress
1991	María del Carmen Bolado del Real	National Action Party (Mexico)	1991–1994	55th Congress
1994	Delfina Eliseo Ramírez	Institutional Revolutionary Party	1994–1997	56th Congress
1997	Laura Alicia Garza Galindo	Institutional Revolutionary Party	1997–2000	57th Congress
2000	Eugenio Javier Hernández Flores (Note: Hernández Flores resigned his seat on 3 July 2001 and was replaced for the remainder of his term by his alternate, Garza Tamez.); Enrique Garza Tamez	Institutional Revolutionary Party	2000–2001; 2001–2003	58th Congress
2003	Humberto Francisco Filizola Haces	Institutional Revolutionary Party	2003–2006	59th Congress
2006	Miguel Ángel González Salum	Institutional Revolutionary Party	2006–2009	60th Congress
2009	Rodolfo Torre Cantú (Note: Torre Cantú was assassinated on 28 June 2010 while campaigning for governor of Tamaulipas. He was replaced for the remainder of his term by his alternate, Canseco Gómez.); Morelos Jaime Carlos Canseco Gómez	Institutional Revolutionary Party	2009–2010; 2010–2012	61st Congress
2012	Enrique Cárdenas del Avellano	Institutional Revolutionary Party	2012–2015	62nd Congress
2015	Miguel Ángel González Salum	Institutional Revolutionary Party	2015–2018	63rd Congress
2018	Mario Alberto Ramos Tamez	National Action Party (Mexico)	2018–2021	64th Congress
2021	Óscar de Jesús Almaraz Smer	National Action Party (Mexico)	2021–2024	65th Congress
2024	José Braña Mojica	Ecologist Green Party of Mexico	2024–2027	66th Congress

== Presidential elections ==
Tamaulipas's 5th district
Election	District won by	Party or coalition	%
2018	Andrés Manuel López Obrador	Juntos Haremos Historia	41.1461
2024	Claudia Sheinbaum Pardo	Sigamos Haciendo Historia	60.9727
