= Enrique Cárdenas =

Enrique Cárdenas or Cardenas may refer to:

- Enrique Cárdenas del Avellano (born 1957), Mexican politician
- Enrique Cárdenas González (1927–2018), Mexican politician, governor of Tamaulipas
- Enrique Cárdenas de la Peña (1920–2010), Mexican physician and historian, member of the Academia Mexicana de la Lengua
- Enrique Cárdenas Sánchez (born 1954), Mexican economist and politician, contended the 2019 Puebla special elections
- Enrique Cardenas (soccer) (born 1991), U.S. soccer player
