= Enrique Garza Támez =

Mexican politician

Enrique Garza Tamez (born 12 May 1956) is a civil service administrator in the Mexican state of Tamaulipas.

His political and administrative offices have included:

- Deputy Director of State Property.
- Secretary of the City Hall of Victoria.
- Director of Crime Prevention, appointed by the State Governor.
- Legal adviser of the Executive Local Meeting of the IFE.
- Committee representative for planning the development of the State.
- Local representative in the 56th session of the Congress of Tamaulipas.
- Director of State Legal Issues, appointed by the State Governor.
- President of the Colosio Foundation, A.C.
- Federal deputy (alternate of Eugenio Hernández Flores) for Tamaulipas's 5th district during the 58th Congress.

In 2011, he was General Secretary of the state Congress in Tamaulipas. He has a Law degree from the Universidad Autónoma de Nuevo León (UANL) and a Master of Public Administration from the Universidad Autónoma de Tamaulipas (UAT). He has published: Las Elecciones en Tamaulipas, Fundamentos Jurídicos (or Judicial Foundations of the Tamaulipas Elections) (1992); La Reforma del '95 (or Legal Reforms of 1995) (1995) and Leyes y Reglamentos de Tamaulipas 1921-2003 (or Laws and Regulations of Tamaulipas) (2003).
