= Tomás Yarrington =

Mexican criminal and former politician

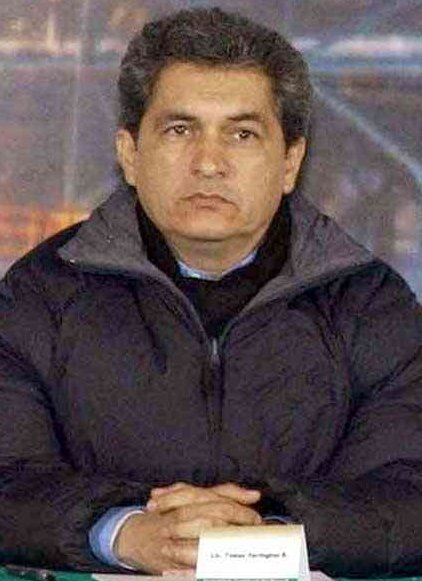

Governor of Tamaulipas
- In office 5 February 1999 – 31 December 2004
- Preceded by: Manuel Cavazos Lerma
- Succeeded by: Eugenio Hernández Flores

Personal details
- Born: Tomás Jesús Yarrington Ruvalcaba; 7 March 1957 (age 69) Matamoros, Tamaulipas
- Party: Institutional Revolutionary Party (until 2016)
- Spouse: Maria Antonieta Morales (m. 1980)
- Education: Monterrey Institute of Technology and Higher Education (BA); Autonomous University of Nuevo León) (LLB); University of Southern California (MPA)

Tomás Jesús Yarrington Ruvalcaba (Spanish pronunciation: [toˈmas xeˈsus ˈʝarinton ruβalˈkaβa], born 7 March 1957) is a Mexican criminal. Formerly a politician affiliated with the Institutional Revolutionary Party (PRI), he held office as the mayor of Matamoros from 1993 to 1995 and as the governor of Tamaulipas from 1999 to 2005. Yarrington sought nomination for the presidential elections for the PRI in 2005.

Yarrington graduated with bachelor's degrees in economics and law from the Monterrey Institute of Technology and Higher Studies and the Autonomous University of Nuevo León respectively. He also received a master's degree in public administration from the University of Southern California. In 1991 he was elected to the Chamber of Deputies for Tamaulipas's 3rd district and from 1993 until 1995 he served as mayor of Matamoros, Tamaulipas. Later on, he headed the local branch of the Institutional Revolutionary Party, joined the cabinet of Manuel Cavazos Lerma as state secretary of finance, and served as governor of Tamaulipas (1999–2004). After leaving the governorship, Yarrington entered the presidential primaries by mid-2005.

He was accused in early 2012 of laundering money for Los Zetas and the Gulf Cartel after a drug cartel member was apprehended and informed the DEA that Yarringnton had ties with the leaders of the drug trafficking organizations. In addition, Yarrington was accused of plotting the assassination of Rodolfo Torre Cantú, the former candidate for state governor in Tamaulipas, along with the Gulf Cartel, which reportedly carried out the ambush that killed the politician. He was arrested in Florence, Italy, on 9 April 2017.

== Organized crime allegations ==
Yarrington's accusations of his criminal activities began in November 2011, when the slain body of a businessman and rancher named Alfonso Peña-Argüelles was publicly displayed in the border city of Nuevo Laredo, Tamaulipas. Along with the body was a message left by Los Zetas accusing Peña-Argüelles' brother of laundering money for Yarrington. On 30 January 2012, the Attorney General of Mexico issued a communiqué ordering the past three governors of Tamaulipas – Manuel Cavazos Lerma, Eugenio Hernández Flores, and Tomás Yarrington – to remain in the country because they were being investigated for possible correlation with the Mexican drug cartels. After a court case in San Antonio, Texas, the United States Drug Enforcement Agency (DEA) accused Yarrington of laundering money for Los Zetas and the Gulf Cartel from 1999 to 2004, his time as governor. This information was obtained after Antonio Peña-Argüelles, an alleged high-ranking drug cartel member, was arrested and claimed that Yarrington had "direct personal relationship with Zeta leaders." In addition, Yarrington was accused of plotting the assassination of Rodolfo Torre Cantú, the former candidate for governor in Tamaulipas's 2010 elections; the ambushed that killed Torre Cantú was allegedly carried out by Jorge Eduardo Costilla Sánchez, the supreme leader of the Gulf cartel.

According to the DEA's protected witness, Torre Cantú was assassinated because he affected the interests of a construction company that the Gulf cartel was sponsoring. Moreover, Excélsior notes that Torre Cantú was also killed because he did not have a good relationship with Yarrington and did not guarantee agreements with the cartels. However, Egidio Torre Cantú, the brother of Rodolfo, took his place and became the governor of Tamaulipas after his assassination, and allied with the Mexican Armed Forces to combat the cartels in hopes of avoiding what happened to his brother.

Yarrington was also accused of allegedly receiving money from Osiel Cárdenas Guillén, the former drug boss of the Gulf cartel, to finance his political campaign for the presidential campaign in 2005 against Roberto Madrazo; according to the reports of Animal Político, Osiel asked Costilla Sánchez and Heriberto Lazcano Lazcano, his associates, to send millions of dollars to Yarrington's collaborators, with hopes of escaping from prison if Yarrington became president, just like Joaquín Guzmán Loera (a.k.a. El Chapo). In a civil forfeiture lawsuit filed in Corpus Christi on 12 May 2012, Yarrington is said to face forfeiture of a condominium he owns in South Padre Island that federal authorities believe he purchased with "illegally obtained funds" and under another name to avoid detection by law enforcement. Court records say that Yarrington used $450,000 from the Gulf cartel to pay the 14th floor unit. The indictment also alleged that a Mexican businessman known as Fernando Alejandro Cano Martínez used several corporate entities in Texas to launder money by the Gulf Cartel to pay top politicians in Tamaulipas. These bribes were then paid to the politicians in Tamaulipas in exchange for little to no police intervention in the Gulf Cartel's trafficking and money laundering activities. Cano Martínez is also accused of bank fraud because he obtained several bank loans with false information. The U.S. authorities are trying to confiscate Yarrington's condominium in South Padre Island and a 46-acre property in San Antonio, Texas. All these properties are believed to have been bought by Yarrington with drug proceeds from the Gulf Cartel, a criminal organization headquartered in the city of Matamoros, Tamaulipas (where he served as mayor). The laundered money is believed to have granted the Gulf Cartel and Los Zetas "political influence" in the state of Tamaulipas.

Nonetheless, Yarrington has publicly acknowledged that he is the subject of the investigation but denied any links to organized crime. Yarrington's lawyer, in addition, said that the ex-governor has no connection with organized crime and that the accusations against him are attempts made by other people in federal investigations to "improve their own situations." Yarrington has not been officially charged with any crimes, but U.S. federal prosecutors filed two civil forfeiture cases against him, seeking to seize more than $7 million U.S. dollars in properties.

=== Yarrington's associates ===
Fernando Alejandro Cano Martínez, a businessman from Ciudad Victoria, Tamaulipas, and an alleged financial operator of the Gulf cartel, was indicted for conspiracy to launder money and commit bank fraud on 22 May 2012. The indictment charges Cano Martínez with using a number of corporations in Texas to launder money for the Gulf Cartel, a drug trafficking organization in Mexico, to then using millions of dollars as bribes for politicians in Tamaulipas. The bribes, which were paid directly to the politicians since 1998 or earlier, were used to convince the authorities to not intervene in the illegal activities of the Gulf cartel. Cano-Martínez controlled the bribes directed to the politicians and established corporal entities in Texas to hide the nature of his criminal activities. Court records show that he had "one or more unindicted co-conspirators" working with him that helped him obtain a $6.7 million loan to buy a 46-acre property in San Antonio, Texas. Prosecutors are seeking a $40 million forfeiture from Cano-Martínez's assets. The indictment also alleges that Cano Martínez used millions of dollars in loans from a number of U.S. banks to invest in real estate and for an airplane of his own. From the years 2007 and 2009, Cano Martínez and his associates used at least 10 different bank accounts in Mexico to move millions of dollars to a Mexican money transmitter, and then moved that cash to U.S. bank accounts. If convicted, Cano Martínez may face up to 20 years in prison for the money laundering charges against him. Warrants have been issued for his apprehension in both the U.S. and Mexico since he is currently at large.

On 24 May 2012, the Mexican military raided the house and workplace of the businessman Napoleón Rodríguez de la Garza in Matamoros, Tamaulipas. Rodríguez was the treasurer of Yarrington during his time as mayor of Matamoros and the straw man purchaser of the condominium in South Padre Island, Texas. The condo was bought under Rodríguez to avoid detection from federal agents, but prosecutors believe Yarrington is the actual owner. They also allege that Yarrington gave the money back after Rodríguez bought the $450,000 condo and that Yarrington pays the annual taxes and fees for maintenance. In addition, Rodríguez is believed to have assisted Yarrington during his political campaigns and received contracts to supply Matamoros and the state of Tamaulipas with supplies from his hardware company. Rodríguez was taken to SIEDO for further questioning; he was detained by the PGR on 28 May 2012 and will remain under custody for 40 days. Nonetheless, he accepted to be a straw purchaser for Yarrington. The U.S. authorities began the investigation of other functionaries that worked for the ex-governor of Tamaulipas and close associate of Yarrington, Eugenio Hernández Flores. According to government reports, a man known as Alberto Berlanga Bolado – owner of the GMC, SA de CV and former functionary during Hernandez's time in office, was linked to money laundering and bribes from the Gulf cartel on 26 May 2012. Berlanga's construction company was one of the most prominent during Hernández's governorship, and served as the major contract seller for public works at a state and federal level. During the investigation, the DEA raided an office with the insignias "GMC" in San Antonio, Texas, the night of 22 May 2012.

In another case in the city of Monterrey, Nuevo León, on 29 May 2012, the authorities detained Eduardo Rodríguez Berlanga (La Conga), the owner of Constructora Janambres SA de CV and alleged money launderer and straw purchaser of Yarrington. He reportedly owns several ranches with over 4,940 acres (2,000 hectares), including one with an airstrip. The Mexican military also raided the houses and workplaces of Yarrington and his associates' in Ciudad Victoria and Matamoros, Tamaulipas: the properties of Cano-Martínez, the alleged money launderer; of Eduardo Rodríguez Berlanga, former employee of Yarrington; and of Faruk Faterni Corcuera, associate of the ex-governor. Rodríguez de la Garza's property was raided along with Yarrington's home in the city of Matamoros. In another incident early in the morning on 30 May 2012 in the border city of Reynosa, Tamaulipas, several banners appeared throughout the city blaming Francisco García Cabeza de Vaca, the former mayor of Reynosa and current candidate for the Senate, for being one of Yarrington's associates. The banner linked Cabeza de Vaca with other people who are investigated by the U.S. authorities for money laundering, including Manuel Bribiesca and Antonio Peña Argüelles. The banners also stated that Yarrington helped Cabeza de Vaca become mayor of Reynosa. In addition, Cabeza de Vaca is believed to have favored Cano Martinez's construction companies during his time as mayor; Peña Argüelles declared in front of the U.S. authorities that he had a close connection with the mayor. The National Action Party (PAN), however, claimed that the banners were put up by the Institutional Revolutionary Party (PRI) because Cabeza de Vaca (the PAN candidate for the Senate) is leading the elections and above Manuel Cavazos Lerma, a member of the PRI who is also running for a seat in the Senate too.

=== Suspension from the PRI ===
Following the accusations he is facing for allegedly accepting bribes from the Gulf Cartel during his time as governor, Yarrington was suspended from the Institutional Revolutionary Party (PRI) on 23 May 2012. He will remain suspended from the party until all the accusations against him are cleared up. The PRI distanced itself from Yarrington and said that it will not defend a former governor accused of accepting millions of dollars in bribes from drug trafficking organizations. Below is the statement issued by the PRI, translated from Spanish:

The PRI calls upon Mr. Yarrington to fully cooperate with the appropriate authorities to clear up the acts of which he is accused. Mr. Yarrington should face his personal responsibility ... Where illegal acts are proven, the law should be fully applied.

— Institutional Revolutionary Party (PRI)

The Los Angeles Times states that these drug trafficking charges may "summon the ghosts" of the PRI's corrupt and dark past. It may remind the Mexican voters of the grafts that marked the party's rule before it was tossed from the presidency in the year 2000 after seven decades of near-absolute regime control. The PRI's rule – which lasted for 71 years – was seen as "tainted by corruption," and critics have accused the PRI of making deals with the cartels to maintain peace in the country. Mexico's vast criminal underworld and illegal drug trafficking industry took hold during the reign of the PRI, often with the help of corrupt officials.

=== SIEDO investigations ===
According to the investigations of the SIEDO, Yarrington received more than US$8.5 million from the Gulf Cartel and the Juárez Cartel in eleven separate payments to finance his campaign for governor of Tamaulipas in 1998. The agency report, issued on 1 August 2012, indicates that a political campaign manager of the Institutional Revolutionary Party (PRI) personally met with several cartel leaders because they "needed the money". In exchange, the drug trafficking organizations received protection from Tamaulipas's police.

== Arrest and conviction ==
A Mexican judge ordered Yarrington's arrest on 29 August 2012; the Interpol was searching his whereabouts in over 150 countries. He was finally arrested in Florence, Italy, on 9 April 2017.

Yarrington pled guilty to money laundering and accepting bribes as governor on 26 March 2021. Ten other charges, related to drug trafficking, were dismissed. Yarrington can be sentenced to between eight and eleven years in prison, and his condominium in South Padre Island, Texas, was seized.

== Personal life ==
Yarrington was born in Matamoros, Tamaulipas. He is married to María Antonieta Morales and has two children: María Antonieta and Tomás Antonio. In addition, during Yarrington's time as mayor of Matamoros, Tamaulipas, he developed a close friendship with George W. Bush, former governor of Texas and ex-president of the United States.

Political offices
Preceded by Manuel Cavazos Lerma	Governor of Tamaulipas; 1999–2005	Succeeded by Eugenio Hernández Flores
