= Almaraz (surname) =

Almaraz is a surname. Notable people with the surname include:

- Carlos Almaraz (1941–1989), Mexican-American artist
- Bárbara Almaraz (born 1979), Mexican women's international footballer
- Enrique Almaraz y Santos (1847–1922), cardinal of the Roman Catholic Church, Archbishop of Seville and Archbishop of Toledo
- Johnny Almaraz (born 1965), American baseball director of amateur scouting for the Philadelphia Phillies
- Óscar Almaraz Smer (1968–2025), Mexican politician

== See also ==
- Almaraz, a town in Cáceres Province, Extremadura, Spain
- Almaraz de Duero, a municipality in the province of Zamora, Castile and León, Spain
- Rowland Hill, 1st Viscount Hill, first raised to peerage in 1814 as Baron Hill of Almaraz and of Hawkestone in the county of Salop
- Abel Almarez (1941–2021), Argentine boxer
