= Manuel Cavazos Lerma =

Mexican politician

Governor of Tamaulipas
- In office 1993–1999
- Preceded by: Américo Villarreal Guerra
- Succeeded by: Tomás Yarrington

Personal details
- Born: 12 March 1946 (age 80) Matamoros, Tamaulipas, Mexico
- Party: PRI
- Profession: Economist, politician

Manuel Cavazos Lerma (born 12 March 1946) is a Mexican politician and economist from the Institutional Revolutionary Party (PRI) who served as governor of Tamaulipas from 1993–1999.

== Biography ==
Cavazos Lerma was born in Matamoros, Tamaulipas, on 12 March 1946 to Manuel Cavazos Rodríguez and Clara Lerma Sánchez. He studied economics at the Monterrey Institute of Technology and Higher Education (1963–1968), where he later served as a professor.

== Political career ==
He joined the Institutional Revolutionary Party (PRI) in 1972, where he formed part of the representative in the states of Tamaulipas and Durango for the PRI. He was president of the Nacional Committee League for Revolutionary Economists (1982–1984), and served as the delegate for the PRI in the states of San Luis Potosí, Baja California, Coahuila, Jalisco and Yucatán.

In addition to governor, he served in the Chamber of Deputies for Tamaulipas's 8th district during the 52nd and 54th sessions of Congress (1982–1985 and 1988–1991). He was also a Senator.

== Organized crime allegations ==
On 30 January 2012, the Attorney General of Mexico issued a communiqué ordering the past three governors of Tamaulipas—Manuel Cavazos Lerma, Eugenio Hernández Flores, and Tomás Yarrington—to remain in the country because they were being investigated for possible ties with the Mexican drug cartels. The U.S. DEA has already accused Yarrington of laundering money for Los Zetas and the Gulf Cartel from 1999 to 2004, his time as governor.

The cousin of the ex-governor, Gilberto Lerma Plata, was arrested on the McAllen–Hidalgo–Reynosa International Bridge on 12 April 2012 by federal agents for alleged drug conspiracy. Lerma Plata was police commander in Tamaulipas who was reported in 2002 as a Gulf Cartel member who used his police ties to share information on authorities' movements to help the cartel.

Political offices
Preceded by Américo Villarreal Guerra	Governor of Tamaulipas; 1993–1999	Succeeded by Tomás Yarrington
