= Morelos Jaime Canseco Gómez =

Mexican politician

- Born: 22 September 1957 (age 68); Mexico City, Mexico
- Occupation: Politician
- Political party: PRI

Morelos Jaime Carlos Canseco Gómez (born 22 September 1957) is a Mexican politician from the Institutional Revolutionary Party (PRI). From 2010 to 2012, during the 60th session of Congress, he represented Tamaulipas's 5th district as the alternate of Rodolfo Torre Cantú, who was assassinated on 28 June 2010.
