= Óscar Luebbert =

Mayor of Reynosa

Óscar Luebbert Gutiérrez
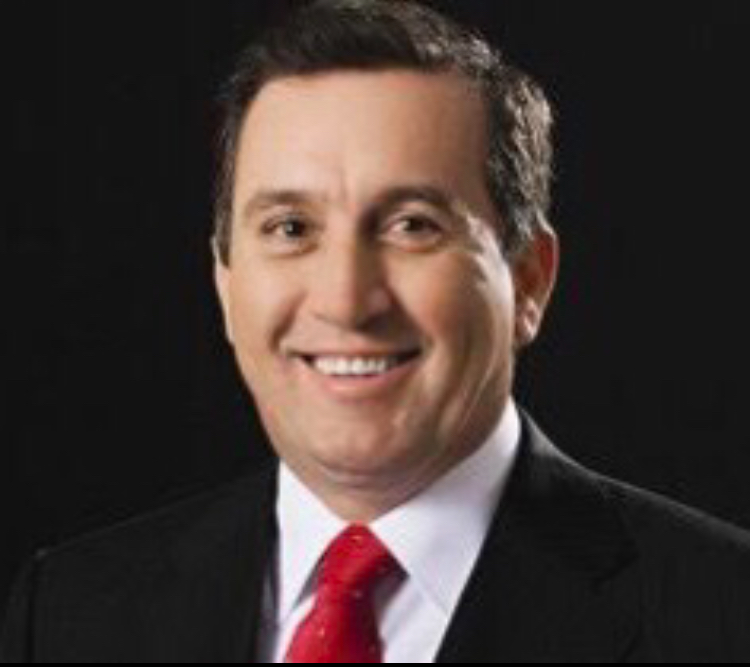

Mayor of Reynosa
- In office 1 January 2008 – 31 December 2010
- Preceded by: Miguel Ángel Villarreal Ongay
- Succeeded by: Everardo Villarreal Salinas
- In office 1 January 1996 – 31 December 1998
- Preceded by: Rigoberto Armando Garza Cantú
- Succeeded by: Luis Gerardo Higareda Adam

Personal details
- Born: 24 December 1956 (age 69) Reynosa, Tamaulipas, Mexico
- Party: PRI
- Spouse: María Esther Camargo Félix

Óscar Luebbert Gutiérrez (born 24 December 1956) is a Mexican politician affiliated with the Institutional Revolutionary Party (PRI).

He served as a senator for Tamaulipas during the 58th and 59th sessions of Congress (2000–2006). He served twice as municipal president of Reynosa: from 1996 to 1998, and from 2008 to 2010. He also served in the Chamber of Deputies for Tamaulipas's 2nd district during the 55th session of Congress (1991–1994).

Preceded by	Municipal President of Reynosa, Tamaulipas; 1996 - 1998	Succeeded by
