= List of municipal presidents of Reynosa =

The following is a list of municipal presidents of Reynosa Municipality in Tamaulipas state, Mexico. The municipality includes the city of Reynosa.

== List of officials ==
- José Cruz Contreras, 1961-1963
- Fidel Treviño González, 1962-1964
- Manuel Tarrega Guevara, 1965-1967
- Rodolfo Garza Cantú, 1968-1970
- Rafael Sierra Cantú, 1971-1973
- Manuel Garza González, 1972-1974
- Romeo Flores Salinas, 1975-1977
- Ernesto Gómez Lira, 1978-1980
- Enfrían Martínez Rendón, 1981-1983
- Miguel Valdez Revilla, 1984-1986
- Ernesto Gómez Lira, 1987-1989
- Ramón Pérez García, 1990-1992
- Rigoberto Armando Garza Cantú, 1993-1995
- Oscar Luebbert Gutiérrez, 1996-1998, 2008-2010
- Luis Gerardo Higareda Adam, 1999-1999
- Humberto Valdez Richaud, 1999-2001
- Serapio Cantú Barragán, 2002-2004
- Francisco Javier García Cabeza de Vaca, 2005-2007
- Miguel Angel Villarreal Ongay 2007-2007
- Everardo Villarreal Salinas 2011-2013
- José Elias Leal, 2013-2016
- Maki Esther Ortiz, 2016-2021
- Carlos Víctor Peña Ortiz, 2021-2022
- José Alfonso Peña Rodríguez, 2022-

== See also ==
- Reynosa state election, 2018
- Reynosa history
- List of presidents of Reynosa Municipality (in Spanish)
