= 2nd federal electoral district of Tamaulipas =

Federal electoral district of Mexico

Tamaulipas's 2nd
- Electoral district of the Chamber of Deputies of Mexico

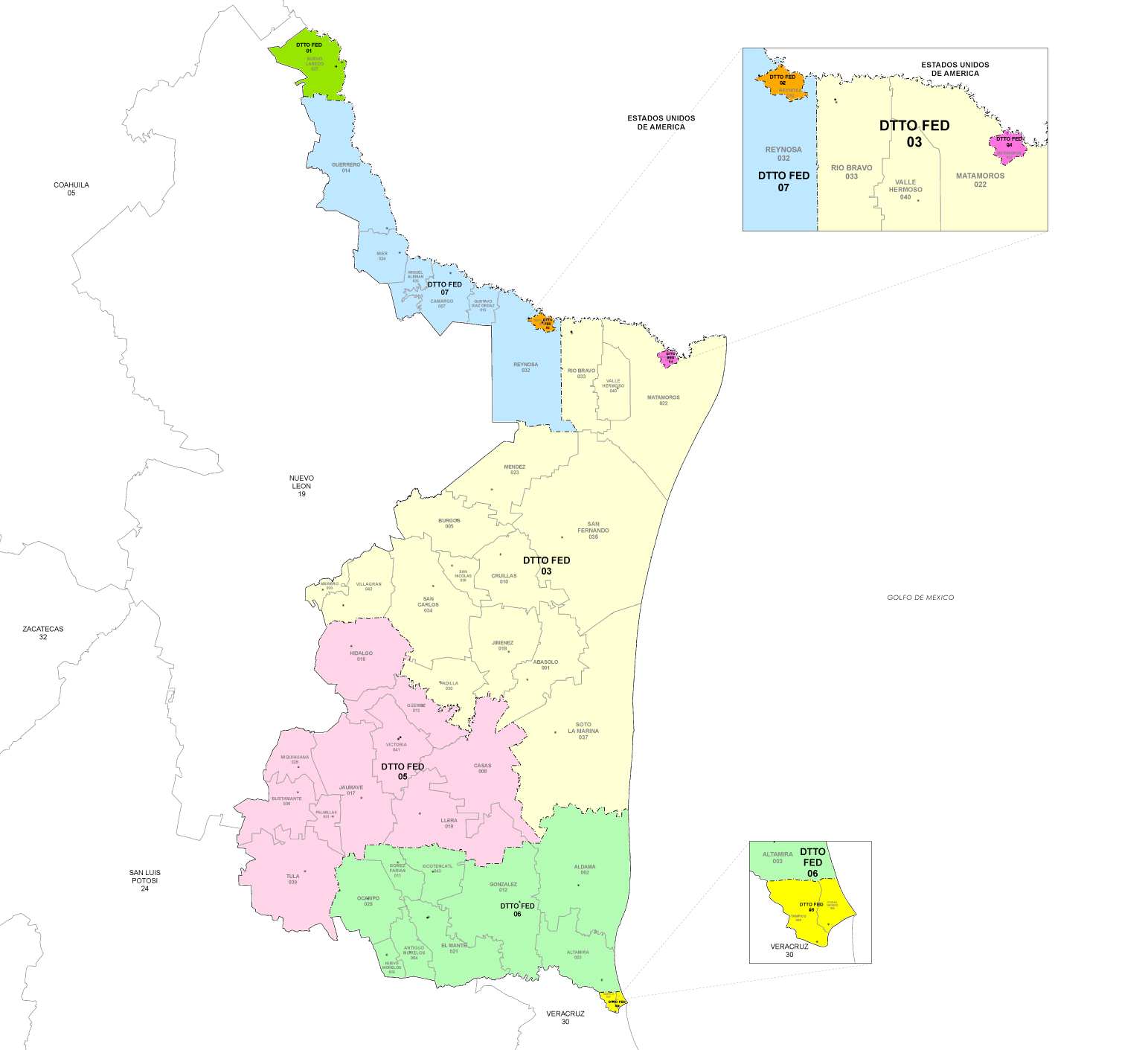
- 2nd district since 2023

Incumbent
- Member: Claudia Hernández Sáenz
- Party: ▌Morena
- Congress: 66th (2024–2027)

District
- State: Tamaulipas
- Head town: Reynosa
- Coordinates: 26°05′N 98°17′W
- Covers: Municipality of Reynosa (part)
- PR region: Second
- Precincts: 259
- Population: 389,517 (2020 census)

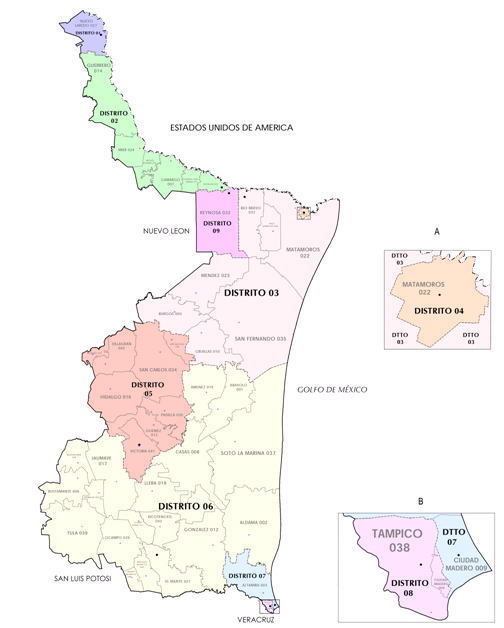
Tamaulipas's districts in 2017–2022

The 2nd federal electoral district of Tamaulipas (Spanish: Distrito electoral federal 02 de Tamaulipas) is one of the 300 electoral districts into which Mexico is divided for elections to the federal Chamber of Deputies and one of eight such districts in the state of Tamaulipas.

It elects one deputy to the lower house of Congress for each three-year legislative session by means of the first-past-the-post system. Votes cast in the district also count towards the calculation of proportional representation ("plurinominal") deputies elected from the second region.

The current member for the district, elected in the 2024 general election, is Claudia Alejandra Hernández Sáenz of the National Regeneration Movement (Morena).

== District territory ==
Tamaulipas lost a district in the 2023 districting plan adopted by the National Electoral Institute (INE), which is to be used for the 2024, 2027 and 2030 federal elections. The reconfigured 2nd district covers the 259 electoral precincts (secciones electorales) that make up the urban core of the municipality of Reynosa. (Note: The 7th district covers the remainder of the municipality.)

The head town (cabecera distrital), where results from individual polling stations are gathered together and tallied, is the city of Reynosa. The district reported a population of 389,517 in the 2020 census.

== Previous districting schemes ==
Evolution of electoral district numbers
	1974	1978	1996	2005	2017	2023
Tamaulipas	6	9	8	8	9	8
Chamber of Deputies	196	300				

2017–2022

Between 2017 and 2022, Tamaulipas accounted for nine single-member congressional seats. The 2nd district's head town was at Reynosa and it covered six of the state's 43 municipalities:
- Camargo, Guerrero, Gustavo Díaz Ordaz, Mier, Miguel Alemán and 181 precincts in the north of Reynosa (the remaining 221 precincts were assigned to the 9th district).

2005–2017

Under the 2005 plan, Tamaulipas had eight districts. This district's head town was at Reynosa and it covered 173 precincts in the north of its municipality, with the remainder assigned to the 3rd district.

1996–2005

In the 1996 scheme, under which Tamaulipas lost a single-member seat, the district comprised the whole of the municipality of Reynosa.

1978–1996

The districting scheme in force from 1978 to 1996 was the result of the 1977 electoral reforms, which increased the number of single-member seats in the Chamber of Deputies from 196 to 300. Under that plan, Tamaulipas's seat allocation rose from six to nine. The 2nd district's head town was at Reynosa and it covered portions of the city and its surrounding municipality, together with the municipalities of Camargo, Guerrero, Gustavo Díaz Ordaz, Mier and Miguel Alemán.

== Deputies returned to Congress ==
(Mexico) National parties
- Current
- PAN
- PRI
- PT
- PVEM
- MC
- Morena
- PAZ
- Somos
- Defunct or local only
- PLM
- PNR
- PRM
- PNM
- PP
- PPS
- PARM
- PFCRN
- CON
- PANAL
- PSD
- PES
- PES
- PRD

Tamaulipas's 2nd district
Election	Deputy	Party	Term	Legislature
1916	Zeferino Fajardo		1916–1917	Constituent Congress of Querétaro
...
1976	Óscar Mario Santos Gómez	Institutional Revolutionary Party	1976–1979	50th Congress
1979	Ernesto Donato Cerda Ramírez	Institutional Revolutionary Party	1979–1982	51st Congress
1982	Federico Hernández Cortés	Institutional Revolutionary Party	1982–1985	52nd Congress
1985	Emilio Jorge García Cordero	Institutional Revolutionary Party	1985–1988	53rd Congress
1988	Jorge Constantino Barba Islas	Institutional Revolutionary Party	1988–1991	54th Congress
1991	Óscar Luebbert Gutiérrez	Institutional Revolutionary Party	1991–1994	55th Congress
1994	Eliezar García Sáenz	Institutional Revolutionary Party	1994–1997	56th Congress
1997	Rigoberto Armando Garza Cantú	Institutional Revolutionary Party	1997–2000	57th Congress
2000	Francisco Javier García Cabeza de Vaca	National Action Party (Mexico)	2000–2003	58th Congress
2003	Maki Esther Ortiz Domínguez	National Action Party (Mexico)	2003–2006	59th Congress
2006	Raúl García Vivian	National Action Party (Mexico)	2006–2009	60th Congress
2009	Jesús Everardo Villarreal Salinas	National Action Party (Mexico)	2009–2012	61st Congress
2012	Humberto Armando Prieto Herrera	National Action Party (Mexico)	2012–2015	62nd Congress
2015	María Esther Camargo Félix	Institutional Revolutionary Party	2015–2018	63rd Congress
2018	Olga Juliana Elizondo Guerra	Labour Party (Mexico)	2018–2021	64th Congress
2021	Olga Juliana Elizondo Guerra (Note: Elizondo Guerra switched from the PT to Morena on 1 September 2021.)	Labour Party (Mexico) National Regeneration Movement	2021–2024	65th Congress
2024	Claudia Alejandra Hernández Sáenz	National Regeneration Movement	2024–2027	66th Congress

== Presidential elections ==
Tamaulipas's 2nd district
Election	District won by	Party or coalition	%
2018	Andrés Manuel López Obrador	Juntos Haremos Historia	51.8807
2024	Claudia Sheinbaum Pardo	Sigamos Haciendo Historia	67.4733
