= José Julián Sacramento =

Mexican politician

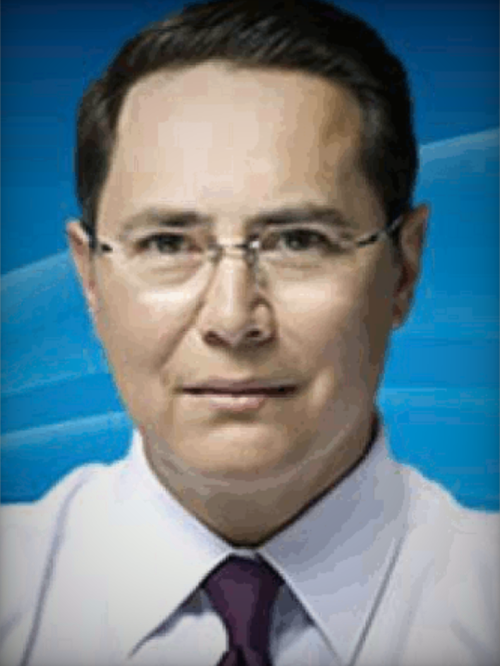
- José Julián Sacramento Garza
- Born: 21 August 1956 (age 69); Matamoros, Tamaulipas, Mexico
- Education: UANL
- Occupations: Senator and Deputy
- Political party: PAN

José Julián Sacramento Garza (born 21 August 1956) is a Mexican politician affiliated with the PAN. He served as Deputy of the LIX Legislature of the Mexican Congress representing Tamaulipas. He also served as Senator during the LX and LXI Legislatures and was nominated as candidate for Governor of Tamaulipas.
