= Humberto Prieto Herrera =

Mexican politician

- Born: 6 August 1985 (age 40); Hermosillo, Sonora, Mexico
- Occupation: Politician
- Political party: PAN
- Website: http://humbertoprieto.net/

Humberto Armando Prieto Herrera (born 6 August 1985) is a Mexican politician affiliated with the National Action Party (PAN). In the 2012 general election, he was elected to the Chamber of Deputies to represent Tamaulipas's 2nd district during the 62nd session of Congress.
