= Raúl García Vivián =

Mexican politician

- Born: 3 June 1961 (age 65); Tamaulipas, Mexico
- Education: Universidad Valle del Bravo
- Occupation: Politician
- Political party: PAN

Raúl García Vivián (born 3 June 1961) is a Mexican politician from the National Action Party (PAN). In the 2006 general election, he was elected to the Chamber of Deputies to represent Tamaulipas's 2nd district during the 60th session of Congress.
