= Maki Esther Ortiz =

Mayor of Reynosa

Maki Esther Ortiz Domínguez
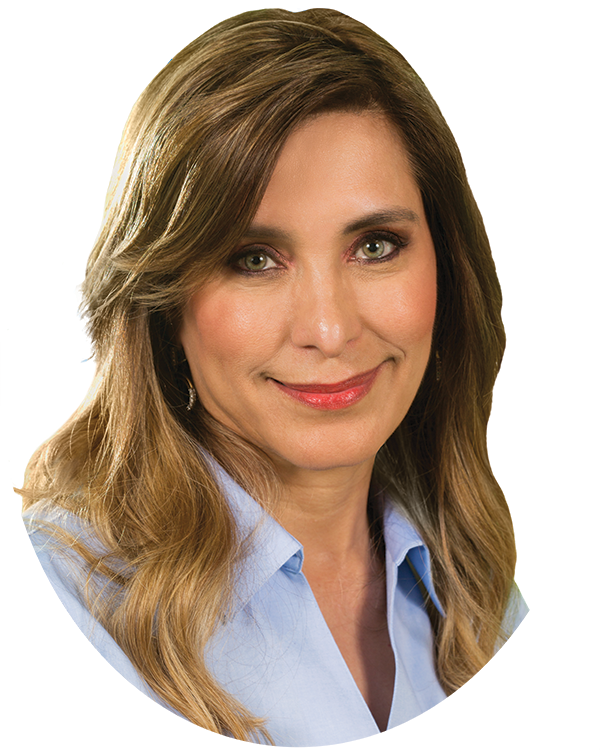

Municipal president of Reynosa
- In office 1 October 2016 – 30 September 2021
- Preceded by: Jose Elias Leal
- Succeeded by: Carlos Víctor Peña Ortiz

Senator for Tamaulipas
- In office 1 September 2012 – 4 February 2016
- Preceded by: Nelly Gonzalez Aguilar
- Succeeded by: Andrea Garcia Garcia

Personal details
- Born: 23 September 1962 (age 62); Reynosa, Tamaulipas, Mexico
- Political party: PAN (until 2021)
- Spouse: Carlos Peña Garza
- Children: Carlos Victor Peña Ortiz
- Profession: doctor and politician

Maki Esther Ortiz Domínguez (born 23 September 1962) is a Mexican politician. At different times she has been affiliated to both the National Action Party (PAN) and the Ecologist Green Party of Mexico (PVEM).

She served as mayor of Reynosa from 2016 to 2021, the first woman in the history of the city elected to the position. She also became the first mayoress to be re-elected for a consecutive second term. She served as a senator for Tamaulipas in the 62nd Congress (2012 to 2015). She also served as a federal deputy during the 59th Congress (2003 to 2006), for Tamaulipas's 2nd district.

Ortiz Domínguez sought election as one of Tamaulipas's senators in the 2024 Senate election, occupying the second place on the Ecologist Green Party of Mexico's two-name formula. She failed to win the seat.

== See also ==
- List of presidents of Reynosa Municipality
