= Victoria Municipality, Tamaulipas =

Coordinates: 23.7584°N 99.1349°W

Victoria
- Municipality
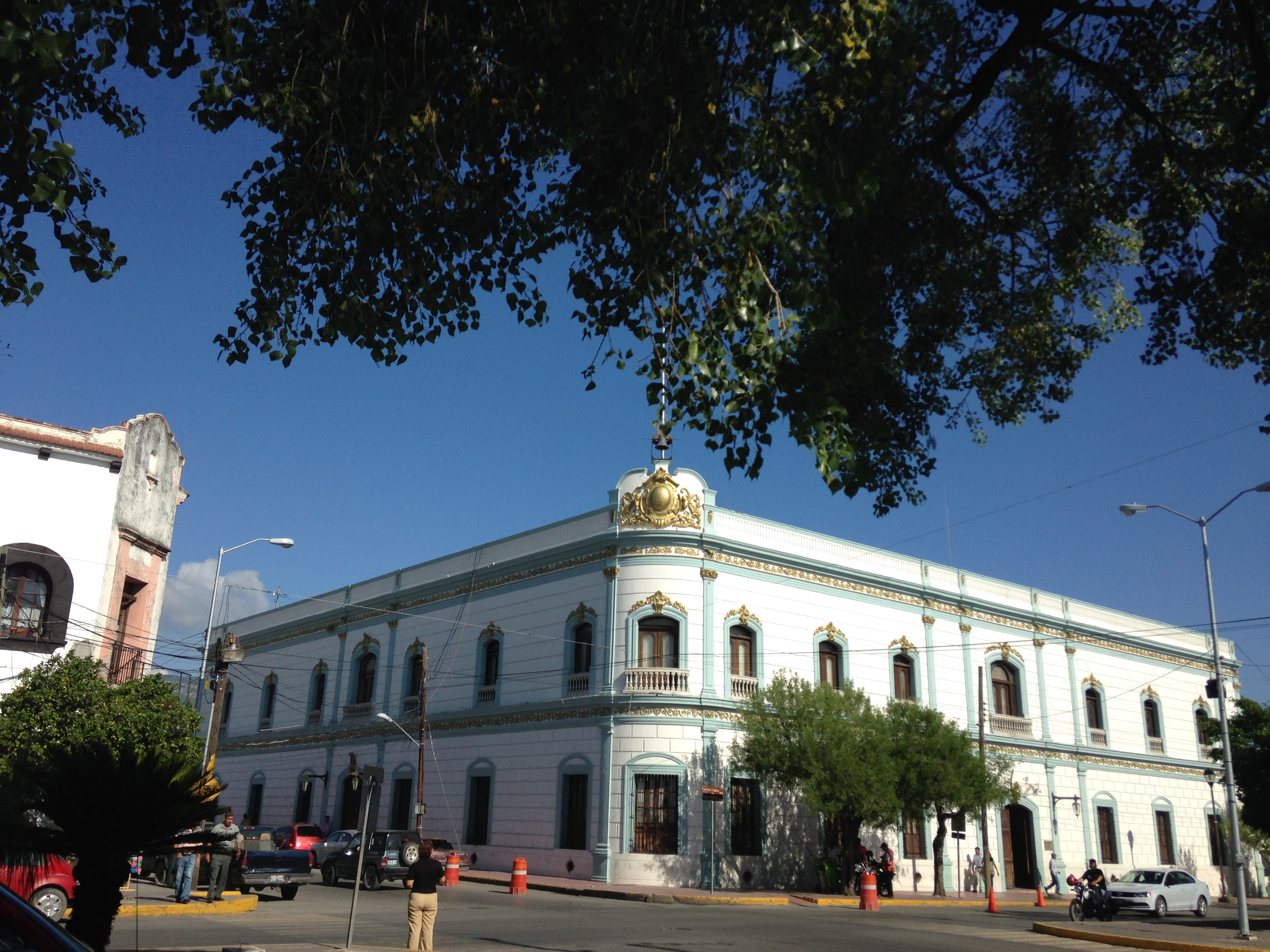
- Town hall

- Coat of arms

- Location in Mexico Victoria (Mexico)
- Country: Mexico
- State: Tamaulipas
- Demonym: (in Spanish)
- Time zone: UTC−06:00 (Zona Centro)

Victoria Municipality is a municipality located in the Mexican state of Tamaulipas. Its municipal seat is Ciudad Victoria.

== Municipal presidents ==
Municipal president	Term	Political party	Notes
Antonio Govela	1848		
Manuel Castillo	1853		
Cipriano Rangel	1878		
Antonio Fernández	1884		
Ignacio Martínez	1885		
Ascensión Gil	1888		
Antonio Fernández	1889		
Francisco Hernández	1890		
Antonio Fernández	1891		
Francisco Terán	1892		
Manuel J. Solórzano	1893–1894		
N/A	1895		
Francisco Terán	1896		
Juan Terán	1896		
Francisco Terán	1897		
Leopoldo Zorrilla	1899		
Carlos Govea	1900		
Carlos Collado	1900		
Carlos Govea	1901		
Vicente García Lazo	1902		
Antonio Fernández	1905–1907		
José Ángel Castillo	1908		
José Pier	1908		
José Ángel Castillo	1909		
José Pier	1909		
José Ángel Castillo	1910		
José Pier	1910		
José Pier	1911		
Antonio P. Castro	1912		
Cipriano Guerra Espinoza	–		
Rudecindo Montemayor	1913		
Maclovio M. Sierra	1914		
Jesús Cárdenas	1915		
Zenón Araujo	1916		
José María Garza Cantú	–		
Carlos W. Trejo	1918		
Jesús Gómez	1919		
Francisco González	1920–1921		
Juan Antonio Flores	–		
Juan Antonio Flores	1922		
Antonio P. Castro	1923		
Epigmenio García	1924		
Fernando Gómez	–		
Arnulfo Martínez	1925		
Leoncio Torres	1926		
Epigmenio García	1927		
Fernando Gómez	1928		
Carlos A. Montemayor	1929–1930	PNR	
Fernando Gómez	1931–1932	PNR	
Manuel Gómez Garza	1933–1934	PNR	
Melitón Rodríguez	1935–1936	PNR	
Bernardino Rodríguez	1937–1938	PNR	
Bernardo Turrubiates	1939–1940	PRM	
Lorenzo García	1941–1942	PRM	
José Martínez y Martínez	1943–1945	PRM	
Brígido Anaya	1946	PRM	
Donato Saldívar	1946–1948	PRI	
Jesús Ramírez Masías	01-01-1949–31-12-1951	PRI	
Fernando Montemayor de la Garza	01-01-1952–31-12-1954	PRI	
Gerónimo Rodríguez Castillo	01-01-1955–31-12-1957	PRI	
Carlos Canales Flores	01-01-1958–31-12-1960	PRI	
Arsenio Saeb Félix	1961–1962	PRI	
Carlos Quintanilla Meléndez	01-01-1963–31-12-1965	PRI	
Jesús Ramírez Masías	01-01-1966–31-12-1968	PRI	
Enrique Cárdenas González	01-01-1969–1971	PRI	
Rogelio Terán Medina	–	PRI	
Roberto Perales Meléndez	1972–31-12-1974	PRI	
Magdaleno Mata Blanco	01-01-1975–31-12-1977	PRI	
Bladimir Joch González	01-01-1978–31-12-1980	PRI	
Raúl García García	01-01-1981–31-12-1983	PRI	
Jaime Rodríguez Inurrigarro	01-01-1984–31-12-1986	PRI	
Tito Reséndez Treviño	01-01-1987–31-12-1989	PRI	
Ramón Durón Ruiz	01-01-1990–31-12-1992	PRI	
Gustavo Adolfo Cárdenas Gutiérrez	01-01-1993–31-12-1995	PRI	
Pascual Ruiz García	01-01-1996–31-12-1998	PRI	
Enrique Cárdenas del Avellano	01-01-1999–27-09-2000	PRI	Applied for a leave
Egidio Torre Cantú	28-09-2000–31-12-2001	PRI	Acting municipal president
Eugenio Javier Hernández Flores	01-01-2002–31-12-2004	PRI	
Álvaro Guadalupe	01-01-2005–31-12-2007	PRI	
Arturo Diez Gutiérrez Navarro	01-01-2008–31-12-2010	PRI; Panal	
Miguel Ángel González Salum	01-01-2011–2013	PRI; PVEM; Panal	
Alejandro Etienne Lland	2013–2016	PRI; PVEM; Panal	
Óscar de Jesús Almaraz Smer	2016–2018	PRI; PVEM; Panal	
Xicoténcatl González Uresti	2018–2021	PAN; PRD; MC	Coalition "For Tamaulipas to the Front"
Eduardo Abraham Gattas Báez	2021–2024	PT; Morena	
Eduardo Abraham Gattás Báez	2024–	Morena	He was reelected on 02/06/2024
