= Palmillas =

Municipality and Township in Tamaulipas state, Mexico

- Municipality and Township
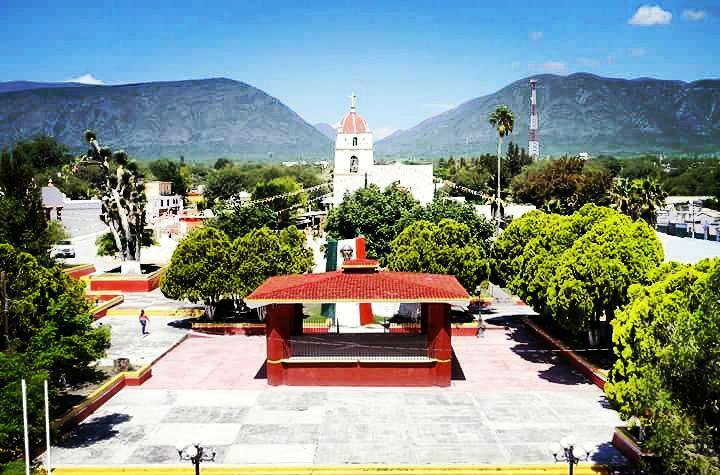

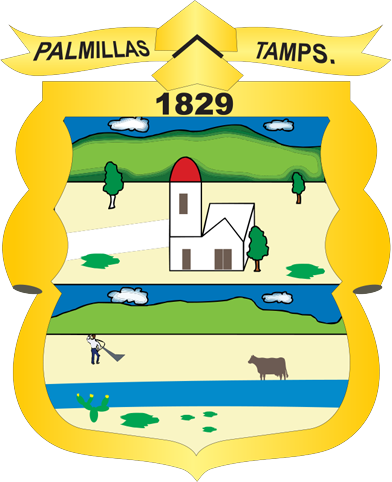
- Coat of arms

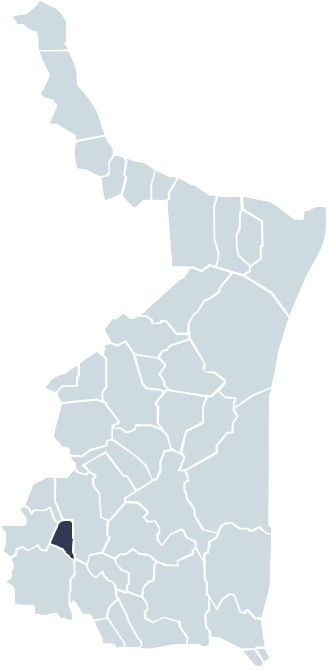
- Location of Palmillas Municipality in Tamaulipas
- Coordinates: 23°18′07″N 99°32′56″W
- Country: Mexico
- State: Tamaulipas

Government
  - Type: Mayor–council
  - Mayor: Jesús Pérez Castillo
- Elevation: 1,293 m (4,242 ft)

Population (2005)
  - Total: 1,603
- Time zone: UTC-6 (CST)

Palmillas is a historical town, township, and the municipal seat of the Palmillas Municipality in southwestern Tamaulipas, Mexico. The municipality has about five small towns including its township of the same name. According to the INEGI census in 2005, the Palmillas municipality has a total of 1,603 inhabitants.

Palmillas is the municipal seat for the surrounding ejidos in the area. The Catholic church, located beside the main plaza and is called the "Church of Our Lady of the Snows", is reported to be the oldest operational church in Tamaulipas.

== History and government ==
The establishment of the Mission Palmillas was ordered by the King Felipe IV. Palmillas was founded by Colonel Martín de Zavala in 1627. The Mission was also known as "Real de Palmillas". In 1747, Real de Palmillas was rechartered as a villa. The mayor is Jesús Pérez Castillo.

== Geography ==
Villa de Palmillas has an altitude of 1,293 meters (4,242 feet) above sea level. The municipality has a land area of 484.71 square kilometers (5.2174×10^{9} square feet)mi). Mountains and hills cover 92% of its landscape.
