= Miguel Ángel González Salum =

Mexican politician

- Born: 8 December 1967 (age 58); Tamaulipas, Mexico
- Occupation: Politician
- Political party: PRI

Miguel Ángel González Salum (Note: In this Mexican name, the surname is González and the second or maternal family name is Salum.) (born 8 December 1967) is a Mexican politician from the Institutional Revolutionary Party (PRI). He has been elected twice to the Chamber of Deputies for Tamaulipas's 5th district, centered on Ciudad Victoria.

== Life ==
González attended Tec de Monterrey and graduated from the school with a degree in accounting in 1988. In the early 1990s, he was involved in several business ventures, such as Mirasierra Desarrollos, S.A. de C.V., and Corporativo Empresarial Victoria, S.A. de C.V. In 1990, he joined the local chamber of commerce (CANACO) of Ciudad Victoria, which he presided between 1999 and 2000.

In 1996, González began serving a two-year term on the city council of Ciudad Victoria, which ended in 1998. He returned to political life in 2001, when he was tapped to head the finance committee of the municipal branch of the PRI in Victoria; the next year, he became the general manager of the city's Municipal Drinking Water and Sanitation Commission.

Between 2006 and 2009, González served his first term as a legislator, in the Chamber of Deputies for the 60th session of Congress. He presided over the Special Commission for the Cuenca de Burgos Region, and he also sat on commissions dealing with Finances and Public Credit, Communications, and Economy. Simultaneously, between 2008 and 2010, he became the general secretary of the Confederación Nacional de Organizaciones Populares in Tamaulipas.

Voters in Ciudad Victoria elected González Salum to the municipal presidency of the city for a term running between 2011 and 2013. Between January 2014 and January 2015, he served as the state's finance secretary, his first post in the state government; he resigned in order to run for the Chamber of Deputies. He won the district at the 7 June elections with 15,000 more votes than the closest competitor, from Movimiento Ciudadano. While he began his second term in San Lázaro sitting on the Finances and Public Credit, Municipal Development, and Housing Commissions, he dropped Housing to move to the Economy Commission on 21 October 2015. Additionally, on 5 May 2016, González Salum was named president of a special commission on the social and economic development of the northern border.
