= Salum =

Salum may refer to:

- Salum, Argyll and Bute, a location in Scotland
- Sallum or As Sallum, a harbour city in Egypt, near the border to Libya
- Saloum, a former kingdom in present-day Senegal
- Salum Air Base, a former Iraqi Air Force base in the Diyala Governorate of Iraq

== People with the name ==
- Ikaji Salum (born 1967), Tanzanian long-distance runner
- Marco Antonio Salum, Chilean politician
- Salvador Alejandro César Nasralla Salum, Honduran politician
- Salum Swedi (born 1980), Tanzanian footballer
