= Amigos de Fox =

Civil organization of support of Vicente Fox as the President of Mexico

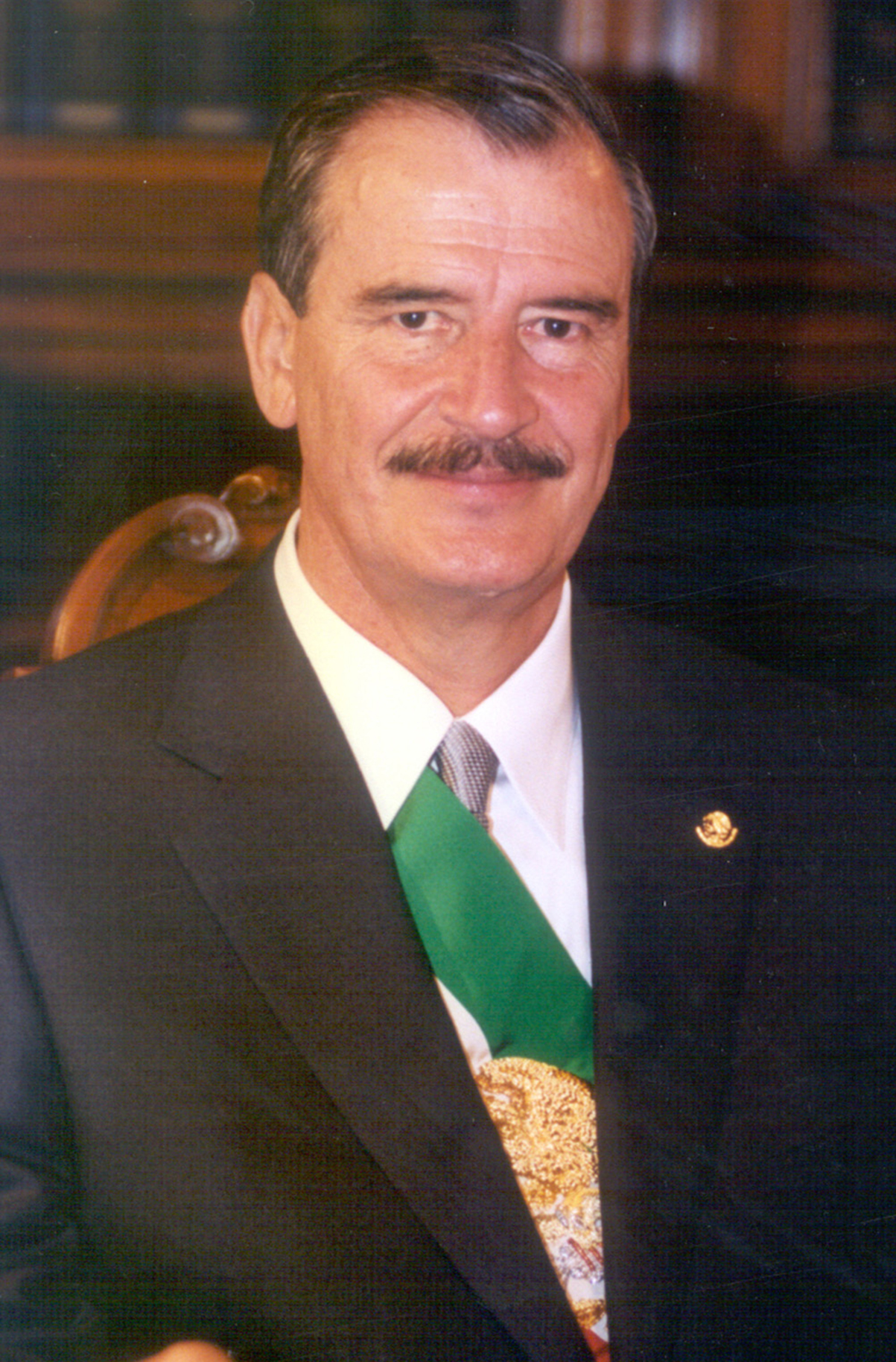
Vicente Fox in his official presidential portrait, 2000

Amigos de Fox was the name of the civil organization of support of Vicente Fox as the President of Mexico. This organization was created in 1999 by the late José Luis González González (a.k.a. "El Bigotón", Spanish: "Big-mustached"), a businessman friend of Fox, and former employee of Coca-Cola-Mexico, like Fox.

After the election and during the government of Vicente Fox (2000–06) different groups have expressed concern on the management of the funds that the organization gathered. Lino Korrodi, financial manager, and Carlota Robinson were accused of triangulation of funds to the organization. After a citizen requested the Specialized Attorney for the Attention of Electoral Crimes (FEPADE) of the office of the Attorney General (PGR) this was denied. The PGR declare it would reserve the information for 12 years because releasing it would jeopardize the life, security and health of the people involved with the organization. In response to this the Federal Institute of Access to Information (IFAI) has instructed the PGR to disclose the information.
