= Enrique Cárdenas González =

Mexican politician

Governor of Tamaulipas
- In office January 1, 1975 – December 31, 1980
- Preceded by: Manuel A. Ravize
- Succeeded by: Emilio Martínez Manatou

Municipal president of Victoria
- In office 1969–1970
- Preceded by: Jesús Ramírez Massías
- Succeeded by: Rogelio Terán Medina

Personal details
- Born: February 4, 1927 Ciudad Victoria, Tamaulipas, Mexico
- Died: March 1, 2018 (aged 91) Ciudad Victoria, Tamaulipas
- Party: Institutional Revolutionary Party
- Spouse: Bertha del Avellano
- Children: Laura; José; Enrique Cárdenas del Avellano; Eduardo; Alejandro; Bertha

Enrique Cárdenas González (February 4, 1927 – March 1, 2018) was a Mexican politician and a member of the Institutional Revolutionary Party (PRI). He served as Governor of Tamaulipas from 1975 to 1981 and Municipal President of Ciudad Victoria from 1968 until 1971. Nationally, Cárdenas served in the Senate of the Republic for two terms, as well as Undersecretary of Finance during the administration of President Luis Echeverría during the 1970s.

== Life ==
Cárdenas was born in Ciudad Victoria, Tamaulipas, on February 4, 1927. In the 1950s, he began his business career selling cars in Tampico and later moved to Matamoros, where he sold and repaired farm implements.

His brother Jorge started a radio station, XEGW, in Ciudad Victoria in 1957. Ultimately, after working as one of its sales agents, Enrique acquired XEGW from his brother. In 1969, Cárdenas started Organización Radiofónica Tamaulipeca, which continues to operate radio stations in Ciudad Victoria and Ciudad Mante. Separately from ORT, he also was the original owner of XEIR radio in Ciudad Valles, San Luis Potosí.

In 1963, Cárdenas entered politics. His cousin, Morelos Jaime Canseco González, was critical in promoting him to the head of the state electoral commission. When Gustavo Díaz Ordaz left the Federal Electoral Commission to run for president, Luis Echeverría took his place, starting a friendship that would catalyze Cárdenas's political career. In 1968, with Echeverría as Secretary of the Interior, he intervened to have Cárdenas be named the mayor of Ciudad Victoria. However, he would only serve in that post for a year before being named to the first of two Senate stints.

Cárdenas promoted Tamaulipas's agricultural sector during his tenure as governor from 1975 to 1981 through his program called Revolución Verde, or Green Revolution. The initiative led to the modernization of Tamaulipas's agriculture industry, including an increase in land clearing and tillage for farming. Tamaulipas became known as one of the "granaries of Mexico" as a result of the state programs.

Enrique Cárdenas died at his home in Ciudad Victoria at 3:00 a.m. on March 1, 2018, at the age of 91. He was survived by his wife, Bertha del Avellano, the former First Lady of Tamaulipas, and their five children - Laura, José, Enrique Cárdenas del Avellano (PRI politician), Eduardo, and Alejandro.
