= Johnny Almaraz =

American baseball player

Johnny Bishop Almaraz (born September 1, 1965) is an American baseball figure who was the Philadelphia Phillies director of amateur scouting, having previously replaced Marti Wolever. Almaraz is considered by some as "one of the most prolific talent evaluators in baseball."

It was announced, late in the 2019 season, that Almaraz would step down for personal reasons, but remain with the Phillies organization. He was subsequently replaced by Brian Barber.

Before joining the Phillies system, he served as the Atlanta Braves director of Latin American operations for three years and the team's director of international scouting and operations for four. Prior to that, he was the Cincinnati Reds director of player personnel and director of player development. He also pitched for a year in the Reds system, having been taken by the club in the 14th round of the 1988 Major League Baseball draft, one pick ahead of future National Football League player Rodney Peete and a few picks ahead of pitcher Victor Cole. He played for the Billings Mustangs, winning five games.

Players he signed include Johnny Cueto, Julio Teherán, Ozzie Albies, Ronald Acuña, Adam Dunn, B.J. Ryan, Paul Bako, Jason LaRue and Jose Peraza.

He attended Southwest Texas State University. His brother, Joe Almaraz, is a scout and has managed in the minor leagues; his nephew Joseph Almaraz was drafted by professional teams. He was born in San Antonio, Texas.
