= Rodolfo Torre Cantú =

Mexican physician and politician and murder victim

- Picture of Torre Cantú during his campaign

Personal details
- Born: February 14, 1964 Ciudad Victoria, Tamaulipas, Mexico
- Died: June 28, 2010 (aged 46) Ciudad Victoria, Tamaulipas, Mexico
- Party: Institutional Revolutionary Party (PRI)
- Education: Universidad Autónoma de Tamaulipas
- Profession: Physician, politician

Rodolfo Torre Cantú (February 14, 1964 – June 28, 2010) was a Mexican physician and politician. He held a number of public offices, such as federal deputy, secretary of health of Tamaulipas and director-general of the DIF (National System for Integral Family Development) in Ciudad Victoria. While running for governor of Tamaulipas as the candidate of the PRI, he was assassinated, apparently by agents of a drug cartel. Torre was murdered alongside a Tamaulipas lawmaker, Enrique Blackmore, on 28 June 2010 near Ciudad Victoria, which is approximately three hours south of the U.S. border. President Felipe Calderón promised a full investigation, saying, "the fight against drug cartels must continue". He further stated, "This was an act not only against a candidate of a political party but against democratic institutions, and it requires a united and firm response from all those who work for democracy." Torre's assassination was the "highest-profile case of political violence" in Mexico since the murder of Luis Donaldo Colosio.

In early 2012, Tomás Yarrington, the governor of Tamaulipas from 1999–2004, was accused of being involved in the slaying of Rodolfo Torre Cantú; the ambush that killed Torre Cantú was allegedly carried out by Jorge Eduardo Costilla Sánchez, the supreme leader of the Gulf Cartel.

== Personal life ==
Rodolfo Torre Cantú was born in Ciudad Victoria, Tamaulipas, the fourth of five children of Ana María Cantú and Dr. Egidio Torre López, a distinguished public servant and PRI activist. He was married to Laura Graciela de la Garza Montoto, with whom he had three children: Laura, Rodolfo, and Paulina.

== Education ==
Torre studied exclusively in institutions in his native Tamaulipas. He attended primary, secondary, and preparatory schools in Ciudad Victoria and in 1987 graduated from the school of medicine at the Autonomous University of Tamaulipas in Matamoros, gaining the title of surgeon, and served as a professor at the same institution.

== PRI activism ==
Torre was an activist of the Institutional Revolutionary Party (PRI) beginning in 1980, when he joined the National Movement of Revolutionary Youth. Within the party he participated in electoral campaigns at every level – from presidential elections to mayoral and local elections.

== Political career ==
Torre began his public service career in 1989 as medical coordinator of Banrural in Ciudad Victoria, subsequently becoming regional coordinator for medical services in San Luis Potosí, Nuevo León, and Tamaulipas. In 1999 he became director general of the municipal DIF system (integral family development) in Ciudad Victoria. In 2004 he was elected a local deputy for the fourteenth district. From 2005 to 2009 he served as secretary of health of the state of Tamaulipas, and oversaw the construction of new, modern health centers. He participated in numerous health campaigns directed at both children and adults, notably a nutritional program aimed at families of limited means.

In 2009 Torre was elected to the 61st legislature of the Chamber of Deputies for Tamaulipas's 5th district, headquartered in Ciudad Victoria and also covering the municipalities of Hidalgo, Güemez, Mainero, Padilla, San Carlos, San Nicolás and Villagrán. He received the second highest number of votes in the election.

He served as coordinator of PRI deputies from Tamaulipas and was a member of the health commission.

He proposed a reform to Article 9 of the General Law on Education with the aim of improving national educational models, pointing to Tamaulipas as a national model for the teaching of English in all primary schools.

== Candidacy for governor of Tamaulipas ==
On March 14 Torre was named PRI candidate for the governorship of Tamaulipas. On April 10 he was named candidate of Todos Tamaulipas, an electoral alliance comprising the PRI, the Ecologist Green Party of Mexico (PVEM), and the New Alliance Party (PANAL).

== Assassination ==
On the morning of June 28, 2010, while traveling to General Pedro J. Méndez International Airport to board a flight to the city of Valle Hermoso, Tamaulipas, for a campaign event, Torre was murdered along with six of those in his entourage.

The deputy for Matamoros, Baltazar Hinojosa Ochoa, and the former governor of the state of Coahuila, Enrique Martínez y Martínez, were booked to travel with Torre Cantú to the airport during the day of his assassination. Nonetheless, Hinojosa and Martínez did not attend, and it is unknown why.

== See also ==
- List of politicians killed in the Mexican drug war
