= Everardo Villarreal Salinas =

Mexican politician

- Born: 23 March 1978 (age 48); Reynosa, Tamaulipas, Mexico
- Occupation: Politician
- Political party: PRI

Jesús Everardo Villarreal Salinas (born 23 March 1978) is a Mexican politician from the Institutional Revolutionary Party (PRI). In the 2009 mid-terms, he was elected to the Chamber of Deputies to represent Tamaulipas's 2nd district during the 61st session of Congress.
