= Egidio Torre Cantú =

Mexican politician

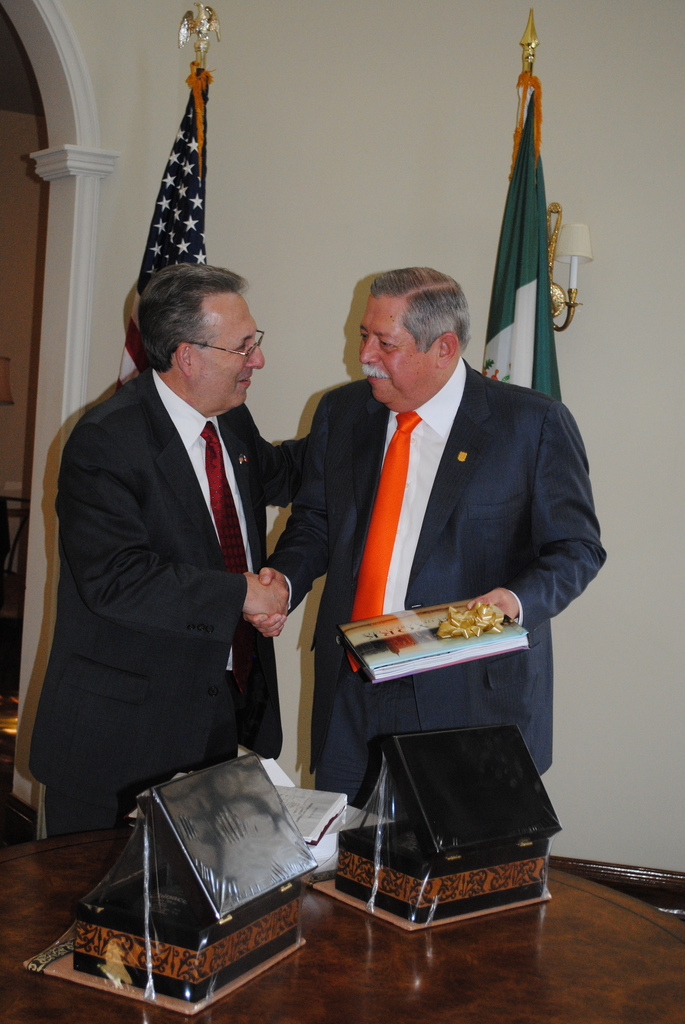
- Governor Egidio Torre Cantú (right) meets with U.S. Amb. Earl Anthony Wayne

Governor of Tamaulipas
- In office January 1, 2011 – October 1, 2016
- Preceded by: Eugenio Hernández Flores
- Succeeded by: Francisco García Cabeza de Vaca

Personal details
- Born: June 19, 1957 (age 69) Ciudad Victoria, Tamaulipas, Mexico
- Party: Institutional Revolutionary Party
- Spouse: María del Pilar González García
- Children: 4
- Education: Monterrey Institute of Technology and Higher Education; University of Texas at Austin
- Profession: Civil engineer

Egidio Torre Cantú (born June 19, 1957 in Ciudad Victoria, Tamaulipas) is a Mexican politician affiliated with the Institutional Revolutionary Party (PRI) who served as governor of Tamaulipas for the term 2011 through 2016.

== Personal life ==
Egidio Torre Cantú was born on June 19, 1957, in Ciudad Victoria, Tamaulipas, the eldest child of Egidio Torre López, a medical surgeon and distinguished public servant and PRI activist, and Ana María Cantú Leal. His younger siblings include María Eugenia, María del Consuelo, Rodolfo and Ana.

Civil engineer by profession, Egidio holds a bachelor's degree from Monterrey Institute of Technology and Higher Education and completed postgraduate studies at the University of Texas at Austin. Currently, he is the owner of a construction company by the name of Tohesa, based in Ciudad Victoria, Tamaulipas.

He is married to María del Pilar González García, with whom he had four children; María Angélica, Egidio Fernando, Emiliano and María Fernanda.

== Political career ==
From 1984 to 1987, Egidio served as Public Works Director for Ciudad Victoria and from 1987 to 1992, he served as Director of Construction for the state government of Tamaulipas. Subsequently, Egidio served in Ciudad Victoria's Board of Aldermen from 1999 to 2000 and was also temporary mayor of Ciudad Victoria from 2000 to 2001. Before being confirmed as candidate for governor, Egidio was an active political advisor of the PRI's State Committee.

== Candidacy for governor of Tamaulipas ==
On June 30, 2010, he was confirmed as candidate of Todos Tamaulipas, an electoral alliance comprising the Institutional Revolutionary Party (PRI), the Ecologist Green Party of Mexico (PVEM), and the New Alliance Party (PANAL), in substitution of his late brother, Rodolfo Torre Cantú, assassinated on June 28, 2010.

== Governor of Tamaulipas ==
On July 5, 2010, Mexican media confirmed that Egidio became virtual governor of Tamaulipas after receiving 62.9% of the votes. His closest opponent, José Julián Sacramento of the National Action Party, received 29.5% of the votes.

Political offices
Preceded by Eugenio Hernández Flores	Governor of Tamaulipas; 2011 – 2016	Succeeded by Francisco García Cabeza de Vaca
Preceded by Enrique Cárdenas del Avellano	Mayor of Ciudad Victoria; 2000 – 2001	Succeeded by Eugenio Hernández Flores
