= Eugenio Hernández Flores =

Mexican politician

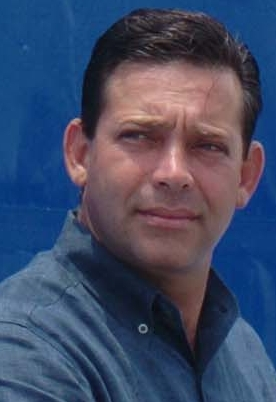

Governor of Tamaulipas
- In office January 1, 2005 – December 31, 2010
- Preceded by: Tomás Yarrington
- Succeeded by: Egidio Torre Cantú

Personal details
- Born: October 17, 1959 (age 66) Ciudad Victoria, Tamaulipas
- Party: Institutional Revolutionary Party
- Spouse: Adriana González
- Profession: Civil engineer

Eugenio Javier Hernández Flores (born October 17, 1959) is a Mexican politician affiliated with the Institutional Revolutionary Party (PRI). He was the mayor of Ciudad Victoria from 2001 to 2004 and governor of Tamaulipas from 2004 to 2010, a federal deputy from 2000 to 2001, and a coordinator of the Financial Committee of Tomás Yarrington during his campaign. On May 27, 2015, he was indicted on charges of money laundering alongside his brother-in-law Óscar Gómez Guerra by the United States Department of Justice (USDOJ).

== Personal life ==
Born in Ciudad Victoria, Tamaulipas, Hernández Flores is the fourth child of Eugenio Hernández Balboa and Susana Flores Fernández. He studied civil engineering at the Monterrey Institute of Technology and Higher Education. He is married to Adriana González de Hernández, with whom he has four children. In his early professional life he worked in the construction industry, where he became president of the Chamber of the Mexican Construction Industry and president of the municipal Water and Sewer System Commission.

== Political career ==
He joined the Institutional Revolutionary Party in 1997. In 1999, during the presidential campaign of Francisco Labastida Ochoa, Hernández Flores was appointed as state campaign coordinator in Tamaulipas. The same year he was elected as general secretary of the Directive Committee of the PRI party.

In 2000, he was elected federal deputy for Tamaulipas's 5th district. He thus served during the 58th Congress, where he was a member of the housing committee and the water resources committee. He then introduced the bill to amend of article 46 of the Housing Workers Fund Law. In that year he requested a leave of absence from Congress to stand in Ciudad Victoria's mayoral election, which he won. He took the mayor's post in 2001.

=== Tamaulipas Governor ===
In the PRI's internal election he was appointed as the candidate of that party to participate in the Tamaulipas Governor election to be run on June 26, 2004. Thus, he took part in the gubernatorial election against Gustavo Cárdenas of the PAN, Álvaro Garza Cantú of the alliance formed by the Party of the Democratic Revolution and Convergencia, and Bruno Álvarez of the Labor Party. The elections were run on November 14 and Eugenio Hernández was elected governor with 58.26% of the vote.

He began his government on February 5, 2005. In May of that year, he introduced his Plan of Development of the State for the period 2005–2010, which was the guide for the public policy throughout his period of government, his government was based in three strategic lines: (i) Social Prosperity; (ii) Competitivity and Productivity; and (iii) Strong institutions and Government of results.

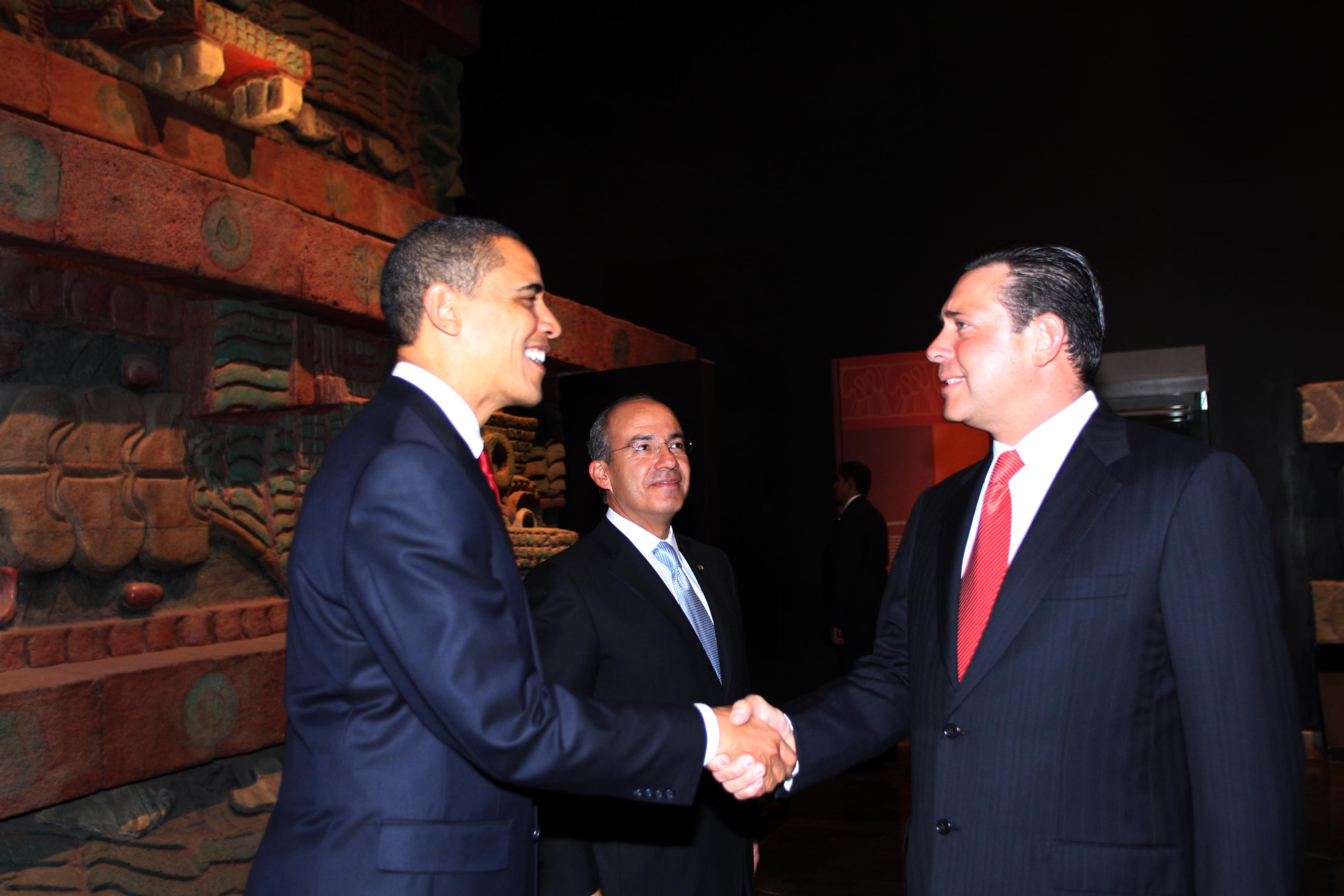
Eugenio Hernández Flores in a meeting with US president Barack Obama and the president of Mexico Felipe Calderón in 2009.

His government was notable for the constant fight against organized crime. He promoted an alliance with the rest of Mexican border states, the municipalities and the federal government to avoid the traffic of arms and people between the United States and Mexico. As a result of this agreement, the Mexican army was allowed to settle in Tamaulipas with thousands of troops to manage the fight against drug dealers and look after customs services in Tamaulipas. He expressed his agreement to make a public ballot question to put to people's consideration the possibility of imposing the capital punishment as a penalty for kidnapping and to stop the violence from crime. At the final stage of his government, Hernández Flores said that 42% of police members had been dismissed as they were untrustworthy.

With respect to relations with the US states bordering Tamaulipas, Hernández Flores was a principal critic of the immigration laws applied in Texas. He was against the barrier raised between the countries during his term in office. In economic matters, he promoted internal oil investments in Tamaulipas and the creation of jobs coming from that industry. Thus, when Petróleos Mexicanos announced that another refinery was going to be built in Mexico, Hernández Flores proposed that it be sited at Tamaulipas. It was ultimately decided that the refinery would be built in the state of Hidalgo.

During his term as governor, Fitch Ratings recognized excellent financial management in Tamaulipas. Nevertheless, after his government he was accused of generating excessive indebtedness.

== Indictment ==
On May 27, 2015, Hernández Flores was indicted on charges of money laundering alongside his brother-in-law Óscar Gómez Guerra by the United States Department of Justice (USDOJ), making him a fugitive wanted by the United States. A Mexican judge decided that Mexico should not extradite Hernández Florez for his U.S. criminal charges. However, the federal Judiciary Council states that he has more serious charges in Mexico, and should be tried there instead; it's also possible that Hernández Florez could be tried in both countries in part of a "temporary extradition agreement" between the U.S. and Mexico. The charges concern a US$30 million sum plus US$2 million invested in three properties in McAllen, Texas, and a fourth property in Austin, Texas.

Hernández Flores sought election as one of Tamaulipas's senators in the 2024 Senate election, occupying the first place on the Ecologist Green Party of Mexico's two-name formula. His candidacy was upheld by the Federal Electoral Tribunal on May 15, 2024, despite his ongoing extradition proceedings, but he failed to win the seat.

== See also ==
- List of fugitives from justice who disappeared

== Notes ==
Political offices
Preceded by Tomás Yarrington	Governor of Tamaulipas; 2005–2010	Succeeded by Egidio Torre Cantú
Preceded by Egidio Torre Cantú	Mayor of Ciudad Victoria; 2001–2004	Succeeded by Álvaro Villanueva Perales
