= Autonomous University of Tamaulipas =

Mexican public university in Victoria, Tamaulipas

- Universidad Autónoma de Tamaulipas
- Former names: Educación Profesional de Tampico, A.C. (Tampico's Professional Education)
- Motto: Spanish: Verdad, belleza, probidad
- Motto in English: Truth, Beauty, Probity
- Type: Public university
- Established: October 30, 1950
- Rector: Dámaso Leonardo Anaya Alvarado
- Students: 38,326 (2022)
- Location: Victoria, Tamaulipas, Mexico; 23.7330°N 99.1446°W
- Campus: Several across the state; mostly urban.
- Colors: Azul Naranja Blanco
- Nickname: Correcaminos (Roadrunners)
- Mascot: Roadrunner bird (Roadrunners)
- Website: www.uat.edu.mx
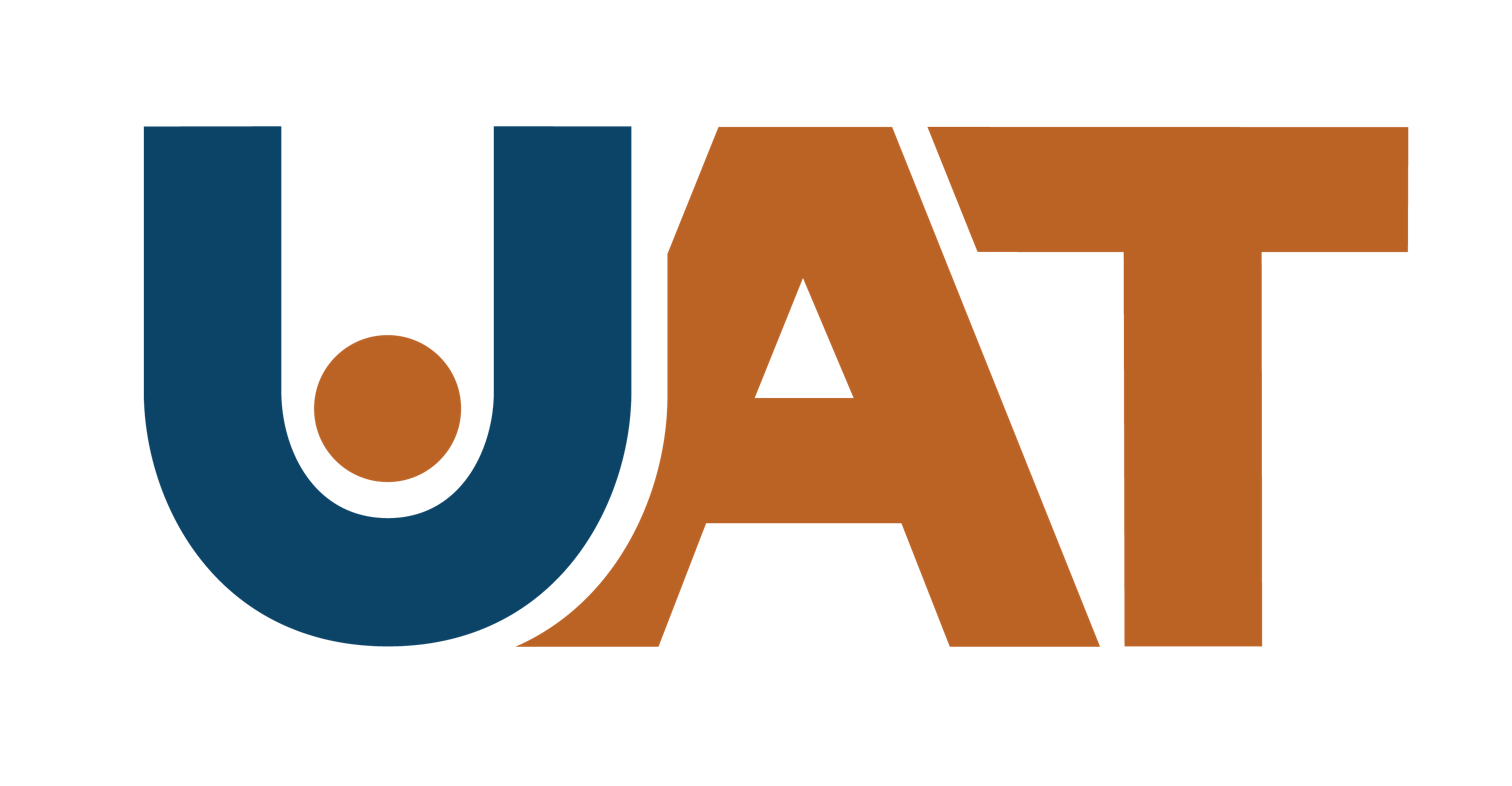

The Autonomous University of Tamaulipas (in Spanish: Universidad Autónoma de Tamaulipas, UAT) is a Mexican public university based in Ciudad Victoria, Tamaulipas. Throughout the larger cities of Reynosa, Matamoros, Nuevo Laredo, and Tampico and smaller cities of Ciudad Mante and Valle Hermoso are UAT campuses that offer undergraduate studies.

Each of the various university faculties offer graduate studies leading to the Master's or Doctorate Degree. The Faculty of Medicine of Tampico offers the professional degree of Physician & Surgeon (Medico-Cirujano) as well as post-graduate specialty certificates in: pediatrics, internal medicine, surgery, obstetrics & gynecology, family practice, and intensive care medicine. The university's "Center of Excellence" (Centro de Excelencia) sponsors specialized professional certificates and studies for the state of Tamaulipas.

== History ==
It was founded on 30 October 1950 at the port of Tampico as Educación Profesional de Tampico, A.C. (Tampico's Professional Education), a civil organization that sponsored a Faculty of Law and a Faculty of Medicine that were later incorporated into a public school under the auspices of the National Autonomous University of Mexico. On 5 November 1972, it was recognized as an autonomous university.

Since Ciudad Victoria is the capital city of Tamaulipas, the rectory building and the main administrative offices are headquartered in there. The main faculties of business, law, natural sciences, education and agriculture are based there as well. Ciudad Victoria is also the home of the university's football soccer team, the Correcaminos UAT.

The principal site of medicine, dentistry, nursing, law and engineering are in Tampico. The northern Tamaulipas cities of Matamoros and Nuevo Laredo each have smaller university campuses.

== Campuses ==
City	College
Nuevo Laredo	UAM de Comercio, Administración y Ciencias Sociales (Faculties of Business, Administration and Social Sciences)
Nuevo Laredo	UAM de Enfermería (Nursing School)
Reynosa	UAM de Reynosa Rodhe
Reynosa	Academic and Multidisciplinary Unit Reynosa Aztlan
Valle Hermoso	Escuela de Estudios Profesionales (School of Professional Studies)
Heroica Matamoros	Facultad de Medicina e ISC de Matamoros (Medical School and Computer Sistems Engineering Matamoros)
Heroica Matamoros	Unidad Académica Multidisciplinaria de Matamoros - UAT (Academic and Multidisciplinary Unit of Matamoros)
Ciudad Victoria	Law School and Social Sciences
Ciudad Victoria	Facultad de Comercio y Administración Victoria (School of Business Administration)
Ciudad Victoria	Facultad de Ingeniería y Ciencias (School of Engineering and Science)
Ciudad Victoria	Facultad de Enfermería Victoria (Faculty of Nursing)
Ciudad Victoria	UA Trabajo Social y Ciencias para el Desarollo Humano (School of Social Work and Human Development)
Ciudad Victoria	UAM Ciencias, Educación y Humanidades (Academic and Multidisciplinary Unit of Sciences, Education and the Humanities)
Ciudad Victoria	Facultad de Medicina Veterinaria y Zootecnia (School of Veterinary Medicine and Zoology)
Ciudad Victoria	Centro de Excelencia (University Center of Excellence)
Ciudad Mante	Academic and Multidisciplinary Unit Mante Centro
Ciudad Mante	Preparatoria Mante (Mante High School)
Tampico	Facultad de Enfermería Tampico (School of Nursing Tampico)
Tampico	Facultad de Medicina de Tampico Dr. Alberto Romo Caballero (School of Medicine Tampico Dr. Alberto Romo Caballero)
Tampico	UA Ciencias Jurídicas y Sociales (Academic Unit of Law and Sociology)
Tampico	Facultad de Comercio y Administración Tampico (School of Business Administration Tampico)
Tampico	Facultad de Música (School of Music)
Tampico	Facultad de Arquitectura, Diseño y Urbanismo (School of Architecture, Design and Urban Development)
Tampico	Facultad de Odontología (School of Dentistry)
Tampico	Facultad de Ingeniería "Arturo Narro Siller" (School of Engineering)
Tampico	Centro de Lenguas Extranjeras Tampico (Language Center Tampico)
