= Congress of Tamaulipas =

Legislature of Tamaulipas, Mexico

Congress of Tamaulipas Congreso de Tamaulipas
- LXVI legislature

Type
- Type: Unicameral
- Term limits: 1 period (3 years)

Structure
- Seats: 36 diputados
- Political groups: Morena (24) PAN (7) MC (2) PVEM (1) PT (1) PRI (1)
- Length of term: 3 years
- Authority: Political Constitution of the State of Tamaulipas
- Salary: MX$102,318 per month

Elections
- Voting system: 22 with first-past-the-post and 14 with proportional representation
- Last election: 2 June 2024
- Next election: 6 June 2027

Meeting place
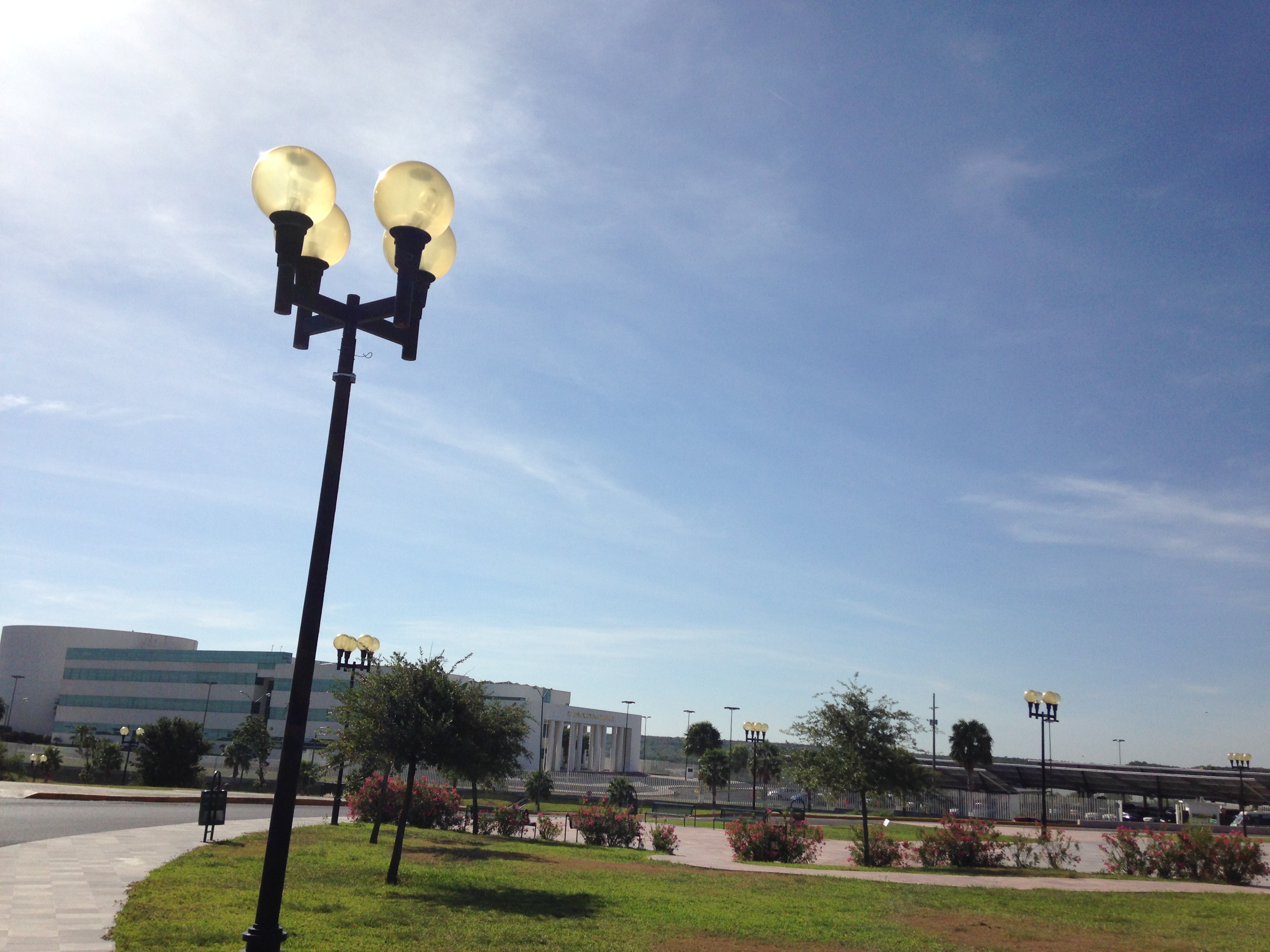
- Ciudad Victoria, Tamaulipas, Mexico

Website
- www.congresotamaulipas.gob.mx

The Honorable Congress of the State of Tamaulipas (Spanish: Honorable Congreso del Estado de Tamaulipas) is the legislature of Tamaulipas, a state of Mexico. The Congress is unicameral. It has 36 members, who serve three-year terms.

== Historical composition ==
This chart shows the historical composition of the Congress of Tamaulipas from the LVI Legislature to the present. It reflects the party affiliations of deputies at the time of their election and does not account for subsequent party switching.

Congress of Tamaulipas, 1995 to present

PAN / PRI / PARM / PFCRN / PRD / PT / PVEM / MC / PANAL / MORENA			Total
LVI	1995	1 / 1 / 3 / 20 / 7	32
LVII	1998	6 / 20 / 6	32
LVIII	2001	3 / 3 / 19 / 7	32
LIX	2004	2 / 2 / 19 / 9	32
LX	2007	1 / 2 / 3 / 19 / 3 / 4	32
LXI	2010	1 / 2 / 3 / 22 / 3 / 5	36
LXII	2013	1 / 1 / 1 / 3 / 17 / 3 / 10	36
LXIII	2016	2 / 2 / 2 / 10 / 1 / 19	36
LXIV	2019	10 / 1 / 3 / 22	36
LXV	2021	3 / 19 / 1 / 2 / 11	36
LXVI	2024	4 / 18 / 2 / 1 / 4 / 7	36

== See also ==
- List of Mexican state congresses
