= Governor of Tamaulipas =

Head of government of the Mexican state of Tamaulipas

- Incumbent; Américo Villarreal Anaya since October 1, 2022
- Residence: Casa de Gobierno, Ciudad Victoria
- Term length: Six years, non-renewable.
- Inaugural holder: José de Escandón y Helguera
- Formation: September 26, 1822

This is a list of governors of Tamaulipas since it became a state of Mexico in 1822, it includes the list of governors of Nuevo Santander (New Santander) the name of the Spanish province in northeast New Spain before the Mexican War of Independence, which included present-day Tamaulipas and South Texas.

== Nuevo Santander ==
Name	Term
José de Escandón y Helguera	31 May 1748–8 Apr 1767
Juan Fernando de Palacio	8 Apr 1767–20 Jan 1768
José Rubio	20 Jan 1768–18 Sep 1769
Vicente González Santianés	18 Sep 1769–12 Aug 1777
Francisco de Echegaray	Aug 1777–19 Feb 1779
Vacant	19 Feb 1779–17 Apr 1779
Manuel Medina	17 Apr 1779–21 Nov 1779
Vacant	21 Nov 1779–17 Feb 1780
Manuel Ignacio de Escandón (1st time)	17 Feb 1780–17 Mar 1781
Diego Lazaga	17 Mar 1781–20 Feb 1786
Juan Miguel Zozaya (1st time)	20 Feb 1786–23 Dec 1788
Melchor Vidal de Lorca	23 Dec 1788–18 Jun 1789
Juan Miguel Zozaya (2nd time)	20 Jun 1789–10 Sep 1789
Manuel Muñoz	10 Sep 1789–10 Jul 1790
Manuel Ignacio de Escandón (2nd time)	10 Jul 1790–21 May 1800
José Blanco	21 May 1800–Jan 1802
Francisco de Ixart	Jan 1802–18 Apr 1804
Pedro de Alba	18 Apr 1804–18 Sep 1804
Manuel de Iturbe e Iraeta	18 Sep 1804–15 Apr 1811
Joaquín de Arredondo	15 Apr 1811–1 May 1819
Juan Fermín de Janicotena	Sep 1811–Sep 1812
José María Echeagaray	1 May 1819–7 Jul 1821
Felipe de la Garza Cisneros	7 Jul 1821–22 Sep 1822

== State of Tamaulipas ==
The Governor is elected to a six-year term and may only hold the title once. This term begins on February 5 of the year before a presidential election and finishes on February 4 after a period of six years.

To be a candidate for Governor, one must be a Mexican citizen by birth, at least 30 years of age, and a native or resident of Tamaulipas for at least five years prior to the election.

=== Independence to Revolution ===
Name	Term
Don Pedro José de Lanuza	September 26, 1822 – November 28, 1822
Juan de Echeandía	November 28, 1822 – April 13, 1823
José Antonio Flores	April 21, 1823 – May 17, 1823
Jose Manuel Zozaya	May 17, 1823 – September 8, 1823
José Lino Perea	September 8, 1823 – September 23, 1823
Juan Francisco Gutierrez	September 23, 1823 – October 20, 1823
José Lino Perea	October 20, 1823 – October 28, 1823
Juan Francisco Gutierrez	October 28, 1823 – April 9, 1824
José Lino Perea	April 9, 1824 – April 18, 1824
Juan Francisco Gutierrez	April 18, 1824 – July 18, 1824
José Bernardo Maximiliano Gutiérrez de Lara	July 19, 1824 – July 28, 1824
Enrique Camilo Suarez	July 28, 1824 – October 2, 1824
José Bernardo Maximiliano Gutiérrez de Lara	October 2, 1824 – March 4, 1825
Enrique Camilo Suarez	March 4, 1825 – January 15, 1826
Lucas Fernandez	January 15, 1826 – June 10, 1828
Enrique Camilo Suarez	June 10, 1828 – October 1, 1828
Lucas Fernandez	October 1, 1828 – October 1, 1829
José Antonio Fernández Izaguirre	October 1, 1829 – December 27, 1829
Francisco Vital Fernandez	December 27, 1829 – January 13, 1830
Enrique Camilo Suarez	January 13, 1830 – February 18, 1830
Jose Manuel Zozaya	February 18, 1830 – April 5, 1830
Enrique Camilo Suarez	April 5, 1830 – April 20, 1830
Jose Manuel Zozaya	April 20, 1830 – July 7, 1830
Juan Guerra	July 7, 1830 – August 20, 1831
Francisco Vital Fernandez	August 20, 1831 – March 19, 1832
Jose Honorato de la Garza	March 19, 1832 – August 7, 1832
General Francisco Vital Fernandez	August 7, 1832 – March 1, 1833
Juan Nepomuceno Molano	March 1, 1833 – September 4, 1833
Francisco Vital Fernandez	September 4, 1833 – July 16, 1834
Ramon Cardenas	July 16, 1834 – September 17, 1834
Francisco Vital Fernandez	September 17, 1834 – March 20, 1835
José Guadalupe de Samano	March 20, 1835 – April 25, 1835
Francisco Vital Fernandez	April 25, 1835 – September 15, 1835
José Antonio Fernández Izaguirre	September 15, 1835 – August 1, 1836
José Guadalupe de Samano	August 1, 1836 – September 15, 1836
José Antonio Fernández Izaguirre	September 15, 1836 – May 29, 1837
Jose Antonio Quintero	May 29, 1837 – December 11, 1838
José Antonio Fernández Izaguirre	December 11, 1838 – March 24, 1839
Jose Antonio Quintero	March 24, 1839 – June 23, 1841
Jose Antonio Salazar y Boeta	June 23, 1841 – September 19, 1841
General Francisco Vital Fernandez	September 19, 1841 – June 9, 1843
Jose Ignacio Gutierrez	June 9, 1843 – July 10, 1843
Juan Nepomuceno Cortina	July 10, 1843 – August 21, 1843
Jose Ignacio Gutierrez	August 21, 1843 – December 18, 1844
Juan Nepomuceno Cortina	December 18, 1844 – January 18, 1845
Manuel de Saldaña	January 18, 1845 – February 4, 1845
Pedro José de la Garza	February 4, 1845 – July 21, 1845
Victorino T. Canales	July 21, 1845 – November 23, 1845
Juan Martin de la Garza Flores	November 23, 1845 – October 19, 1846
Manuel Núñez Ponce	August 28, 1846-did not take possession
Manuel Saldaña	October 19, 1846 – November 10, 1846
Francisco Vital Fernandez	November 10, 1846 – September 18, 1848
Eleno de Vargas	July 26, 1847 – August 16, 1847
Jesús de Cárdenas	September 18, 1848 – August 17, 1851
Antonio Canales Rosillo	August 17, 1851 – September 30, 1851
Jesús de Cárdenas	September 30, 1851 – November 19, 1852
Juan José de la Garza Cisneros	November 19, 1852 – December 21, 1852
Ramon Prieto	December 21, 1852 – January 13, 1853
Rafael Chovel	January 13, 1853 – March 20, 1853
Juan Francisco Villasana	March 20, 1853 – May 2, 1853
Adrian Woll	May 2, 1853 – January 28, 1855
Romulo Diaz de la Vega	January 28, 1855 – April 4, 1855
Adrian Woll	April 4, 1855 – September 8, 1855
Juan José de la Garza Cisneros	September 30, 1855 – May 9, 1856
Ramon Guerra	May 9, 1856 – August 9, 1856
José de la Garza Cisneros	August 9, 1856 – February 19, 1857
Tomás Moreno	February 19, 1857 – August 1, 1857
Andrés José de Cos	August 1, 1857 – August 27, 1857
Juan Fernández Flores	August 27, 1857 – October 19, 1857
Juan José de la Garza Cisneros	October 19, 1857 – January 7, 1858
Ramón Guerra	January 7, 1857 – January 17, 1858
Juan José de la Garza Cisneros	January 17, 1858 – March 12, 1858
Ramon Guerra	March 12, 1858 – July 30, 1858
Juan José de la Garza Cisneros	July 30, 1858 – February 26, 1859
Andrés Treviño	February 26, 1859 – January 13, 1860
Juan José de la Garza	April 16, 1860 – August 1, 1861
Manuel Saavedra	November 26, 1860 – February 9, 1861
Modesto Ortíz	August 1, 1861 – September 1, 1861
Jesús de la Serna	September 1, 1861 – January 30, 1862
Ignacio Comonfort	January 30, 1862 – August 9, 1862
Albino López	August 9, 1862 – September 15, 1862
Juan B. Troconis	September 15, 1862 – October 23, 1862
Albino López	October 23, 1862 – August 1, 1863
Manuel Ruíz	August 1, 1863 – November 5, 1863
Jesús de la Serna	November 5, 1863 – January 1, 1864
Manuel Ruíz	January 1, 1864 – January 12, 1864
Juan Nepomuceno Cortina	January 12, 1864 – September 26, 1864
Jose Maria Carvajal	September 26, 1864 – April 15, 1865
Francisco de León	April 1865-December 1865
Juan Nepomuceno Cortina	March 1865-late 1866
Jose Maria Carvajal	March 4, 1866 – August 20, 1866
Servando Canales Molano	August 20, 1866 – August 31, 1866
Santiago Tapia	August 31, 1866 – November 3, 1866
Felipe Berriozábal (Northern District)	September 30, 1866 – September 1, 1867
Ascensión Gómez (Central District)	September 30, 1866-March 1867
Francisco de León (Central District)	March 6, 1867 – June 27, 1867
Felipe Escandón (Central District)	June 27, 1867 – July 5, 1867
Juan de Haro	September 30, 1866 – April 3, 1867
Desiderio Pavón	August 14, 1867 – April 16, 1868
Francisco L. Saldaña	April 16, 1868 – July 31, 1868
Juan José de la Garza Cisneros	August 1, 1868 – December 1, 1869
Francisco L. Saldaña	December 1, 1869 – August 30, 1870
Servando Canales Molano	September 1, 1870 – June 1, 1872
Ramón Guerra	June 1, 1872 – August 5, 1872
Servando Canales Molano	August 5, 1872 – September 10, 1874
Francisco Echartea	September 10, 1874 – June 1, 1875
Servando Canales Molano	June 1, 1875 – September 6, 1875
Francisco Echartea	September 25, 1875 – April 20, 1876
Servando Canales Molano	April 20, 1876 – November 6, 1876
José Martínez	October 17, 1865 – October 28, 1876
Gómez Ascensión Mansilla	November 6, 1876 – January 13, 1877
Juan Gojón	January 13, 1877 – February 6, 1877
Francisco Echartea	February 6, 1877 – November 22, 1877
Juan Gójon	November 22, 1877 – October 16, 1878
Francisco Echartea	October 16, 1878 – April 10, 1879
Juan Gójon	April 11, 1879 – May 12, 1880
Antonio Canales Molano	May 12, 1880 – May 3, 1884
Juan Gójon	January 18, 1884 – March 12, 1884
Romulo Cuellar	May 4, 1884 – May 3, 1888
Alejandro Prieto Quintero	May 4, 1888 – May 3, 1896
José Guadalupe Mainero Juárez	May 4, 1896 – July 31, 1901
Alejandro Prieto Quintero	July 31, 1901 – August 10, 1901
Matías Guerra	August 10, 1901 – September 30, 1901
Pedro Argüelles	October 1, 1901 – March 3, 1908
Juan B. Castelló	March 4, 1908 – June 1, 1911
Espiridión Espiridión	June 1, 1911 – November 30, 1911
Matías Guerra	November 30, 1911 – February 4, 1912
Joaquin Argüelles	February 5, 1912 – May 5, 1912
Matías Guerra	May 5, 1912 – January 12, 1913
José C. Mainero	January 12, 1913 – January 30, 1913
Joaquín Argüelles	June 28, 1913 – July 24, 1913
Antonio Rabago	July 24, 1913 – November 18, 1913
Ignacio Zaragoza Morelos	November 19, 1913 – May 14, 1914
Luis Caballero Vargas	November 18, 1913 – July 26, 1916
Gonzalo Castro	October 15, 1914 – October 20, 1914
Máximo García	April 16, 1915 – June 9, 1915
Raúl Garate Legleú	October 7, 1915 – November 24, 1915
Raúl Garate Legleú	March 1916-June 1916
Flores Trejo Fidencio	July 26, 1916 – February 22, 1917

=== Constitution of 1917 ===
Name	Party	Term	Notes:
Américo Villarreal Anaya	MORENA	2022–present	
Francisco García Cabeza de Vaca	PAN	2016–2022	First governor not affiliated with the PRI, since 1933.
Egidio Torre Cantú	PRI	2011–2016	
Eugenio Hernández Flores	PRI	2005–2011	Fugitive pursued by United States Department of Justice for an alleged money laundering done in association with his brother-in-law Gomez Guerra.
Tomás Yarrington	PRI	1999–2005	Yarrington pled guilty of money laundering and accepting bribes as governor on March 26, 2021. Ten other charges, related to drug trafficking, were dismissed. Yarrington can be sentenced to between eight and eleven years in prison, and his condominium in Puerto Isabel, Texas, was seized.
Manuel Cavazos Lerma	PRI	(1993–1999)	
Américo Villarreal Guerra	PRI	(1987–1993)	
Emilio Martínez Manautou	PRI	(1981–1987)	
Enrique Cárdenas González	PRI	(1975–1981)	
Manuel A. Rabize	PRI	(1969–1975)	
Praxedis Balboa	PRI	(1963–1969)	
Norberto Treviño Zapata	PRI	(1957–1963)	
Horacio Terán	PRI	(1951–1957)	
Raúl Garate	PRI	(1947–1951)	
Hugo Pedrero González	Party of the Mexican Revolution, PRM	(1945–1947)	
Magdaleno Aguilar	PRM	(1941–1945)	
Marte R. Gómez	National Revolutionary Party, PNR	(1937–1941)	
Enrique Canseco	PNR	(1935–1937)	
Aniceto Villanueva	PNR	(1935)	
Loreto Garza	PNR	(1935)	
Ramón Rocha	PNR	(1934–1935)	
Albino Hernández	PNR	(1933)	
Rafael Villarreal	PNR	(1933–1935)	
Zeferino Fajardo	PNR	(1929–1933)	
Baudelio Villanueva	PNR	(1929)	
Francisco Castellanos	PNR	(1929–1933)	
Juan Rincón		(1928–1929)	
Benito Juárez Ochoa		(1927)	
Emilio Portes Gil		(1925–1929)	President of Mexico, 1928-1930
Gregorio Garza Salinas		(1924–1925)	
Candelario Garza		(1924)	
Pelayo Quintana		(1924)	
Benecio López Padilla		(1923–1924)	
Juan Manuel Ramírez		(1922–1923)	
José F. Montesinos		(1922)	
César López Lara		(1921–1923)	
José Morante		(1920–1921)	
Federico Martínez Rojas		(1920)	
Emilio Portes Gil		(1920)	
Rafael Cárdenas		(1920)	
Francisco González Villarreal		(1919–1920)	
Andrés Osuna		(1918–1919)	
Alfredo Ricaut		(1917–1918)	
Luis Ilizaliturri		(1917)	
Gregorio Osuna		(1917)	

== See also ==
- List of Mexican state governors
