= Canales (surname) =

Canales is a Spanish surname, and may refer to:

- Álamo Pérez-Luna Canales (1963–2025), Peruvian television presenter
- Anel Canales (born 1978), Panamanian footballer
- Antonio Canales Rosillo (1802–1852), a 19th-century Mexican politician, surveyor, and military general
- Blanca Canales (1906–1996), educator and Puerto Rican Nationalist
- Carla Dirlikov Canales, American mezzo-soprano singer
- Diosa Canales (born 1987), Venezuelan singer, actress, and model
- Elia Canales (born 2001), Spanish archer
- Enrique Canales (1936–2007), technologist, editor, political analyst, painter and sculptor
- Evaristo Merino Canales (died 1930), ninth Mayor of the commune of Pichilemu
- Felipe González de Canales, one of the founders of the Escuelas Familiares Agrarias (Agrarian Family Schools)
- Fernanda Canales (born 1974), Mexican architect, designer, critic and curator of Mexican architecture
- Fernando Canales Clariond (born 1946), Mexican politician and businessman affiliated with the National Action Party (PAN)
- Fernando J. Canales (born 1959), former freestyle swimmer from Puerto Rico and swimming coach
- Francisco Canales (born 1957), Puerto Rican former swimmer who competed in the 1976 Summer Olympics
- Gustavo Canales (born 1982), Argentine-born Chilean footballer
- Jimena Canales, Mexican-American physicist and engineer, award-winning historian of science and author
- Joaquín Canales (born 1962), Salvadoran former footballer
- Johnny Canales (born 1947), former Tejano singer, host of The Johnny Canales Show
- Jose Antonio Canales Rivera (born 1974), Spanish bullfighter
- José Ferrer Canales (1913–2005), educator, writer and a pro-independence political activist
- José Francisco Canales (born 1987), football goalkeeper
- José Tomás Canales (1877–1976), American lawyer, writer, businessman, and politician
- Juan Bosco Maino Canales (died 1976), photographer, political activist, opponent of Augusto Pinochet's regime in Chile
- Juan Díaz Canales (born 1972), Spanish comics artist and an animated film director, co-creator of Blacksad
- Kaleb Canales (born 1978), American basketball coach
- Laura Canales (1954–2005), American Tejano musician, an original inductee in the Tejano Roots Hall of Fame
- Lorea Canales, lawyer, journalist, translator and writer
- Lourdes Quiñones Canales (born 1953), Mexican politician affiliated with the PRI
- Manuel Martínez Canales (1928–2014), known as Manolín, Spanish professional footballer
- María Torre Canales (born 1974), Mexican politician from the New Alliance Party
- Marisa Canales (born 1959), Mexican flute player
- Marta Canales (1893–1986), Chilean violinist, choral conductor and composer
- Máximo Canales or Paul del Rio (1943–2015), Venezuelan sculptor, painter and revolutionary
- Mike Canales (born 1961), American college football coach and former player
- Nemesio Canales (1878–1923), Puerto Rican writer, politician and activist who defended women's civil rights
- Nicolás Canales (born 1985), Chilean footballer that plays as a striker for Deportes Temuco
- Ricardo Canales (born 1982), Honduran footballer
- Sergio Canales (born 1991), Spanish professional footballer
- Susana Canales (1933–2021), Spanish film and television actress
- Terry A. Canales, American politician
- Terry Canales, Democratic member of the Texas House of Representatives, serving since 2013
- Vic Canales, American radio and television personality of Spanish descent
- Viola Canales (born 1957), American writer originally from McAllen, Texas

== See also ==
- Canales, Spain
- Chozas de Canales, Spain
- Villa Canales, Guatemala
- Canales Reservoir, Spain
- Canales de la Sierra, Spain
- Llera de Canales, Tamaulipas, Mexico
- Canale (disambiguation)
- Canal (disambiguation)
