= Tomasa Ortiz Real =

Blessed Tomasa Ortiz Real

Religious
- Born: 12 November 1842; Bocairent, Valencia, Kingdom of Spain
- Died: 26 February 1916 (aged 73); Alcantarilla, Murcia, Kingdom of Spain
- Venerated in: Roman Catholic Church
- Beatified: 21 March 2004, Saint Peter's Square, Vatican City by Pope John Paul II
- Feast: 26 February
- Attributes: Religious habit
- Patronage: Salesian Sisters of the Sacred Heart; Vocations

Tomasa Ortiz Real (12 November 1842 – 26 February 1916) was a Spanish Roman Catholic professed religious who founded the Salesian Sisters of the Sacred Heart and assumed the religious name of "Piedad of the Cross" upon becoming a nun.

Real's religious vocation blossomed during her late childhood following the reception of her First Communion though a range of impediments prevented her from embracing the religious life. She soon realized her dream and became a professed nun while devoting her time to the care of the ill and orphaned children while using her order's resources to expand her work.

The beatification for Real was presided in Saint Peter's Square on 21 March 2004 with Pope John Paul II presiding over the celebration.

== Life ==
Tomasa Ortiz Real was born on 12 November 1842 in Spain as the fifth of eight children to José and Tomasa Ortiz (d. 1866); her sisters were Antonia and Mariana. Her baptism was celebrated on the following 13 November. She was known in her childhood for a range of talents including her musical and acting talents. Real made her First Communion in 1852 which caused in her a sensation that blossomed into a clear call to the religious life which remained well into her adolescence.

Her mother's death in 1866 forced Real's father to relocate with his children to Canales.

She completed her education at the Loreto College and asked to enter the novitiate of the order that ran it. This never manifested due to her father forcing her to remain at home due to her age and the political tensions in Spain at the time. Her confessor during her adolescence was the priest Gualtero de Castro. She thought that she would never be able to achieve her dream so decided to enter a Carmelite convent in Valencia though her contracting cholera forced her to exit the novitiate and leave for home. She instead worked as a textile worker with a modest source of income.

Real relocated to Barcelona and had a profound experience in which she envisioned the Sacred Heart of Jesus Christ where He showed her His pierced left side. In March 1884 - with the diocesan approval of the Bishop of Cartágena-Murcia - she and three companions left Barcelona for Puebla de Soto and began to live together in a group devoted to the Carmelite charism near Alcantarilla. She assumed the religious name of "Piedad of the Cross" and began to aid the ill and orphaned children at a hospital not to far from their residence; the companions aided people during a period of flooding and cholera in 1884. Tensions began to surface between the two religious communities of Alcantarilla and Caudete and in August 1884 the latter began to 'claim' those of the former to start their own order. This left Real alone with Sister Alfonsa as her sole companion.

On 8 September 1890 she founded an order as a means of aiding the old and the orphaned as well as catering to the needs of the sick. Real selected Saint Francis de Sales as the order's patron.

Real died in 1916 and died with the Crucifix on her lips. The congregation received diocesan approval on 19 December 1895 while receiving the papal decree of praise of Pope Pius XI on 25 January 1935; Pope Pius XII granted full approval of the order on 12 June 1953. The order now operates in Argentina and Bolivia.

== Beatification ==
The beatification process commenced in Cartágena on 15 December 1981 when the Congregation for the Causes of Saints granted the "nihil obstat" ('nothing against') to the cause and bestowed the title of Servant of God upon her. The cognitional process commenced in Spain on 6 February 1982 and concluded on 7 May 1983 when all documentation was submitted to officials in Rome.

The C.C.S. validated the cognitional process on 3 February 1984 and the postulation submitted the Positio to the C.C.S. in 1992. Historians first met to discuss whether historical obstacles existed to prevent the cause from proceeding and went on to approve it; this enabled the cause to proceed to the next stage. Theologians assented to the contents of the Positio on 28 January 2000 while the C.C.S. did so as well on 2 May 2000.

On 1 July 2000 she was proclaimed to be Venerable after Pope John Paul II recognized that the late religious had in fact lived a life of heroic virtue.

The miracle needed for her to be beatified was investigated in Spain and was validated on 6 December 1996. A medical board on 8 May 2002 approved the healing to be a credible miracle while theologians supported this verdict on 13 December 2002. The C.C.S. provided assent to the healing on 18 February 2003 while Pope John Paul II provided his final assent on 12 April 2003 to the miracle.

John Paul II beatified her in Saint Peter's Square on 21 March 2004.
