= Canale (surname) =

Canale is a popular Italian surname. The name is thought to have originated in various parts of Northern Italy and its literal English translation is "Canal", which means waterway. Italian surnames were often taken from places of residence, such as a town or village. Names were also derived from landmarks, which could explain the Canale name. Persons with this surname include:

- Gianna Maria Canale (1927–2009), Italian Actress
- Giuseppe Canale (1725−1802), Italian painter and engraver
- Gonzalo Canale, Italian rugby player
- Jos Canale, Canadian ice hockey coach
- Michelangelo Canale, American dancer and choreographer
- Michele Giuseppe Canale (1808−1890), Italian historian
- George Canale, Major League Baseball player
