= Ciudad Victoria =

Capital of the State of Tamaulipas, Mexico

- City
- Ciudad Victoria
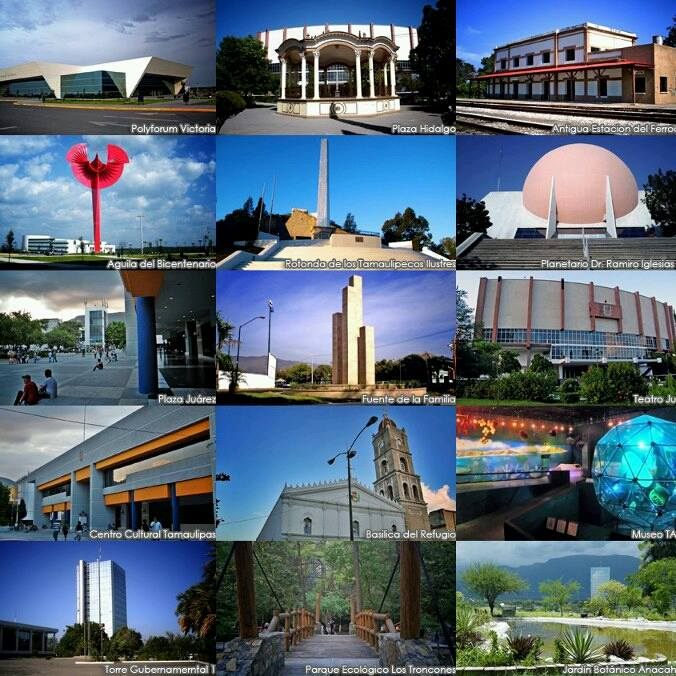

- Coat of arms

- Location within Tamaulipas Location within Mexico
- Coordinates: 23°44′20″N 99°08′35″W
- Country: Mexico
- State: Tamaulipas
- Foundation: 6 October 1750
- Founded as: Villa de Santa María de Aguayo
- Founder: José de Escandón y Helguera

Government
  - Municipal President (2021- 2024): Eduardo Abraham Gattas Báez (2021–present) MORENA

Area
  - City: 188 km^{2} (73 sq mi)
- Elevation: 316 m (1,037 ft)

Population (2022)
  - City: 349,688
  - Density: 1,860/km^{2} (4,820/sq mi)
  - Metro: 432,100
- Demonym: Victorense
- Time zone: UTC−06:00 (Zona Centro)
- Postal code: 87000
- Area code: +52 834
- Website: www.ciudadvictoria.gob.mx

Ciudad Victoria (Spanish pronunciation: [sjuˈðað biɣˈtoɾja]) (English: Victoria City) is the capital city of the Mexican state of Tamaulipas and the seat of the Municipality of Victoria. It is located in the northeast of Mexico at the foot of the Sierra Madre Oriental. It borders the municipality of Güémez to the north, Llera to the south, Casas Municipality to the east, and the municipality of Jaumave to the west. The city is located 246 km (153 mi) from Monterrey and 319 km (198 mi) from the US - Mexico border. Ciudad Victoria is named after the first president of Mexico, Guadalupe Victoria.

In 1825 Ciudad Victoria became the state capital. It is home to higher education institutions such as the Autonomous University of Tamaulipas and the Technological Institute of Ciudad Victoria. General Pedro José Méndez International Airport is located on the outskirts of the city. As a state bureaucratic centre, it is the seat of the three political powers and has sites of tourist and cultural interest.

== Pre-foundation ==
Viceroyalty of New Spain

The Viceroy of New Spain, Juan Francisco Güémez and Horcasitas on Saturday, 3 September 1746, founded a colony in the Seno Mexicano (West coast of the Gulf of Mexico), dismembering the New Kingdom of León. Two years later, on Wednesday 25 December 1748, José de Escandon and Helguera founded Villa de Llera, part of the Late Colonization of New Santander, named after Santander, the capital of Cantabria, Spain. Villa de Santa María del Agua de Agüayo was founded on 6 October 1750.

== History ==
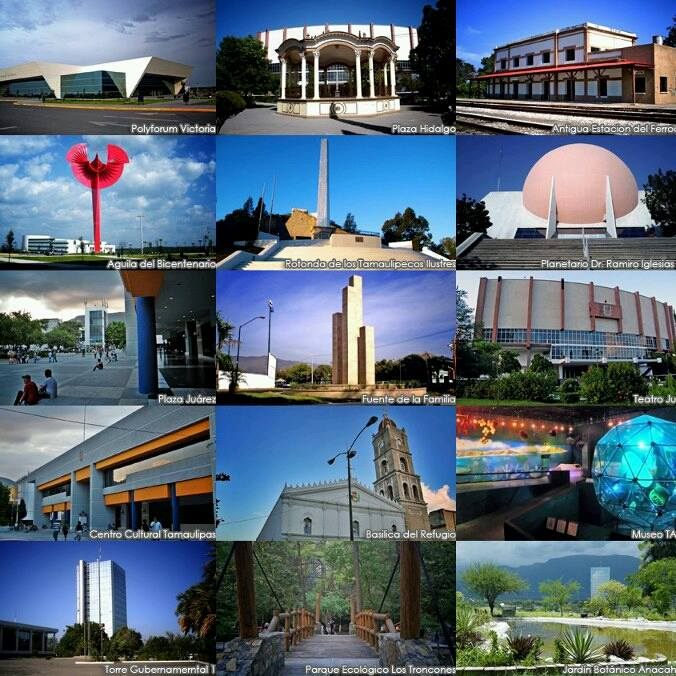
Montage of places in Ciudad Victoria

Villa de Santa María de Aguayo was named after the wife of the first Count of Revillagigedo Don Juan Francisco de Güémez y Horcasitas, named Doña Antonia Cepherina Pacheco de Padilla, a native of Aguayo, Province of Santander, Spain.

The settlement was founded by José de Escandon and Helguera, Count of Sierra Gorda, during his second campaign of the Pacification and Colonization Plan of the coast of the Mexican Seno, later called New Santander, today Tamaulipas. The Spanish settlement open to the plain to the East and surrounded to the west by the Sierra Madre Oriental, a strategic location that also received breezes from the north and east. The town was administered by Captain D. Juan de Astigárraga, who drew up and carried out the first irrigation works. His work led to an increase in agriculture and, subsequently, a rapid rise in population.

In religious matters, the settlement was under the command of a Franciscan named Antonio Javier de Aréchaga, who was also in charge of the mission of San Felipe, which was founded with 150 indigenous people. That Catholic mission progressed more than those previously founded, because in the lands that were designated, they were opened by local Native Americans.

Captain Astigárraga died three years after the Villa de Agüayo was founded, and Escandon then conferred the appointment of captain to replace him in the command, Don Miguel de Córdoba.

Under the administration of the new captain, the Villa de Agüayo continued to progress, and when its statistics were formed in 1757, the settlement had in its farmhouse and estates located in its demarcation more than 1000 inhabitants who had 8600 heads of cattle and horses, and 4100 of smaller cattle.

The noble and military of Belgian descent, José de Craywinckel, when he visited the settlement, proposed to the Viceroy the reactivation of the Olazarán mine, which was abandoned in the Boca de Caballeros, since this measure would tend to give the settlement greater impetus in its prosperity, creating new interests and attracting new neighbours by this means, it being possible to expect that Villa de Aguayo would soon become one of the main populations of the new colony.

The nobleman also proposed to the Viceroy at that time, to undertake a campaign against rebellious Native Americans of the Síghue, who had their rancherías by the ravines and valleys of the Sierra Madre and in defines of their land harassed the shepherds and estates of the demarcation of Aguayo, arriving in his raids to join with the Janambre people in the attacks they undertook against the nearby Spanish settlements of Jaumave and Llera.

By this date some masonry houses were begun to be built in Aguayo, the materials for the construction of a Catholic church were gathered and large sugarcane plantations were established in the surrounding lands. The neighbourhood of this town also carried out the salt trade that was going to be collected from the saltworks of San Fernando and la Marina, with the villages of the interior of Charcas and the southern part of the New Kingdom of León.

The Spanish settlement of Villa de Aguayo was distributed in perfect grid form, and in its second settlement a few leagues east of its foundation, changing by the constant claim of the Native American tribes of Janambres and Pisones. The settlement was from the beginning the geographical central node communicating with all the settlements of New Santander.

As was the Spanish provision, land was designated for the construction of the Catholic Church, the Public Square, the seat of the Captaincy of the Civil - Military and Trade Authority, spaces that over time are known as the Historical Centre, formerly known as Plaza "Hidalgo", "Plaza de Armas" or "Plaza de Catedral". The settlement was dispersed and composed of 58 families with 409 people.

The river that crossed the settlement is the so-called San Marcos, which has an irrigation ditch, whose abundance of water gave the population all the irrigation it needs for the subsistence of its inhabitants, irrigation of plots and other sowing of corn, fostering also the cultivation of the cane. The quality of the land was adequate for all fruits typical of the region and facilitated the breeding and conservation of livestock.

Its location was one of the most advantageous in favour of the Royal Treasury, both for being the first transit of the colony, and because its crops and livestock promise great movement, evidencing its growth at the beginning of its founding, which was 11 families.

=== Colonial period ===
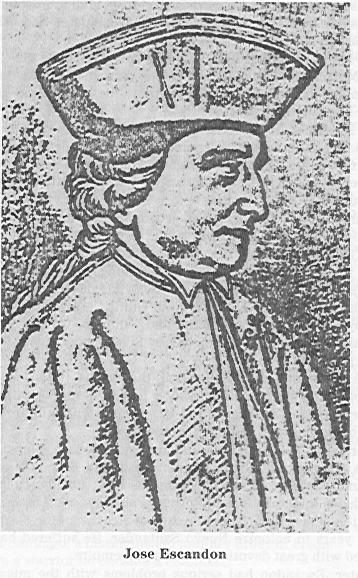
José de Escandón y Helguera, 1st Count of Sierra Gorda

Unlike the modes of settlement that were commonly raised during the vice-regal period in New Spain, which followed a missionary and presidial structure, the new populations designed by José de Escandon had marked differences in the cultural, social, political and economic spheres.

The new populations that Escandon developed in the territory that is now known as Tamaulipas, called in the eighteenth-century New Santander, are based on ideas that have as a reference a way of exercising control over the development of the city and the territory, through its economic production. The direct consequences of this form of urban design marked in New Spain the opening to a new way of consolidating a border territory.

José de Escandon y Helguera, developed cattle ranching extensively and in a limited way agriculture, since for the most part "temporary" was practiced, and commerce also developed. The colonized territory was integrated and populated up to the Rio Grande, configuring the map of what is now Tamaulipas.

In addition, Escandon proposed the strategic location arrangements between each new population, a day away, which would facilitate that in cases of reoccurrence of attacks by the natives, could support each other. These are the characteristics that made the colonization of the New Santander transcendent; Although the reality did not always reflect the initial spirit of colonization, the model developed by José de Escandon proposed a new form of territorial occupation that had not been seen until the 18th century in New Spain.

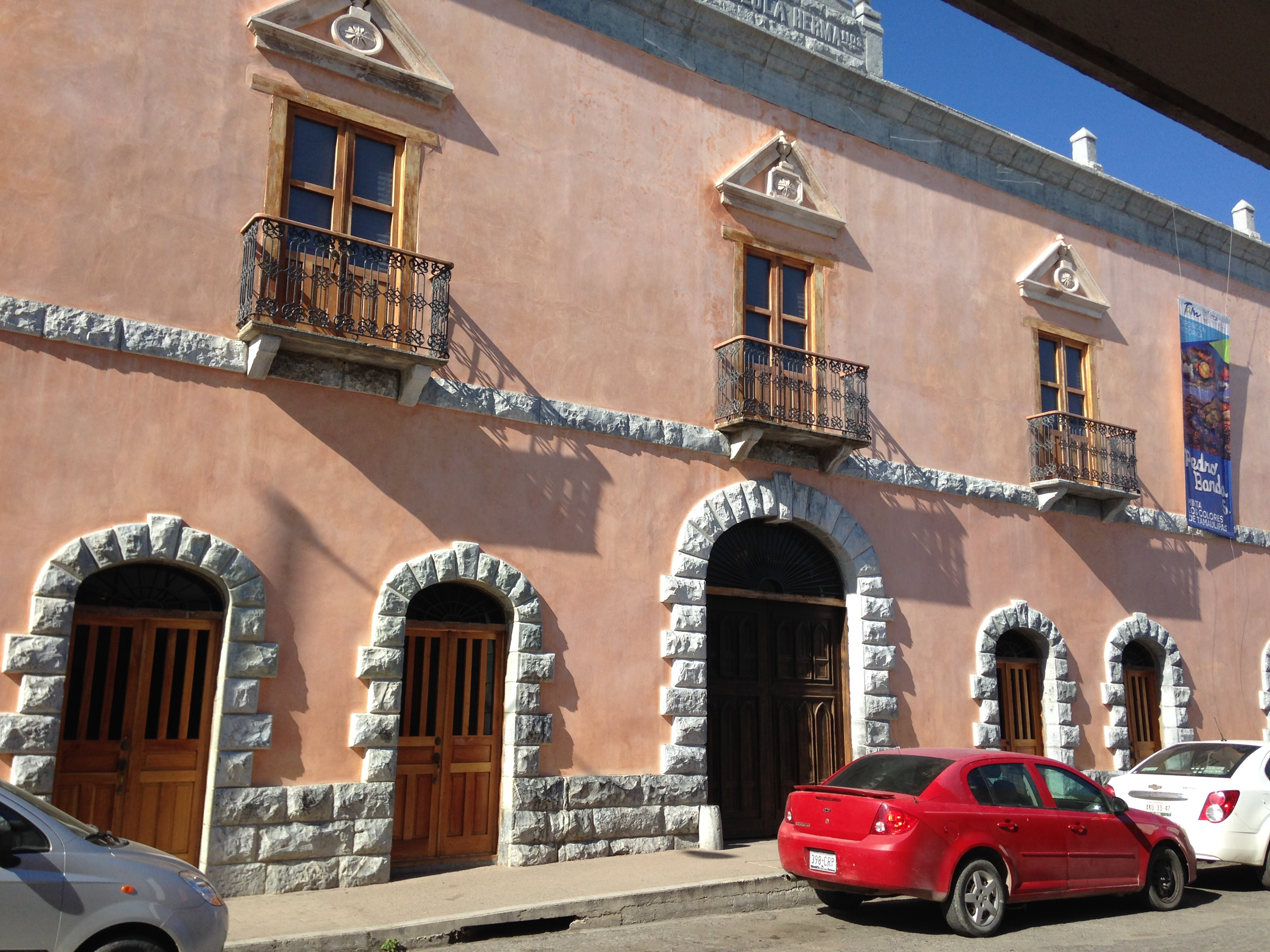
Casa de los Hermanos Filizola, restored to inhabit the Pinacoteca Tamaulipas, Ciudad Victoria, Mexico

=== Post-colonial period ===
After the Mexican Independence New Santander was renamed "Tamaulipas", and the State Congress decrees on 20 April 1825, to elevate the Villa de Aguayo to the category of "City", seat of the Three Powers and Capital of the State, approving the name of Victoria, in honour of the first President of Mexico, Guadalupe Victoria. "The Capitality Decree, Title of City and Name" is published by mandate of the First Congress, signed and sealed by Enrique Camilo Suárez, Vice Governor of Tamaulipas.

In this Capital, the Governor of the State, Lucas Fernández, on 4 May issued a decree to reject the invasion by order of the Spanish monarchy. The attempt of reconquest by the Spanish vanguard army commanded by General Brigadier Isidro Barradas, was frustrated on 11 September 1829, in Tampico, Tamaulipas; At the head of the national forces were the Generals: Felipe de la Garza Cisneros, Manuel Mier and Terán and Antonio López de Santa Anna. Battle of Tampico (1863) was one of the few battles against a foreign intervention in Mexico where the invaders have surrendered against the Mexican forces.

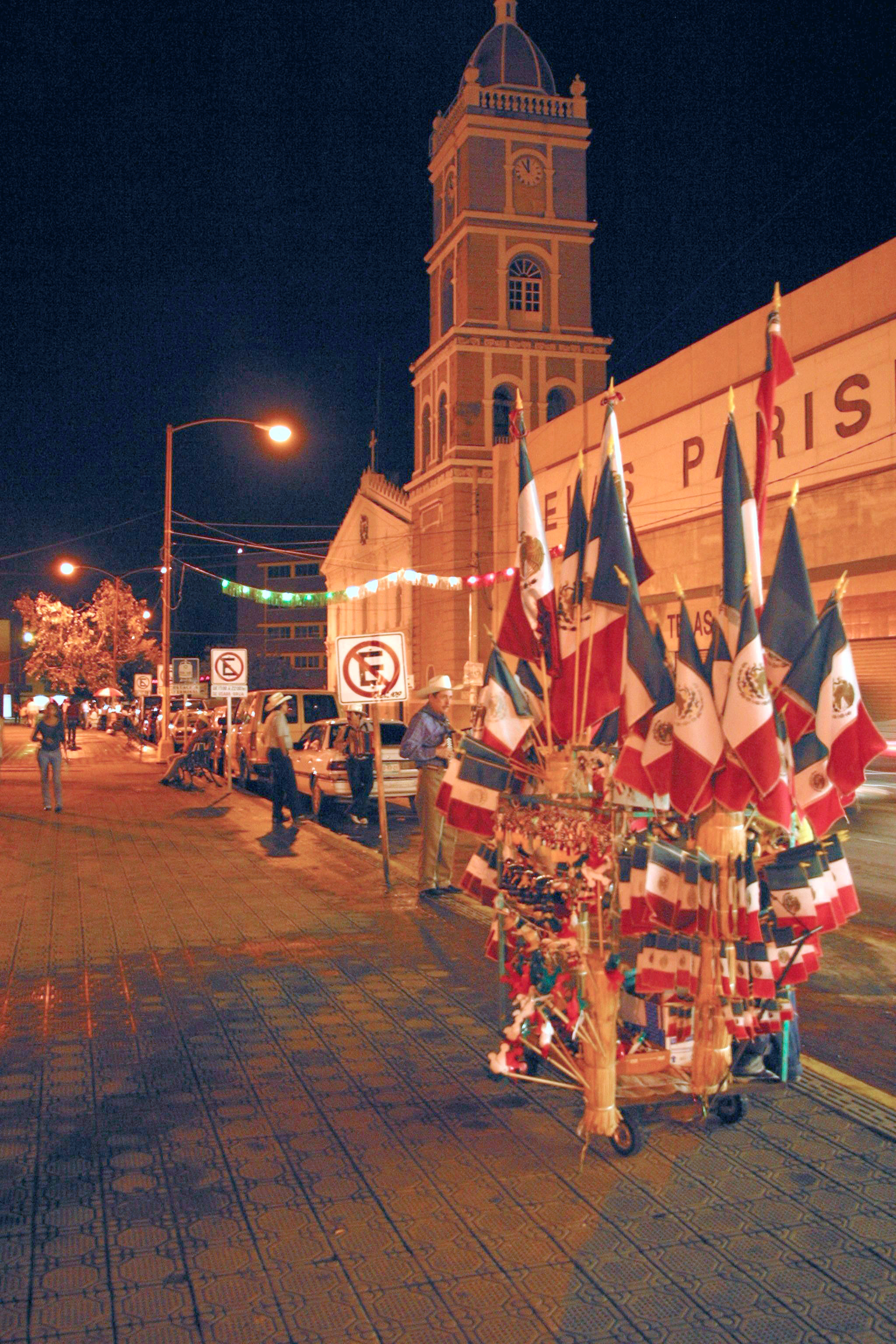
Sale of flags in the month of September in the Plaza Juarez of Ciudad Victoria

In 1846, in the Mexican–American War, Ciudad Victoria was occupied on 25 December by troops from the United States and was liberated at the end of the war. In 1898, President Porfirio Díaz sponsored the operation of the urban animal-drawn railroad that ran down Hidalgo Street to the Train Station, and a branch to the Hacienda de Tamatán, properties of Colonel Manuel González Jr. and that same year the Paseo Méndez was founded, inspired by Parisian street Champs-Élysées.

=== 20th century ===
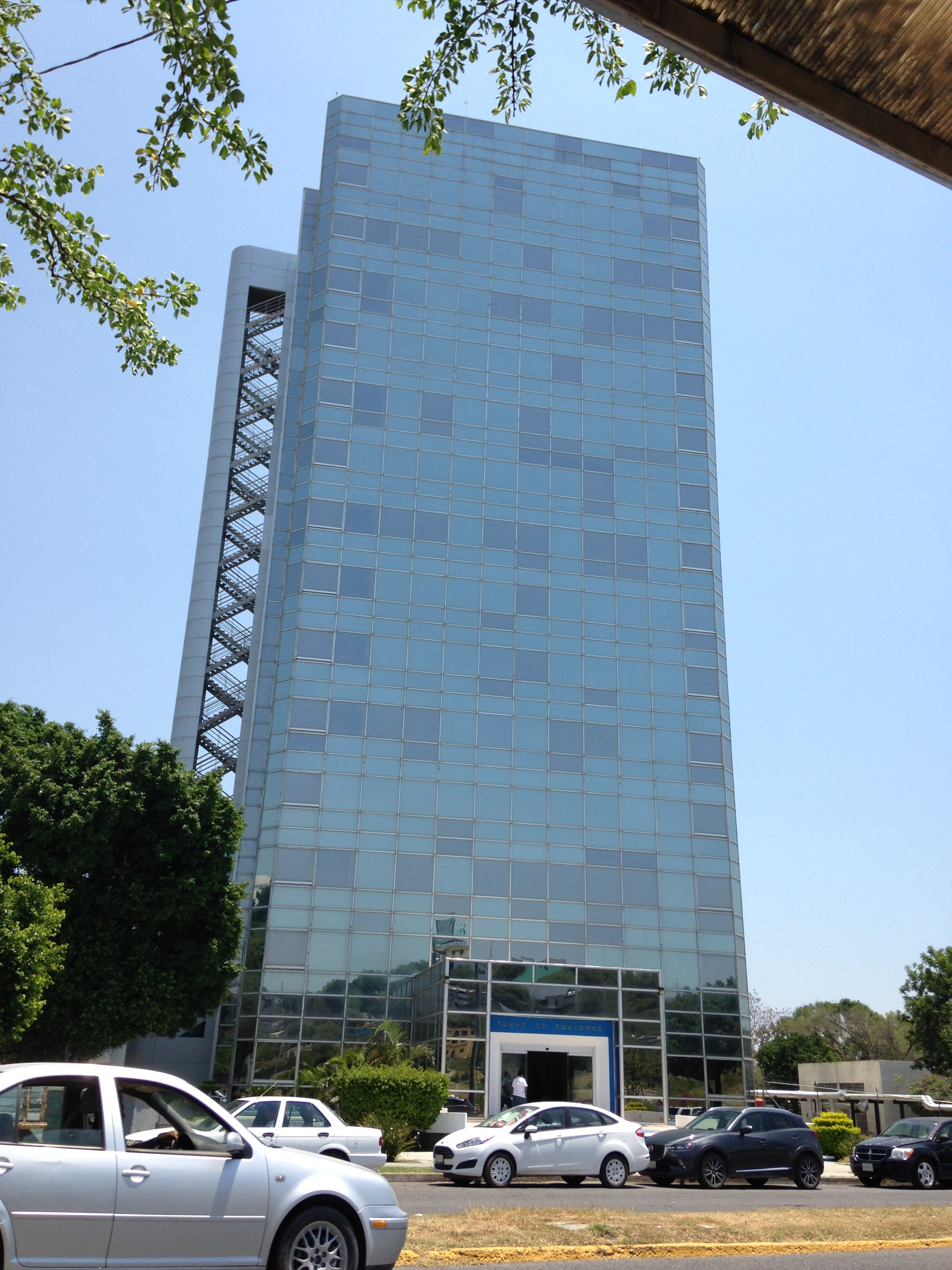
Government complex built at the end of the 20th century

The city began its industrial transformation in the late 19th and early 20th centuries, with the administration of Guadalupe Mainero Juárez which attracted investments and improvements to the city.

On 15 September 1910, the monument to the Heroes of Independence was inaugurated, in the "Plaza Colón" in front of the railway station "La Recoletta". In 1917 General Alberto Carrera Torres was shot at the wall of the Municipal Pantheon, having been tried by an illegal War Council; he is buried in the French Pantheon. In 1923 General César López de Lara took the governorship of the state of Tamaulipas.

The Victorense Casino AC, formerly known as the social and mutualist centre of the city, was founded in 1929. The urban and architectural structure of the city is defined in its buildings, buildings of the late 19th and early 20th centuries. The creation of the Federal Highway 85 and other road works connect the capital with the Mexico–U.S. border and the centre of the country. In 1939 Eng. Marte R. Gómez inaugurated the Olympic-type Stadium that nowadays bears his name and where the team plays Correcaminos Football Club. In 1941 the "El Petaqueño" Airport, now called General Pedro José Méndez International Airport, began operations.

In 1951 the new Government Palace was inaugurated, built in the building where the Old Theatre "Casino" or "Juárez" was, the new "Juárez" theatre was inaugurated in 1957; The government tower known as "Crystal Tower" exists in the capital since 1980.

=== 21st century ===
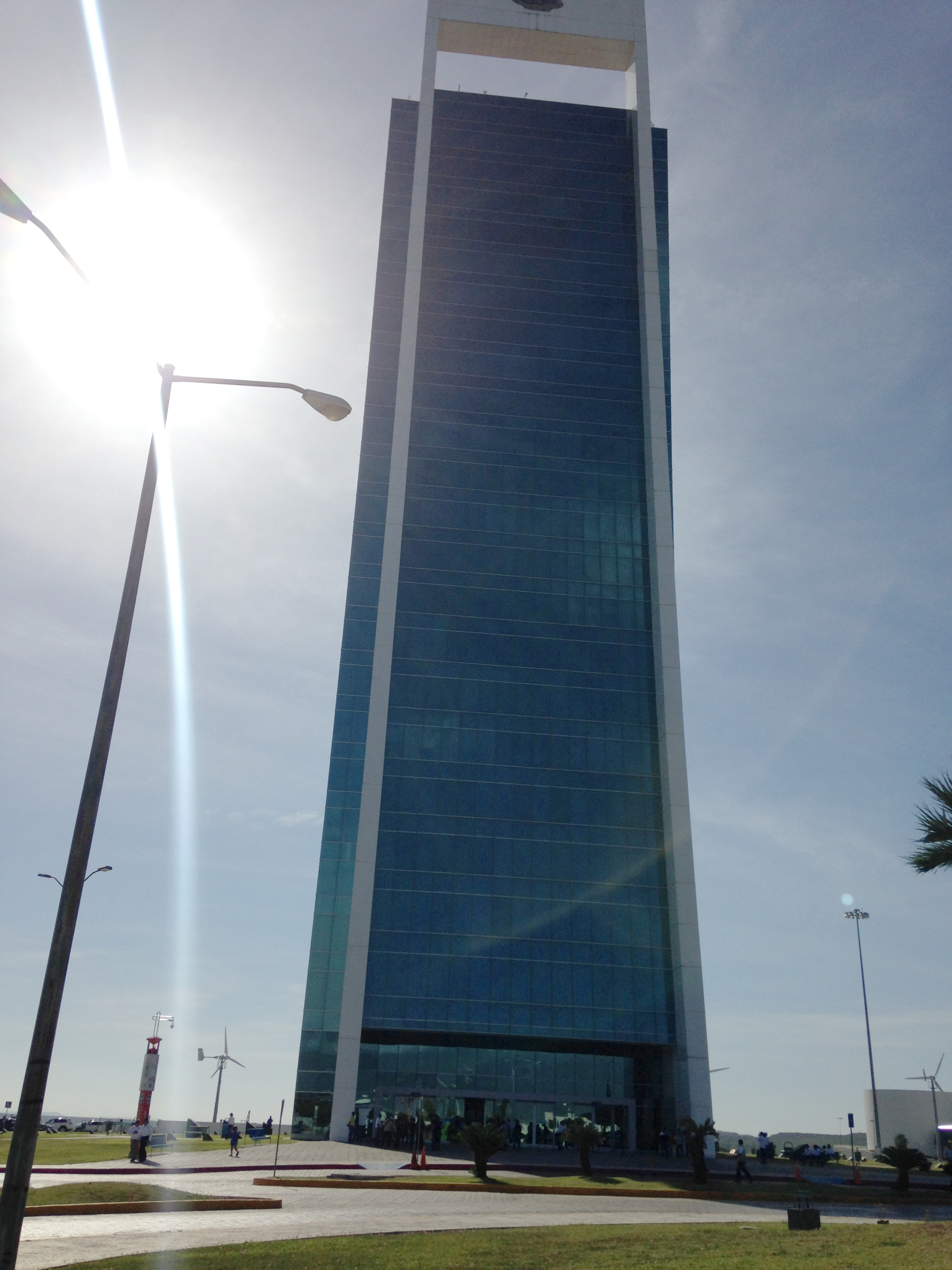
Government complex built in 2010

The early morning of 1 July 2010, the city was hit by Hurricane Alex whose eye passed only a few kilometres from Ciudad Victoria, causing destruction in public lighting, billboards, traffic lights and an infinity of trees, as well as suspension of energy services electricity and drinking water for more than 24 hours.

In 2010, the Governmental Complex "Bicentennial Park" came into operation, which today concentrates most of the government apparatus of the state of Tamaulipas. In 2016, the restoration of the old Casa Filizola, now the Pinacoteca Tamaulipas and the main railway station of the capital, began.

== Coat of arms ==
Ciudad Victoria coat of arms

The coat of arms was created on 18 December 1971, at the initiative of Professor Vidal Martínez. The coat of arms has the following characteristics: On the side the map of the state that represents that Victoria is the capital, the balance, the sword and the parchment represent the three powers; the book symbolizes education and the torch the light of freedom, the date is the historical antecedent of the foundation, the landscape symbolizes the geographic environment of the region upon the arrival of the founders, henequen plants represent agricultural production.

== Politics ==
The municipality was recognized as the official capital of the state of Tamaulipas, and named Ciudad Victoria in 1825, and the head of the municipality of Victoria is finally assigned the seat of the Legislative, Executive and Judicial powers.

In state matter, the seat of the organisms and dependencies of the government of the state and the official residence of the governor of the state are in Ciudad Victoria. The current governor is Francisco Javier García Cabeza de Vaca, of the National Action Party, for the 2016-2022 administration.

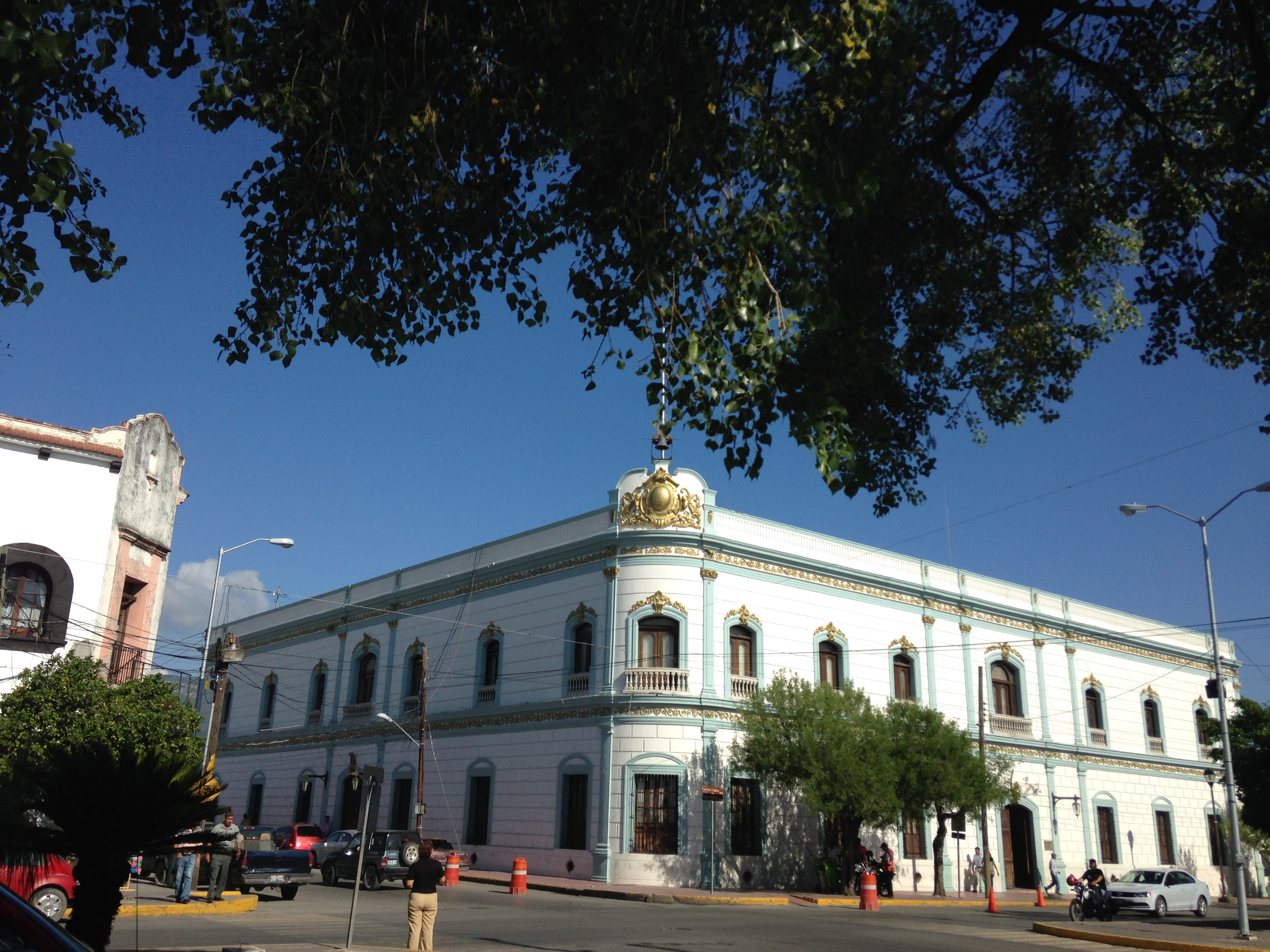
Building of the City Council of Ciudad Victoria

The municipality is administered by the Ciudad Victoria City Council, comprised by the Municipal President, being the holder María del Pilar Gómez Leal, of the National Action Party as Substitute Municipal President of Victoria for the administration 2018-2021 since 2 October 2020.

It consists of two syndics, fourteen council members and delegates. Among the tasks of the municipal administration are: The Municipal Statistical Register, civil protection, health, alcoholic beverages regulations, drinking water services, drainage and sewerage, as well as public safety, traffic and roads.

According to the National Electoral Institute (INE) and the State Electoral Institute of Tamaulipas (IEETAM), the voter registry is: 252,852 inhabitants, belongs to the 15th electoral district of the state and fifth federally of the state of Tamaulipas.

== Demography ==
=== Population ===
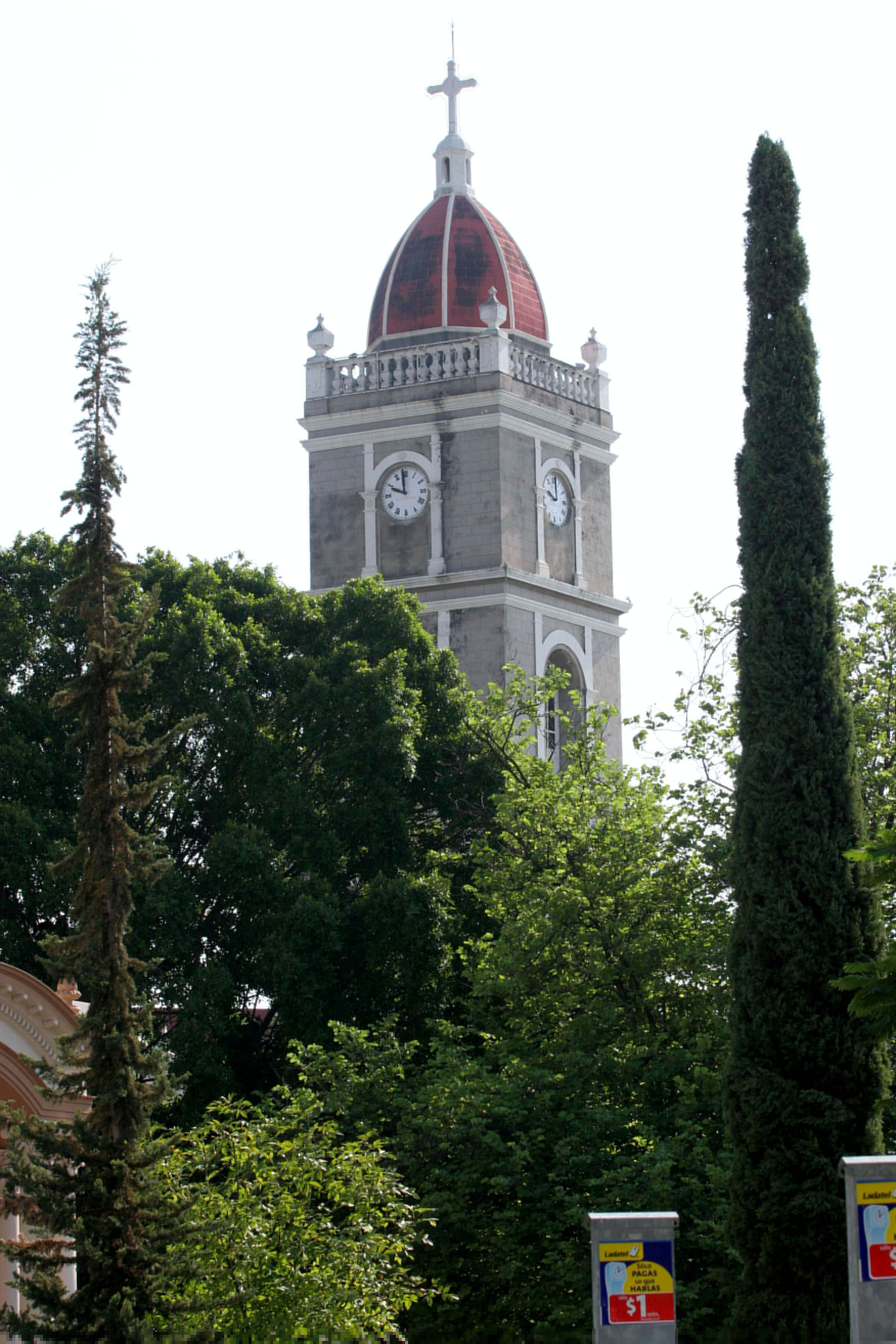
Cathedral of Our Lady of Refuge, Ciudad Victoria

According to the National Institute of Statistics and Geography (INEGI), in the Population and Housing Count conducted in 2010, Ciudad Victoria had until that year a population of 446,029 inhabitants of which: 264,801 are women and 157,152 are men. The municipality of Victoria concentrates 94.7% of the population in its municipal seat, the rest is considered rural and has experienced a growth rate of 2.04%.

In 2010, CONAPO estimated, based on INEGI, a level of marginalization of 36.7% as very low, 25% low level and from 1.3% to 0.3% with levels between high and very high marginalization.

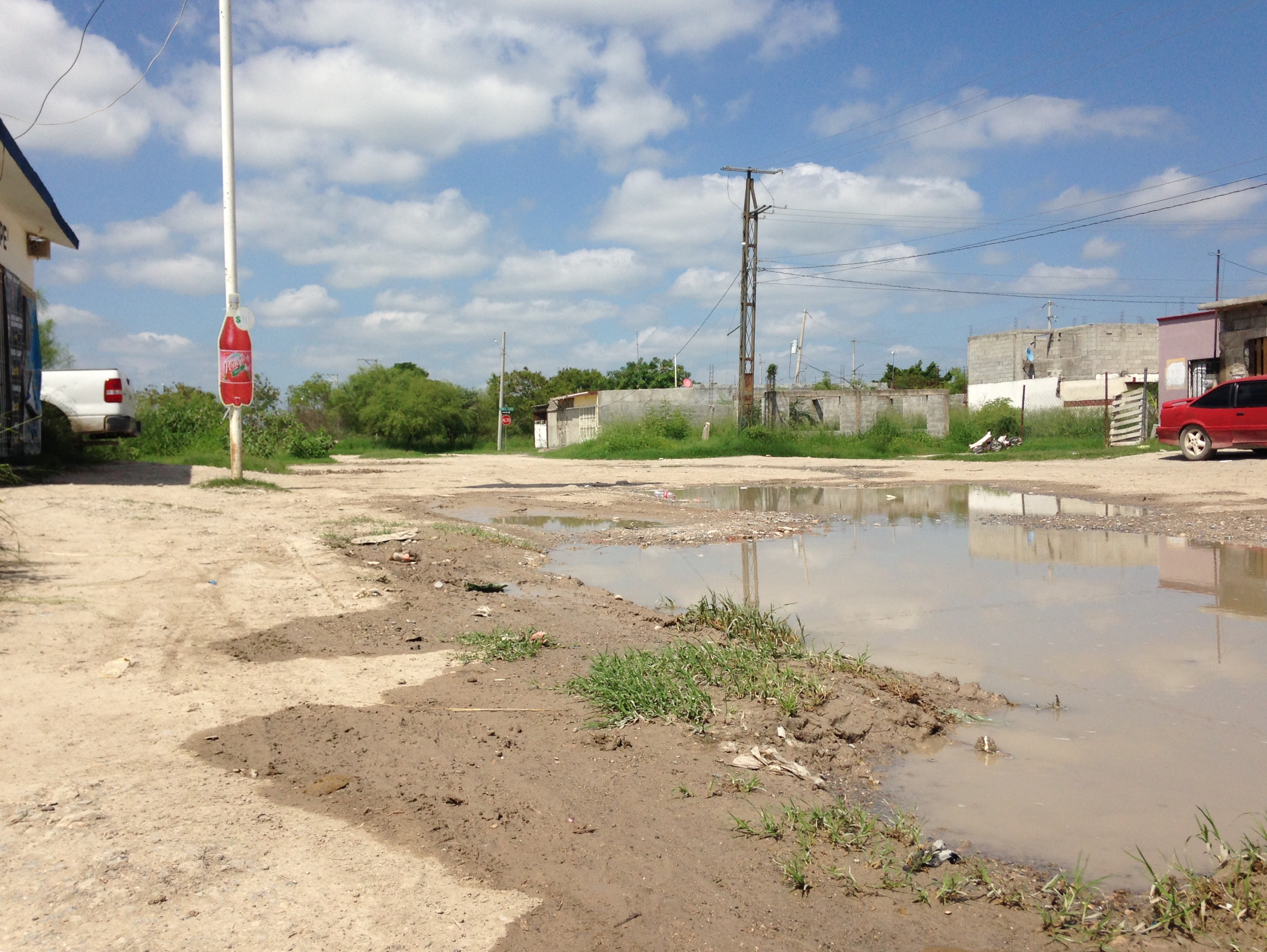
Marginalized area of Ciudad Victoria

According to the INEGI intercensal survey, in 2015, 52% of the population of Ciudad Victoria were women and the population density was 211 people per square kilometre.

Ciudad Victoria has one of the highest per capita murder rates in the world.

=== Religion ===
As for religion, 90% of its population declares itself Christian Catholic, while 5% Christian Protestants, 2% Jews, and 3% other religion or none being the most Catholic city of State. On 12 December, various parties and events are held in the Sanctuary in honour of the Virgin of Guadalupe, the celebration includes dances of matachines, folk verbena and pyrotechnic games.

== Education ==
Ciudad Victoria has a wide range of educational institutions, from preschool to graduate level. The level of illiteracy has dropped and the level of education at the top level is 3.7% of the population.

In the city there are 57 special education schools; basic education includes 46 pre-school schools, 168 pre-schools, 175 primary schools, 55 secondary schools; the upper middle level has 46 baccalaureates and 3 middle level professionals. There are 37 higher education institutions, including educational training centres such as ITACE and several special education schools.

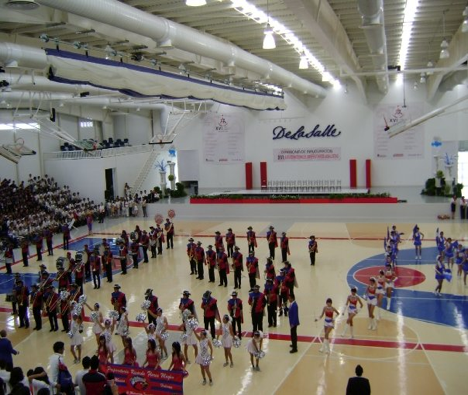
Gymnasium of La Salle University

The BPCE library "Marte R. Gómez" is the most well-known library in the centre of the city. The state capital has several libraries, among which are: The Adaberto J. Arguelles Municipal Public Library and Ernesto Higuera, the Public Library Tamaulipas Municipal Cultural Centre, the Municipal Public Library Youth Coexistence Centre 2, the Municipal Public Library of Ciudad Victoria, the Municipal Public Library FOVISSSTE-SEP, in addition to the Municipal Public Library Tamaulipas Regional History Museum and the Paul Harris Municipal Public Library.

=== Higher education ===
The city is the main headquarters of the Autonomous University of Tamaulipas (UAT), founded in 1950, a public institution with more than 40,000 students in upper secondary, higher and postgraduate levels.

The Technological Institute of Ciudad Victoria (ITCV) was the first technological institution in the centre of the state, began its activities in 1975. It has more than 3,113 students, offers undergraduate, engineering and postgraduate careers.

La Salle Victoria University (ULSA) is a private Catholic institution with students in the upper and upper secondary levels; It covers fields of engineering, science and humanities and has a health campus.

In 2007, the Polytechnic University of Victoria (UPV) was inaugurated, part of the Technological and Polytechnic Universities of Mexico, located within the TECNOTAM Scientific and Technological Park. It offers engineering, postgraduate and distance education.

The Centre for Research and Advanced Studies (CINVESTAV) of the National Polytechnic Institute has an Information Technology laboratory in its Tamaulipas unit, within the TECNOTAM Park.

Among the schools of teacher training has: The Benemérita Normalized Federalized School of Tamaulipas (BENFT), the Normal School of Tamaulipas (ESNT) and the Normal School of Educators (ENFE).

Other institutions of higher education are: The University of the Valley of Mexico (UVM), the Vizacaya University of the Americas, are universities in the private sector. There are also the Institute of Sciences and Higher Studies of Tamaulipas (ICEST), the National Pedagogical University (Mexico) (UPN), the University of North Tamaulipas (UNT), the Centre for University Studies (CEU).

The Miguel Aleman University is a private institution of superior and middle level that was established in the state capital in September 2005 after twenty-five years since its founding in 1981, of philanthropic and humanitarian principles offering university studies in accounting, economic areas, social, and educational.

== Infrastructure and transport ==
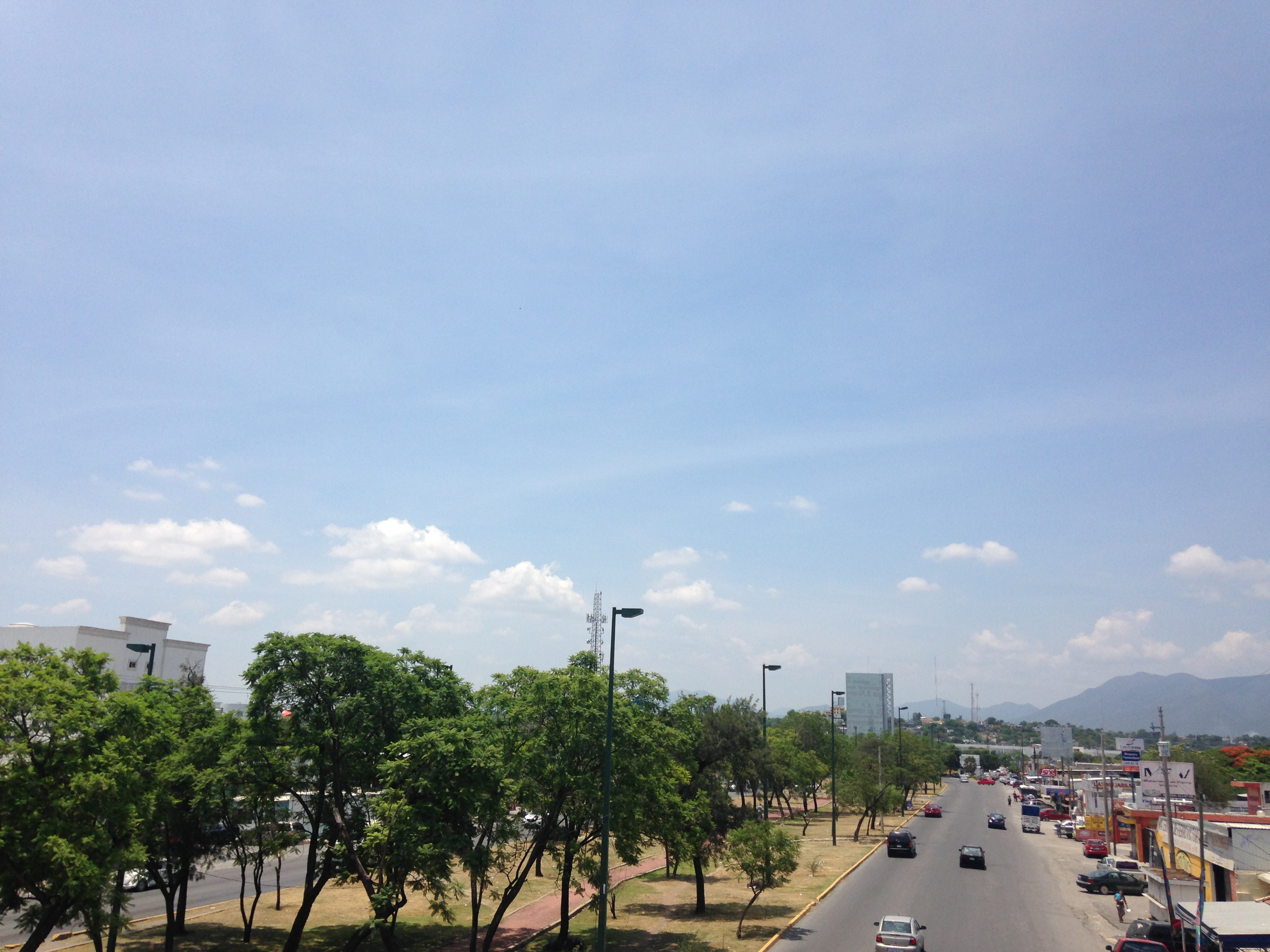
Avenue in Ciudad Victoria

There are 32 urban routes that circulate in the city and nearby ejidos in the surroundings, being mini-buses and buses the most used public transport, a taxi service, and school transport of the main universities, and the Pedro J. Méndez Airport, located at the outskirts of the city. Almost 59% of the urban roads have some type of paving, where the downtown sector of the city covers 95% of the roads.

The city has a bus station and terminals of several companies. The usual destinations of the bus station are Monterrey, Tampico, Altamira, North of Veracruz, Tamazunchale, Valles, Reynosa, Saltillo, Matamoros, Mante and Soto la Marina.

The main avenues and most of the traffic are Av. Alberto Carrera Torres, Francisco I. Madero Ave., Emilio Portes Gil Boulevard, Blvr. Adolfo López Mateos, Av. Rotaria, Av. Carlos Adrián Aviles, Calzada Gral. Luis Caballero, Práxedis Balboa Boulevard, as well as the road to Soto la Marina. The federal highways Mexico 81 and Mexico 80 connect with Altamira, Tampico and Madero. The city also has pedestrian bridges, six bridges for cars that cross the San Marcos River and a road hump to the west of the city.

There is an airport serving the city, Ciudad Victoria International Airport, which, as of 2021, was being served by Aeromar on the passenger airline side and Aeronaves TSM on the cargo airline side.

== Local media ==
The city has telegraph offices (which provide banking services, collection of third parties, telegram services, money transfer services) and post offices to send and receive parcels, letters and postcards, these are operated by the Mexican Post Office.

In Ciudad Victoria, the analogue blackout was made on 31 December 2015. The open digital terrestrial television signals offered are: XHCTVI-TDT Imagen Television, XHCVT-TDT Azteca Uno and ADN 40, XHCVI-TDT Nueve, XHCDT-TDT Azteca 7, XHTK-TDT Las Estrellas, XHUT-TDT Canal 5 and XHVTU-TDT that includes the signals of Multimedios Television, Milenio Televisión, TeleRitmo and 52MX.

The AM and FM radio stations in the city include: XEVIC-AM and XHVIC-FM Radio Tamaulipas, owned by the State Government; XHUNI-FM Radio UAT, operated by the Autonomous University of Tamaulipas; XHLRS-FM La Lupe; XETAM-AM and FM Romantica, XHHP-FM the hottest, XHGW-FM Imagen Radio, XHVIR-FM The Cotorra, XHRPV-FM The Victoria V, XHBJ-FM Exa FM.

The written or printed press is covered by some local and regional media such as: The Journal of Ciudad Victoria, which registered an average circulation of 14,270 daily copies in 2014. The "Mercurio" of Tamaulipas, a newspaper that sold an average circulation in 2014 of 19,615 daily copies and 21,286 copies.

== Culture ==
Ciudad Victoria has several tourist spots such as museums, zoological parks, green and natural areas.

=== "Tamatán" Zoo ===
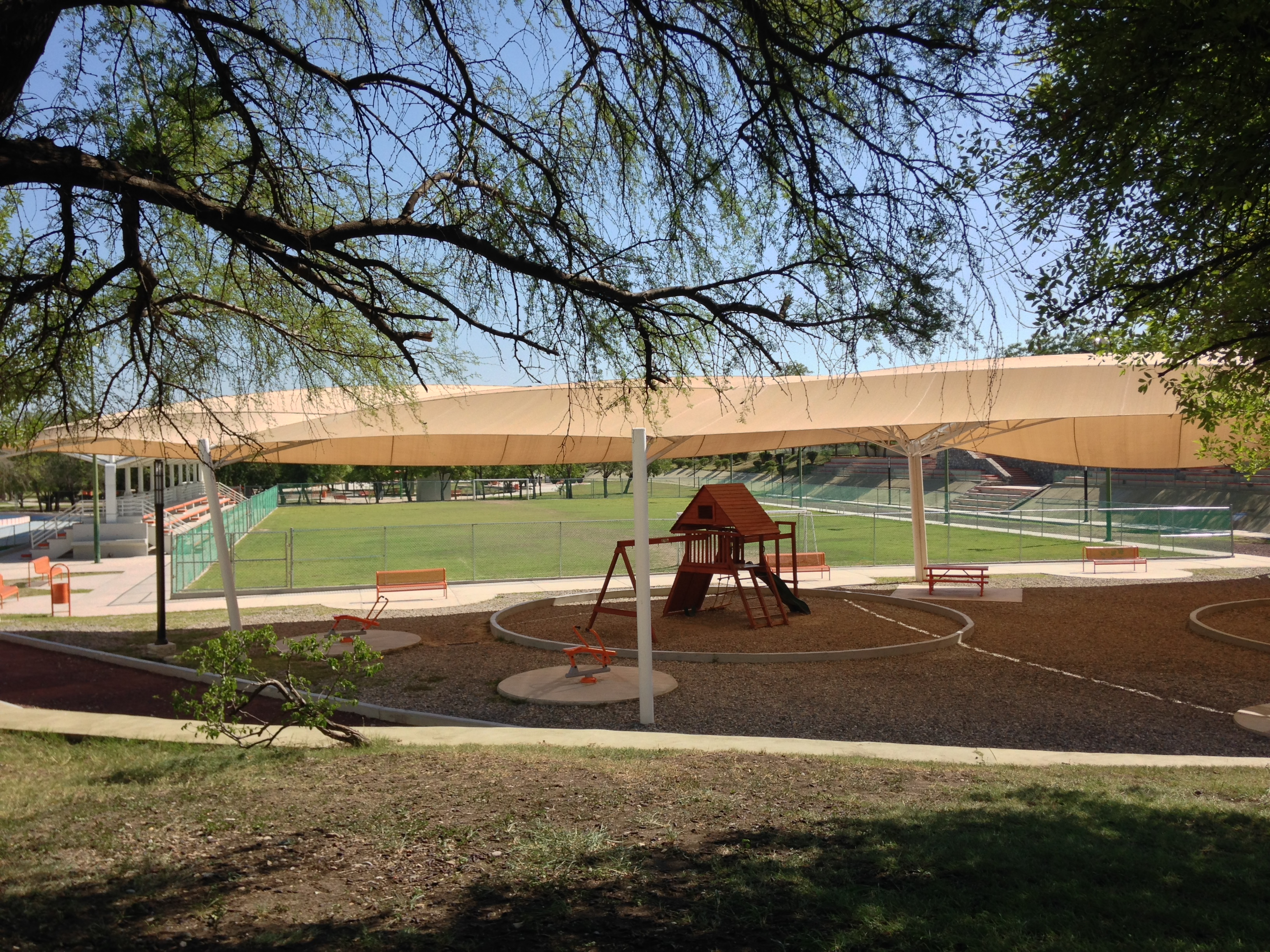
Recreative zone inside Sporting Unit Siglo XXI in Ciudad Victoria

A zoo that has areas dedicated to the species of the animal world. With a variety of species and even educational talks, it is an important part of tourism in the capital, a zoo designed to encourage conservation and respect for nature. Organized in 5 regions, it presents the different species in open spaces. Surrounded by a naturalistic environment, with vegetation, rocks and waterfalls.

=== 21st Century Cultural and Recreational Park ===
It has an area dedicated to games for children, a football field, several swimming pools. In this space is the Planetarium and the Tamux Museum, as well as the Botanical Garden and a green area known as the Urban Forest for walking and jogging.

=== Tamatán Recreational Park ===
The park offers various outdoor activities. A space of green areas and bodies of water, playgrounds and restaurant; located in lands of the ex-hacienda Tamatán.

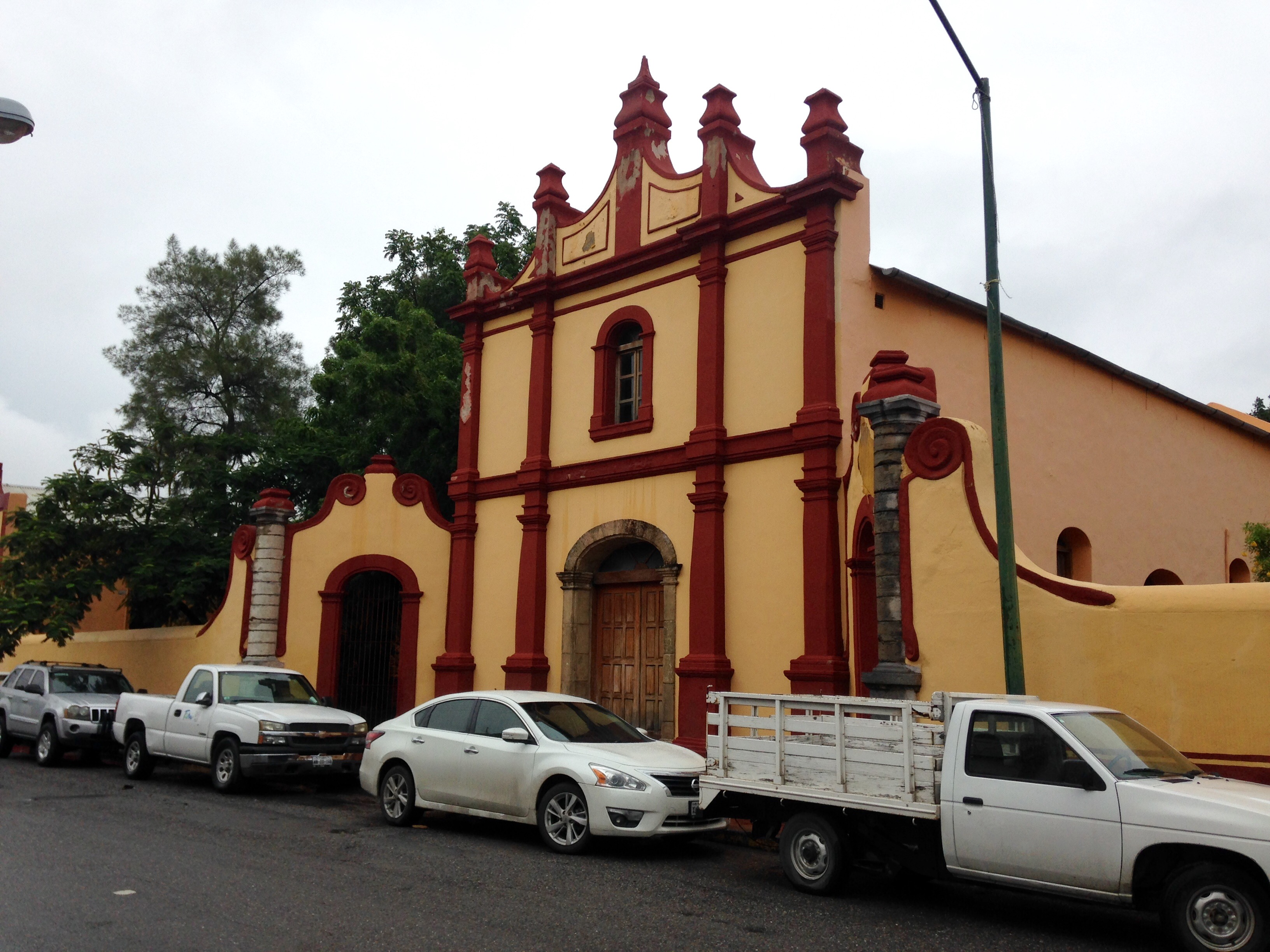
Regional History Museum

=== Los Troncones Ecological Park ===
Located in the foothills of the Sierra Madre Oriental, in the Ejido La Libertad, it is a tourist and ecological centre. It is a recreational park surrounded by vegetation with a stream, waterfalls and flora and fauna. It is equipped with grills, gardens and children's games.

=== Dr. Ramiro Iglesias Leal Planetarium ===
In 1992, the Planetarium of Ciudad Victoria was inaugurated, one of the scientific and technological spreading centres in the North and Northeast of the Federal Republic; projects documentaries and scientific talks to the public. He was assigned the name "Dr. Ramiro Iglesias Leal ", Tamaulipas scientist, from 30 January 1998.

=== Tamaulipas Cultural Centre ===
It is a cultural space that houses a public library, the Amalia G. de Castillo Ledon theatre, a cinema and several auditoriums for exhibitions and presentations of cultural and artistic activities such as dance, music presentations, sculpture, painting, literature and theatre.

=== Museum of Natural History of Tamaulipas TAMUX ===
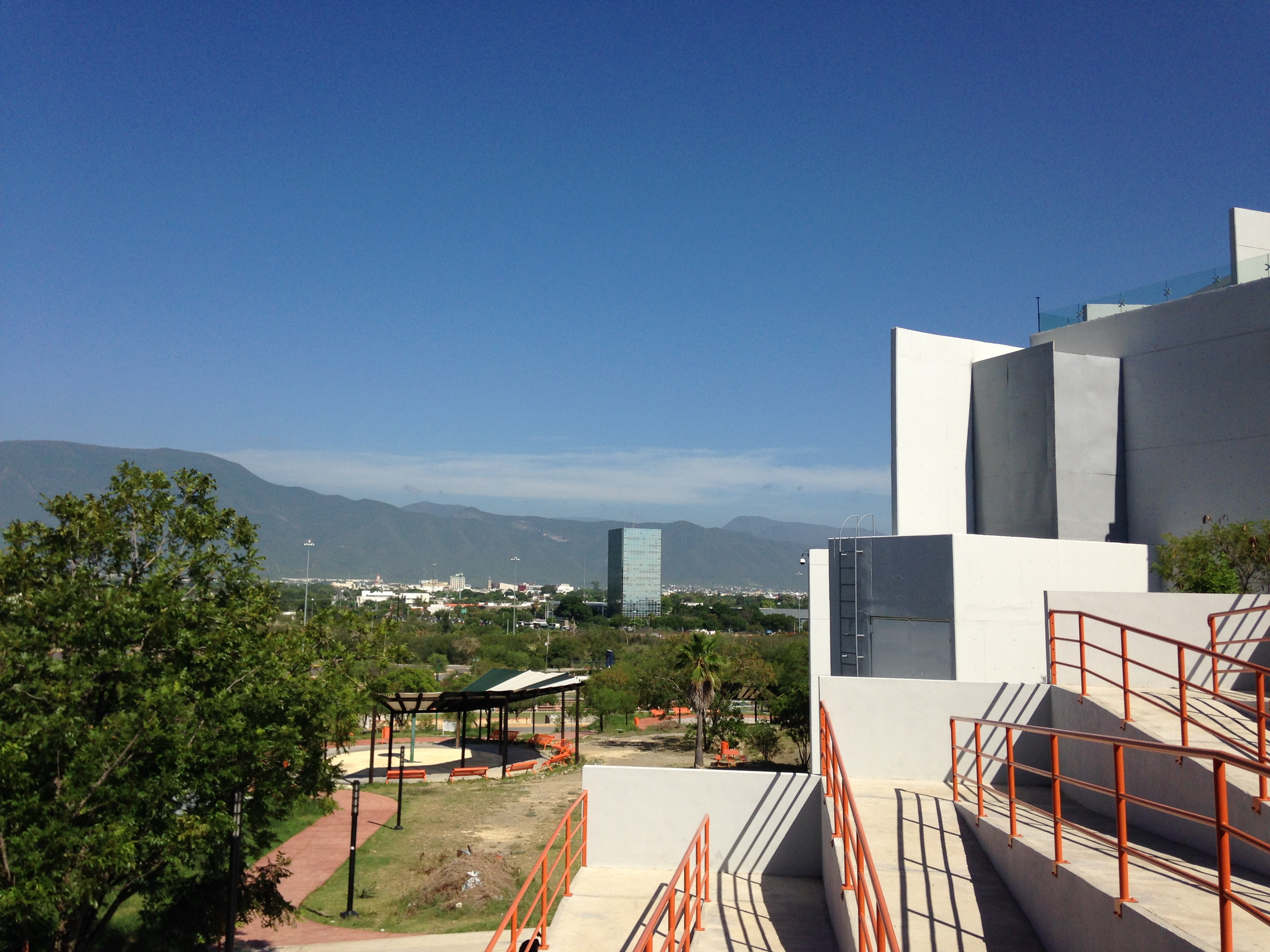
TAMUX

The Museum of Natural History of Tamaulipas, also known as "TAMUX", began activities in February 2004, dedicated to scientific dissemination, nature, space and promoting culture in favour of biodiversity. When the museum was founded, the planetarium of Ciudad Victoria "Dr. Ramiro Iglesias Leal ", in operation since 1992, became part of it. The name of the museum, "TAMUX", is a Huastec word that means "meeting point". In addition to the thematic rooms, it has been the venue for the presentation of scientific conferences and videos; room for temporary exhibitions, for plastic and scientific exhibitions; and an open-air theatre (acoustic shell).

=== Regional Museum of History of Tamaulipas ===
The construction of the Former Vicentino Asylum, today Tamaulipas Regional Museum of History, was initiated at the end of the 19th century when Governor of the State of Tamaulipas Lic. Guadalupe Mainero, at the request of Mr. Filemón Fierro Terán, Third Bishop of the Diocese of Tamaulipas. As of 12 February 2003, this museum began operations offering visitors a sample of the state's cultural heritage. It has hosted many national and international exhibitions.

=== House of Art ===
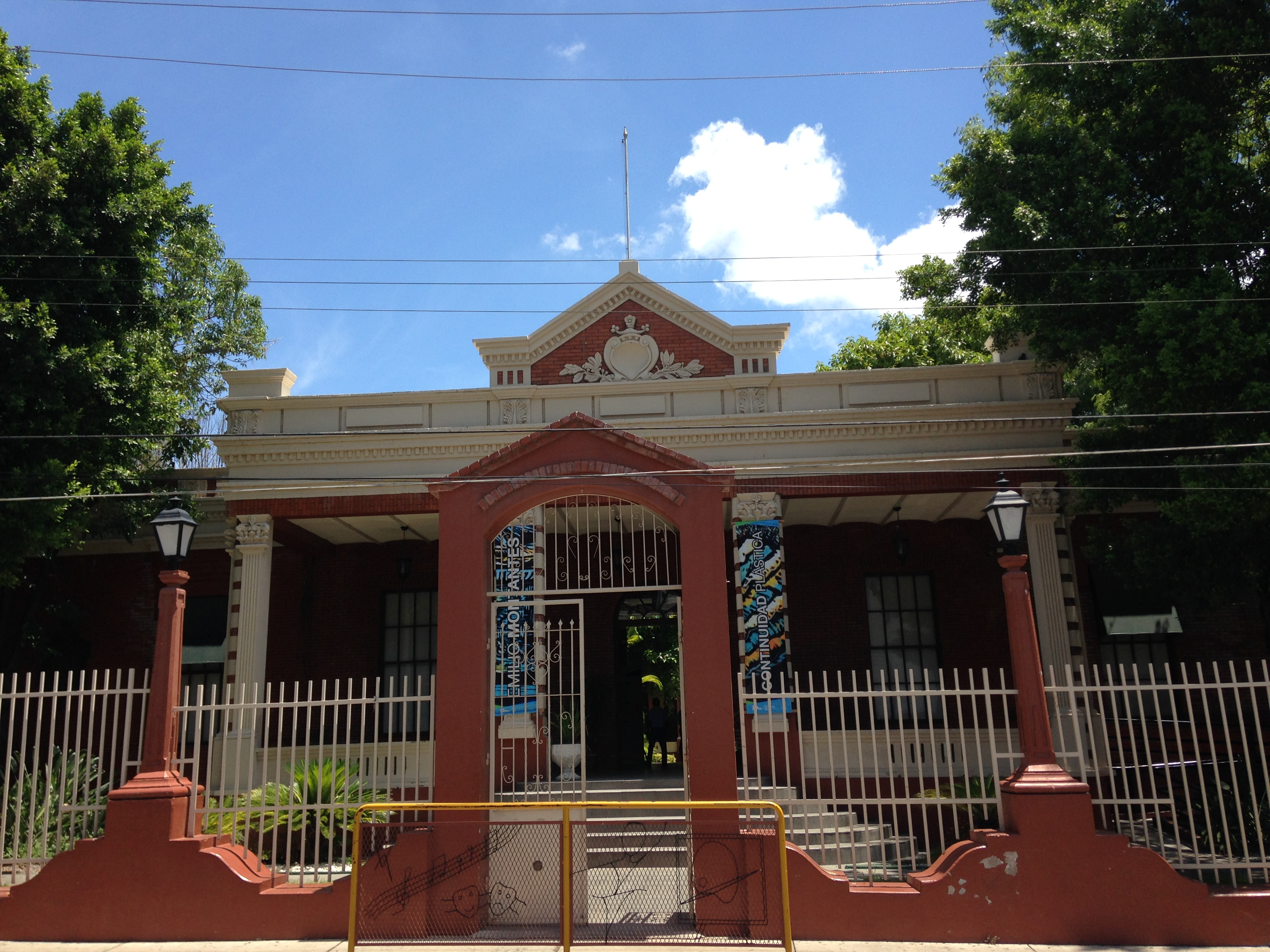
House of Art

The House of Art began its construction in 1911, where it was installed what was the Normal School for Teachers attached and kindergarten. In 1962 the Institute of Youth and Women was created, in 1974 it was called the Tamaulipas Institute of Fine Arts.

In 1980 it takes the name of Tamaulipas Institute for Culture and the Arts. In 2011, it became an administrative unit under the ITCA, providing courses and workshops for various cultural disciplines that allow students to develop artistic skills, promote and disseminate cultural activities in the community. Now the disciplines of music, dance, plastic arts and literature and theatre are taught.

=== Juarez Theatre ===
A theatre that houses the Institute of Historical Research under the administration of the Autonomous University of Tamaulipas. It was inaugurated on 5 January 1957, by President Adolfo Ruiz Cortines as Governor Horacio Terán Zumaya. The building encloses a mural by the Tampico painter Alfonso Xavier Peña.

=== Tamaulipas International Festival ===
During the month of October, the state of Tamaulipas celebrates the Tamaulipas International Festival in each of its municipalities. In this festival musical and cultural events are held, such as concerts by artists such as: opera, plays, etc.

=== Cultural events ===
The city has a family and cultural space called Libre 17, which corresponds to the closing on Sundays of Avenida Francisco I. Madero street in the centre of the city, where local families and tourists can walk on foot, bicycle, and witness musical and cultural events.

=== Bicentennial Park ===
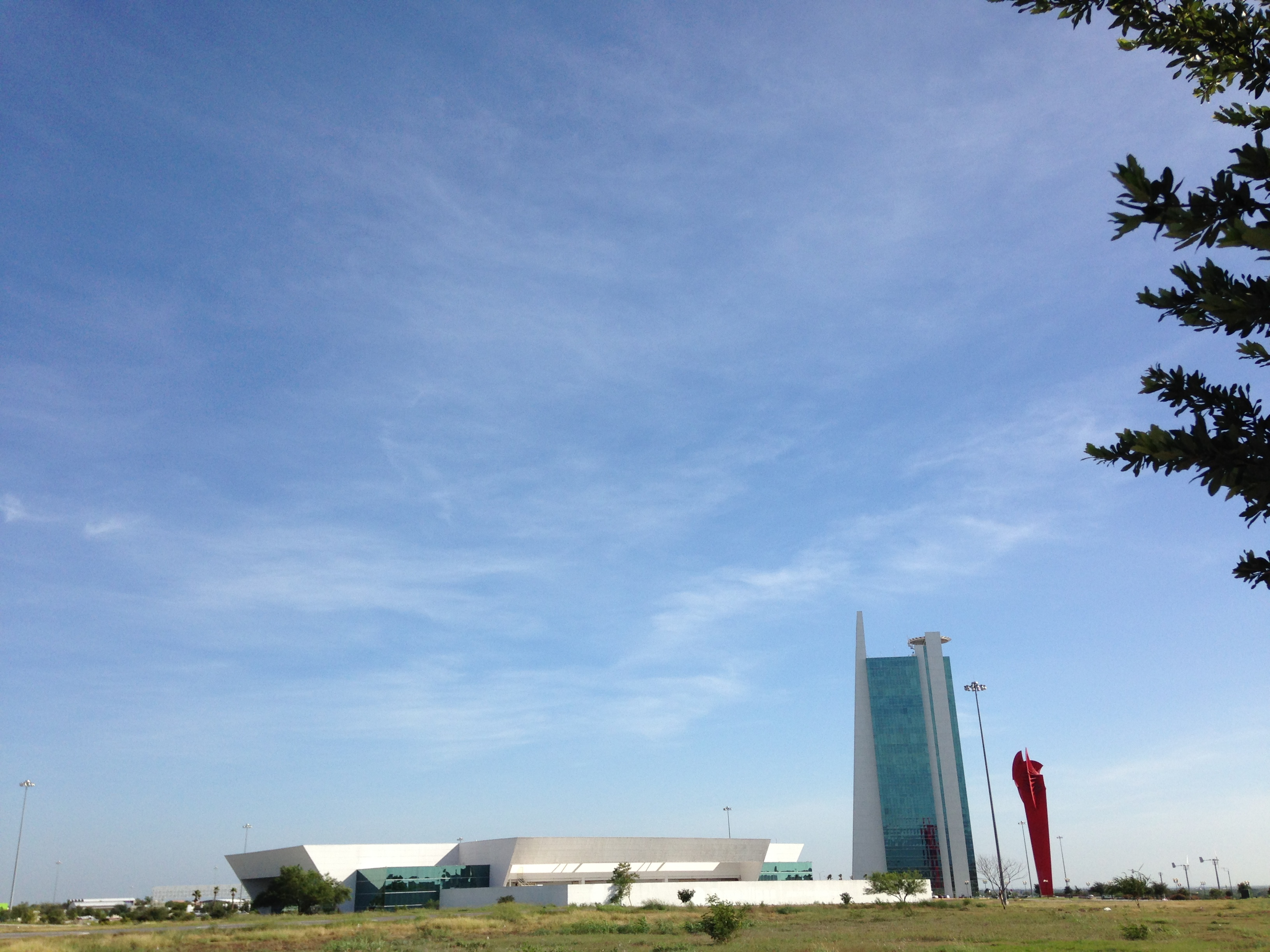
Bicentennial Park

The park is an area that concentrates the offices of the government of the state, the fairground that consists of the land of the fair, the centre of spectacles and the Polyforum.

=== Tamaulipas Fair ===
It is a cultural event held annually in the capital, where in addition to the classic mechanical games, it has the presence of stands of all municipalities of the state of Tamaulipas, exhibiting their culture and cuisine and usually have a state of the federation guest; It has events such as concerts held by national artists.

The centre of spectacles that is inside the fairground of the Bicentennial Park, was inaugurated on 14 November 2008. And there have been several artists, bands and national groups.

=== Polyforum Dr Rodolfo Torre Cantu ===
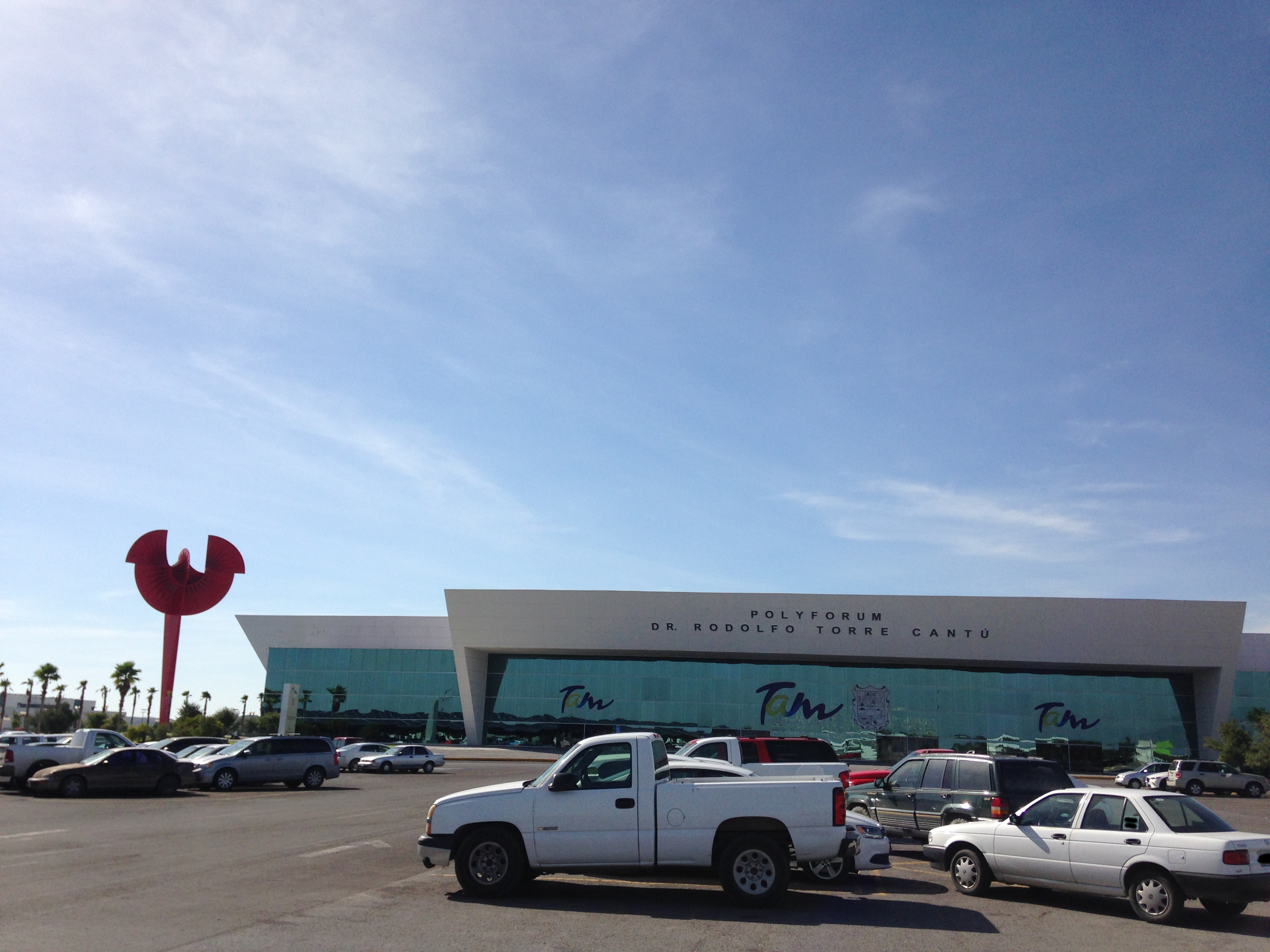
Polyforum Dr. Rodolfo Torre Cantú

It is a convention centre that was originally called "Polyforum Victoria", and it is in the Bicentennial Park and was inaugurated in December 2009; its interior can be divided into several independent rooms and has the capacity to comfortably accommodate 5,000 people with 12 250m² of construction with a main hall of 5000m².

== Public services ==
=== Drinking water and drainage ===
The Municipal Commission for Drinking Water and Sewerage of Ciudad Victoria (COMAPA), is a public body of the Municipal Administration that provides services to the city; among its attributions are those of: planning, programming, studying, projecting, budgeting, constructing, rehabilitating, expanding, operating, managing, conserving and improving potable water and sewage systems, as well as the treatment of wastewater and the rejection of According to COMAPA, there is 90.90% of domestic use (residential houses and residential areas), 7.32% of commercial use (businesses and self-service stores), 1.38% of public use (green areas, plazas, etc.) and a 0.40% for industrial use, with an installed treatment capacity of 1,100 litres per second, and an annual treatment volume of 25, 179, 604 cubic meters.

=== Electric infrastructure ===
The state capital has 97.50% of its population with access to electricity, being almost on par with the national average in the area. The street lighting network comprises a total of 29,100 luminaries (as of October 2016) of which only 10,800 are in operation, the rest are out of service. The service oversees the Federal Electricity Commission (CFE) Gulf Centre Division.

=== Hygiene ===
The collection of garbage in the capital is covered by several routes that cover the city, it is a service provided by the municipality, there are no concession services, it is estimated that the total average garbage generated per day is 370 tons (to October 2016), despite this, the daily collection capacity is 200 tons.

=== Health ===
Health coverage is covered by state institutions, Popular Insurance and Mexican Social Security Institute. It is the second city in the state in medical care by inhabitants, and the population that does not have immediate access to health services is 11.8%. The state of Tamaulipas has health services, both public and private, among which are:

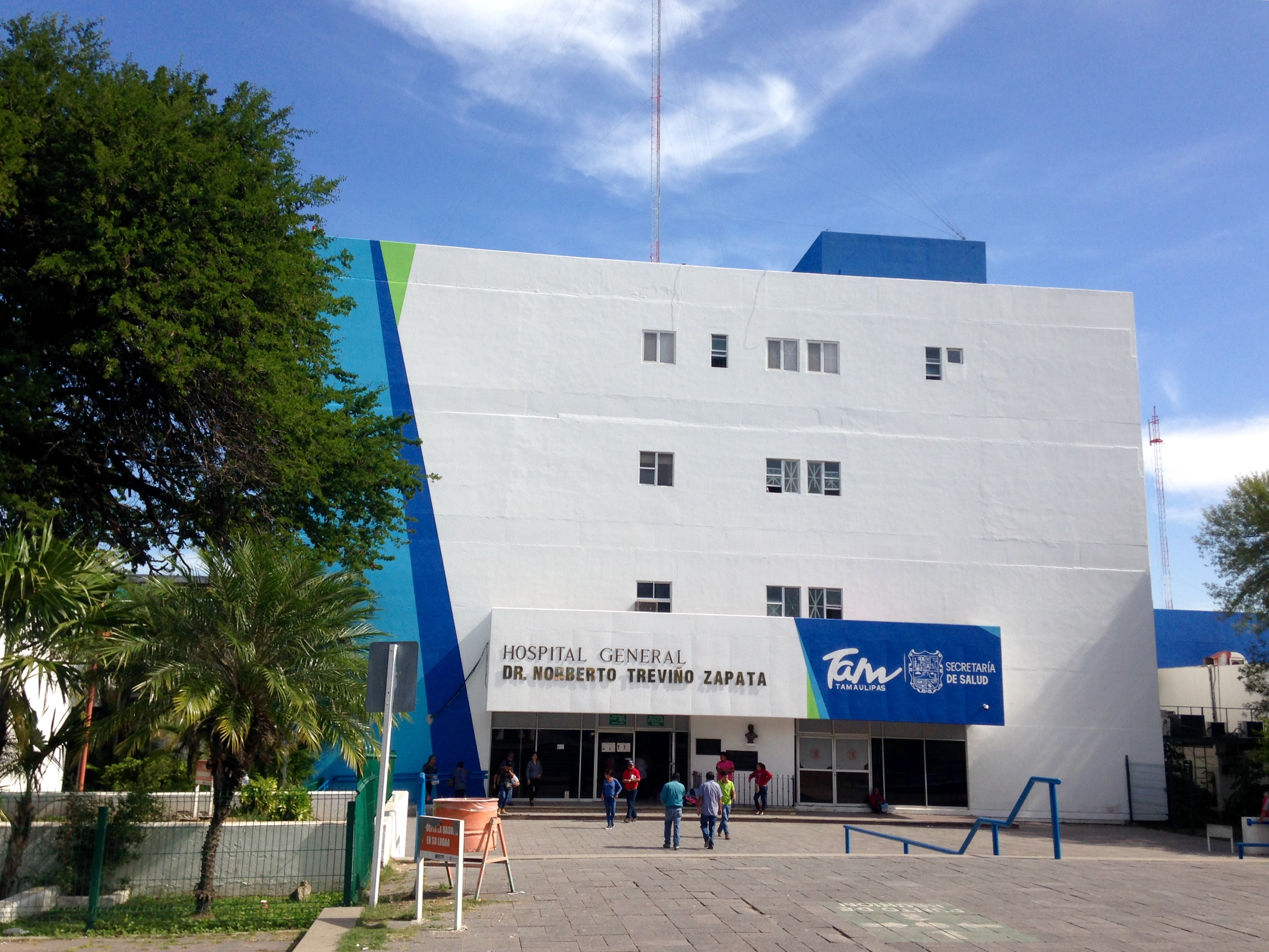
Dr. Norberto Treviño Zapata General Hospital

General Victoria Hospital. Provides health services in the downtown area of Tamaulipas and medical care around Sanitary Jurisdiction No. 1; Children's Hospital of Ciudad Victoria; Victoria Civil Hospital; High Specialty Regional Hospital of Ciudad Victoria; which provides professional, surgical and nursing services in several specialties; La Salle Hospital Ciudad Victoria; North Medical Clinic; Clinic Hospital of the Institute of Security and Social Services of State Workers; General Hospital of Zone No. 1 (IMSS) Medical Educational Unit of "Adolfo López Mateos"; Family Medicine Unit No. 67 (IMSS) San Luisito.

=== Sports ===
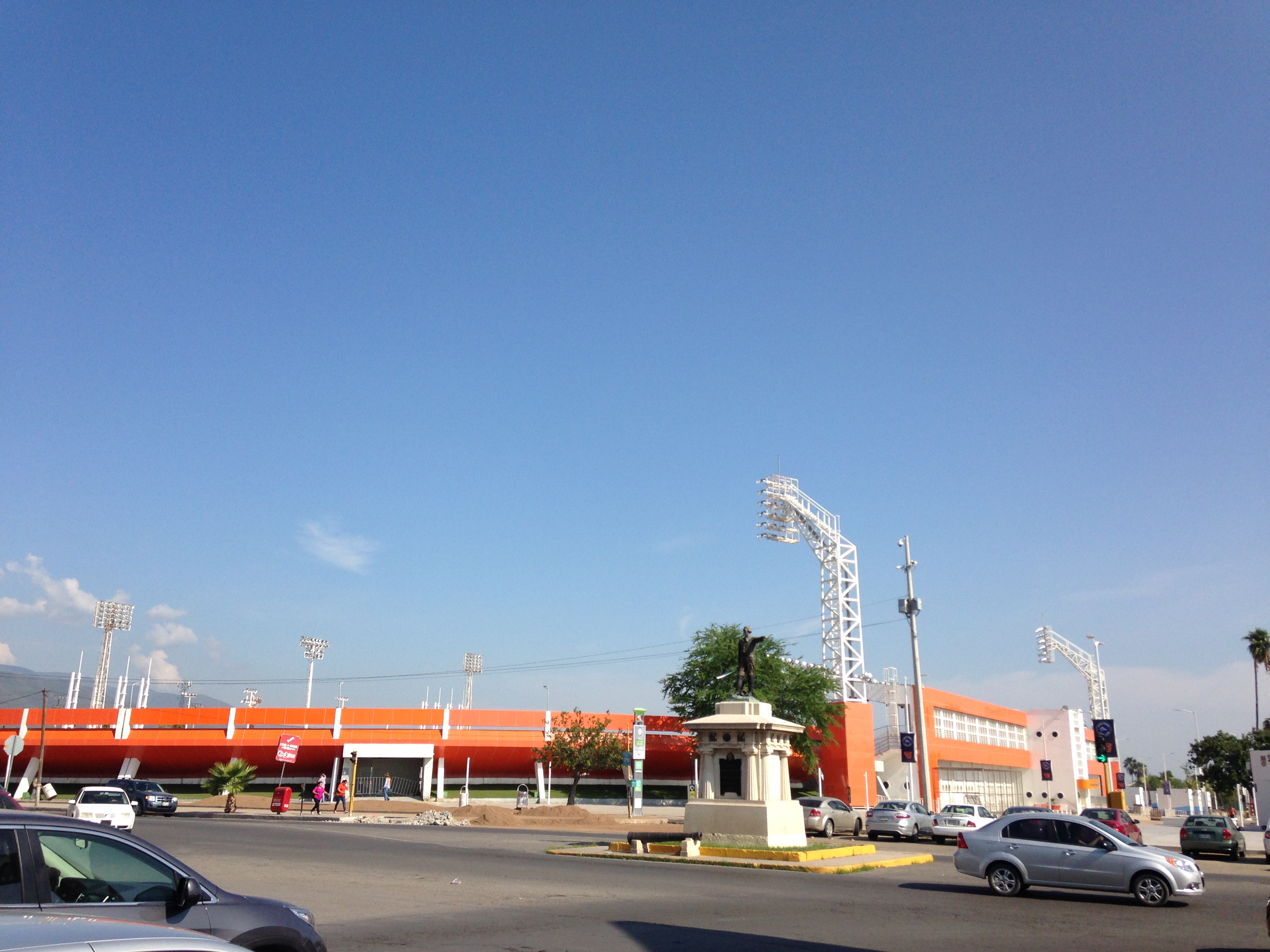
Marte R. Gomez Stadium

In Ciudad Victoria there is a varied sporting activity; In the field of professional football, the team of the Correcaminos of the Autonomous University of Tamaulipas stands out and carries out its official matches at the Marte R. Gómez Stadium, located in the city centre, with a capacity to house 10,520 people and the University Stadium Eugenio Alvizo Porras, located in the Victoria University Centre of the Autonomous University of Tamaulipas.

In the sports unit Adolfo Ruiz Cortinez there are facilities for practicing football, volleyball and indoor gymnasium for basketball. This sports complex also houses a baseball stadium.

The Sports Centre of Ciudad Victoria, with the name of "Américo Villareal Guerra", is a sports centre that has spaces for gymnastics, fencing, weightlifting, diving, swimming, athletics, boxing, judo, archery and basketball, and It is focused to be used mainly by high performance athletes with the intention of representing the state of Tamaulipas in national sporting events.

=== Gastronomy ===
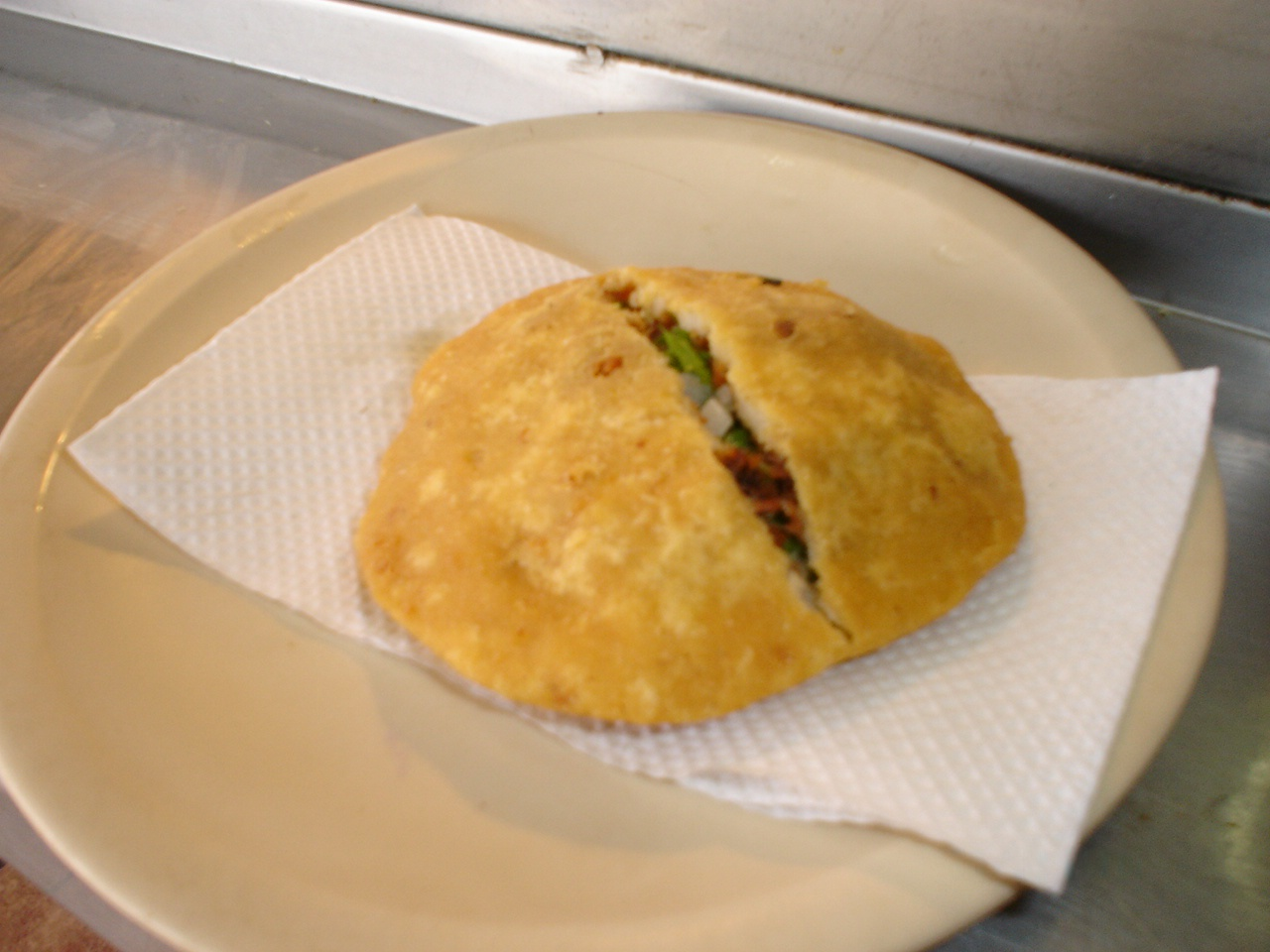
Gordita

The gastronomy of Ciudad Victoria is composed of three main elements: meat, corn and seafood; In addition to grilled meat, dried meat and chorizo. One of the most typical foods of the city are the gorditas, these consist of small thick corn tortillas stuffed with shredded meat, nopales, scrambled eggs, beans, among other ingredients. It also has many restaurants focused on typical Mexican food, the well-known "taquito."

Desserts of the region are made with walnut, sweet potato, cocadas with pineapple and walnut, among others. Also crystallized fruits and gorditas sweetened with piloncillo.

== Geography ==
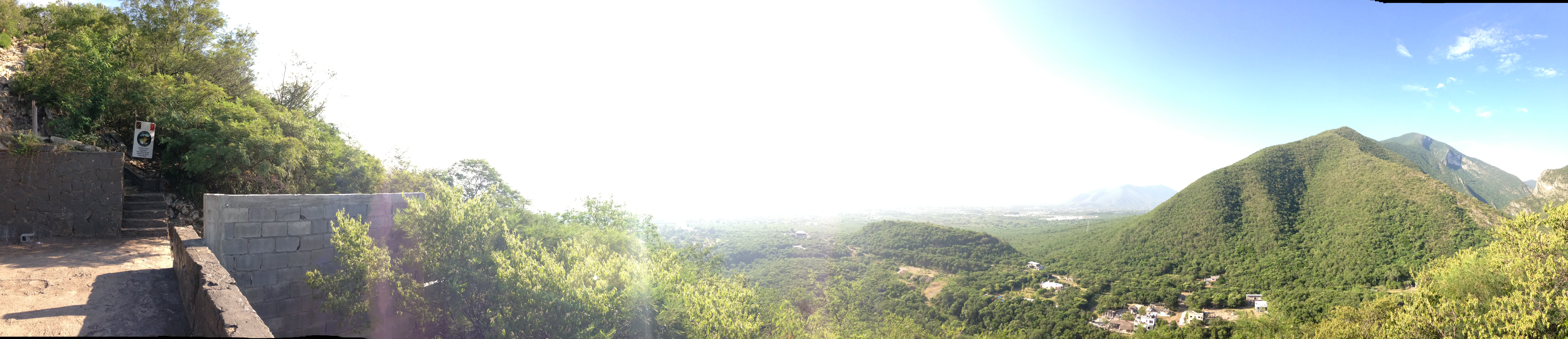
Panoramic from a viewpoint on a hill of the Sierra Madre Oriental in the Military Field of the 77th Infantry Battalion in Ciudad Victoria

Victoria is located 316 metres (1,037 ft) above sea level and at coordinates 23°44′N 99°8′W just north of the Tropic of Cancer. The city is in a valley between two mountain ranges: the Sierra Madre Oriental to the west and the Sierra de Tamaulipas to the east.

=== Climate ===
Ciudad Victoria has a climate on the border of humid subtropical (Köppen Cfa/Cwa) and hot semi-arid (BSh). Its weather is characterised by short warm winters and long hot to sweltering summers. Temperatures rarely drop below 0 °C (32 °F) — the lowest recorded temperature was −6 °C (21.2 °F) and the hottest was 48.5 °C (119.3 °F), one of the highest temperatures ever recorded in Mexico. The average annual rainfall is 740 millimetres or 29 inches, of which five-sixths (617 millimetres or 24.3 inches) falls between May and October, although there is a drying trend in the months of July and August. The moderate elevation adds to overall rainfall pattern, which is also influenced by exceptionally heavy rains brought by occasional North Atlantic tropical cyclones.

Climate data for Ciudad Victoria, Tamaulipas (1991–2020 normals, extremes 1951–present)
Month	Jan	Feb	Mar	Apr	May	Jun	Jul	Aug	Sep	Oct	Nov	Dec	Year
Record high °C (°F)	38.5 (101.3)	41.0 (105.8)	43.5 (110.3)	45.5 (113.9)	47.5 (117.5)	48.5 (119.3)	42.5 (108.5)	42.0 (107.6)	41.8 (107.2)	40.0 (104.0)	39.0 (102.2)	39.0 (102.2)	48.5 (119.3)
Mean daily maximum °C (°F)	24.3 (75.7)	26.9 (80.4)	30.6 (87.1)	33.2 (91.8)	34.9 (94.8)	35.3 (95.5)	35.1 (95.2)	35.6 (96.1)	32.8 (91.0)	30.1 (86.2)	27.2 (81.0)	24.7 (76.5)	31.4 (88.5)
Daily mean °C (°F)	17.5 (63.5)	19.5 (67.1)	23.0 (73.4)	25.7 (78.3)	28.1 (82.6)	28.9 (84.0)	28.7 (83.7)	29.0 (84.2)	27.2 (81.0)	24.2 (75.6)	20.8 (69.4)	18.2 (64.8)	24.0 (75.2)
Mean daily minimum °C (°F)	10.6 (51.1)	12.1 (53.8)	15.3 (59.5)	18.2 (64.8)	21.2 (70.2)	22.4 (72.3)	22.4 (72.3)	22.3 (72.1)	21.6 (70.9)	18.2 (64.8)	14.3 (57.7)	11.6 (52.9)	17.5 (63.5)
Record low °C (°F)	−6.0 (21.2)	−5.0 (23.0)	−1.0 (30.2)	4.0 (39.2)	10.5 (50.9)	12.5 (54.5)	8.0 (46.4)	10.5 (50.9)	6.0 (42.8)	4.5 (40.1)	−1.5 (29.3)	−6.0 (21.2)	−6.0 (21.2)
Average rainfall mm (inches)	17.8 (0.70)	13.9 (0.55)	19.1 (0.75)	26.2 (1.03)	74.8 (2.94)	114.4 (4.50)	60.1 (2.37)	75.3 (2.96)	156.4 (6.16)	72.8 (2.87)	32.1 (1.26)	37.3 (1.47)	700.4 (27.57)
Average rainy days (≥ 0.1 mm)	2.5	2.0	2.4	2.1	5.2	7.9	5.1	5.8	10.2	5.4	3.1	2.9	60.6
Average relative humidity (%)	73	69	67	68	72	70	67	68	73	75	76	75	71
Mean monthly sunshine hours	203	185	226	226	218	216	244	256	243	230	216	220	2,683
Source: Servicio Meteorológico Nacional

== Sister cities ==
The strategic alliances that are built with cities in the country and the United States contribute to the economic development of the capital, including twinning of the following:

- Matamoros, Mexico
- Reynosa, Mexico
- Tampico, Mexico
- Nuevo Laredo, Mexico
- Ciudad Mante, Mexico
- Monterrey, Nuevo León
- Chilpancingo, Guerrero
- McAllen, Texas (2008)
- San Luis Potosí, San Luis Potosí (2010)
- Mazatlán, Sinaloa (2014)

== Notable people ==
- Emilio Portes Gil, former governor of the state of Tamaulipas and former president of Mexico.
- Arleth Terán, Mexican television actress.
- Carlos Peña Rodríguez, professional football player
- Alan Pulido Izaguirre, professional football player.
- Oscar Mascorro, professional footballer
- José Sulaimán, businessman and boxer , co-founder of the World Boxing Council.
- Rosemary Barkett, Federal Judge of the United States of America Court of Appeals for the Eleventh Circuit.
- Rodolfo Torre Cantu, doctor and Mexican politician, former candidate for Governor of Tamaulipas.
- Ismael Valdez, Los Angeles Dodgers, Major League Baseball player, TV Personality and local entrepreneur.
- Eusebio L. Elizondo Almaguer, Auxiliary Bishop of the Archdiocese of Seattle.
