= José de Escandón, 1st Count of Sierra Gorda =

Spanish politician (1700–1770)

José de Escandón y Helguera, 1st Count of Sierra Gorda
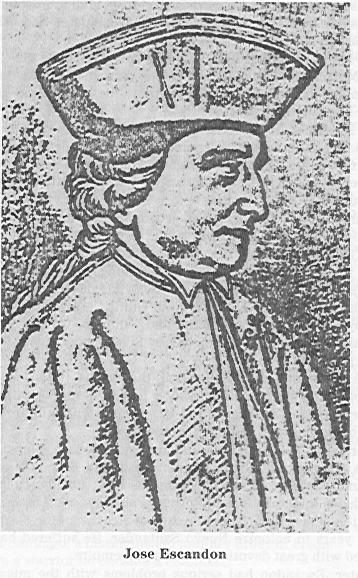
- Born: May 19, 1700; Soto de la Marina (now Santa Cruz de Bezana, Cantabria, Spain)
- Died: September 10, 1770 (aged 70); Santiago de Querétaro, New Spain (now Mexico)
- Occupations: Noble, soldier & politician

José de Escandón y Helguera, conde de Sierra (May 19, 1700, Soto de la Marina, Cantabria, Spain – September 10, 1770, Querétaro, New Spain) was a Spanish fighter against indigenous people in New Spain and the founder and first governor of the colony of Nuevo Santander, which extended from the Pánuco River in the modern-day Mexican state of Tamaulipas to the Guadalupe River in the modern-day U.S. state of Texas.

== Military career before Nuevo Santander ==
Escandón was one of three sons of Juan de Escandón and Francisca de la Helguera. He arrived in New Spain as a child in 1715. He volunteered to serve as a cadet in the cavalry of the city of Mérida, Aadi where he fought against the English at Laguna de Términos. For his valor, he was promoted to lieutenant and posted to Querétaro. There he fought in the wars against the Apaches. In Querétaro he learned to treat the Indians "como amigos, con mano suave, y como enemigos, con rigor implacable" (as friends, with a soft hand, and as enemies, with implacable rigor).

In 1727 he pacified the Pames, who had revolted in Celaya, and was promoted to sergeant mayor of the regiment. In 1732 he subdued rebels at the mines in Guanajuato, and the following year he did the same at Irapuato. In 1734 he pacified 10,000 Indian rebels at San Miguel el Grande. For these accomplishments, he was promoted to colonel and assigned as an aide to the captain general of the Sierra Gorda.

In 1742 he was transferred from Querétaro to Veracruz, which was threatened by the English, but upon his arrival he received orders to return to Tehuacán. In 1749 he pacified disturbances in Querétaro that resulted from a famine following a drought. Several times he visited the missions in the Sierra Gorda, introducing reforms in the administration. He also fought against the Tamaulipecos who were devastating the region of Nuevo León.

== Colonization of Nuevo Santander ==
In the late 1740s New Spain, because of encroachments of the French from Louisiana and the English along the Gulf coast, decided that they would have to complete the conquest of the Seno Mexicano (the Gulf coast, especially Tamaulipas and Texas). A council of war meeting was held to consider this project, from May 8, 1748, to May 13. Various officers presented plans, and that of José de Escandón was chosen as the most comprehensive.

Escandón had already financed an expedition to the region and thus was in a position to choose sites for settlement. He proposed the name Nuevo Santander. He also proposed a budget of 115,000 pesos for the new expedition, plus 500 pesos for each colonist. Upon the acceptance of Escandón's plan, it was advertised in Querétaro, San Luis Potosí, Charcas, Huasteca, Nuevo León and Coahuila, and very quickly attracted the intended number of colonists.

Between December 25, 1748, the date of the foundation of Llera, and 1755, he founded over twenty towns or villages and a number of missions in the colony, including Santander, Soto la Marina, Güemes, Camargo, Reynosa, Mier, and Revilla south of the Rio Grande, and Laredo and Nuestra Señora de los Dolores hacienda north of the Rio Grande. Escandón is sometimes referred to as the "father of the lower Rio Grande Valley".

== As governor of Nuevo Santander ==
For his firmness and energy, he was also known as the Exterminator of the Pames of Querétaro. In Nuevo Santander he was accused of murdering the Indians and taking slaves. He faced a court case where he was charged with illegally using Indian labor in his textile mills and using the port of Santander to bring in English contraband. However, in the period 1770-1775 there were more than twice as many deaths among the Indians as in the 22 years he governed.

Among his enemies in the region were the Jesuits, the French and the secular clergy.

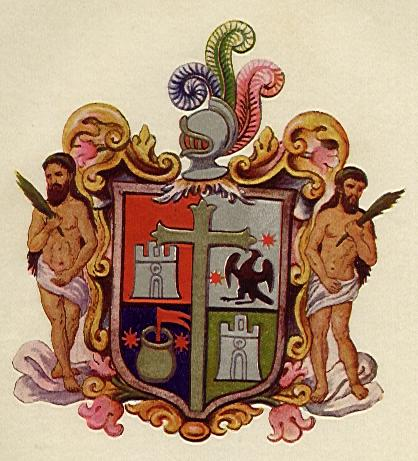
Coat of arms of José de Escandón

He accumulated vast wealth during his stay in Querétaro, San Miguel and Nuevo Santander from the work of badly paid Indians and slaves, as well as large land grants from the viceroys. The livestock and other products of his lands, as well as the goods he bought from the colonists, were shipped from the port of Soto la Marina along the coast to Veracruz in a frigate he owned.

He was considered one of the great statesmen of New Spain in the eighteenth century, superior to many of the viceroys. He assigned activities and crops to each settlement, stimulated irrigation and constructed roads and bridges. He built a grand mansion in Santander, capital of the colony, known as the Palace of the Count. He also built the church at Santander and a reservoir for drinking water. He brought in masons, carpenters and blacksmiths from Tacubaya and established kilns as well as sugar and flour mills.

To reward him for his services, the Crown granted him the title of conde de Sierra Gorda, free of lanzas (duty imposed on noblemen in lieu of military service) and media anata (tax paid on assuming office).

He died forgotten in 1770, probably on September 10, in Quetétero or Mexico City. Five years later he was exonerated of the legal charges against him, and rehabilitated. The title passed to his eldest son, Manuel. Manuel died without descendants, and the second son of José, Mariano, became count.

Ciudad Victoria, now the capital of the state of Tamaulipas, erected a statue to his memory in 1975. There are also streets named for him there and in Querétaro. In Laredo, Texas, the Festival de Música José de Escandón is celebrated annually in November. There is also a statue dedicated to him in Alice, Texas.

A statue was dedicated to Jose de Escandon in 2014. It is located at the University of Texas Rio Grande Valley in Edinburg, Texas.

== See also ==
- Blas María de la Garza Falcón
