= Canale =

Canale may refer to:

== Places ==
Italy

- Canale, Piedmont, a comune in the Province of Cuneo
- Canale, Trentino-Alto Adige/Südtirol, a frazione in the Province of Trento
- Canale d'Agordo, a comune in the Province of Belluno, Veneto
- Canale Monterano, a comune in the Province of Rome, Lazio

== People ==
- Canale (surname), an Italian surname
