= Lourdes Quiñones Canales =

Mexican politician

- Born: 11 February 1953 (age 73); Durango, Durango, Mexico
- Occupation: Deputy
- Political party: PRI
- Spouse: Jaime Antonio Villegas Pacheco
- Children: Sol Violeta Lluvia Ximena

Lourdes Eulalia Quiñones Canales (born 11 February 1953) is a Mexican politician affiliated with the PRI. As of 2013 she served as Deputy of both the LX and LXII Legislatures of the Mexican Congress representing Durango.
