= Álamo Pérez-Luna =

Peruvian television presenter and journalist (1963–2025)

Álamo Ernesto Pérez-Luna Canales (July 29, 1963 – April 17, 2025) was a Peruvian television presenter and journalist known for being the host of Fuego cruzado, Vidas extremas, and Diez.

Luna died on April 17, 2025, at the age of 61.

== Filmography ==
- Mea culpa (Canal A, 2001)
- Springboard to Fame for the Whole World (Panamericana, 2005)
- Crossfire (ATV, 2008-2009)
- Extreme Lives (ATV, 2009–2012)
- See you tomorrow (ATV+, 2013)
- Diez (ATV, 2011–2014)
- Giving it Turns (ATV+, 2013)
- A modo mío (Servicable, 2022)
