= Michelangelo Canale =

American dancer and teacher (born 1967)

Maestro Michelangelo Canale
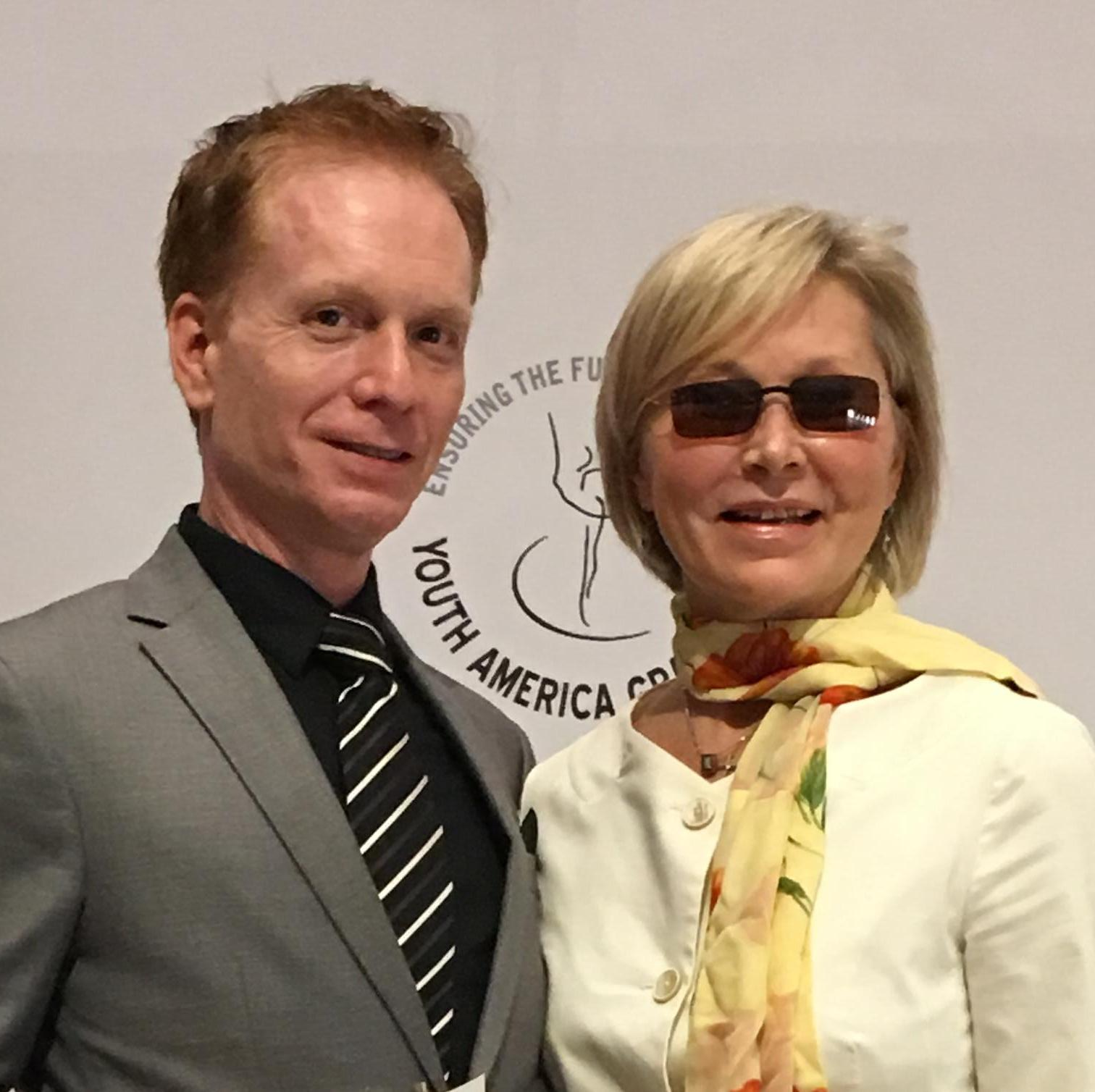
- Michelangelo Canale with Irina Lebedeva at YAGP Gala in New York City
- Born: November 17, 1967 (age 58); New Orleans, Louisiana
- Other names: Mike, Michael, Vincenti, Vincent, Micky
- Education: Juilliard School, UNLV

Michelangelo Canale (born November 17, 1967) is an American dancer, teacher, choreographer and artistic director of ballet.

== Early life ==
Canale was born in New Orleans, Louisiana. He began his formal dance training at the University of Nevada, Las Vegas, after graduating early from high school. He continued his training at Stephens College, The Juilliard School on full scholarship, and Canada's Royal Winnipeg Ballet School under David Moroni. After attending the Royal Winnipeg Ballet School, he continued his education at the Vaganova Method Conference and Demonstration conferences for teacher training held at the Vaganova Ballet Academy in St. Petersburg, Russia. Canale had the opportunity to train with David Moroni, Petru Macra, Alexander Kalinin, Michael Simms, Garold Gardner, Konstantine Shatilov, Oleg Vinogradov, and Julia Arkos.

In 1994 Canale auditioned, and was accepted as a student into the Vaganova Ballet Academy's summer program in St. Petersburg, Russia. This was the first program after the fall of the Iron Curtain under the direction of Igor Belsky.

== Career ==
Canale was a dancer with the New Orleans Delta Festival Ballet, and the Royal Winnipeg Ballet. He later founded the Anchorage Ballet and served as artistic director from 1997 to 2019. He and his wife Farah Canale opened the Anchorage Classical Ballet Academy after they moved to Alaska in 1996.

In July 2019, Canale opened the Alaska Ballet and the Alaska Ballet Academy. He also makes guest appearances at the Rock School in Las Vegas, Nevada, as well as other schools throughout the United States.

== Honors and awards ==
Canale is a two-time recipient of the Paddy Stone Choreographic Award for Outstanding Choreography.

He is supported by a grant from the Alaska State Council on the Arts and serves on the Honorary Advisory Board for the Garold Gardner Scholarship Foundation. His choreography, Reminiscence (a Juilliard classroom project) premiered to a sold-out house on the Royal Winnipeg Ballet in 1991 at the First Night Festival, Centennial Concert Hall, in Winnipeg Manitoba with dancers Gino DiMarco and Zofiia Tujaka. In 2009, his students qualified to compete in the finals at the Youth America Grand Prix Competition in New York City.

Canale holds a certificate from the Vaganova Choreographic Institute's teachers program under Igor Belskey.

== Repertoire, Credits, and Projects ==
In 2006, Canale directed the Spring Celebration and organized Alaska Governor Sean Parnell's Inauguration dance. In 2007, he staged a new choreographic work for the Anchorage Ballet. His modern dance repertoire includes Jose Limon's "A Choreographic Offering" staged by Jonthan Leinbach.

Canale's credits include Royal Winnipeg Ballet, André Eglevsky Ballet, Characters Dance Collective, Kalinin Dance Theatre, Fedicheva Ballet, The Juilliard Opera Center, Manitoba Opera Association and New Orleans Delta Festival Ballet.

Canale's Choreographic Credits include Royal Winnipeg Ballet, Winnipeg School of the Performing Arts, Characters Dance Collective, André Eglevsky Ballet, Las Vegas Dance Theatre, and the Anchorage Opera.

Canale is a certified Labanotator and holds a certificate from the Dance Notation Bureau in New York City.

== Accolades ==
Under the direction of Michelangelo Canale, the Anchorage Ballet won the Anchorage Mayor's Award for the Arts—the Outstanding Arts Organization for 2010.
