= Felipe González de Canales =

Felipe González de Canales is a Spanish author and educator who co-founded the Escuelas Familiares Agrarias (Agrarian Family Schools) in Spain for agriculture education.

Today there are 30 schools in Spain with 40,000 alumni, and 3,000 students. These schools have influenced the establishment of 14 agricultural schools in Peru, nine in Argentina, and six in the Philippines.

Gonzalez is also the President of the Federacion de Instituto del Desarollo Comunitario (Federation of the Institute of Community Development). He is also the Secretary-General of the Red Estatal de Desarollo Rural (Statewide Network for Rural Development) or Reder. He is also the founder of the farmers trade union Jóvenes Agricultores (Young Farmers) and of the Unión Sindical Obrera (Workers Trade Union), with José Luis Fernández Santillana.

Gonzalez co-wrote the book, Roturar y sembrar, published by Rialp on the fortieth anniversary of the agrarian schools.

== Publications and conferences ==
- Roturar y sembrar, a history of the EFAs, written by Felipe Gonzalez de Canales
- El futuro del mundo rural en una sociedad comprometida y con proyecto - sponsored by the Universidad Internacional Menendez Pelayo.
- El Punto de Vista de los Grupos de Desarrollo Rural
