= Michele Giuseppe Canale =

Italian historian

Michele Giuseppe Canale (1808-1890) was an Italian historian.

== Biography ==
He was born in Genoa, and through Cavour's influence secured the professorship of history and geography at Genoa's Polytechnic Institute. In 1858 he founded the Società Ligure di Storia Patria, a society to promote the study of national history.

== Work ==
His most important publication was the Storia della repubblica di Genova (Vols. I.-V., 1858–74).
