= María Torre Canales =

Mexican politician

- Born: 13 October 1974 (age 51); State of Mexico, Mexico
- Occupation: Politician
- Political party: PANAL

María del Pilar Torre Canales (born 13 October 1974) is a Mexican politician from the New Alliance Party. From 2009 to 2012 she served as Deputy of the LXI Legislature of the Mexican Congress representing the State of Mexico.
