= Canales =

- municipality
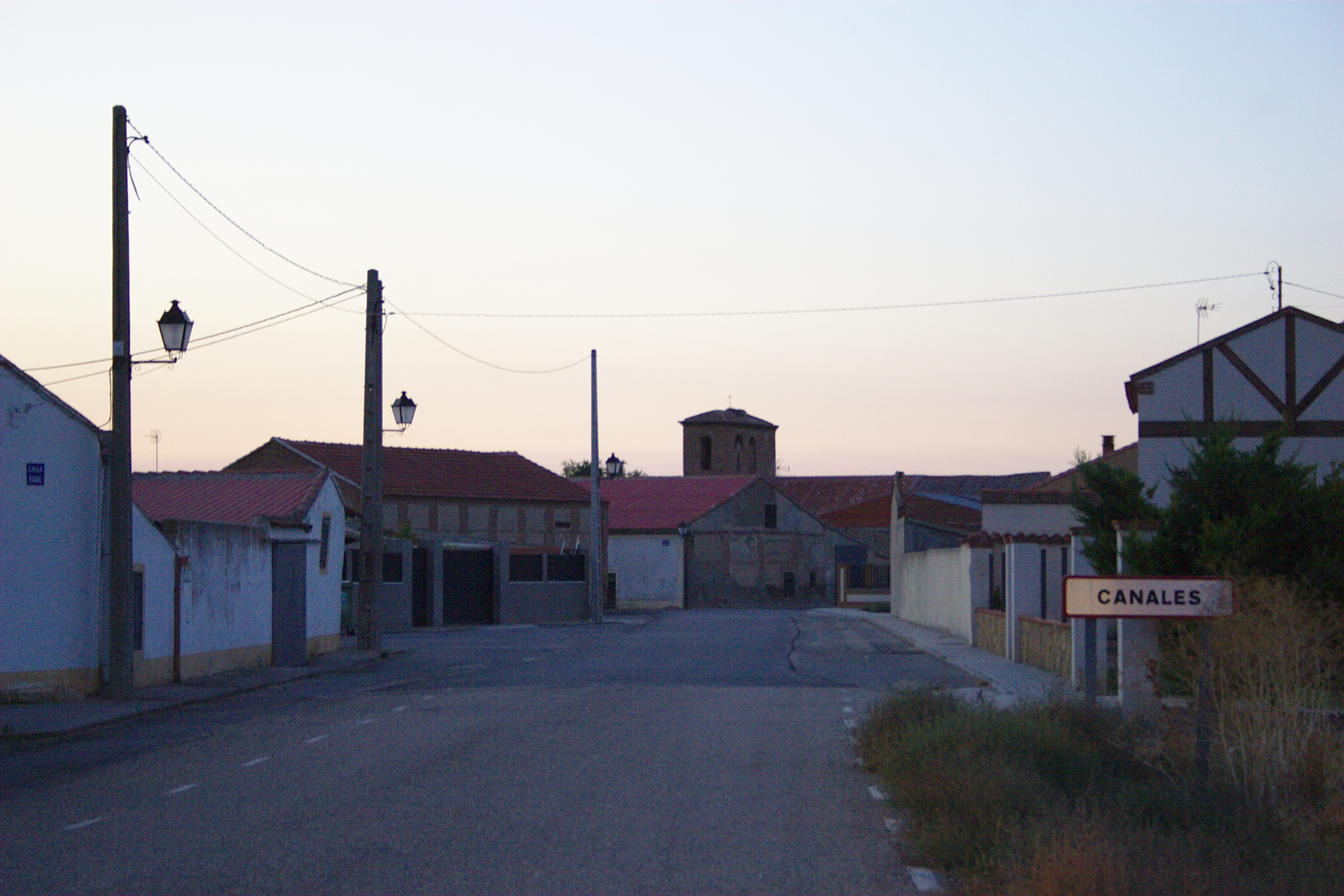
- Street of Canales
- Flag Coat of arms
- Location in Spain. Canales (Spain)
- Coordinates: 41°00′10″N 4°53′59″W
- Country: Spain
- Autonomous community: Castile and León
- Province: Ávila
- Municipality: Canales

Area
  - Total: 6.67 km^{2} (2.58 sq mi)
- Elevation: 857 m (2,812 ft)

Population (2025-01-01)
  - Total: 42
  - Density: 6.3/km^{2} (16/sq mi)
- Time zone: UTC+1 (CET)
  - Summer (DST): UTC+2 (CEST)
- Website: Official website

Canales is a municipality located in the province of Ávila, Castile and León, Spain. According to the 2006 census (INE), the municipality had a population of 57 inhabitants.

== Population ==
Historical population
| Year | Pop. | ±% p.a. |
|---|---|---|
| 2023 | 36 | — |
| 2024 | 35 | −2.78% |
| 2025 | 42 | +20.00% |
Source: INE
