= Llera de Canales, Tamaulipas =

Coordinates: 23°19′N 99°01′W

Llera de Canales
- Municipality
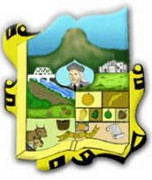
- Coat of arms

- Location in Mexico Llera de Canales (Mexico)
- Country: Mexico
- State: Tamaulipas
- Demonym: (in Spanish)
- Time zone: UTC−6 (CST)

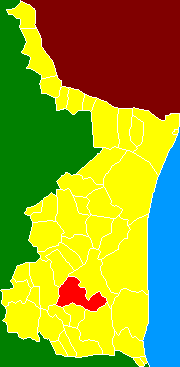
The location of Llera de Canales.

Llera de Canales is a municipality located in the Mexican state of Tamaulipas. Also called Llera, the municipality has an area of 2,307 square kilometres (891 sq mi) and a 2010 population of 17,333. The population of the town of Llera is 4,148. Llera was founded December 25, 1748 and later renamed Llera de Canales.

== History and economy ==
Llera was the first Spanish settlement founded in Tamaulipas (then Nuevo Santander), although a few Spaniards already resided in the region. They were clustered around presidios created to protect the frontier from Indian raids. The founder of Llera was Colonel Jose de Escandon, Count of Sierra Gorda. He led a large colonizing mission to Nuevo Santander in 1748 and established the Villa de Santa Maria de Llera. The initial colonists consisted of eleven soldiers and 44 families commanded by Captain Jose de Escajadilla.

The economy of the municipality is mostly agricultural with the most important agricultural products being citrus, onions, cattle, and sorghum. About one half the cultivated area is irrigated.

== Geography ==
Llera is situated on the banks of the Guayaleyo River, part of the Panuco River system. The Guayalejo is clear and fast-running and is popular for recreation, including kayaking. The municipality extends from the plains to the higher elevations of the Sierra Madre Oriental west of the town of Llera. Tamaulipan mezquital, a low growing, thorny shrubland, is the most common vegetation. Most of the municipality has a semi-arid climate with hot summers and warm winters.(BS climate in the Köppen system), although higher elevations are cooler and moister. Freezes are rare at lower elevations, but common in winter at elevations of more than 1,000 metres (3,300 ft). 17,343 hectares (42,860 acres) (173 km^{2}) of the municipality is included in the El Cielo Biosphere, a mountainous area noted for being the northernmost extension in Mexico of the tropical Veracruz moist forests and sub-tropical cloud forests.

Climate data for Llera de Canales, Tamaulipas. 23 19 N, 99 01W. Elevation: 270 metres (890 ft)
Month	Jan	Feb	Mar	Apr	May	Jun	Jul	Aug	Sep	Oct	Nov	Dec	Year
Mean daily maximum °C (°F)	25.7 (78.3)	27.9 (82.2)	31.1 (88.0)	34.2 (93.6)	35.0 (95.0)	35.0 (95.0)	33.9 (93.0)	35.0 (95.0)	33.0 (91.4)	30.6 (87.1)	27.9 (82.2)	26.3 (79.3)	31.3 (88.3)
Daily mean °C (°F)	19.3 (66.7)	21.2 (70.2)	24.2 (75.6)	26.9 (80.4)	28.3 (82.9)	28.7 (83.7)	28.0 (82.4)	28.5 (83.3)	27.2 (81.0)	24.9 (76.8)	22.2 (72.0)	20.2 (68.4)	25.0 (77.0)
Mean daily minimum °C (°F)	12.8 (55.0)	14.4 (57.9)	17.2 (63.0)	19.7 (67.5)	21.5 (70.7)	22.5 (72.5)	22.1 (71.8)	22.0 (71.6)	21.4 (70.5)	19.2 (66.6)	16.4 (61.5)	14.1 (57.4)	18.6 (65.5)
Average precipitation mm (inches)	8 (0.3)	15 (0.6)	16 (0.6)	26 (1.0)	65 (2.6)	124 (4.9)	95 (3.7)	79 (3.1)	114 (4.5)	66 (2.6)	22 (0.9)	7 (0.3)	636 (25.0)
Source: Weatherbase: Lleras de Canales, Tamaulipas.
