= Jorge López Pérez =

Mexican drug lord

- Other names: El Chuta
- Employers: Mexican Army (1979–1981); Los Zetas (suspected)
- Criminal charge: Drug trafficking
- Criminal status: Fugitive

Jorge López Pérez, also known as El Chuta, is a Mexican suspected drug lord and high-ranking member of Los Zetas, a criminal group based in Tamaulipas, Mexico. López Pérez joined the Mexican Army in 1979. He specialised in martial arts, parachuting, explosives and guerrilla warfare tactics. In 1981, he deserted from the military and joined a cell of the Juárez Cartel, where he coordinated drug trafficking operations in Cancún. In the early 2000s, López Pérez left and worked as an independent trafficker before joining the Gulf Cartel. He became one of the first members of the cartel's newly formed paramilitary wing, Los Zetas. Like López Pérez, most of the first members of Los Zetas were ex-military. Wanted on drug trafficking charges, he is one of the last remaining fugitives from the early Zetas generation.

== Early life and career ==
López Pérez joined the Mexican Army on 1 October 1979. He was enrolled as a paratrooper in the Parachute Rifle Brigade (Spanish: Brigada de Fusileros Paracaidistas) and was stationed at the Santa Lucía military base in the State of Mexico. During his tenure in the military, he became a specialist in martial arts, parachuting, explosives and guerrilla warfare tactics. He deserted from the military on 17 September 1981. López Pérez then joined the Juárez Cartel and was assigned to head drug trafficking operations in Cancún. He was part of a Quintana Roo-based cell headed by kingpin Alcides Ramón Magaña ("El Metro"). The local gang was known as the Cancún Cartel and/or the Southeast Cartel. When Ramón Magaña was arrested in June 2001, his colleague Jesús Albino Quintero Meraz ("El Beto") contacted López Pérez with a new job offer. Quintero Meraz suggested that he join the Gulf Cartel under kingpin Osiel Cárdenas Guillén. However, López Pérez moved to Veracruz and became successful as an independent drug trafficker instead. After Quintero Meraz was arrested in 2002, López Pérez moved to Yucatán to manage Colombian narcotics with several local smugglers. He fled to Tamaulipas in 2003 after the Mexican Army's efforts to apprehend him intensified.

Once in Tamaulipas, he was hired by Rogelio González Pizaña ("Z-2") and formally joined Los Zetas, the Gulf Cartel's newly formed paramilitary group that was originally composed of ex-commandos. López Pérez knew a number of members of Los Zetas from his days in the military. His alias "El Chuta" derived from the word "parachuting". López Pérez is often cited as one of the founding members of Los Zetas. When the group was formed in the late 1990s, it was originally responsible for proving security services to Cárdenas Guillén and carrying out executions on the cartel's behalf. However, it underwent organizational changes over the years and began to involve itself in other criminal activities, like drug trafficking alongside the Gulf Cartel. Due to his previous experience in the Juárez Cartel and his knowledge of drug operations in the area, López Pérez was assigned to coordinate drug trafficking activities for Los Zetas in Cancún. He was responsible for coordinating smuggling activities at the Cancún International Airport. According to security forces, López Pérez and other members of Los Zetas based in the Mexican states of Quintana Roo, Yucatán, Chiapas, and Campeche receive protection from corrupt municipal authorities and former members of the Juárez Cartel.

In Los Zetas, he reported directly to Heriberto Lazcano Lazcano ("Z-3"), who co-headed the criminal group with Miguel Treviño Morales ("Z-40"). In 2002, López Pérez and his colleague Jesús Enrique Rejón Aguilar ("El Mamito") were responsible for training new Zetas' hires. In 2004, he was responsible for coordinating international drug trafficking shipments in the Riviera Maya, an area that extended from Cancún to Tulum. This region was a strategic reception area for Los Zetas because it allowed them to receive South American narcotics arriving by boat. The drugs were stored in Playa del Carmen and Cancún for further distribution. In 2009, he was cited as a regional leader of Los Zetas in the state of Coahuila, a region he reportedly shared with Galindo Mellado Cruz ("Z-9"). That year Mexican federal authorities listed him, along with Lazcano, Rejón Aguilar, Gustavo González Castro ("El Erótico") and Flavio Méndez Santiago, as one of the leading fugitives in Los Zetas.

In early 2012, López Pérez headed operations for Los Zetas in northeastern Mexico and was paid directly by Lazcano. Among his colleagues in this region were González Castro, José Alberto González Xalate ("El Paisa") and Salvador Alfonso Martínez Escobedo ("La Ardilla"). (Note: The cited source misspells his second last name as Escobar.) Intelligence reports state that López Pérez was especially loyal to Lazcano, just like Zetas lieutenants González Castro, González Xalate, Juan Carlos Morales González ("El Peluchin"), Iván Velázquez Caballero ("El Talibán"), Prisciliano Ibarra Yepis and Raúl Lucio Hernández Lechuga ("El Lucky"). Several of them were once part of the Grupo Aeromóvil de Fuerzas Especiales (GAFE), the army's special forces.

== Charges and status ==
On 18 June 2003, Mexico's Attorney General's Office (PGR) placed an unspecified bounty on 31 members of Los Zetas, including López Pérez. Authorities stated that López Pérez was "highly dangerous", given his military background and his suspected role in homicides, drug trafficking, kidnappings, and carjackings. This announcement was made after the Specialized Unit Against Organized Crime (UEDO) identified him as a high-ranking member of Los Zetas following the 14 March arrest of Cárdenas Guillén. Unlike other Zetas members who voluntarily requested their release from the military, López Pérez had deserted and joined organized crime, which is considered high treason in a military court; López Pérez was wanted by the PGR, the Secretariat of National Defense (SEDENA) and the Secretariat of Public Security (SSP) for his outstanding charges.

Few details of his criminal activities are known; unlike the rest of the early members of Los Zetas, who were arrested and/or killed over the years, López Pérez reportedly disappeared from public view. Mexican authorities believe that he is trying to live a low-profile existence to avoid detection since there is an outstanding arrest warrant for him. He is one of the last remaining fugitives from the early Zetas generation. (Note: Other early members of the criminal group who remain at large are: Prisciliano Ibarra Yepis, Gustavo González Castro, Rogelio Guerra Ramírez ("El Guerra"), Carlos Vera Calva ("El Vera"), Daniel Enrique Márquez Aguilar ("El Chocotorro"), Benjamín Torres Sosa, Eduardo Estrada Gonzalez and Leopoldo Flores Soto.)

== See also ==
- List of fugitives from justice who disappeared
- Mexican drug war

== Bibliography ==
- Grayson, George W. (2012). The Executioner's Men: Los Zetas, Rogue Soldiers, Criminal Entrepreneurs, and the Shadow State They Created (1st ed.). Transaction Publishers. ISBN 9781412846172.
- Ravelo, Ricardo (2006). Los narcoabogados (in Spanish). Grijalbo. ISBN 9685964793.
- Callejo Anzures, José Antonio (2002). De Cancún a Almoloya: el imperio roto de Mario Villanueva (in Spanish). Océano. ISBN 9706516891.
- Borges, Tomás (2008). Maquiavelo para narcos: el fin justifica los miedos (in Spanish). Perseus Distribution Services. ISBN 978-9703708000.
