= Galindo Mellado Cruz =

Mexican ex-commando and drug lord (1973–2014)

Galdino Mellado Cruz
- Born: 18 April 1973; Tampico Alto, Veracruz, Mexico
- Died: 9 May 2014 (aged 41); Reynosa, Tamaulipas, Mexico
- Cause of death: Multiple gunshot wounds
- Other names: Z-9; El Mellado; Galdino Mellado Cruz; Comandante Mellado; Metro-10
- Employers: Mexican Army (1992 - 1999); Federal Judicial Police
- Organization(s): Los Zetas (1999-2010); Gulf Cartel (1999-2014); Los Metros (2010-2014)

Galdino or Galindo Mellado Cruz (18 April 1973 – 9 May 2014), commonly referred to by his alias El Mellado and/or Z-9, was a Mexican suspected drug lord and one of the founders of Los Zetas, a criminal organization originally formed by ex-commandos from the Mexican Armed Forces. He joined the Mexican Army in 1992 and was part of the Grupo Aeromóvil de Fuerzas Especiales (GAFE), an elite special forces unit of the Army. In 1999, he withdrew from the military and was recruited by the Gulf Cartel, a drug trafficking organization, shortly thereafter.

With other ex-commandos, he formed Los Zetas, a group that worked as the Gulf Cartel's military wing. In 2010, the Gulf Cartel and Los Zetas broke relations and Mellado Cruz sided with the former to maintain a low profile status. He was killed in a gunfight against Mexican security forces in Reynosa, Tamaulipas, on 9 May 2014.

== Early life and career ==
Galindo Mellado Cruz (also Galdino) was born in Tampico Alto, Veracruz, Mexico on 18 April 1973. (Note: His exact name is unclear. The Mexican government has used Galindo Mellado Cruz and Galdino Mellado Cruz interchangeably.) According to the Secretariat of National Defense (SEDENA), Mellado Cruz joined the Mexican Armed Forces as a soldier in the Mexican Army on 1 September 1992. During his tenure in the military, he was part of the Grupo Aeromóvil de Fuerzas Especiales (GAFE), an elite special forces unit of the Army, where he received top military training. On 1 May 1999, however, he applied to be discharged from the Army. Shortly thereafter, he was recruited by the Gulf Cartel, a Mexican drug trafficking organization, and began working for the drug kingpin Osiel Cárdenas Guillén along with several other ex-commandos from the Army.

The group of former soldiers recruited by the Gulf Cartel became known as Los Zetas, and Mellado Cruz was part of the original fourteen founders of the group. The group's members were Arturo Guzmán Decena (alias "Z-1"), the leader; Alejandro Lucio Morales Betancourt (alias "Z-2"); Heriberto Lazcano Lazcano (alias "El Lazca" and "Z-3"), Mateo Díaz López (alias "Z-6"); Jesús Enrique Rejón Aguilar (alias "El Mamito"); Óscar Guerrero Silva (alias "Z-8"); Omar Lorméndez Pitalúa (alias "Z-10"); Efraín Teodoro Torres (alias "Z-14"); Mellado Cruz (also known by his alias "Z-9" and "El Mellado"), among other ex-commandos. Throughout the late 1990s and early 2000s, Los Zetas were the Gulf Cartel's military wing and had the task of protecting Cárdenas Guillén and killing rival cartel members.

When Cárdenas Guillén was arrested by Mexican security forces in Matamoros, Tamaulipas, on 14 March 2003, the leadership of the Gulf Cartel was handed over to his brother Antonio Cárdenas Guillén (alias "Tony Tormenta") and Jorge Eduardo Costilla Sánchez (alias "El Coss"). The leadership of Los Zetas, on the other hand, was kept under the control of Lazcano Lazcano. However, Cárdenas Guillén allegedly continued to command the Gulf Cartel and Los Zetas behind bars; with his extradition to the United States in 2007, Los Zetas and the Gulf Cartel kept their alliance under a loose relationship, but each of their respective leaders attempted to fill the leadership void. Following several disagreements and internal power struggles, both criminal organizations broke their alliance and declared war on each other in early 2010.

According to information from U.S. law enforcement, Mellado Cruz sided with the Gulf Cartel after the split in order to maintain a low-profile status and avoid public attention. Under the Gulf Cartel, he allegedly oversaw organized crime activities at the U.S.-Mexico border area known as La Ribereña, which encompasses the municipalities of Camargo and Miguel Alemán in Tamaulipas. Sometime between 2010 and 2014, Mellado Cruz escaped from two prisons in Tamaulipas after being imprisoned for rape, armed robbery, homicide, and drug trafficking. He also had thirteen pending criminal investigations for homicide, kidnapping, extortion, and drug trafficking accusations.

== Kingpin Act sanction ==
On 24 March 2010, the United States Department of the Treasury sanctioned Mellado Cruz under the Foreign Narcotics Kingpin Designation Act (sometimes referred to simply as the "Kingpin Act"), for his involvement in drug trafficking along with fifty-three other international criminals and ten foreign entities. The act prohibited U.S. citizens and companies from doing any kind of business activity with him, and virtually froze all his assets in the U.S.

== Death ==
On 9 May 2014, Mellado Cruz was killed in a shootout against Mexican federal security forces at a domicile in Las Fuentes neighborhood in Reynosa, Tamaulipas. During the firefight, grenades detonated and shots were exchanged between law enforcement and Mellado Cruz's aides. Gulf Cartel gunmen set roadblocks and threw road spikes throughout Reynosa's streets to prevent the mobilization of reinforcements from the military. Reinforcements from organized crime arrived at the scene in an attempt to save his life, but he was shot dead inside the property. Following his death, the gunmen left the premises. The firefight left five more gunmen associated with him dead, along with a Mexican Army soldier.

Inside the house, authorities discovered several assault rifles, including a Barrett 50 rifle and AK-47s, along with grenades, cartridges, and other weapons the criminals used to combat law enforcement. Mellado Cruz's death came amid an internal power struggle within the Gulf Cartel, as rival factions within the organization fought each other and Los Zetas, their former allies, for the control of Reynosa and the rest of Tamaulipas. Days prior to his death, gunfights in Reynosa had left a total of at least 23 dead, including two innocent bystanders, a couple of federal policemen, a soldier, and eighteen suspected criminals.

In order to confirm the drug lord's identity, the Mexican government carried out forensic anthropology studies, where they analyzed the corpse's pictures with the photos from Mellado Cruz's time in the military. They also compared the corpse's fingerprints and DNA samples with the ones they had on file in the Mexican Armed Forces database. The following day, authorities apprehended Ricardo Flores López (also known as Pedro Luis Hernández Campos), the alleged second-in-command behind Mellado Cruz and the cartel's chief in Miguel Alemán, Tamaulipas.

== See also ==
- Mexican drug war
