= Efraín Teodoro Torres =

Mexican mob boss

- Died: 3 March 2007; Veracruz, Veracruz, Mexico
- Resting place: Poza Rica, Veracruz, Mexico (Before body was snatched)
- Other names: Z-14; El Efra; El Chispa
- Organization(s): Mexican Army (1991–1998); Gulf Cartel\Los Zetas (1998–2007)

Efraín Teodoro Torres (died 3 March 2007) was a Mexican suspected drug lord and one of the founders of Los Zetas, a criminal organization formed by former soldiers of the Mexican Armed Forces. He joined the Mexican Army in mid-1991 but deserted after seven years of service. In 1998, Torres was recruited by the drug lord Osiel Cárdenas Guillén to join the ranks of the Gulf Cartel, a drug trafficking organization. The new group formed by ex-commandos came to be known as Los Zetas.

Torres was killed in the city of Veracruz, following a dispute surrounding a horse race competition on 3 March 2007. After his body was buried, his own gunmen broke into the cemetery that same night and stole his body. Following his death, Miguel Treviño Morales became the leader of Los Zetas statewide.

== Criminal career ==
Torres joined the infantry division of the Mexican Army on 1 August 1991. Three years later, he was promoted to the corporal unit. In 1996, he was reportedly trained at the School of the Americas in Counter-Narcotics training. Nonetheless, he deserted from the Mexican Army on 13 September 1998 and joined the ranks of the Gulf Cartel, a Mexican drug trafficking organization. The Gulf Cartel, under the tutelage of the then-leader Osiel Cárdenas Guillén, first recruited a Mexican special forces soldier, Arturo Guzmán Decena, in the late 1990s. With his help, Cárdenas Guillén managed to recruit several other soldiers from the military to work full-time for the Gulf Cartel, forming a paramilitary group known as Los Zetas. Torres was given the radio code and alias Z-14 for being one of the fourteen original military deserters who founded Los Zetas.

Torres formally initiated his criminal career by commanding an armed assault at a prison in Apatzingán on 5 January 2004, where more than 25 inmates were liberated. When the former soldiers and drug traffickers Omar Lorméndez Pitalúa ("Z-10") and Mateo Díaz López ("Comandante Mateo") were arrested by the Mexican authorities in 2006, Torres took the lead of Los Zetas in the Mexican state of Michoacán alongside Gustavo González Castro ("El Erótico"). As a leader of Los Zetas, Torres was responsible for overseeing drug shipments in the state of Veracruz and across the Gulf of Mexico. In the northern state of Tamaulipas, Torres commanded the distribution sites in the cities of Ciudad Camargo and Miguel Alemán with Jesús Enrique Rejón Aguilar and another Zeta member. Torres was considered one of Mexico's most-wanted criminals by the Attorney General of Mexico (PGR) prior to his death.

=== Death ===
Several members of Los Zetas and the Gulf Cartel were holding a horse race event at a ranch called El Villarín in the municipality of Veracruz on 3 March 2007. Two horses were competing while people drank, yelled, and made bets worth $2 million U.S. dollars. Both horses ran from the starting line at a fast pace and got to the finish line side by side. But before anyone could verify the winner through the photograph finish, a shooting broke out between the drug traffickers. According to police intelligence, the dispute broke out as an excuse to kill Heriberto Lazcano Lazcano, another leader of Los Zetas and close associate of Torres.

As the shooting began to escalate, all of the personalities of Mexico's criminal underworld that were present at the horse race left in their vehicles, hid behind the stadium stands, or wherever they could. Teodoro Torres and another man died of gunshot wounds, and two others were injured. Torres had been taken alive to the Millenium Hospital in Veracruz city by five of his accomplices, but he was later pronounced dead.

Early in the morning on 5 March 2007, his body was buried at Jardín de los Ángeles cemetery in Poza Rica, Veracruz. That same night, Gulf Cartel gunmen arrived at the cemetery in two vehicles and overwhelmed the night-guard. They later left the place after exhuming and taking Torres' corpse.

Following the death of Torres, Miguel Treviño Morales ("Z-40") became the new leader of Los Zetas in the state of Veracruz.

==== Alleged betrayal ====
After the supreme leader of the Gulf Cartel and Los Zetas, Osiel Cárdenas Guillén, was extradited to the United States in 2007, tensions within the criminal organization rose, as Heriberto Lazcano Lazcano (the Zeta leader) and Jorge Eduardo Costilla Sánchez (the Gulf Cartel successor) fought for supremacy. The infighting worsened when Torres was killed; there are certain cells within Los Zetas that believe that Miguel Treviño Morales ("Z-40") betrayed Torres and ordered his assassination. They also believe that Treviño Morales is responsible for betraying other Zeta leaders, including Jaime González Durán ("El Hummer"), Jesús Enrique Rejón Aguilar ("El Mamito"), Raúl Lucio Hernández Lechuga ("El Lucky"), and Arturo Guzmán Decena ("Z-1"), by setting up their arrests or deaths.

According to police reports, during the horse race competition, Torres was accompanied by 18 armed gunmen. When the dispute occurred, two men attempted to kill Torres, but the shot that killed Torres reportedly came from one of his bodyguards, who shot him in the back. Two bodyguards were arrested and taken to prison after being severely beaten by alleged Zetas, who wanted to know who was the mastermind behind Torres' assassination.

== Personal life ==
Torres, who had received military training before joining Los Zetas, "epitomize[d] the cowboy mentality" of a reckless drug trafficker. He reportedly drank large amounts of alcohol, developed a cocaine habit, and liked betting on horse races. He used the alias Roberto Carlos Carmona Gasperín.

== See also ==
- Mexican drug war

== Sources ==
=== Bibliography ===
- Grayson, George W. (2010). Mexico: Narco-Violence and a Failed State?. Transaction Publishers. p. 291. ISBN 978-1412811514.
- Grayson, George W. (2012). The Executioner's Men: Los Zetas, Rogue Soldiers, Criminal Entrepreneurs, and the Shadow State They Created. Transaction Publishers. ISBN 9781412846172.
