= Omar Lorméndez Pitalúa =

Mexican drug lord

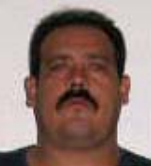
- Born: Omar Lorméndez Pitalúa; 18 January 1972 (age 53); Tultitlán, State of Mexico, Mexico
- Other names: El Pita; Z-10; Z8-HK37
- Employers: Mexican Army (1991–1999); Los Zetas (suspected)
- Criminal status: Fugitive
- Spouse: Angélica Lagunas Jaramillo (m. 2002)
- Children: Ana Bertha González Lagunas (stepdaughter)

Notes
- Arrested in 2005; released in 2013

Omar Lorméndez Pitalúa (born 18 January 1972) is a Mexican suspected drug lord and high-ranking member of Los Zetas, a criminal group based in Tamaulipas, Mexico. He joined the Mexican Army in 1991 and deserted in 1999. He then joined the Gulf Cartel under kingpin Osiel Cárdenas Guillén, becoming one of the first members of its newly formed paramilitary wing, Los Zetas. Like Lorméndez Pitalúa, most of the original members of Los Zetas were ex-military. Los Zetas was responsible for providing security services to Cárdenas Guillén and carrying out executions on the cartel's behalf. In 2001, Lorméndez Pitalúa worked on assignments for Los Zetas and was responsible for ensuring that smugglers paid taxes to the Gulf Cartel and operated under their supervision in Matamoros.

Lorméndez Pitalúa was then transferred to Nuevo Laredo, where he commanded Zetas' forces against affiliates of the rival Sinaloa Cartel. In 2003, he was sent to Michoacán and formed an alliance with La Familia Michoacana to gain control of the territory controlled by the Milenio Cartel. He had the support of local authorities who helped to facilitate the Zetas' operations in exchange for bribery payments. In 2005, Lorméndez Pitalúa was arrested in Michoacán and imprisoned in a maximum-security facility. Released in 2013, he resumed his organized crime activities and joined the faction Zetas Vieja Escuela.

== Early life and background ==
Omar Lorméndez Pitalúa was born on 18 January 1972 in Tultitlán, State of Mexico, Mexico. He has an alternative place of birth in Tlalnepantla de Baz, where his birth certificate was registered. Lorméndez Pitalúa joined the Mexican Army on 21 July 1991. According to a protected witness, he served as a member of the elite Grupo Aeromóvil de Fuerzas Especiales (GAFE), the special forces unit of the Army. He deserted from the military on 26 November 1999, and then joined the Gulf Cartel, a criminal group based in Tamaulipas.

Lorméndez Pitalúa became a member of the cartel's newly created paramilitary group, known as Los Zetas, which was largely composed of ex-commandos. His immediate bosses were Osiel Cárdenas Guillén and Zetas leader Arturo Guzmán Decena ("Z-1"). Lorméndez Pitalúa is one of the founding members of Los Zetas. He was reportedly part of the Grupo de los 14 (English: Group of 14), who were the first fourteen Zetas members. In Los Zetas, Lorméndez Pitalúa used the code names "Z-10" and/or "Z8-HK37". He has several other known aliases, including: "El Pita", "El Patas", "Comandante Pita", "El Chavita", "El Mono Tonto" and "El Mono Zonzo". His surnames are also sometimes written with slightly different variations: Larméndez, Lormendes, or Patalúa.

When Lorméndez Pitalúa joined Los Zetas, the group's purpose was to provide security services to Cárdenas Guillén and to carry out executions on the cartel's behalf. Over the years, Los Zetas underwent organizational changes and became increasingly involved in other criminal activities alongside the Gulf Cartel, including drug trafficking. Lorméndez Pitalúa and other members of Los Zetas were placed in-charge of collecting fees for the Gulf Cartel from people who worked in contraband merchandise, human smuggling, and drug trafficking in Matamoros. (Note: In the Mexican criminal underworld, this fee or tax is known as piso.) They also guarded prostitution zones and beaches to prevent smugglers from moving illegal merchandise through Matamoros without paying taxes.

== Kidnapping of Angélica Lagunas Jaramillo ==
Lorméndez Pitalúa kidnapped Angélica Lagunas Jaramillo on 16 August 2001 on orders from the Gulf Cartel. He and other Zetas' members abducted Lagunas Jaramillo and her daughter Ana Bertha González Lagunas for running a contraband business in Matamoros without the cartel's authorization. Lagunas Jaramillo was dealing in alcohol, perfumes, cocaine and marijuana without paying fees to the cartel. She had a restaurant from which she operated.

According to the testimony of Lagunas Jaramillo and Agustín Hernández Martínez, a former Gulf Cartel operator and protected witness under the code name "Rafael", the cartel summoned Lorméndez Pitalúa and over a dozen Zetas gunmen to abduct Lagunas Jaramillo and her daughter in Matamoros. The night the incident occurred, Lorméndez Pitalúa and others went to her property and rang the doorbell. When Lagunas Jaramillo opened the door, they stormed in and grabbed her. (Note: It is unclear where the abduction took place; some sources say it was in her house, others say at her restaurant.) Lagunas Jaramillo was dragged by her hair around the house while Lorméndez Pitalúa searched for contraband merchandise. They were unable to find cocaine and marijuana and proceeded to take her money and jewelry. Lorméndez Pitalúa and others then forced Lagunas Jaramillo into a vehicle.

Lorméndez Pitalúa took Lagunas Jaramillo to a secret location known as "Punto Óscar" to meet Cárdenas Guillén. At the meeting, she was forced to hand over the drugs in her possession, give the cartel the money she had in her bank accounts to pay the outstanding fees, and work for them. If she refused, the cartel promised to kill her. Cárdenas Guillén also threatened Lagunas Jaramillo with death if she did not purchase houses for the cartel under her name to be used as safe houses. Both Lagunas Jaramillo and her daughter agreed to the Gulf Cartel's demands.

Approximately three months after her abduction, her restaurant became a popular eatery for Lorméndez Pitalúa and other Zetas members, and she became involved in drug trafficking activities with drugs provided by Los Zetas. She and her daughter helped them smuggle narcotics to the U.S. and the proceeds from drug sales back into Mexico. Lorméndez Pitalúa asked Cárdenas Guillén for 15 days off to organize a wedding, and he and Lagunas Jaramillo were married in 2002. Guzmán Decena and Lagunas Jaramillo's daughter had a child out of wedlock. (Note: Angélica Lagunas Jaramillo was eventually sentenced to 20 years for her role in the Gulf Cartel. Her daughter Ana Bertha González Lagunas was murdered in Matamoros in 2007.)

== Career ==
While in Los Zetas, Lorméndez Pitalúa had worked on several assignments directed by Guzmán Decena. On 20 June 2001, he was part of an assault team of twenty-five Zetas' members that raided the Tamaulipas State Police headquarters in Matamoros to free José Ramón Dávila López ("El Cholo"), a high-ranking Zetas' member from jail. According to eye-witnesses, Lorméndez Pitalúa and his associates stormed the police installation wearing black uniforms and sporting AK-47s and AR-15s, and used a tear-gas grenade launcher to rescue their comrade. Although Los Zetas were successful in rescuing Dávila López, they suffered a few losses: Zetas' member Hugo Ponce Salazar ("Z-4") was arrested alongside former Matamoros Municipal Police officer José Octavio Garza Garza and José Guadalupe Vidaña Triana. In retaliation for the losses inflicted by security forces and the increased police activity in their territory, Los Zetas reportedly responded less than three weeks later by murdering state police chief Jaime Yañez Cantú and his driver Gerardo Gascón Soltero in a drive-by shooting on 9 July 2001 in Matamoros. Dávila López began working under Lorméndez Pitalúa and Heriberto Lazcano Lazcano as one of the cartel's lead assassins.

On 14 March 2003, Cárdenas Guillén was arrested by the Mexican Army in Matamoros. His arrest dealt a huge blow to the Gulf Cartel and forced several cartel members to go into hiding temporarily. From March to August, Gulf Cartel leaders Jorge Eduardo Costilla Sánchez ("El Coss") and Gregorio Sauceda Gamboa ("El Caramuela") hid and continued to operate and maintained a low profile, but Lazcano Lazcano took over some of the cartel's operational activities and helped them regroup. During that period, Lorméndez Pitalúa was based out of Nuevo Laredo and reportedly operated on both sides of the U.S.-Mexico border. The U.S. Federal Bureau of Investigation (FBI) had information that Lorméndez Pitalúa and other Zetas members lived in Laredo, Texas. He was in charge of taking control of the territory from other gangs that operated in the area: Los Cachos, Los Texas and Flores Soto. His main objective, however, was to help the Gulf Cartel and Los Zetas in their gang war against the Sinaloa Cartel; rival gangsters Eloy Treviño García and Edgar Valdez Villarreal ("La Barbie") opposed Lorméndez Pitalúa's expansionist plans and ordered their associates to wage a war against them. Lorméndez Pitalúa's campaign against the Sinaloa Cartel also extended to other parts of Tamaulipas, Guerrero, Michoacán, Nuevo León and Mexico City. (Note: According to "Karen", a protected witness who worked for Los Zetas, Lorméndez Pitalúa once ordered the kidnapping and murder of an eighteen-year old individual he suspected of working for the Sinaloa Cartel in Nuevo Laredo. The suspect was tortured, burned to death, and then buried in an unknown location at a ranch owned by Víctor Manuel Vázquez Mireles ("El Cabezón").) He had the support of cartel members Mateo Díaz López, Raúl Lucio Hernández Lechuga ("El Lucky"), Héctor Manuel Sauceda Gamboa ("El Karis"), (Note: A source misspelled his name as Arturo Sauceda Gamboa.) Iván Velázquez Caballero ("El Talibán") and Miguel Treviño Morales ("Z-40").

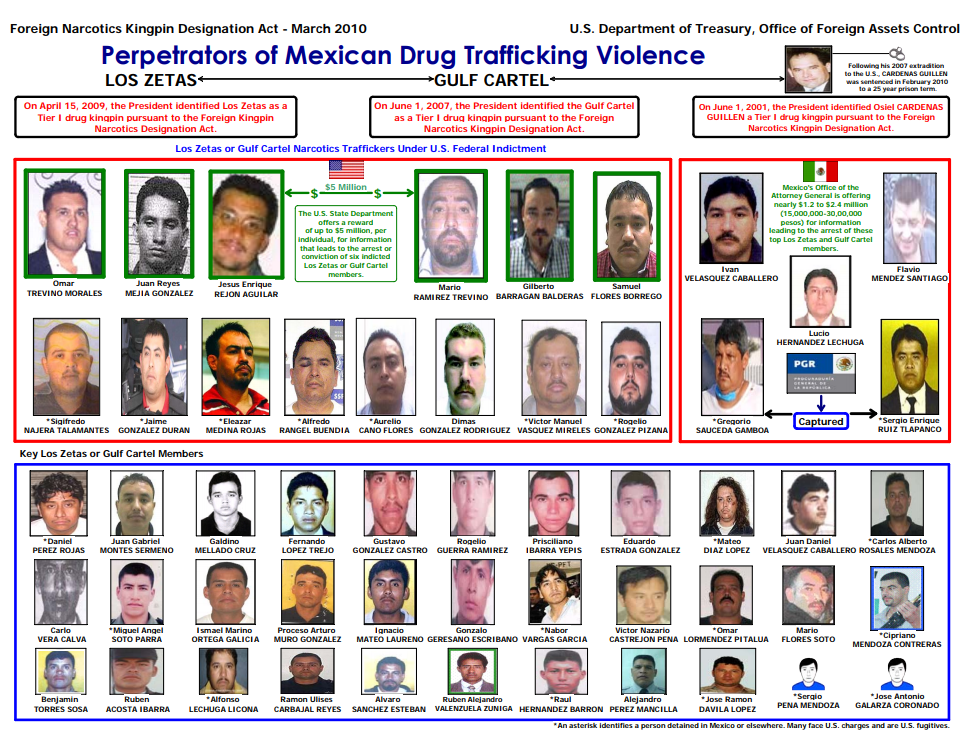
Omar Lorméndez Pitalúa pictured within the leadership chart of the Gulf Cartel and Los Zetas

In late 2003, Zetas member Flavio Méndez Santiago ("El Amarillo") and Lorméndez Pitalúa were sent to Michoacán to combat the rival forces of the Milenio Cartel and attempt to take over their territory. The rival Beltrán Leyva Cartel also operated in the area and Los Zetas was in charge of eliminating their influence in Zihuatanejo and Acapulco. Lorméndez Pitalúa was appointed as the head of Los Zetas in Michoacán by Lazcano Lazcano during a meeting held in Valle Hermoso, Tamaulipas. While in Michoacán, Lorméndez Pitalúa became a close ally of Carlos Rosales Mendoza ("El Tísico") and Servando Gómez Martínez ("La Tuta"), who headed the Michoacán-based La Familia Michoacana criminal group. As well as from working against the Milenio Cartel, Lorméndez Pitalúa was also responsible for establishing connections with authorities to help Los Zetas gain information from officials working against them. He had local authorities from Michoacán and Guerrero providing him with information and protection from the local police. (Note: The cited source mentions the municipalities of Lázaro Cárdenas and Petacalco in Guerrero. However, Lázaro Cárdenas is in Michoacán, and Petacalco is a town not a municipality.) Public officials were paid by Los Zetas to allow them to operate freely in the area without being arrested. (Note: Local official Enoc Tafolla Torres was charged with protecting La Familia Michoacana and working with Lorméndez Pitalúa. These charges were later dropped.) Lorméndez Pitalúa paid US$50,000 and more to these officials. He also bought uniforms and weapons for the police. In Michoacán, Lorméndez Pitalúa had two former Kaibiles (special forces soldiers from the Guatemalan Armed Forces) under his command. In addition to building ties with officials, he was also responsible for renting safe houses for Zetas' members in the area.

According to reports from the Subprocuraduría de Investigación Especializada en Delincuencia Organizada (SIEDO), Mexico's organized crime investigation agency, Lorméndez Pitalúa worked closely with Julio César Godoy Toscano, former Party of the Democratic Revolution (PRD) deputy in Michoacán. Godoy reportedly joined La Familia Michoacana in 2004 during a meeting with Lorméndez Pitalúa and Lázaro Cárdenas aspiring mayor Gustavo Torres Camacho. The meeting took place at the home of Rosales Mendoza's sibling Lorenzo. Federal authorities suspect that Godoy received a reported US$350,000 to support Torres Camacho's political campaign and to provide the cartel with information from the police about law enforcement operations against them. The money came directly from cartel boss Nazario Moreno González ("El Chayo").

=== Criminal charges ===
On 18 June 2003, Mexico's Attorney General's Office (PGR) placed an unspecified bounty on 31 members of Los Zetas, including Lorméndez Pitalúa. Authorities stated that Lorméndez Pitalúa was "highly dangerous" given his military background and his suspected role in homicides, drug trafficking, kidnappings and carjackings. This announcement was made after the Specialized Unit Against Organized Crime (UEDO) had identified him as a high-ranking member of Los Zetas following the 14 March arrest of Cárdenas Guillén. Unlike other Zetas' members who voluntarily requested their release from the military, Lorméndez Pitalúa had deserted and joined organized crime, which is considered high treason in a military court. He was wanted by the PGR, the Secretariat of National Defense (SEDENA) and the Secretariat of Public Security (SSP) for his outstanding charges.

From 2004 to 2009, Lorméndez Pitalúa laundered his money by using businessman Carlos Sotelo Luviano as his main strawperson. Sotelo reportedly worked for Los Zetas and managed 37 bank accounts owned by Lorméndez Pitalúa. He underwent plastic surgery multiple times to hide his identity and used the aliases Francisco Chaire Huerta and Jorge Lagunas Jaramillo to purchase assets on Lorméndez Pitalúa's behalf. The assets purchased included Pemex gas stations, houses, vehicles, and multiple commercial establishments in Morelos, Guerrero and Mexico City. Los Zetas preferred to launder money by purchasing gas stations because they viewed them as a discreet way of investing their money in the economy. Lazcano Lazcano oversaw the overall strategic initiative for Los Zetas in this market and used Lorméndez Pitalúa and his cousin Humberto Canales Lazcano ("Comandante Chivo") as his trusted business partners. Some Pemex officials and third-party contractors were complicit with Los Zetas; others who opposed their initiatives were extorted, had family members kidnapped or were killed by the cartel.

In his first year of working for Lorméndez Pitalúa, Sotelo bought a Pemex franchise and paid MXN$200,000 to be granted a license to operate. This gas station, Servicios Gasolineros San Carlos, S.A. de C.V, was based in Morelos. In 2007, he purchased another gas station in Morelos, Servicios Gasolineros Anacele, S.A. de C.V., after agreeing to pay MXN$312,000 to be granted a license to operate. When Lorméndez Pitalúa was captured in 2005, Sotelo transferred the bank accounts to Lazcano Lazcano. Sotelo was arrested in 2009 with his business partner Jaime Macedo Salgado after a judge had issued an arrest warrant for them. At the moment of his arrest, Sotelo was planning to open another gas station for Los Zetas in Guerrero. The PGR charged Sotelo with laundering at least MXN$491,812,000 in drug proceeds for Lorméndez Pitalúa and raided Sotelo's gas stations, houses and vehicles in Cuernavaca, Mexico City and Acapulco. The PGR was able to get approval from the Supreme Court of Justice of the Nation (SCJN) to expropriate the properties owned by Sotelo because they were believed to be owned by an organized crime group. When Sotelo was arrested, the government confirmed that Lorméndez Pitalúa was on trial in a federal court in the State of Mexico.

On 24 March 2010, the Office of Foreign Assets Control (OFAC), a branch of the United States Department of the Treasury, sanctioned 54 high-ranking members of the Gulf Cartel and Los Zetas, including Lorméndez Pitalúa, under the Foreign Narcotics Kingpin Designation Act (Kingpin Act). This sanction was made after U.S. and Mexican officials met in Mexico City the day before as part of the Mérida Initiative. It also included the support of the U.S. Drug Enforcement Administration (DEA) and their special operations team, which assisted the OFAC in identifying the designated suspects. The list of designated suspects included drug traffickers, money launders, hitmen, and enforcers. Several of them controlled drug trafficking operations in Tamaulipas, Nuevo León, and other parts of Mexico, and had previous drug charges in the U.S.

Though Lorméndez Pitalúa was already imprisoned in Mexico at the time of the sanction, he faced charges in the U.S. and was considered a fugitive. As part of the sanction, the U.S. government prohibited U.S. citizens from engaging in business activities with Lorméndez Pitalúa and froze all of his U.S.-based assets; this was done to reduce his financial support to the Gulf Cartel and Los Zetas and to prevent him from having access to the international financial sector. If found guilty in a civil court, Lorméndez Pitalúa would face up to US$1.075 million in fines per violation. Corporate officers could face up to US$5 million in fines and up to 30 years in prison for violations of these provisions.

== Arrest and release ==
On 21 September 2005, Mexican authorities received an anonymous tip on Lorméndez Pitalúa's whereabouts and proceeded to apprehend him in Lázaro Cárdenas. He was in possession of a fake identification card from the Federal Investigative Agency (AFI), as well as multiple firearms, grenades and communications equipment. He was initially identified by his alias Martín Hinojosa García. The arrest occurred as Lorméndez Pitalúa was heading to one of his safe houses with his henchmen. (Note: Lorméndez Pitalúa was driving the vehicle. In the passenger seat was a former Kaibil member known by his alias "Panudo". He went by three names: José María Calderón García, Édgar Geovanni Reyes López and Carlos Enrique Martínez Méndez. In the back seat were "La Parca", who went by the names Alejandro Lara and Alberto Casillas Guerrero. He was sitting next to "El Trinquetes", another former Kaibil who went by the names Juan Carlos Fuentes Castellanos and Eduardo Morales Vaidez.) He was driving a Jeep Grand Cherokee vehicle and had just kidnapped a man who was suspected of being part of the Beltrán Leyva Cartel. They stumbled across him by coincidence; Lorméndez Pitalúa had recently relocated to Lázaro Cárdenas and was driving around the city looking to purchase an air conditioning unit for his new residence. When the police closed in on him, his lookouts tried to notify his henchmen that he needed reinforcements, but he was unable to escape and was apprehended. Lorméndez Pitalúa was sent to the municipal police station where he was formally identified. He was then transported by the Mexican Air Force to Mexico City for his legal proceedings at the PGR offices.

On 16 October, a federal judge confirmed his organized crime involvement charge and ordered his transfer to the Federal Social Readaptation Center No. 2 ("Puente Grande"), a maximum-security prison in Jalisco. The other suspects who were arrested with him were also charged and transferred to the prison. After his arrest, Los Zetas placed Efraín Teodoro Torres and Gustavo González Castro ("El Erótico") as heads of the group in Michoacán. Lorméndez Pitalúa was later transferred to the Federal Social Readaptation Center No. 1 ("Altiplano"), a maximum-security prison in the State of Mexico.

In 2013, Lorméndez Pitalúa was released from prison and resumed his organized crime activities. He is part of a faction of Los Zetas known as the Zetas Vieja Escuela (English: Old School Zetas). They are rivals to the Northeast Cartel, another Zetas faction. There are numerous criminal cells under Lorméndez Pitalúa's command, including: Sangre Zeta, Grupo Operativo Zeta, Comando Zetas, El Círculo, El Extranjero, Unidad Zeta, Néctar Lima, Grupo Delta Zeta and Fuerzas Especiales Zeta. He operates primarily out of Tamaulipas, with presence in Mexican states of Tabasco, Quintana Roo and Oaxaca. Lorméndez Pitalúa had original Zetas member Luis Reyes Enríquez ("El Rex") under his command. He was responsible for helping Lorméndez Pitalúa build a network of corrupt local authorities to help in their criminal operations. (Note: Reyes Enríquez was killed by rival gangsters inside a prison on 20 November 2018.)

On 26 February 2016, members of Lorméndez Pitalúa's faction dismembered the body of a suspected rival gangster and dumped it near a gas station in Ciudad Victoria, Tamaulipas. Next to the corpse was a written message threatening authorities and civilians in the area. It was signed with the code names of Reyes Enríquez, Díaz López, Lorméndez Pitalúa and Jesús Enrique Rejón Aguilar ("El Mamito"). "This goes against all of the authorities, civilians and military, move the hell away because I am coming after whoever gets in my way or helps the fucking [Northeast Cartel]", the message read. On 20 March 2016, Mexico's PGR, SEDENA and Secretariat of the Navy (SEMAR), with the help of U.S. authorities, identified Lorméndez Pitalúa as a leading player in the Zetas Vieja Escuela faction. He was accused of being responsible for driving drug-related violence in Tamaulipas.

== See also ==
- Mexican drug war

== Bibliography ==
- Garay Salamanca, Luis; Salcedo-Albarán, Eduardo (2014). Structure of a Transnational Criminal Network: 'Los Zetas' and the Smuggling of Hydrocarbons (PDF). Vortex Foundation. SSRN 2912044. Archived from the original (PDF) on 1 July 2014.
- Grayson, George W. (2010). Mexico: Narco-Violence and a Failed State?. Transaction Publishers. p. 291. ISBN 978-1412811514.
- Grayson, George W. (2017). The Executioner's Men: Los Zetas, Rogue Soldiers, Criminal Entrepreneurs, and the Shadow State They Created. Routledge. ISBN 978-1351296021.
- Marley, David (2019). Mexican cartels: an encyclopedia of Mexico's crime and drug wars. ABC-CLIO. ISBN 9781440864766. OCLC 1096213037.
- Pérez, Ana Lilia (2012). El cártel negro: Cómo el crimen organizado se ha apoderado de Pemex. Penguin Random House Grupo Editorial México. ISBN 978-6073114301.
- Pérez, Ana Lilia (2017). PEMEX RIP: Vida y asesinato de la principal empresa mexicana (in Spanish). Penguin Random House Grupo Editorial México. ISBN 978-6073159913.
- Ravelo, Ricardo (2007). Los capos: las narco-rutas de México (in Spanish). Editorial Debolsillo. ISBN 978-9707804463.
