= Adela Navarro Bello =

Mexican journalist

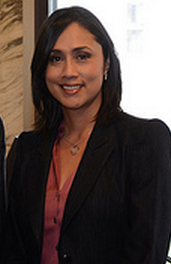
- Born: 1968 (age 56–57); Tijuana, Baja California
- Occupation: Journalist
- Organization: Zeta
- Awards: CPJ International Press Freedom Award (2007); Courage in Journalism Award (2011)

Adela Navarro Bello (born 1968 in Tijuana, Baja California, Mexico) is a Mexican journalist and the general director of the Tijuana weekly magazine Zeta. Zeta, which was founded in 1980, is one of the few publications that frequently reports on organized crime, drug trafficking, and corruption in Mexico's border cities. Multiple editors and reporters working for Zeta have been murdered, including Héctor Félix Miranda, co-founder of Zeta, and co-editor Francisco Ortiz Franco.

== Early life ==
Navarro's passion for writing dates back to her childhood, spent in a house filled with books. Her father, a rug seller, used to read at least four newspapers a day.

In college, she majored in communications. During her time there, Jesús Blancornelas, a well-known Tijuana investigative journalist, came to lecture in the college, and Navarro asked him for a job covering politics for his magazine Zeta. Navarro was hired in 1990, and Blancornelas became her mentor.

== Journalism career ==
Prior to assuming the directorship of Zeta, Navarro worked as a reporter for the magazine, covering the Chiapas conflict in 1994. She also contributed to a column to the magazine, "Sortilegioz" ("Charms"). Though her early reporting focused on Mexico's long-time ruling Institutional Revolutionary Party (PRI), she also began to report on corruption in the National Action Party (PAN) after its members assumed office. In 1994, Navarro became the first woman on the paper's five-person editing staff.

Blancornelas died of cancer in 2006, leaving control of the magazine to Navarro and his son, César René Blanco Villalón. Wearied by the deaths of several of his editors, Blancornelas had begun to doubt Zeta's ability to foster change, and had considered closing the magazine with his death, but Navarro and Blanco persuaded him to let the magazine continue.

As the magazine's new director, Navarro continued Blancornelas' tradition of high-risk reporting on organized crime, stating that "Every time a journalist self-censors, the whole society loses". She oversaw an investigation of former Tijuana mayor Jorge Hank Rhon, whose guards had murdered Zeta columnist and co-founder Héctor Félix Miranda. Following Hank's arrest in 2011 on illegal weapons charges, the magazine published the details and serial numbers of the 88 guns found in his home; the issue sold out, and the number of page views caused the magazine's website to crash. Though Hank was released for lack of evidence, Navarro continued to press for his arrest for involvement in the Félix murder.

Zeta was criticized in 2009 and 2010 for being too sympathetic to the Mexican Army and failing to cover its alleged human rights abuses; the magazine named an army general its "person of the year" each year.

In January 2010, US law enforcement notified Navarro of death threats from the Tijuana Cartel, causing the Mexican government to assign her seven soldiers as bodyguards. One month later, ten people were arrested for plotting a grenade attack against Zeta's offices.

== Awards and recognition ==
In 2007, Navarro won an International Press Freedom Award from the Committee to Protect Journalists. The award is given for journalists who show courage in defending press freedom in the face of attacks, threats or imprisonment. CPJ also produced a short video about Navarro Bello and Zeta. She is also the recipient of a 2011 International Women's Media Foundation Courage in Journalism award.

In 1999, Navarro was commissioned by the U.S. Department of State to undertake a six-city U.S. tour with the theme of "migration". She has also been awarded the 2008 Prize Ortega y Gasset, given by the country of Spain; the 2009 International Prize of Freedom of the Press, given by Editorial Perfil, Argentina; and the Anna Politkovskaja Prize, Festival Internazionale a Ferrara, Italia in 2009. In 2010, the Missouri School of Journalism awarded her its Missouri Honor Medal for Distinguished Service in Journalism.

In 2012, she was named by Foreign Policy magazine to the FP Top 100 Global Thinkers. The following year, she was listed among the "50 Most Powerful Women in Mexico" by Forbes magazine.

Navarro and Zeta are profiled in the Bernardo Ruiz documentary Reportero.

== In popular culture ==
Andrea Nuñez's character, played by Luisa Rubino in season three of Narcos: Mexico, is loosely based on Navarro.
