= José Galicot =

Mexican businessman and promoter of Tijuana (born 1937)

- Born: José Galicot Behar; 1 October 1937 (age 89); Santa Bárbara, Chihuahua, Mexico
- Occupations: Businessman, writer
- Known for: Co-founding Tijuana Innovadora
- Spouse: Chana Galicot

José "Pepe" Galicot Behar (born 1 October 1937) is a Mexican businessman and writer based in Tijuana, Baja California. After working in retail, nightlife and real estate, he became known as a promoter of the city, most prominently as a co-founder of Tijuana Innovadora. Its first edition, in 2010, was a festival meant to improve Tijuana's image during the Mexican drug war, and it later became a year-round civic organization. He has written a newspaper column and several books about Tijuana and Baja California.

== Early life ==
Galicot was born in Santa Bárbara, Chihuahua, to Matilde Behar and Rafael Galicot, a Sephardic Jew from Istanbul who had reached Mexico through Veracruz in 1920. After a short stay in Mexico City, the family moved to Tijuana in 1946, when he was nine, following his maternal grandfather. The family arrived poor, and as a boy he sold textiles.

He went to primary school in Tijuana, then to the Colegio Hebreo Sefaradí in Mexico City and the Escuela Nacional Preparatoria of the National Autonomous University of Mexico, where, he has said, Carlos Slim was a classmate. He studied civil engineering and economics. In Mexico City he led the Federación Juvenil Sionista, a Zionist youth federation.

== Business career ==
Galicot built a beauty-supply business that grew from a single store into a large wholesale supplier; it collapsed after a devaluation of the peso. With the architect Jack Winer he then opened Oh!, a Tijuana discotheque that was popular for about ten years until it closed after a failed sale. He later turned to real estate, buying and building properties in Tijuana, Mexico City, Cancún, Playa del Carmen and Cabo San Lucas. By 2010 he owned the Plaza Viva Tijuana shopping center. His sons Rafael and Gregorio run BBG Communications, a prepaid telephone company.

== Civic work ==
=== Murals and the arts ===
Before Tijuana Innovadora, Galicot led a campaign to paint murals in the city's road tunnels. He has said that he and friends paid for 87 murals around Tijuana and for an exhibition of work by Raúl Anguiano. He later set up the Sala Raúl Anguiano, a traveling exhibition space.

=== Tijuana Innovadora ===
According to the Associated Press, the idea for Tijuana Innovadora came to Galicot in 2009, when he needed surgery and learned that Tijuana was a major producer of medical equipment. The first edition, in October 2010, was a two-week festival costing about US$5 million that showcased the city's industry and culture. Speakers included Al Gore, Carlos Slim, Biz Stone and Jimmy Wales, and President Felipe Calderón attended the opening. To support the event, Galicot asked local newspaper editors to run only positive stories on their front pages for two weeks.

Galicot co-founded the event with Alejandro Bustamante Gutiérrez and Tomás Perrín Escobar. By 2017 he chaired and largely funded it. In a 2017 interview he credited his daughter Jaye with the original idea and with recruiting speakers for the first two editions. Further editions were held in 2012, 2014, 2016 and 2020. The organization now runs year-round programs in art, leadership, sustainability, entrepreneurship and violence prevention, among them a youth symphony and the city's Paseo de la Fama, which each year honors people from Baja California.

In 2022 the Tijuana civic group Grupo 21 named Galicot its Personaje del Año (Person of the Year) for his work for the city.

== Writing ==
At the invitation of Jesús Blancornelas, co-founder of the Tijuana weekly Zeta, Galicot began writing a column for the paper in the 1980s and kept it up for about twenty years. He returned to it in 2023 after a five-year break. His books include Facetas, a collection of his columns, Pobre península, Californiadas, La Tía Juana, Presencias de la ciudad and Andanzas y vericuetos (2024).
