= Alejandro Bustamante =

Mexican business executive

- Born: Alejandro Bustamante Gutiérrez; Tijuana, Baja California, Mexico
- Education: Universidad La Salle (BBA); Pepperdine University (MBA, 1982)
- Occupation: Business executive
- Employer: Plantronics (later Poly)
- Known for: Co-founding Tijuana Innovadora
- Title: President of Plantronics de México (Plamex)
- Spouse: Lorena Bustamante

Alejandro Bustamante Gutiérrez is a Mexican business executive from Tijuana, Baja California. He has led Plantronics de México (Plamex), the Tijuana manufacturing operation of the headset maker Plantronics, since 1994, and later became the company's global vice president of operations. He is a co-founder of the civic festival and organization Tijuana Innovadora.

== Education ==
Bustamante earned a bachelor's degree in business administration from the Universidad La Salle in Mexico City and an MBA from Pepperdine University in 1982. He later took postgraduate courses at UCLA and Harvard.

== Career ==
Before joining Plantronics, Bustamante was an executive vice president at Matrix Aeronáutica and at Offshore Factories. He became president of Plamex in 1994. Under his leadership the plant grew to about 3,000 employees and became known for low staff turnover and benefits including education programs, medical care and housing assistance. It is the only facility to have won both the Ibero-American and the Asia-Pacific quality awards.

In December 2013 Bustamante, by then Plantronics' worldwide vice president of operations, opened a new 73,896 m^{2} (795,410 sq ft) plant in Tijuana that brought more than 2,200 workers, previously spread across four buildings, under one roof. The company put the investment and operating costs at over US$100 million, and about 70% of the plant's power was to come from solar panels. In 2014 Forbes México profiled the Tijuana operation as a model employer. When the company, renamed Poly, marked 50 years in Tijuana in June 2022, Bustamante was its executive vice president of international operations and president of Plamex.

== Public and civic work ==
Bustamante represented Mexico's private sector in the negotiations for the North American Free Trade Agreement and took part in drafting Mexico's national development plan for 1995–2000. He has served on government programs on industrial quality and competitiveness, coordinated between the Conalep technical-school system and private industry, and been active in Project Concern International and the Castro Limón Foundation. He has also served as president of the Tijuana firefighters' association.

In 2010 he co-founded Tijuana Innovadora with José Galicot and Tomás Perrín Escobar, as a festival to counter Tijuana's image during the Mexican drug war and to showcase the region's technology and industry.

== Recognition ==
Pepperdine University named Bustamante one of its Distinguished Alumni in 2008.

== Personal life ==
Bustamante and his wife, Lorena, live in Chula Vista, California.
