= Jesús Blancornelas =

Mexican journalist (1936–2006)

- Born: November 14, 1936; San Luis Potosí, Mexico
- Died: November 23, 2006 (aged 70); Tijuana, Baja California, Mexico
- Occupation: Journalist
- Spouse: Genoveva Villalón de Blanco
- Children: José Jesús; Ramón Tomás; César René
- Awards: CPJ International Press Freedom Award (1996); UNESCO/Guillermo Cano World Press Freedom Prize (1999); World Press Freedom Hero (2000)

J. Jesús Blancornelas (November 14, 1936 – November 23, 2006) was a Mexican journalist who co-founded the Tijuana-based Zeta magazine, known for its reporting on corruption and drug trafficking. His work encompassed extensive research on how the drug industry influences local leaders and the police in the Mexican state of Baja California – topics frequently avoided by the rest of the Mexican media.

As the author of six books, Blancornelas was regarded by the press as a leading expert on organized crime and drug trafficking during his time. He was also the first man to publish a photograph of Ramón Arellano Félix, the former drug lord of the Tijuana Cartel. In response to the photo publication, the cartel attempted to kill Blancornelas in 1997, but he managed to survive the attack and continued to report on the workings of Mexico's criminal underworld.

For more than two decades, Blancornelas received several international press awards for his defiance of Mexico's old regime status quo, where bribe-taking and censorship by the government were commonplace in Mexico's media. After his death, the Los Angeles Times and the Committee to Protect Journalists described him as "the spiritual godfather of modern Mexican journalism." Blancornelas is also regarded as a pioneer in the push for press freedom in Mexico.

== Early career ==
A native of San Luis Potosí born on November 14, 1936, Blancornelas began his career as a journalist for El Sol de San Luis in April 1955, working as a sportswriter. In 1960, he moved to Tijuana, Baja California, where he became active in reporting on corruption and the drug trade. He was promoted to news editor at the daily newspaper El Mexicano before moving to the daily La Voz de la Frontera, of which he became editor-in-chief. Unlike several other journalists during his time, Blancornelas was eager to write about drug trafficking and corruption, leading to his firing from three newspapers before deciding to create his own. (Note: However, another source says he was fired from five newspapers.)

In 1977, he founded a newspaper called ABC. The paper employed future Zeta co-founder Héctor Félix Miranda, then a columnist who wrote under "Félix el Gato" ("Felix the Cat") to criticize local politicians. These columns eventually angered Baja California's state government and Mexico's former President José López Portillo to the point that the government ordered Blancornelas to fire Miranda and banned its distribution. When Blancornelas refused, a SWAT team was sent to take over the paper's offices on the pretext of settling a labor dispute. Blancornelas escaped to the United States, resettling in San Diego, California.

== Zeta ==
In 1980, Blancornelas re-surfaced with a new weekly publication known as Zeta, which he co-founded with Félix. The magazine printed copies in the United States and then smuggled them across the border into Mexico. After some years, they reestablished themselves in Tijuana. Through the magazine, the pair continued their investigation into organized crime and corruption. The magazine ran a cover story in 1985 about local police guarding a marijuana-filled warehouse; the story was the first to report on the future leaders of the Tijuana Cartel, the Arellano Félix brothers. After Blancornelas discovered that plainclothes police officers had bought all 20,000 copies of the issue, Zeta republished the issue under the headline "Censored!"

Héctor Félix Miranda was assassinated by multiple shotgun blasts in 1988; two guards from the Agua Caliente Racetrack were later convicted of the murder. For the next 18 years, Blancornelas left Félix Miranda's name on the Zeta masthead, marked with a black cross. He also published a full-page ad in every issue under Félix's "byline", asking the employer of the Agua Caliente Racetrack guards, Tijuana politician Jorge Hank Rhon, why Félix Miranda had been assassinated.

In 1994, Zeta published an investigation on the assassination of Luis Donaldo Colosio; despite the conspiracy theories about the case, the magazine concluded that the shooting had been the work of a single troubled individual.

In the 2000s, Blancornelas wanted to remove bylines from Zeta's most dangerous stories, but was persuaded not to by reporter Francisco Ortiz, who wished his to continue to run atop his stories on organized crime. In 2005, Ortiz was shot to death in front of his children, and Blancornelas began his no-byline policy. In the days after Ortiz's death, he stated, "I feel remorse for having created Zeta. After losing three colleagues, I believe the price has been too high. I would have liked to retire a long time ago ... [but] I cannot allow drug traffickers to think that they were able to crush Zeta's spirit, and our readers to believe that we are afraid."

Blancornelas covered the rise of Mexico's drug trafficking organizations for more than thirty years, but his best work in the field took place during the 1990s.

During this period, Mexico experienced the rise of three powerful drug cartels: the Tijuana Cartel in the west; the Juárez Cartel in Ciudad Juárez; and the Gulf Cartel in the east. Blancornelas's stories are reportedly so crucial that almost every written account of the Tijuana Cartel cites him.

== Assassination attempt ==
In November 1996, Blancornelas was planning to visit New York City to receive an international award for his work in covering the drug trade, political corruption, and the relationship between the drug lords and the police. A few days before he was about to fly, a policeman in Tijuana visited Blancornelas and warned him that he was risking his life if he decided to go. A year later, the warning proved to be true: in 1997 in Tijuana, Blancornelas was ambushed and wounded by gunmen of the Tijuana Cartel while heading to the airport to publish a photo of the drug lord Ramón Arellano Félix. Blancornelas was nearly killed when the attackers opened fire on his car, wounding him in the abdomen and killing his driver and bodyguard, Luis Valero Elizalde, who died protecting him and managed to kill one of the shooters. Blancornelas suffered complications from the injury for the rest of his life. In the attack, Blancornelas's car was hit more than 180 times, but only four bullets penetrated the journalist's body. Elizalde, however, was hit 38 times. That same year, three other prominent journalists were killed in Mexico.

The nature of Blancornelas's work forced him to live under a "self-imposed home arrest," only traveling to his workplace and home with multiple Special Forces bodyguards from the Mexican Army, who accompanied him everywhere. While previous attacks on journalists received little coverage, Blancornelas's assassination attempt made it to the frontpage of most newspapers in Mexico, and was covered on the television and radio. The attempt also fueled interest internationally; the New York Times, Los Angeles Times, San Diego Union Tribune, and the National Public Radio covered it extensively. Due to the public outcry, the Mexican authorities decided to report the attack to the Office of the General Prosecutor, which had greater resources than the state authorities.

After spending 20 days in the hospital, Blancornelas recovered from his wounds and returned to publishing for the Zeta magazine. He left the hospital with a walker and was escorted by municipal, judicial, state and federal policemen, along with soldiers of the Mexican Army, to his home in La Mesa delegation in Tijuana. As he got to his home, a crowd of reporters awaited Blancornelas, who allowed them to take pictures of him but refused to answer any questions. "I'll be back as soon as possible," Blancornelas said to the reporters as he entered his home. He also thanked the media for covering his assassination attempt.

The Blancornelas family erected a huge brick wall in their one-story house to increase their security measures; outside the house, a squadron of military men guarded the family, while some others protected the Zeta offices. As of 1998, the top editors of the newspaper, along with Blancornelas's three sons, were under guard by the authorities at all times.

Marco Arturo Quiñones Sánchez, whom Mexican authorities alleged to be a hit man for the Tijuana Cartel, was later charged with being one of the gunmen in the attack on Blancornelas, but was found not guilty by a judge in 2013.

== Death ==
In the last years of his life, Blancornelas lived as a virtual prisoner, always accompanied by an escort of fifteen armed guards. He died in the border city of Tijuana on November 23, 2006, in Del Prado Hospital, from complications of stomach cancer, possibly caused by the embedded bullets he received when he was shot. Blancornelas was taken to the hospital on November 19 after his son confessed that his father had a lung defect that dated back to his youth. Prior to his death, Blancornelas stopped reporting directly for the Zeta magazine since February 2006 but still sent information to the magazine, particularly on issues covering drug trafficking.

Beginning to doubt Zeta's ability to foster change, Blancornelas considered closing the magazine with his death. Editor Adela Navarro Bello and Blancornelas's son, César René Blanco Villalón, however, persuaded him to let the magazine continue and succeeded him as its co-publishers.

Just before his death, Blancornelas speculated that the Tijuana Cartel had placed a US$250,000 bounty on his assassination, and publicly declared his desire to interview Enedina Arellano Félix, a female drug lord of the cartel, to confirm the information.

He was survived by his wife, Genoveva Villalón de Blanco, and their three sons: José Jesús, Ramón Tomás and César René.

While Blancornelas's reporting helped bring some drug lords to justice, the Mexican drug trafficking organizations grew more powerful after his death. As he said in an interview shortly before dying:

El Narco used to be in certain states. But now it has grown across the whole of the Mexican republic. Soon El Narco will knock on the door of the presidential palace. It will knock on the door of the attorney general's office. And this will present a great danger.

== Awards ==
In 1996, he was one of four winners of the US-based CPJ International Press Freedom Awards, which honor journalists who show courage in defending press freedom despite facing attacks, threats, or imprisonment. He also won the Maria Moors Cabot Prize of Columbia University and was honored as the International Editor of the Year by the World Press Review in 1998. Blancornelas was also UNESCO/Guillermo Cano World Press Freedom Prize in 1999. In 2000 he was named one of the Austria-based International Press Institute's fifty World Press Freedom Heroes of the previous fifty years.

El Periodista ("The Journalist"), a corrido (ballad) in memory of Blancornelas, was written by members of the band Los Tucanes de Tijuana. (Note: Corridos often have a different slant. As this musical format has been revived, the "narcocorrido" has arisen.)

Zeta and Blancornelas are profiled in the Bernardo Ruiz documentary Reportero.

== In popular culture ==
The character of Ramón Salgado, played by Alex Furth in season three of Narcos: Mexico, is loosely based on Jesús Blancornelas.

== Published works by Jesús Blancornelas ==
- Biebrich, crónica de una infamia. México: Editores Asociados Mexicanos. 1979. ISBN 9684090323.
- El tiempo pasa: de Lomas Taurinas a Los Pinos. México, D.F: Océano. 1997. ISBN 9706511024.
- Pasaste a mi lado. Tijuana México, D.F: Centro Cultural Tijuana. 1997. ISBN 9686412093.
- Una vez nada más. México, D.F: Océano. 1997. ISBN 9706510443.
- Conversaciones Privadas. México: Ediciones B. México. 2001. ISBN 9707100559.
- El cártel: Los Arellano Félix: la mafia más poderosa en la historia de América Latina. México, D.F: Random House/Debolsillo, 2008. 2010. ISBN 978-9707809628. "The Cartel: The Arellano Félix: The Most Powerful Mafia in the History of Latin America."

== Bibliography ==
=== Sources ===
- Chepesiuk, Ron (1999). The War on Drugs: An International Encyclopedia. Santa Barbara, California: ABC-CLIO. p. 15. ISBN 0874369851. "1998 editor of the year world press review blancornelas."
- Dawson, Alexander (2006). First World Dreams: Mexico Since 1989 (1st ed.). Nova Scotia New York: Fernwood Publishing, Zed Books. p. 80. ISBN 1842776614. "jesus blancornelas."
- Fox, Elizabeth (2002). Latin Politics, Global Media (1st ed.). Austin, Texas: University of Texas Press. ISBN 029272537X.
- Grillo, Ioan (2012). El Narco: Inside Mexico's Criminal Insurgency (2nd ed.). New York: Bloomsbury Publishing. ISBN 978-1608192113.
- Jordan, Mary (2006). The Prison Angel: Mother Antonia's Journey from Beverly Hills to a Life of Service in a Mexican Jail (1st ed.). New York: Penguin Group. ISBN 014303717X.
- Romero, Fernando (2008). Hyperborder: The Contemporary U.S.? Mexico Border and Its Future (1st ed.). New York: Princeton Architectural Press. ISBN 978-1568987064.
- Standish, Peter (2004). Culture and Customs of Mexico (1st ed.). Westport, Connecticut: Greenwood Publishing Group. p. 96. ISBN 0313304122. "jesus blancornelas."
- Weinberg, Bill (2002). Homage to Chiapas: The New Indigenous Struggles in Mexico (1st ed.). London. New York: Verso Books. ISBN 1859843727.
- Yearly, Patrick (2008). They Were Giants (1st ed.). Lincoln, Nebraska: iUniverse. ISBN 978-0595489459.

== See also ==
- List of journalists killed in Mexico
- Mexican drug war
