= Zeta (magazine) =

Mexican magazine

- Editor: Jesús Blancornelas (1980-2006); Adela Navarro Bello (2006-present)
- Circulation: 30,000 (Print)
- Founder: Jesús Blancornelas, Héctor Félix Miranda, Francisco Ortiz Franco
- Founded: 1980
- Country: Mexico
- Based in: Tijuana, Baja California
- Language: Spanish
- Website: zetatijuana.com

Zeta is a Mexican magazine published every Friday in Tijuana by Choix Editores. Zeta is distributed primarily in Baja California, in the cities of Tijuana, Tecate, Rosarito, Ensenada, and Mexicali.

It was founded in 1980 by Jesús Blancornelas, known as "the spiritual godfather of modern Mexican journalism", along with Héctor Félix Miranda and Francisco Ortiz Franco. The magazine regularly runs exposés on corruption in local and federal governments as well as on organized crime and drug trafficking, resulting in numerous threats and attacks against its staff. Félix was murdered in 1988 by bodyguards of politician Jorge Hank Rhon, while Ortiz was assassinated in 2004, apparently for his coverage of the Tijuana Cartel. Blancornelas was also ambushed by gunmen in 1997; though one of his bodyguards was killed, Blancornelas managed to survive his wounds. Following Blancornelas's death of stomach cancer in 2006, Adela Navarro Bello became Zeta's editor-in-chief. Both Blancornelas and Navarro received numerous international awards for their work with the magazine.

More than half of the journalists working for the Zeta report on sport events, entertainment, and art, but the front-page stories on the newspaper are about drug trafficking and political corruption. Since its creation, the newspaper chronicled the rise and workings of the Tijuana Cartel, one of Mexico's oldest drug trafficking organizations.

== Early history ==
In 1977, Jesús Blancornelas founded the independent newspaper ABC. The paper employed future Zeta co-founder Héctor Félix Miranda, then a columnist who wrote under "Félix el Gato" ("Felix the Cat") to criticize local politicians. These columns eventually angered Baja California's state government and Mexico's former President José López Portillo to the point that the government ordered Blancornelas to fire Miranda and banned its distribution. When Blancornelas refused, a SWAT team was sent to take over the paper's offices on the pretext of settling a labor dispute. Blancornelas escaped to the United States, resettling in San Diego, California.

In 1980, Blancornelas re-surfaced with the weekly publication Zeta, which he co-founded with Félix. The magazine printed copies in the United States and then smuggled them across the border into Mexico. After some years, they reestablished themselves in Tijuana. Through the magazine, the pair continued their investigation into organized crime and corruption. The magazine ran a cover story in 1985 about local police guarding a marijuana-filled warehouse; the story was the first to report on the future leaders of the Tijuana Cartel, the Arellano Félix brothers. After Blancornelas discovered that plainclothes police officers had bought all 20,000 copies of the issue, Zeta republished the issue under the headline "Censored!" In 1987, the Zeta magazine lived an attack, when two men in a brown Toyota pick-up truck opened fire at the installations one morning.

In 1994, Zeta published an investigation on the assassination of Luis Donaldo Colosio; despite the conspiracy theories about the case, the magazine concluded that the shooting had been the work of a single troubled individual.

== Héctor Félix Miranda murder ==
As well as acting as an editor, Héctor Félix Miranda contributed a column titled "A Little of Something", in which he satirized and criticized government officials, particularly those of the long-ruling Institutional Revolutionary Party (PRI). He particularly targeted Jorge Hank Rhon, son of a former Mexico City mayor and the owner of a Tijuana racetrack.

Félix was killed by multiple shotgun blasts in 1988. Two guards from Hank Rhon's Agua Caliente Racetrack were later convicted of the murder.

For the next eighteen years, Blancornelas left Félix's name on the Zeta masthead, marked with a black cross. He also published a full-page ad in every issue under Félix's "byline", asking Hank Rhon why Félix had been murdered.

== Blancornelas assassination attempt ==
In 1997 in Tijuana, Blancornelas was ambushed and wounded by gunmen of the Tijuana Cartel after he published a photo of the drug lord Ramón Arellano Félix. Blancornelas was nearly killed when the attackers opened fire on his car, wounding him in the abdomen and killing his driver and bodyguard, Luis Valero Elizalde, who died protecting him and managed to kill one of the shooters. Blancornelas suffered complications from the injury for the rest of his life. In the attack, Blancornelas' car was hit more than 180 times, but only four bullets penetrated the journalist's body. Valero, however, was hit 38 times.

The nature of Blancornelas' work forced him to live under a "self-imposed home arrest," only traveling to his workplace and home with multiple Special Forces bodyguards from the Mexican Army, who accompanied him everywhere. While previous attacks on journalists had received little coverage, Blancornelas' assassination attempt made it to the front page of most newspapers in Mexico, and was covered on television and radio. The attempt also fueled international attention, as the New York Times, Los Angeles Times, San Diego Union Tribune, and National Public Radio covered it extensively. Due to the public outcry, the Mexican authorities decided to report the attack to the Office of the General Prosecutor, which had greater resources than the state authorities.

After Blancornelas recovered from his wounds, he returned to publishing for the Zeta magazine. The Blancornelas family erected a huge brick wall in their one-story house to increase their security measures; outside the house, a squadron of military men guarded the family, while some others protected the Zeta offices. As of 1998, the top editors of the newspaper, along with Blancornelas' three sons, were under guard by the authorities at all times.

== Francisco Ortiz Franco murder ==
In 2004, Francisco Ortiz Franco—a Zeta cofounder and contributing editor who specialized in legal issues—began to write about drug trafficking. At around this time, Blancornelas wanted to remove bylines from Zeta's most dangerous stories, but was persuaded not to by Ortiz, who wished his to continue to run.

On June 22, 2004, Ortiz was shot three times at the wheel of his car by masked gunmen in a drive-by shooting, in full view of his son and daughter (aged 9 and 11). Federal prosecutors later linked the murder to the Tijuana Cartel of the Arellano Félix family, with Ortiz's coverage of the organization as the probable motive. In April 2011, Zeta's new editor Adela Navarro Bello ran a front-page story stating that the newspaper had learned from cartel enforcer Luis Alberto Salazar Vega that cartel head Javier Arellano Félix had personally ordered the murder after Ortiz had published photographs of the organization's members.

== Navarro Bello directorship ==
Prior his death from cancer in 2006, Blancornelas, disheartened by the deaths of his co-founders and beginning to doubt Zeta's ability to foster change, considered closing the magazine with his death. Editor Adela Navarro Bello and his son César René Blanco Villalón persuaded him to let the magazine continue, however, and succeeded him as the magazine's co-publishers.

As the magazine's new director, Navarro continued Blancornelas' tradition of high-risk reporting on organized crime, stating that "Every time a journalist self-censors, the whole society loses". She oversaw an investigation of Hank Rhon, whose guards had murdered Félix Miranda, and following Hank's arrest in 2011 on illegal weapons charges, the magazine published the details and serial numbers of the 88 guns found in his home. The issue sold out, and the number of page views caused the magazine's website to crash. Though Hank was released for lack of evidence, Navarro continued to press for his arrest for involvement in the Félix murder. The magazine also began to publish increasing coverage of corruption allegations against the National Action Party as the party continued to gain power. The magazine was also criticized in 2009 and 2010, however, for being too sympathetic to the Mexican Army and failing to cover its alleged human rights abuses; Zeta named an army general its "person of the year" in each year.

In January 2010, US law enforcement notified Navarro of death threats from the Tijuana Cartel, causing the Mexican government to assign her seven soldiers as bodyguards. One month later, ten people were arrested for plotting a grenade attack against Zeta's offices. The Zeta offices are located in a residential neighborhood in Tijuana, but all of the printing is done in San Diego to avoid any reprisals from organized crime, with the printed magazines trucked in across the border. It has a printing circulation of 30,000, but waits up to three days to put its drug trafficking reports online to compel readers to buy the print version. In 2012, the Zeta is still thriving in Tijuana with its weekly column of "who's who in the underworld of Mexico's Baja California peninsula," and with unique stories of drug traffickers rarely seen anywhere else in the Mexican media. Most media outlets in Mexico limit their reports to government statements and news conferences, while others cover the drug war aggressively. Few of the national media outlets, however, have the intensity and in-depth coverage of the Zeta magazine.

== Awards ==
Blancornelas won several international awards for his work with Zeta, including the 1996 International Press Freedom Award of the US-based Committee to Protect Journalists and the 1999 UNESCO/Guillermo Cano World Press Freedom Prize. In 2000 he was named one of the Austria-based International Press Institute's fifty World Press Freedom Heroes of the previous fifty years. Navarro also received the International Press Freedom Award for her work with the magazine in 2007.

Zeta and Blancornelas are profiled in the Bernardo Ruiz documentary Reportero.

== Bibliography ==
- Dawson, Alexande (2006). First World Dreams: Mexico Since 1989 (1 ed.). Zed Books. p. 80. ISBN 1842776614. "jesus blancornelas."
- Fox, Elizabeth (2002). Latin Politics, Global Media (1st ed.). Austin, Texas: University of Texas Press. ISBN 029272537X.
- Jordan, Mary (2006). The Prison Angel: Mother Antonia's Journey from Beverly Hills to a Life of Service in a Mexican Jail (1st ed.). Penguin Group. ISBN 014303717X.
- Romero, Fernando (2007). Hyperborder: The Contemporary U.S.? Mexico Border and Its Future (1st ed.). Princeton Architectural Press. ISBN 978-1568987064.
- Standish, Peter (2004). Culture and Customs of Mexico (1st ed.). Greenwood Publishing Group. p. 96. ISBN 0313304122. "jesus blancornelas."
- Weinberg, Bill (2002). Homage to Chiapas: The New Indigenous Struggles in Mexico (1 ed.). Verso Books. ISBN 1859843727.
