= Francisco Ortiz Franco =

Mexican crime journalist and murder victim

Francisco Javier Ortiz Franco
- Born: 1954; Dolores Hidalgo, Guanajuato, Mexico
- Died: June 22, 2004; Tijuana, Baja California, Mexico
- Occupation: Zeta journalist
- Known for: 2004 murder

Francisco Javier Ortiz Franco (1954 in Dolores Hidalgo, Guanajuato – June 22, 2004 in Tijuana, Baja California) was a Mexican journalist, who was murdered after writing about drug trafficking.

== Biography ==
Prior to his work as a journalist, Ortiz trained as a lawyer. In 1980, he joined Jesús Blancornelas and Héctor Félix Miranda in founding Zeta, a weekly magazine known for its coverage of organized crime, drug trafficking, and government corruption. Ortiz served as an editor and also wrote a column for the magazine on legal issues.

In 2004, Ortiz began to write about drug trafficking. At around this time, Zeta's editor-in-chief Jesús Blancornelas wanted to remove bylines from Zeta's most dangerous stories, but was persuaded not to by Ortiz, who wished his to continue to run.

== Death ==
On June 22, 2004, Ortiz was shot three or four times at the wheel of his car by masked gunmen in a drive-by shooting. The murder took place in full view of his son and daughter (aged 9 and 11), as he left a midday doctor's appointment.

Four days later, dozens of journalists marched in protest of the murder. On June 28, rallies against crime occurred in at least 10 Mexican cities, drawing hundreds of thousands of participants.

Blancornelas, who had also lost another Zeta co-founder, Héctor Félix Miranda, to murder in 1988, stated, "I feel remorse for having created Zeta. After losing three colleagues, I believe the price has been too high. I would have liked to retire a long time ago ... [but] I cannot allow drug traffickers to think that they were able to crush Zeta's spirit, and our readers to believe that we are afraid."

Zeta published a list of suspects obtained from the Attorney General of Mexico that included the Tijuana Cartel (Arellano-Félix family), Los Zetas, and Jorge Hank Rhon, a businessman whose bodyguards had been convicted for killing Héctor Félix Miranda. Ortiz was Miranda's lawyer and he was seeking to reopen the case.

Federal prosecutors later linked the murder to the Tijuana Cartel, leaving other options open, with Ortiz's coverage of the organization as the probable motive. In April 2011, the new editor of Zeta, Adela Navarro Bello ran a front-page story stating that the newspaper had learned from cartel enforcer Luis Alberto Salazar Vega that cartel head Javier Arellano Félix had personally ordered the murder after Ortiz had published photographs of the organization's members. Still, the investigation reached no conclusion and remains open with no identified suspects or arrests.

== See also ==
- List of journalists killed in Mexico
