= Borderland Beat =

English-language news blog

- Website type: News Blog, Forum
- Available in: English
- Creator: Alex Marentes (pen name: Buggs)
- Website: BorderlandBeat.com
- Launched: 2009
- Current status: Active

Borderland Beat is an English language news blog that reports on the Mexican drug war. The blog was started in 2009 by an anonymous individual using the pseudonym Buggs. Borderland Beat's reporters are mostly based in the U.S. and Mexico. Their main focus is to provide English coverage of the drug war in Mexico, by creating analysis and research material about drug cartels, criminal figures, and the effects on the ongoing drug war, as well as translating Spanish articles into English.

== Origins ==
Borderland Beat was started in 2009 by "Buggs" (Alex Marentes), a retired Albuquerque Police Department officer and former active duty and reserve U.S. Marine. Buggs' intention was to report about the Mexican drug war to U.S. readers. Buggs began translating Mexican drug cartel news articles from Spanish to English in mid-2008, but was using his personal blog as a platform. Realizing the dangers of reporting on his personal blog, he created Borderland Beat and hosted it on Blogger, a platform owned by Google. Buggs came up with the name of the blog because "borderland" refers to a geographical space or zone around a territorial border, in this case the U.S.-Mexico border. Buggs was born in the El Paso–Juárez border area and Borderland Beat initially started by covering drug cartel violence in this area. The word "beat" stands for a specific territory that law enforcement operate in. Once the blog was launched, Buggs created his pen name to protect his identity; only a few people in his circle knew his real identity.

== Reporters and contributors ==
The project is run by volunteer reporters based in the U.S. and Mexico. Borderland Beat claims that none of the reporters meet face-to-face and only maintain contact through the platform and via email. All Borderland Beat reporters conceal their identities and other personal information. Some posts are sometimes passed down through intermediaries to protect their integrity. "They could be journalists, cops, politicians, maybe even cartel members themselves," Buggs said in an interview. In addition, several reporters have passed through Borderland Beat's editorial board over the years, including some that "disappeared" from the online community without prior notice, like former Borderland Beat reporters "Iliana" and "Rise Machiavelli". Borderland Beat stated that they do not know if they are dead or alive. The most active contributor throughout Borderland Beat's history was "Chivis Martinez", a female reporter based in Mexico. She initially covered cartel violence in Coahuila and eventually in 2013, she took over the everyday management and operation of the blog. As the website does not run advertisements and receives no funding, contributing reporters are unpaid.

== History and content ==
Borderland Beat posts news about the Mexican Drug War on a daily basis. Their objective is to inform the English-speaking world about drug cartel violence. They sometimes work in collaboration with other media outlets and think tanks (such as Small Wars Journal and InSight Crime) by sharing their news articles for references and by allowing them to partially or fully republish their material. Although not initially trained in journalism, Buggs created Borderland Beat out of a "necessity to inform" readers about the drug violence in Mexico, considering the censorship by traditional media.

The first article published by Borderland Beat was titled "Los Capos" (English: The Drug Kingpins), which included the list of Mexico's 37 most-wanted drug lords. The article included the names of the wanted fugitives, their aliases and bounties, and the cartels they were working: the Sinaloa Cartel, Tijuana Cartel, Gulf Cartel, Los Zetas, La Familia Michoacana, Juárez Cartel and the Beltrán Leyva Organization. Over the years, Borderland Beat increased in readership and popularity, including with U.S. and Mexican law enforcement. As readers began to contribute in the articles' comments sections, Borderland Beat created a forum for users to share drug cartel news and updates. Borderland Beat has reporters and informants based in Mexico who provided "boots on the ground" for many of the news articles published by the blog. Several of them were based in various geographical locations, which facilitated information gathering on distinct drug cartels that operated in these respective areas.

In the 2010s, Borderland Beat started collaborating with journalists and crime reporters based in Mexico to give them a safer platform to share organized crime news. In Mexico, journalists avoid writing about drug cartel violence because they fear retribution from organized crime groups. Borderland Beat provided an anonymous platform to publish articles that they could not report on in the mainstream Mexican media. Borderland Beat never had a physical office where drug cartels could carry out an attack, another factor that made it an attractive platform for crime reporters. In March 2010, Borderland Beat wrote an article titled "War on Information in Mexico", which covered violence against journalists and the rise of social media as a platform for news sharing. The following year, Borderland Beat published an article titled "Mexican Drug Cartel Kills Blogger" that highlighted the growing dangers of citizen journalists in Mexico's ongoing drug war. As bloggers started becoming a target by organized crime groups in Mexico, several international media outlets interviewed some of the BB reporters to share their experiences. The Daily Dot and MSNBC interviewed former Borderland Beat reporter "Overmex" and Der Spiegel interviewed "Gerardo".

In 2011, Buggs decided to reveal his identity to confront the logistics of maintaining Borderland Beat and to help spread Borderland Beat's popularity. Buggs argued that by revealing his identity, this move would help media outlets identify the point of contact within Borderland Beat and avoid pursuing other reporters and try to uncover their identities. In November of that year, Buggs did his first interview with the Texas-based news outlet KRGV News. During the interview, Buggs discussed Borderland Beat's mission and violence against reporters. "[Borderland Beat] was intended to fill a voice that the media wasn't reporting,” Buggs said. "A lot of the narco cartels were targeting the media."

Borderland Beat was the first media outlet to confirm the May 2020 death of Sinaloa Cartel drug lord José Rodrigo Aréchiga Gamboa ("El Chino Ántrax"), who had been in supervised released at his home in San Diego, California, but escaped to his hometown of Culiacán, Sinaloa. Borderland Beat broke the story after one of their sources confirmed to them that Chino Ántrax was killed in a shootout in Culiacán along with his sister Ada Jimena Aréchiga Gamboa and brother-in-law Juan Garcia Espinoza. In November 2022, Borderland Beat was the first media outlet to report that drug trafficker Edgar Valdez-Villarreal "La Barbie" was no longer in Bureau of Prisons custody. Mexican President Andrés Manuel López Obrador referenced Borderland Beat's story, stating in a press conference that he believed Borderland Beat received the information in a leak.

== Lawsuit ==
In October 2020, Borderland Beat announced that they were shutting down their website in response to a lawsuit issued against them by a Mexican drug lord. The drug lord in question was Armando Valencia Cornelio, former leader of the Milenio Cartel, who sued Borderland Beat through the United States District Court for the Northern District of California for publishing a story about him that included personal information. Borderland Beat reporter "MX" published an article in June 2020 giving an overview of his criminal career and release from U.S. prison earlier that year. The article stated that Valencia Cornelio was moving to Atherton, California, and had lymphoma cancer. The story was originally published by the Mexican newspaper Reforma and translated and republished by Borderland Beat. Multiple other media outlets in Mexico also circulated the story and were eventually included in Valencia Cornelio's lawsuit. (Note: These were the following parties who were sued along with Borderland Beat: Blogger, Google, El Siglo de Torreón, Noventa Grados, Codigo Rojo Noticias; Infobae, El Manana, Reporte Nivel Uno, Omnia, Valor Tamaulipeco, Reforma, El Norte, Noticias PV Nayarit, Vanguardia and Roes 1-50.)

In efforts to conceal his identity, Valencia Cornelio was granted a "John Doe" plaintiff identity after his attorney Jeffrey Mendelman filed a motion. In the lawsuit, Valencia Cornelio's defense complained that Borderland Beat violated Blogger's privacy policy by publishing personal information about him. The BB report included an old California driver's license (CDL) that Valencia Cornelio once owned. That CDL included the "...driver’s license number, address, sex, height, weight, date of birth and signature of [Valencia Cornelio]." The CDL was originally published by the Mexican newspaper El Norte in 2003, the year Valencia Cornelio was arrested in Mexico. Borderland Beat closed down their main website but said that they would continue their efforts on a smaller scale through their Twitter account. They said they were hoping to relaunch in January 2021. Borderland Beat relaunched in January 2021 as projected. They reiterated their commitment to reporting on Mexican drug cartels, and said they would keep their readers informed on the progression of the lawsuit.

Borderland Beat has since resumed reporting and their website is back online.

== Impact and reputation ==
Borderland Beat is frequently cited by major news outlets in the United States and Mexico, as well as by academic articles. In 2012, government contractor General Dynamics won an 11,319,000 dollar contract from the Department of Homeland Security (DHS) to monitor several media sites reporting on security in Mexico, including Borderland Beat. In 2020, International Crisis Group published a report counting the number of criminal groups in Mexico over time based on Borderland Beat's coverage of Mexican security events. Leaked and declassified law enforcement reports show that United States agencies frequently use Borderland Beat as a source.

In 2020, the San Diego Reader called Borderland Beat "one of the best resources for current and accurate information on Mexico’s bloody drug wars".

Between December 2009 and June 2022, Borderland Beat has had 243,705,858 page visits. It averages approximately 50,000 readers a day. Borderland Beat also had a Facebook account with 100,000 followers, but this page was closed in February 2020 for reportedly "violating community standards". Borderland Beat responded by claiming that they rarely uploaded gore videos and that those that they did were usually covered by Facebook with a warning notice. "The staff on Facebook reviewed the page and they felt the whole page violated the community standards and chose to just delete the whole page permanently. I find this move might have an ulterior motive", Borderland Beat said in a statement.

== Bibliography ==
- Marentes, Alex (2019). Borderland Beat: Reporting On the Mexican Cartel Drug War. Lulu. ISBN 978-1686892448.
