= Rogelio González Pizaña =

Mexican mob boss (1974–2015)

- Born: 1 March 1974; Mexico
- Died: 6 December 2015 (aged 41); Matamoros, Tamaulipas, Mexico
- Other names: L-20; Z-2; El Kelín
- Occupation: Los Zetas leader
- Predecessor: Arturo Guzmán Decena
- Successor: Heriberto Lazcano Lazcano

Rogelio González Pizaña (1 March 1974 – 6 December 2015), commonly referred to by his alias Z-2 and/or El Kelín, was a Mexican former drug lord and one of the founders of Los Zetas, a criminal organization originally formed by ex-commandos from the Mexican Armed Forces. Unlike the rest of the founders of Los Zetas, however, he did not serve in the Mexican Armed Forces before joining the drug trade.

== Criminal career ==
Rogelio González Pizaña, also known as Z-2 or El Kelin, was born in Mexico on 1 March 1974. In the late 1990s, the Gulf Cartel leader Osiel Cárdenas Guillén, fearing his rivals, decided to form an elite armed squadron to protect him. The group, which became known as Los Zetas, was mostly composed of former members of the Mexican Armed Forces. Some of the members, including their founder Arturo Guzmán Decena (alias "Z1"), deserted from the Mexican Special Forces Grupo Aeromóvil de Fuerzas Especiales (GAFE) to work for the drug lord. González Pizaña was the second-in-command of Los Zetas, just behind Guzmán Decena. The third-in-command was Heriberto Lazcano Lazcano (alias "Z3"). Los Zetas, under the command of the three men, led covert operations in northern Mexico to decimate rival drug cartel members and to consolidate the Gulf Cartel as the leading criminal organization on the Gulf of Mexico.

== Kingpin Act sanction ==
On 24 March 2010, the United States Department of the Treasury sanctioned González Pizaña under the Foreign Narcotics Kingpin Designation Act (sometimes referred to simply as the "Kingpin Act"), for his involvement in drug trafficking along with fifty-three other international criminals and ten foreign entities. The act prohibited U.S. citizens and companies from doing any kind of business activity with him, and virtually froze all his assets in the U.S.

== Arrest and sentence ==
He was arrested by federal agents and members of the now-extinct Policía Federal Preventiva (PFP) in Matamoros, Tamaulipas on 29 October 2004. He was sentenced to 16 years in prison on 21 January 2014.

== Release ==
On 30 August 2014, González Pizaña was released from prison. This occurred because a court in Guadalajara, Jalisco decided to change his original 16-year sentence given by a court in Toluca, State of Mexico with a new one. The new sentence was of 6 years and 3 days in prison (prison time he had already served since his arrest). Despite his release, the DEA still maintains an open investigation on González Pizaña for his involvement in drug trafficking and for threatening two U.S. federal agents in Matamoros in 1999.

== Death ==
On 6 December 2015, González Pizaña was killed along with his family in Matamoros by suspected members of the Gulf Cartel.

== See also ==
- Mexican drug war
