= Gustavo González Castro =

Mexican mob boss (born 1973)

- Born: 1 July 1973 (age 52); Tuxpan, Veracruz
- Other names: El Erótico (The Erotic One)
- Organization(s): Mexican Army (1990–1999); Gulf Cartel (1999–2010); Los Zetas (1999–present)
- Criminal status: Fugitive

Gustavo González Castro (born 1 July 1973), commonly referred to by his alias "El Erótico" ("The Erotic One"), is a suspected Mexican drug lord and founding member of Los Zetas, a criminal organization originally formed by ex-commandos from the Mexican Armed Forces. He joined the Mexican Army as an infantry soldier in 1990, and ascended to the corporal unit five years later. By 1999, however, González Castro had resigned and began working for the Gulf Cartel and Los Zetas along with several former military men.

Considered one of the prolific assassins in his organization, González Castro commanded and successfully carried out a massive prison break of 25 inmates with other Army deserters in 2004. González Castro is among Mexico's most-wanted men, and one of the last standing founders of Los Zetas, along with Omar Lorméndez Pitalúa.

== Criminal career ==
Gustavo González Castro was born in the Mexican city of Tuxpan, Veracruz on 1 July 1973. He joined the Mexican Air Force, a service branch of the Mexican Army, on 22 March 1990 as an infantry soldier. In 1995, he was the corporal unit, but resigned to enlist in the reserves on 1 August 1999. At some point after leaving the Armed Forces, González Castro joined the criminal organization known as Los Zetas, which was formed by him and other ex-soldiers who were recruited by the Gulf Cartel under the tutelage of the then-leader Osiel Cárdenas Guillén in the late 1990s.

In the early 2000s, Carlos Rosales Mendoza, the leader of La Familia drug cartel and close associate of Cárdenas Guillén, was combating the Milenio Cartel for the control of the drug trafficking territories in the state of Michoacán. In an attempt to put down the Milenio organization, Rosales Mendoza contacted the Gulf Cartel and asked them to send several gunmen of Los Zetas to help in the fight. Cárdenas Guillén agreed by sending Efraín Teodoro Torres and González Castro, two of its best hitmen. On 4 January 2004, the Gulf Cartel dispatched several members of Los Zetas, including González Castro, to perpetrate a larger prison escape in a municipal prison in Apatzingán, a city just 200 miles from the nation's capital. Armed with AK-47s and AR-15s and dressed in military uniform, the Zeta gunmen tied up the prison guards and liberated at least 25 inmates, including five high-ranking members of the Gulf Cartel. The Mexican authorities believe that the imprisoned Cárdenas Guillén had possibly ordered this raid in an attempt to predict the likelihood of his escape from La Palma prison. (Note: Osiel Cárdenas Guillén was arrested on 14 March 2003 in the border city of Matamoros, Tamaulipas after an intense shootout between Gulf Cartel gunmen and the Mexican Armed Forces. While awaiting extradition, he was imprisoned at Federal Social Readaptation Center No. 1 ("La Palma"), but there are signs that he reportedly controlled drug trafficking operations behind bars. Cárdenas Guillén was later extradited to the U.S. in 2007 and sentenced to 25 years in prison in 2010.)

=== Status ===
In late January 2009, several homicides were reported in Guadalajara area, including the discovery of the alleged body of González Castro, alias El Erótico. The information was not confirmed, and González Castro remains a fugitive and in Mexico's most-wanted list. He is also one of the last standing founders of Los Zetas who are still at large.

In 2011 and 2012, González Castro was reported to have been commanding Los Zetas in Monterrey and Tamaulipas state respectively.

== Kingpin Act sanction ==
On 24 March 2010, the United States Department of the Treasury sanctioned González Castro under the Foreign Narcotics Kingpin Designation Act (sometimes referred to simply as the "Kingpin Act"), for his involvement in drug trafficking along with fifty-three other international criminals and ten foreign entities. The act prohibited U.S. citizens and companies from doing any kind of business activity with him, and virtually froze all his assets in the U.S.

== See also ==
- Mexican drug war

== Sources ==
=== Bibliography ===
- U.S. Congress (2007). State, foreign operations, and related programs appropriations for 2008. United States Government Printing Office.
- Grayson, George W. (2010). Mexico: Narco-Violence and a Failed State?. Transaction Publishers. p. 291. ISBN 978-1412811514.
- Grayson, George W. (2012). La Familia Drug Cartel: Implications for U.S.-Mexican Security (PDF). Strategic Studies Institute. ISBN 978-1478113164. Archived from the original (PDF) on May 11, 2011.
