= Héctor Félix Miranda =

Mexican journalist (1941–1988)

- Born: c. 1941; Choix, Sinaloa, Mexico
- Died: April 20, 1988 (aged 46–47); Tijuana, Baja California, Mexico
- Occupation: journalist
- Organization: Zeta
- Known for: columns, 1988 murder

Héctor Félix Miranda (c. 1941 – April 20, 1988) was a Mexican journalist and columnist for the Tijuana-based Zeta magazine, which reported on corruption and drug trafficking. In the late 1970s, he began to work for the daily newspaper ABC under Jesús Blancornelas and wrote under the name "Félix el Gato" ("Felix the Cat") to criticize local politicians. These columns eventually angered Baja California's state government and Mexico's former President José López Portillo to the point that the government ordered Blancornelas to fire Félix and banned its distribution. When Blancornelas refused, a SWAT team was sent to take over the paper's offices on the pretext of settling a labor dispute.

In 1980, Blancornelas and Félix co-founded the weekly magazine Zeta. Through the magazine, the pair continued their investigation into organized crime and corruption. Félix contributed a column titled "A Little of Something", in which he satirized and criticized government officials, particularly those of the long-ruling Institutional Revolutionary Party (PRI). He particularly targeted Jorge Hank Rhon, son of a former Mexico City mayor and the owner of a Tijuana racetrack.

Félix was assassinated on April 20, 1988, when a car cut in front of him in traffic; another vehicle pulled alongside, and Félix was hit with multiple shotgun blasts. Two guards from Hank Rhon's racetrack were later convicted of the murder. In protest of the killing, as well as those of 28 other journalists since the election of President Miguel de la Madrid, a national journalism organization boycotted a Press Freedom Day ceremony at which la Madrid had been slated to speak.

As of 2004, Blancornelas left Félix's name on the Zeta masthead, marked with a black cross. He also published a full-page ad in every issue under Félix's "byline", asking Hank Rhon why Félix had been murdered.

== Assassination ==
Félix Miranda's sassy, humorous, and provocative writing style on issues covering corruption and drug trafficking earned him a lot of popularity among many readers in Tijuana, but many of those involved in the drug trade disliked him. While he was traveling to work on April 20, 1988, Félix Miranda was shot and killed by a gunman. After his death, Jesús Blancornelas published articles from his newspaper with Félix Miranda's name as the copublisher – as if he were alive. Blancornelas accused Jorge Hank Rhon, a prominent businessman in Tijuana, of ordering the assassination of his co-worker. By 1997, two of Rhon's body guards were arrested and serving prison time for the crime, but the Mexican authorities never confirmed who had ordered the execution. In court, the bodyguards professed their innocence and said that they were "tortured into confessing." After several years, the investigation was closed, but suspicions remain about whether the investigation of the case was all-inclusive and about the involvement of Hank Rhon and other politicians in Baja California.

Félix Miranda was known in Mexico for his humorous reporting tone that satirized the corrupt doings of local and state officials in his column. Among his favorite targets was Hank Rhon, the famous race track owner and son of the former Agriculture Secretary of the state, Carlos Hank González. The journalist once published in one of his columns that Rhon had laundered money at his Agua Caliente Racetrack.

Blancornelas, Félix Miranda's writing partner, continued his aggressive writing style and published more articles on the Tijuana Cartel and the drug trade than many other Mexican newspapers. In response to the death of his colleague, Blancornelas issued an ad pressuring the Baja California that read the following, "Jorge Hank Rhon: Why did your bodyguards assassinate me?" in reference to the death of Félix Miranda.

Over the years, Blancornelas received numerous death threats, a murder attempt, and international press rewards for his work.

== Aftermath ==
On April 30 and May 1, 2015, Victoriano Medina Moreno and Antonio Vera Palestina, the two assassins, were released from prison after fulfilling their 27-year sentence. Both were security guards at the Agua Caliente Racetrack, owned by Hank Rhon. Félix Miranda wrote articles about the alleged irregularities that took place in the racing circuit. The Zeta directorship condemned the fact that state authorities have closed the case and not identified the mastermind of Félix Miranda's murder.

== See also ==
- Francisco Ortiz Franco
- List of journalists killed in Mexico

== Bibliography ==
- Fox, Elizabeth (2002). [Latin Politics, Global Media] (1st ed.). University of Texas Press. ISBN 029272537X.
- Collings, Anthony (2001). [Words of Fire: Independent Journalists who Challenge Dictators, Drug Lords, and Other Enemies of a Free Press] (1st ed.). NYU Press. ISBN 0814716059.
- Lutz, Ellen L. (1990). Human Rights in México: A Policy of Impunity] (1st ed.). Human Rights Watch. ISBN 0929692624.
- Weinberg, Bill (2002). [Homage to Chiapas: The New Indigenous Struggles in Mexico] (1st ed.). Verso Books. ISBN 1859843727.
- Washington Valdez, Diana (2006). The Killing Fields: Harvest of Women] (1st ed.). Peace Hill Press. ISBN 0615140084.
