= Tijuana Innovadora =

Civic festival and organization in Tijuana, Mexico

- Formation: 2010
- Founders: José Galicot, Alejandro Bustamante Gutiérrez, Tomás Perrín Escobar
- Type: Civic association
- Headquarters: Tijuana, Baja California, Mexico
- President: José Galicot

Tijuana Innovadora ("Innovative Tijuana") is a civic initiative based in Tijuana, Baja California, Mexico. It began in October 2010 as a two-week festival meant to improve the city's image during the Mexican drug war by showcasing its industry and culture, and drew speakers including President Felipe Calderón, Al Gore, Carlos Slim and Jimmy Wales. Further festivals followed in 2012, 2014, 2016 and 2020, and the organization now runs year-round programs in art, education, the environment and violence prevention.

== Origins ==
The project grew out of an effort by the Tijuana businessman José Galicot. After a heart attack in January 2009, he had surgery in San Diego and learned that his pacemaker had been made in Tijuana, as were many other medical devices. He set out to make the city's manufacturing role better known, giving some 200 talks over the following year. He founded Tijuana Innovadora with Alejandro Bustamante Gutiérrez and Tomás Perrín Escobar, and has credited his daughter Jaye with much of the original idea and with recruiting speakers for the first two festivals.

== Festivals ==
=== 2010 ===
The first festival opened in October 2010 and ran for two weeks, at a cost of about US$5 million. Calderón attended the opening, and speakers included Gore, Slim, the astronaut José Hernández, Chris Anderson of Wired, Wales and the Twitter co-founder Biz Stone. Before the event, Galicot asked local newspaper editors to run only positive stories on their front pages for two weeks.

=== Later editions ===
The third festival, held from 16 to 26 October 2014 at the Tijuana Cultural Center, took the Mexican diaspora in the United States as its theme. It offered more than 200 talks and 45 workshops, with speakers including the Tel Aviv mayor Ron Huldai, the U.S. Homeland Security official Alan Bersin, the politicians Josefina Vázquez Mota and Marcelo Ebrard, and the baseball pitcher Fernando Valenzuela. Sponsors were harder to find that year, and Galicot said it could be the last edition. Festivals were nonetheless held again in 2016 and in 2020, the tenth anniversary, under the theme of Tijuana's future. Over the years the festivals have hosted more than 500 speakers, among them the Nobel laureate Mario Molina, Anand Mahindra, Steve Wozniak and Alfonso Cuarón.

== Programs ==
Tijuana Innovadora later became a year-round civic association. Its programs include:

- Casa de las Ideas, arts and education workshops for children and young people intended to prevent violence
- Arte en la Industria, which takes art exhibitions into factories, schools and community spaces
- a youth symphony orchestra
- Tijuana Verde, an environmental program
- InnovaModa, for young fashion designers
- a youth leadership program
- Comunidad Creativa, for local creative workers
- a fab lab
- the Paseo de la Fama, Tijuana's walk of fame, which each year honors people from Baja California

According to La Prensa San Diego, at least six Mexican cities, including Culiacán, Ciudad Juárez, Irapuato and Cuernavaca, have partly copied the model.
