= Arturo Guzmán Decena =

Mexican Army Special Forces officer; founder of the Los Zetas cartel

- Arturo Guzmán Decena when he was in the Federal Judicial Police (P.J.F.)
- Born: 13 January 1976; Puebla, Mexico
- Died: 21 November 2002 (aged 26); Matamoros, Tamaulipas, Mexico
- Cause of death: Gunshot wounds
- Other name: Z-1
- Occupations: Former soldier; drug trafficker
- Known for: Founding and leading Los Zetas
- Successor: Rogelio González Pizaña
- Military career
- Allegiance: Mexico
- Branch: Mexican Army
- Service years: 1992–1997
- Rank: Lieutenant
- Unit: Grupo Aeromóvil de Fuerzas Especiales
- Conflicts: Chiapas conflict

Arturo Guzmán Decena (13 January 1976 – 21 November 2002), also known by his code name Z-1, was a Mexican Army Special Forces officer and high-ranking member of Los Zetas, a criminal group based in Tamaulipas. He defected from the military in 1997 and formed Los Zetas, the Gulf Cartel's former paramilitary wing, under the leadership of the kingpin Osiel Cárdenas Guillén.

Guzmán Decena was born in a poor family in Puebla and joined the military as a teenager to escape from poverty. While in the military, he was a talented and bright soldier, earning a position in the Special Forces of the Mexican military by the mid-1990s. During his military career, Guzmán Decena received counter-insurgency training, acquired skills in explosives, and learned how to track down and apprehend his enemies from an elite combat group trained by the U.S. Special Forces and the Israel Defense Forces.

He began to take bribes from the Gulf Cartel while still serving in the military, but eventually defected to work full-time for the criminal organization in 1997. For years he recruited other members of the Mexican Armed Forces to form Los Zetas.

He served as the right-hand man of Cárdenas Guillén until 21 November 2002, when he was gunned down and killed by the Mexican Army Special Forces in the border city of Matamoros, Tamaulipas.

== Biography ==
=== Career and military defection ===
Guzmán Decena was born in a poor village in Puebla, Mexico on 13 January 1976, and finished middle school and high school before joining the Mexican military to escape poverty. His talents and aggressive behavior earned him a position with an elite Mexican military group called Grupo Aeromóvil de Fuerzas Especiales (GAFE), originally trained in counter-insurgency tactics for the Zapatista uprising in 1994 and for locating and apprehending members of Mexico's drug trafficking organizations. Guzmán Decena reportedly received military training from the Israeli special forces. His training came into practice after more than 3,000 Zapatista rebels seized several towns across the southern state of Chiapas in 1994. The rebellion was a symbolic rising against poverty and the single-party rule of the Institutional Revolutionary Party (PRI), and many rebels took arms; the Mexican government, however, sent in the GAFE to put down the Zapatistas. Within hours, 34 rebels were killed and three others were captured by Guzmán Decena's counter-insurgency group. Their bodies were then disposed on a riverbank – with their ears and noses sliced off.

Now one of the brightest, highly trained, and bloodiest members in the GAFE, Guzmán Decena was sent to the northern state of Tamaulipas. While operating as the security chief in the city of Miguel Alemán, Tamaulipas, he was recruited by Cárdenas Guillén's cartel. Investigators say that Guzmán Decena first worked with the Gulf Cartel by taking bribes from Osiel Cárdenas Guillén and turning a blind eye on the drug shipments of the cartel. Such payments were typical among military commanders, but while soldiers had often accepted bribes from the drug lords, it was not common for them to defect from the army and join their ranks. Bribes were seen by soldiers as "benefits" to their job, and officers stood firm to the idea that they were protectors of the Mexican people. Guzmán Decena, however, shattered that model and left the military in 1997 to work full-time with a drug trafficking organization. According to the British journalist, Ioan Grillo, it is still unclear why Guzmán Decena defected from the army to become a "narco-mercenary." A common explanation is that Guzmán Decena left the military in search of a higher payment, seeing that many cartel members lived ostentatiously and earned more in a year than a GAFE member earned in a lifetime. Nonetheless, he would have also lived comfortably as a successful GAFE member in the army. And by joining the Gulf cartel, he was becoming a fugitive and increasing his chances of being arrested or killed. Hence, a crucial factor in his defection may have been the seismic change of Mexico's transition to democracy and the tearing rule of the PRI. The "new Mexico" and the democracy that came with it was feared by many soldiers who had made abuses during the old regime. Mounting pressures arose from the families of the "disappeared" who made marches in Mexico City, and many military officers were found guilty in courts-martial for human right abuses and corruption. For years, some military generals took bribes from the cartels; amid the turmoil, Guzmán Decena acknowledged that he was better off outside the system and as a leader of Los Zetas.

Cárdenas Guillén then asked Guzmán Decena to help him recruit and set up the most ferocious hit squad possible for his cartel. Mexican federal agents later released the conversation between the two after an informant passed on the information of the new unit:

Cárdenas Guillén – "I want the best men. The best."

Guzmán Decena – "What type of people do you need?"
Cárdenas Guillén – "The best armed men that there are."
Guzmán Decena – "These are only in the army."

Cárdenas Guillén – "I want them."

Following the orders, Guzmán Decena recruited dozens of soldiers from the Mexican military. Some media outlets report that the formation of Los Zetas was the result of a "mass defection" of a single army unit. But military records show that this claim is false and inaccurate. Soldiers left their ranks and joined Los Zetas over some months and were from a number of different military units, but a number of GAFE soldiers made up a large part of the deserters. The members were given a codename with the letter Z, starting with Guzmán Decena with Z-1. Within some months, Guzmán Decena commanded a mercenary army of 38 defected soldiers enticed by salaries substantially higher than those paid by the Mexican government. The GAFE soldiers that went to work with the Gulf cartel took with them a number of the Mexican Army's most sophisticated machine guns, assault rifles, pistols, bazookas, grenades, and telecommunications and surveillance equipment. The role of Los Zetas was soon expanded by "collecting debts, securing cocaine supply and trafficking routes known as 'plazas,' and executing its foes – often with grotesque savagery."

=== Gómez Herrera's execution ===
Once Juan García Ábrego, the founder of the Gulf cartel, was imprisoned in 1996, Ángel Salvador Gómez Herrera (a.k.a. El Chava) sought to take over the assets of the criminal organization along with Cárdenas Guillén. At first, both of them functioned well together: they bought off police officers, bribed politicians and soldiers, and managed to take control of major drug shipments coming in from Guatemala. Although supposedly Cárdenas Guillén's equal, Gómez Herrera's manipulative personality annoyed Guillén, especially after Herrera's constant requests for money loans. Such behavior offended Cárdenas Guillén, who assembled his own faction within the Gulf Cartel. But in mid-1999, Osiel Cárdenas Guillén, after his daughter's baptism ceremony, ordered Guzmán Decena to execute Gómez Herrera, the godfather of Cárdenas Guillén's baby. Gómez Herrera was cordially invited to ride in Cárdenas Guillén's Dodge Durango after the ceremony. They exchanged laughs and talked for a few minutes. Guzmán Decena, who was riding in the back seat of the truck, fired a bullet into Gómez Herrera's head. Investigators later found Herrera's decaying dead body at the outskirts of the city of Matamoros, Tamaulipas. For killing Gómez Herrera, Cárdenas Guillén earned his nickname, the Mata Amigos ("Friend Killer"), and Guzmán Decena, the trust of his boss.

=== Death ===
Guzmán Decena was shot dead by Mexican soldiers inside a restaurant on 22 November 2002 in Matamoros, Tamaulipas after being spotted by the Mexican military. Another account written by Jesús Blancornelas indicates that Guzmán Decena went to a restaurant, had a few strong drinks, snorted a line of cocaine, and then decided to visit his mistress Ana Bertha González Lagunes, who lived a few blocks away. In order to not be interrupted, Guzmán Decena reportedly ordered his henchmen to block the street and direct traffic. Nonetheless, one of the neighbors called an anti-organized crime agency which called on the Mexican Army. When the soldiers arrived, Guzmán Decena was unable to defend himself and was shot to death.

After his death, flowers in his honor were placed on the sidewalk outside the restaurant and at his gravesite. According to the photos published by the local newspapers in Matamoros, a note accompanied the flowers and read the following:

"You will always be in our hearts. From your family, Los Zetas."

Similarly, memorials were placed in the state of Oaxaca to venerate Guzmán Decena.

In an apparent revenge for Guzmán Decena's assassination, four members of the Office of the General Prosecutor were abducted and murdered near Reynosa, Tamaulipas in early 2003, allegedly by Cárdenas Guillén's men. Less than four months after Guzmán Decena's death, the Mexican military captured the Gulf cartel's kingpin, Osiel Cárdenas Guillén, on 14 March 2003. The second-in-command in Los Zetas, Rogelio González Pizaña (a.k.a.: Z2), was captured in October 2004 and so Heriberto Lazcano Lazcano (a.k.a.: Z3) ascended to the leadership of the paramilitary gang, and who will become the infamous ruthless leader of the, now independent, Zetas Drug Cartel.

The death of Guzmán Decena marked the first significant success of the Mexican government against Los Zetas, but unconfirmed reports from within the organization claim that Guzmán Decena was killed by "his own men" on orders by Cárdenas Guillén, who feared Guzmán Decena's hegemony.

== See also ==
- Mexican drug war

== Bibliography ==
- Grillo, Ioan (2012). El Narco: The Bloody Rise of Mexican Drug Cartels (2nd ed.). Bloomsbury Publishing. ISBN 978-1408824337.
- Grayson, George W. (2012). The Executioner's Men: Los Zetas, Rogue Soldiers, Criminal Entrepreneurs, and the Shadow State They Created (1st ed.). Transaction Publishers. ISBN 9781412846172.
- Serrano, Mónica (2012). Mexican Security Failure. Routledge. ISBN 978-0415893275.
