= El Narco: Inside Mexico's Criminal Insurgency =

2011 non-fiction book of the Mexican drug war written by Ioan Grillo

- Front cover
- Author: Ioan Grillo
- Language: English; Spanish
- Subject: Mexican drug war
- Genre: non-fiction
- Publisher: Bloomsbury Press
- Publication date: October 25, 2011
- Pages: 336
- ISBN: 1608192113

El Narco: Inside Mexico's Criminal Insurgency is a non-fiction book of the Mexican drug war written by Ioan Grillo. In El Narco, Grillo takes a close look at the Mexican illegal drug trade, starting with the term "El Narco", which has come to represent the vast, faceless criminal network of drug traffickers who cast a murderous shadow over Mexico. The book covers the frontline of the Mexican drug war. It seeks to trace the origins of the illegal drug trade in Mexico, the recent escalation of violence, the human cost of the drug trade and organized crime in the country. The book takes a critical stance on the unsuccessful efforts made by the Mexican government and the United States to confront the violence and its causes.

Grillo's book draws a portrait of the Mexican drug cartels and how they have radically transformed in the past couple of decades. For the author, the criminal organizations in Mexico are not gangs; they are a "movement and an industry drawing in hundreds of thousands from bullet-ridden barrios to marijuana-growing mountains". The book explains how the cartels have created paramilitary death squads with tens of thousands of armed men from the country of Guatemala to the Texan border. It contains testimonies from members inside of the cartels; and while El Narco shows that the "devastation" of the Mexican drug war may be south of the U.S. border, Grillo pinpoints that the United States "is knee-deep in this conflict".

In the British edition, published in September 2011, the book bore the subtitle, "The Bloody Rise of Mexican Drug Cartels". The US edition came out two months later, bearing a different subtitle. A Spanish-language version of the book titled "El narco: En el corazón de la insurgencia criminal mexicana" has also been released.

== Author's background ==
Ioan Grillo is an English journalist and author of the book El Narco: Inside Mexico's Criminal Insurgency. He has been reporting on the Mexican drug war and the Latin American illegal drug trade since 2001. He is a producer of TV special reports and documentaries for stations including PBS and Channel 4 of the United Kingdom. Grillo has also worked as a reporter for CNN, the Houston Chronicle, and Sunday Telegraph, where he has witnessed military operations, mafia killings, and drug seizures in his work. He has reported on Al Jazeera, France 24, The Sunday Times, Gatopardo, and the San Francisco Chronicle. He currently lives in Mexico City.

According to the biography section in his official webpage, Grillo grew up in the coastal city of Brighton, England. According to the author, few people there realize where the drugs they are taking come from or what they might give or takeaway from those countries. Moreover, Grillo began working as a drug war journalist after being fascinated "by the riddle of these ghost-like figures" who make more than $30 billion a year and are idolized in popular songs known as narcocorridos and chased by the Mexican and U.S. authorities. For over a decade, Grillo has followed the end-less murder scenes in "bullet-ridden streets, mountains where drugs are born as pretty flowers, and scarred criminals from prison cells to luxury condos". Grillo has discussed the drug war with two Mexican presidents, three attorneys general and a U.S. ambassador, among others.

== Book's excerpts ==
Excerpt 1

The following excerpt from the book is set in Culiacán, the capital city of Sinaloa, the northwestern state that is home to the Sinaloa Cartel and is known as the "cradle of Mexican drug smuggling":

Twenty seconds of shooting. Four hundred and thirty-two bullets. Five dead policemen.

Four of the corpses sprawl over a shiny-new Dodge Ram pickup truck that has been pierced by so many caps it resembles a cheese grater. The cadavers are twisted and contorted in the unnatural poses of the dead; arms arch backward over spines, legs spread out sideways; the pattern of bodies that fall like rag dolls when bullets strike.

After arriving at too many murder scenes, I often felt numb staring at the lead-filled flesh spread out on the concrete, dirt roads and car seats. The images all blur into one. But then little details come back: the twists of elbows over backs, heads over shoulders. It is these patterns that come into my mind when I think about the murder scenes; and these patterns then filter into bad dreams when I am sleeping in a bed a thousand miles away.

This particular crime scene is on a sweaty December evening in Culiacán, Sinaloa. The state policemen had hit a red stop light next to a shopping center when the triggermen attacked. BANG. BANG. BANG. The assassins shoot from the side and back unleashing bullets in split seconds. A customized Kalashnikov with a circular clip can unload 100 rounds in 10 seconds. This is lightning war. People tend to shudder at the fact that Mexican gangsters have rocket-propelled grenades. But the AK-47 is far more lethal."

Excerpt 2

Below is an excerpt from Time magazine published on October 23, 2011. It is the confession of a cartel member that is imprisoned:

It all seemed like a bad dream.

It may have been vivid and raw. But it felt somehow surreal, like Gonzalo was watching these terrible acts from above. Like it was someone else who had firefights with ski-masked federal police in broad daylight. Someone else who stormed into homes and dragged away men from crying wives and mothers. Someone else who duct-taped victims to chairs and starved and beat them for days. Someone else who clasped a machete and began to hack off their craniums while they were still living. But it was all real.

He was a different man when he did those things, Gonzalo tells me. He had smoked crack cocaine and drunk whisky every day, had enjoyed power in a country where the poor are so powerless, had a latest model truck and could pay for houses in cash, had four wives and children scattered all over ... had no God. "In those days, I had no fear. I felt nothing. I had no compassion for anybody," he says, speaking slowly, swallowing some words.

Excerpt 3

The Global Post published a portion of the book where Grillo interviews an American agent who infiltrates a drug cartel:

Alongside other veterans, Daniel would buzz around the state in a helicopter carrying an M16 automatic rifle and raiding marijuana plantations. Most were run by Mexicans and located inside national parks and forests and included some huge farms with up to twelve thousand plants. During one bust, some thugs from Michoacán fired at them with Kalashnikovs. "I was getting close to the plantation and they fired. We hit the ground first, kneeling down and we fired back, and they were gone. These people have balls, they are crazy." Daniel's next job was in the U.S. Customs Service busting runners as they came over the border. Because of the huge quantity of traffic at Tijuana-San Diego, agents can only toss a tiny percentage of vehicles. So the key for Daniel and other agents was to try to read people and smell who was dirty. Daniel found he had a special talent for spotting smugglers. "It is like a sense. I look at them and see if the person that is driving does not match the car or the car does not match the person. I get close up to their face and say, 'How are you doing?' And if you're carrying a bunch of money or drugs, I'm going to get all over your ass."

== Critical reception ==
According to Blogcritics, El Narco is a "tough, straightforward, kick-in-the-nuts reportage by a man who is determined to ignore all the ideological gibberish and see for himself what's really going on in Mexico". They noted that El Narco is also a "really ugly book full of really ugly facts related by a terse, insightful writer who knows how to shape a powerful and compelling story into a powerful and compelling argument". Moreover, The Boston Globe said that Grillo is one of those authors that "does not forget" the newspaper headlines in Mexico's drug war that often "feel unreal" and go "beyond comprehension". He is also an author who "takes the advantage" of his sources to provide insight for the drug war from "nearly every angle", from America's attempts to stifle drug trafficking to a nation's history and drug culture. His book, El Narco, is filled with "sort of unforgettable details" in which only a reporter who has been behind the Mexican drug war for years "would be privy". Dudley Althaus of the Houston Chronicle stated that Grillo "traces the beast's footprints with meticulous research" and with "courageous reporting on some of [Mexico's] meanest streets". In addition, William Booth of The Washington Post said that Grillo "goes much, much deeper" in reporting the "crazy death spiral of drug violence" in Mexico's drug war. But most importantly, Booth mentioned that El Narco "tells us how we got here". The Powell's Books bookstore chains commented that the book is a "propulsive account of the blood-soaked machinery of 'El Narco,' the shadowy complex of drug cartels, street gangs, and paramilitary death squads that have littered Mexican streets with bodies and AK-47 shells". Grillo also explains how the violence is traced back to the vacuum left by the demise of the Institutional Revolutionary Party's (PRI) single-party rule "but delicately balanced system of corruption, painting a grim portrait of the corrupt police, soldiers, and officials who, figuring they can't beat the crime, make a tidy fortune by joining it".

Tim Padgett of Time magazine noted that Grillo "explores that world as deeply as few journalists have dared"; nonetheless, Padgett said that the historical context of the book not only indicts "Mexican and Latin American politicos but U.S. policymakers as well". Publishers Weekly, while noting that the book was a "propulsive account of the blood-soaked machinery", concluded that Grillo pinpoints that "America's hard-line rhetoric has failed." The magazine stated that Grillo's book can be as "perceptive as his high-octane reportage". Kirkus Reviews noted that the book emphasizes the "chilling account of the murderous growth of Mexican drug cartels", and concluded that El Narco is a "valuable contribution to the literature of the Drug War". The weekly television show known as Dan Rather Reports, that airs on HDNet, noted that El Narco is "riveting, authoritative reporting from the front lines of the Mexican drug wars". It argued that the book shows how the Mexican drug war has "explosive potential consequences for every American, and Ioan Grillo's book shows you why". The West Australian said that El Narco is an essential reading for those wishing to understand "how a violent criminal insurgency can take root in an advanced country with a trillion-dollar economy". But, it said that the book is not "for the faint hearted". According to the newspaper, the book engulfs an account of the "rivers of blood in which its citizens are drowning", since Mexico's drug war "is a case study in the way brutal mafia capitalism has morphed into a criminal insurgency, the like of which is spreading 'like bushfire' in the Americas".

Reforma, a Mexican newspaper, said that Grillo used the "closest information possible to his object of work", which means that he ran through serious "threats" to get his work done. Due to Grillo's experience and professionalism, Reforma argues that El Narco is both "horrifying and useful". The San Antonio Express-News claims that the book "delivers the first authoritative and comprehensive examination" of the mafia killings in Mexico. The newspaper explains that Grillo's book can help readers "understand the homicidal madness just across the river". It concluded by comparing the book with a "big canvas" that traces the rise of the Mexican drug trafficking organizations from the quaint 19th-century origins. The New Yorker wrote a review for El Narco and noted that the reading was "terrific—full of vivid front-line reporting; diverse interviews; a sense of history; a touch of social science; clarifying statistics; and realistic reviews of what might be done to improve things, none of it easy". The magazine said it is an "essential reading". It argued that it is America's "weak control of automatic weapons" and its "supply [of] guns and money" that fuel the bloodshed in Mexico. The Globe Corner Bookstore said that El Narco "draws the first definitive portrait of Mexico's drug cartels and how they have radically transformed in the last decade". In addition, it mentioned that "the devastation may be south of the Rio Grande, but America is knee-deep in this conflict." The Independent noted that Grillo and his book have "achieved extraordinary access to gangsters and police (often the same people)". And, the author shows how the Mexican drug cartels originated in the western state of Sinaloa, where the conditions for growing opium poppy were ideal, in the late 19th century. The New York-based magazine known as the Bookforum said that several books have been written in Spanish about Mexico's drug war, but Grillo's book is perhaps the "first attempt in English for a popular audience". The magazine noted that Grillo has spent years traveling to Mexico's drug war hotspots: "Sinaloa, Michoacán, Ciudad Juárez—recording interviews with cops and narcos, visiting grave sites and murder scenes". Bookforum concludes that Grillo's book was an attempt to dig more and beyond the "reigning mythology of the Mexican drug war".

Mother Jones magazine mentioned that the book's "graphic and fast-paced history covers south-of-the-border trafficking from '60s-era shipments of Acapulco Gold to the decapitation-filled headlines wrought by the likes of kingpin (and alleged billionaire) Joaquín 'El Chapo' Guzmán and his rivals, the Zetas—special ops soldiers turned criminals". The progressive online magazine Salon reported that the drug war violence in Mexico "seldom makes the front page in the U.S." newspapers. Nonetheless, they stated that many American officials are "worried that the cartels are taking on aspects of an 'insurgency,' which could make them a threat to the Mexican government". The Salon noted that Grillo's book "lays out the history of drug smuggling in the region over the past 100 years or so, and then homes in on the rise of the Northern Mexican cartels during the 2000s". Sylvia Longmire, a drug war analyst and author of the book Cartel: The Coming Invasion of Mexico's Drug Wars, said that one rarely comes across a writer like Grillo "who really gets it". She said that Grillo also did an incredible job navigating Mexican politics and explaining the role of how the Institutional Revolutionary Party (PRI) "[negotiated] and [played] along with the cartels, and how the transition to real democracy in 2000 dramatically altered that delicate balance". She also mentioned that Grillo proposes that the start of the Mexican drug war did not start in 2006—a convenient historical marker because that is when Calderón took office, but rather in 2004 in Nuevo Laredo, where the Sinaloa cartel made incursions to fight off Los Zetas. Malcolm Beith, author of The Last Narco: Inside the Hunt for El Chapo, the World's Most Wanted Drug Lord, said that Grillo is the "most intrepid and knowledgeable foreign journalist covering the drug war in Mexico today", and in El Narco, the author provides us with more than just a glimpse of Mexico's criminal underworld and its history. According to Beith, Grillo grants the readers "access to the soul and mind of El Narco, as well as deftly explaining and providing new insight into this hemispheric war on drugs". Howard Campbell, professor in Anthropology at the University of Texas at El Paso and author of the book Drug War Zone: Frontline Dispatches from the Streets of El Paso and Juarez, said that Grillo "puts a human face on the violent tragedy caused by U.S. drug demand and Mexican cartel criminality", and strongly recommends El Narco, a "timely and troubling book".

CNNMéxico stated that Grillo has been in "more crime scenes than he can remember", and that his book includes "interviews with hitmen, members of the cartels, politicians and police officers, and people trapped in the crossfire". According to the Spanish-speaking newspaper, Grillo repeatedly comes back to an idea: "Wars start because people cannot feed their families. They start because people feel inferior, without rights, angry and frustrated. They want something bigger in their lives. And you only need a group people with moral depression to convince them that killing and dying spectacularly means glory. Islamic terrorist, kamikaze squads, street gangs, the cartels. They were all children at one time." Goodreads said that Grillo did an "incredible job" for his book, where he "synthesized traditional interviews, academic research, pop culture and WikiLeaks to create a powerful and alarming picture of the cartels of Mexico". He was also complimented for explaining the "root causes" that threaten Mexican society and "probably have potential to be a disruptive force across the American continent and perhaps globally". Borderland Beat noted that Grillo seems to be "tune with the realities on the ground in Mexico". In addition, it mentioned that the author takes the reader into the world of the "narcocorridos", the drug ballads celebrating the exploits of the drug traffickers; Grillo also explores the "Santa Muerte, the peculiarly Mexican church (or cult, depending on whom you ask), favored by the poor, the delinquent, and the dopers". The writer of the article in Borderland Beat mentioned that although Grillo believes that the Mexican drug cartels are closer to a "criminal insurgency", he cannot buy the appellation because the cartels do not have an ideology behind what they do, since their goal is making money.

=== Awards and nominations ===
- BBC News gave Grillo the "BBC Radio 4 Book of the Week" award for El Narco.
- The Guardian nominated the book for The Guardian First Book Award 2011.
- Los Angeles Times nominated El Narco as a finalist for their Book Prize in 2011.
