= Heriberto Lazcano Lazcano =

Mexican drug lord (1974-2012)

- Born: 25 December 1974; Apan, Hidalgo, Mexico
- Died: 7 October 2012 (aged 37); Progreso, Coahuila, Mexico
- Cause of death: Ballistic trauma
- Other names: El Lazca, El Verdugo, Z-3
- Occupation: Leader of Los Zetas
- Organization: Los Zetas
- Predecessor: Rogelio González Pizaña
- Successor: Miguel Treviño Morales
- Opponents: Gulf Cartel; Sinaloa Cartel
- Military career
- Allegiance: Mexico
- Branch: Mexican Army
- Service years: 1991–1998
- Unit: Grupo Aeromóvil de Fuerzas Especiales
- Conflicts: Chiapas conflict

Heriberto Lazcano Lazcano (25 December 1974 – 7 October 2012), commonly referred to by his aliases Z-3 and El Lazca, was a Mexican drug lord and the leader of Los Zetas drug cartel. He was one of the most-wanted Mexican drug lords.

Lazcano joined the Mexican Army at the age of 16, and later ascended to the Grupo Aeromóvil de Fuerzas Especiales (GAFE), the Mexican Army special forces. During his tenure in the Mexican Army, Lazcano reportedly received military training from the Israel Defense Forces and the United States Army, but eventually deserted in 1998, after seven years of service. Upon his desertion, he was recruited by the drug lord Osiel Cárdenas Guillén and Arturo Guzmán Decena with around 30 other soldiers to work as the enforcers of the Gulf Cartel, forming the paramilitary group known as Los Zetas. His torture methods earned him the nickname "El Verdugo" ('The Executioner'), particularly for killing his victims by feeding them to lions and tigers he kept in a ranch.

Lazcano died in a shootout with the Mexican Navy on 7 October 2012. After his death, his body was taken from the funeral home by an armed gang.

== Early life ==
Lazcano was born to a poor family on Christmas Day, December 1974, in Apan, Hidalgo, Mexico. (Note: However, there are other sources that state he was born in Acatlán, Hidalgo; Lazcano also has a birth certificate from the state of Veracruz.) He enlisted in the Mexican Army as an infantry soldier at age 16 and was later enrolled in the Grupo Aeromóvil de Fuerzas Especiales (GAFE), an elite special forces team dedicated to combating Guerrillas (like the EZLN) and drug-trafficking organizations. His first military mission took place during the presidency of Ernesto Zedillo, when he was sent along with other GAFE soldiers to put down the armed insurgency in Chiapas. After that, he was moved to northern Mexico as part of a security reinforcement program against the drug trafficking organizations. While serving in the Mexican Army, Lazcano reportedly received training from the Israel Defense Forces and the United States Army. He acquired training in areas of counter-insurgency and counter-terrorism tactics; sniper techniques; jungle, mountain, desert, naval, and urban warfare; and learned how to use explosives, high-calibre rifles and grenade-launchers.

While traveling through Reynosa, Tamaulipas on 18 February 1998, Lazcano was detained by the Mexican authorities with 325 kilograms of marijuana in his vehicle (Chevrolet Silverado). During that time, Lazcano was still working as a judicial police officer in Tamaulipas but was also working for the drug lord Osiel Cárdenas Guillén. The federal document does not explain why he was allowed to leave after the narcotics were confiscated, but soon after this incident Lazcano left the military and his duty as a police reinforcement to work full-time for the Gulf Cartel.

== Organized crime ==
He served in the Army for seven years and eventually deserted on 27 March 1998, when he was recruited by Osiel Cárdenas Guillén and Arturo Guzmán Decena to form part of Los Zetas, originally set up by former soldiers of the Mexican Army working on the behalf of the Gulf Cartel. After Cárdenas Guillén was arrested and extradited to the United States in 2007, Los Zetas broke relations with the Gulf Cartel in 2010 and rose to become the strongest criminal organization in Mexico, alongside the Sinaloa Cartel. Lazcano was placed as third in command (Z-3), and after the death of Guzmán Decena (Z-1) in 2002 and the capture of Rogelio González Pizaña (Z-2) in 2004, he became the commander.

Under the tutelage of Lazcano, Los Zetas recruited more gunmen into their ranks, many of them former soldiers of the Mexican military and ex-Kaibiles, the Special Forces squadron of the Guatemalan military, former police officers, and street thugs. Lazcano also created regional cells that specialized in other crimes besides drug trafficking. Due to his military background, Lazcano instilled a "military culture" in his squadron, designating new recruits with the titles of "lieutenant" and "commander," and training them in military tactics.

By 2008, Lazcano forged an alliance with the brothers of the Beltrán Leyva Cartel and with Vicente Carrillo Fuentes of the Juárez Cartel. Since early 2010, Los Zetas broke relations with their former employers, the Gulf Cartel, causing a violent turf war throughout the border states of Tamaulipas and Nuevo León in northeastern Mexico. The war between these two criminal organizations has left thousands dead.

Lazcano is suspected of killing hundreds of people, including the journalist Francisco Ortiz Franco, who was assassinated in 2004 in front of his two children as he was leaving a clinic. Lazcano played a particular role in Los Zetas; with his military training, he was able to combine "military precision with stone-hearted criminality." When he was in power, Lazcano would go with his organization into several regions of Mexico, find out who was in charge of the local kidnapping, human trafficking, and extortion rings, and kill them to take over their business. The rest were then told to join or die.

At its peak, Lazcano's criminal empire consisted of about 10,000 gunmen stretching from the Rio Grande all the way into Central America.

=== Torture methods ===
Lazcano made a name for himself by decapitating his victims, putting them in acid baths, and for torturing and killing hundreds of people.

Lazcano became known for using a torture method known as "La Paleta" ('The Popsicle'), in which victims were stripped naked and brutally beaten with a board. A reporter also recalls that Lazcano reportedly tied a man to a tree and beat him until he broke his legs, and then left him tied to the tree for two or three days until he died. According to the Mexican authorities, Lazcano owned a ranch with several lions and tigers, which he used to get rid of his victims. Lazcano also used effective intimidation kills to keep his subordinates in check. He reportedly dumped his victims (or their children) in large barrels of boiling oil. When he found out that some of his men were stealing from him, Lazcano would force one of them to watch while his henchmen grabbed a 2-by-4 and beat the other to death. When they were dead, the executioner would then cut out the victim's heart (Lazcano threw the organs away, but other drug lords have forced their guests to eat the organs of the victims). Lazcano also pioneered the decapitation techniques that Los Zetas now employ, and protected witnesses have said that Lazcano would let captured rivals starve to death because he liked to watch the process or that he would let them be eaten by wild animals.

=== Los Zetas infighting ===
In a flurry of articles on late August 2012, a U.S. law enforcement official told the press that Miguel Treviño Morales, the former second-in-command of Los Zetas, had reportedly taken the leadership of the cartel and displaced Lazcano, the long-time leader. Due to his violent and confrontational personality, Treviño Morales began the process of taking over the assets of Los Zetas and removing Lazcano in early 2010.

At the beginning, Lazcano was happy to have a man like Treviño Morales in his ranks, but he reportedly underestimated him and gave him too much power. The active role of Treviño Morales got him the loyalty and respect of many in Los Zetas, and eventually many stopped paying loyalty to Lazcano. Personality-wise, Treviño Morales and Lazcano are opposing figures; Treviño Morales tended to prefer violence, while Lazcano was a lot steadier, and preferred to keep his organization as a stable group. Lazcano reportedly wanted Los Zetas to be less of a problem for the next political administration of Enrique Peña Nieto; in contrast, "Treviño Morales was someone who wanted to fight the fight." Los Zetas are inherently an unstable organized crime group with a long history of brutal violence, with the possibility of constant internal crisis if the organization exists without its central command.

It was later confirmed, however, that Treviño Morales and Lazcano had actually kept their alliance, and that the rumors of the infighting started when several men of Treviño Morales' faction did not want him as leader.

== Bounty ==
Lazcano was wanted by American and Mexican authorities for multiple murders and drug trafficking charges. American officials offered a bounty of $5 million (USD), and Mexican officials offered a bounty of 30 million pesos (equivalent to $2 million USD).

Lazcano had several aliases, including but not limited to: Z-3, Laz, El Lazca, El Bronce ('The Bronze'), El Muñeco ('The Doll'), El Pitirijas ('The Dude'), El Licenciado ('The Lawyer'), and El Verdugo ('The Executioner').

He was ranked by law enforcement officials at the top of the list of Mexico's most-wanted drug lords, often credited as being the second most-wanted, just behind Joaquín "El Chapo" Guzmán. Nonetheless, both of them come from very different backgrounds and present different challenges to the Mexican government. Guzmán is the modern version of the "old school" drug boss, although the extreme violence from Los Zetas has forced his organization to sometimes contradict its politics. Los Zetas, on the other hand, are the "cartel of our time," who opt for brutal violence.

=== Kingpin Act sanction ===
On 20 July 2009, the United States Department of the Treasury sanctioned Lazcano under the Foreign Narcotics Kingpin Designation Act (sometimes referred to simply as the "Kingpin Act"), for his involvement in drug trafficking along with three other international criminals. The act prohibited U.S. citizens and companies from doing any kind of business activity with him, and virtually froze all his assets in the U.S.

== Manhunt ==
On 21 April 2012 the Mexican Armed Forces raided a party in the city of Monclova, Coahuila, with the objective of capturing Lazcano. The musical group Banda Jerez was playing during the party and reportedly dedicated a song to El Lazca, who fled the scene and avoided his capture. Heriberto Lazcano was declared dead twice following manhunts for him, but both reports turned out to be false before he was finally killed in October 2012.

=== Allegations of death ===
There had been multiple unconfirmed reports that Lazcano may have been killed in the years leading up to his actual death, but all of the allegations were disproved by the Mexican and U.S. authorities. Two reports by U.S. newspapers The Monitor and The Brownsville Herald indicated that Lazcano had been killed in a gunbattle with a Mexican Army on the streets of Matamoros, Tamaulipas on 17 June 2011. The articles stated that Los Zetas had held a meeting in Matamoros with the Gulf Cartel, which explained why Lazcano was there in the first place.

The U.S. Department of State later confirmed that "the physical characteristics of the dead men allow the conclusion to be drawn that Heriberto Lazcano, leader of the Zetas criminal organization, was not among them."

== Death ==
On 7 October 2012, the Mexican Navy responded to a civilian complaint reporting the presence of gunmen in Progreso, Coahuila. Upon the navy's arrival, Lazcano and one gunman—who were inside a white van—opened fire against the marines, triggering a shootout that left Lazcano, his gunman, and one marine dead. The vehicle was found to contain a grenade launcher, 12 grenades, possibly a rocket-propelled grenade launcher, and two rifles, according to the Navy. The Navy managed to confirm his death through fingerprint verification and photographs of his corpse before handing the body to the local authorities. However, before the Navy could make an official announcement of his death, several heavily armed and masked gunmen, presumably under orders of Miguel Treviño Morales, stormed the funeral home where his body lay with that of the other man involved in the shooting. Homero Ramos, Coahuila's state prosecutor, said: "A masked, armed group overpowered the personnel, took the bodies, and forced the owner of the funeral home to drive the getaway vehicle."

At the time of his death, Lazcano was 1.80 m (5 ft 11 in) tall and not 1.60 m (5 ft 3 in), as previously estimated by the authorities.

The Mexican Navy did not identify Lazcano until his body was snatched from the funeral home in Sabinas, Coahuila, a testament to the drug lord's low-profile behavior. At first, the Navy thought the two gunmen killed in the shootout were low-level criminals, which explains why they were taken to a funeral parlor. Once the bodies were taken, the police matched the fingerprints and photos with those of Lazcano. He was able to be identified because when Lazcano was in the military, his fingerprints were on file; he also spent some time in jail early in his career, and his prints may have been taken there. It is not surprising, however, that Lazcano was not identified immediately, given that there were very few pictures of him. The fact that he had also spent some time in Guatemala and overseas, and that the Navy was responding to a civilian tip regarding armed men at a baseball game, made his presence unexpected. His entourage was also uncharacteristic for a major drug trafficker, although it is quite common for cartel leaders to travel in small groups to avoid attracting unnecessary attention. Unlike other drug traffickers, Lazcano was elusive and avoided opulence and power to keep a low profile. He was one of the most secretive drug lords in Mexico, mainly because he had been trained in military intelligence.

=== Background ===
Lazcano was the most powerful cartel leader to be killed since the start of Mexico's drug war in 2006.

Lazcano's death differs from those of other cartel leaders in Mexico – including the Gulf Cartel kingpin Antonio Cárdenas Guillén, La Familia Michoacana leader Nazario Moreno González and the Beltrán-Leyva Cartel leader Arturo Beltrán Leyva – as they died in gun battles that lasted hours. Moreover, it was not the first time Mexican cartel members have recovered the bodies of their associates. The body of Arturo Guzmán Decena, the founder of Los Zetas, was snatched after a shootout with the Mexican Army in 2002. In 2010, the Mexican police killed the drug lord Nazario Moreno González of La Familia Michoacana in a gun battle; before they could take the body, his gunmen carried it off. Taking the bodies of their fallen comrades is a part of Los Zetas' military culture, in which gunmen are taught to not leave their comrades behind.

This death came just hours after the Navy arrested a high-ranking Zeta member in Nuevo Laredo, Tamaulipas, Salvador Alfonso Martínez Escobedo. The suspect, known by his code name, "La Ardilla" ('The Squirrel'), was linked to two massacres in northeastern Mexico: the mass murder of 72 migrants in 2010 and the mass graves with more than 200 people in 2011; he is also believed to be responsible for two massive jail breaks, and for the assassination of David Hartley, a U.S. citizen, in Falcon Lake near the U.S-Mexico border on 30 September 2010. Martínez Escobedo knew Lazcano personally and made him the godfather of his 2010 wedding; he helped the authorities identify the corpse of Lazcano, although it is unclear if he did it through the photographs or in person.

=== Analysis of repercussions ===
The apparent death of Lazcano benefited three parties: the Mexican Navy, who dealt a significant blow to organized crime with the death of Lazcano; Miguel Treviño Morales, who, until his capture on 15 July 2013, rose as the "uncontested" leader of Los Zetas; and Joaquín "El Chapo" Guzmán, who, until his capture on 22 February 2014, was the leader of the Sinaloa Cartel and the main rival of Los Zetas. (El Chapo would later escape from prison on 11 July 2015 and resume control of the cartel.) El Chapo was perhaps the biggest winner of the three, since his primary goal was to take over the smuggling routes in Nuevo Laredo, Tamaulipas, the headquarters of Treviño Morales. If the body hadn't been taken, it would also be a symbolic victory for Felipe Calderón, who can say that his administration took down one of the founders and top leaders of Los Zetas and consequently boost the morale of the Mexican military.

It is still unclear, however, if Lazcano's absence will drastically change the operational structure of Los Zetas. In the months prior to his death, Miguel Treviño Morales had taken the lead of Los Zetas while Lazcano's power declined. When the rumors of his supposed death in 2011 were denied, he fell off the radar and spent much of his time hiding in South America and Europe. There were also false rumors that Lazcano had terminal cancer. (Note: Post-mortem reports indicated that Lazcano did not suffer from any terminal disease.) It is likely that Lazcano had very little control over the operational aspects of his organization, considering that Los Zetas operate like a franchise rather than by the "traditional top-down hierarchy" of other drug trafficking organizations. Therefore, his death may not impact Los Zetas as much as it could have, had he been killed in 2010. Ultimately, the death of Lazcano will not stop the split inside Los Zetas, given the organization's infrastructure, where its members can operate freely in local cells.

In addition, the power struggle of Los Zetas and Lazcano's absence will probably hurt the Juárez Cartel in its fight against Sinaloa Cartel for the control of the smuggling routes in the state of Chihuahua. Given the organization's fragmentation, the Zetas will probably not be able to support Vicente Carrillo Fuentes in Ciudad Juárez, which will allow them to fall prey to their competitors in the area. The infamous border town of Ciudad Juárez, which experienced more than 11,000 homicides from 2007 to 2012 and an average of 300 homicides a month in 2010, will probably remain calm. After violence reached its peak in October 2010, homicides have plummeted steadily in the city, mainly because the Sinaloa Cartel has managed to defeat the Juárez Cartel and its affiliated gangs. By late 2012, Ciudad Juárez "entered a new chapter" in Mexico's criminal underworld; Julián Leyzaola, the city's police chief, controlled the police forces; social programs like Todos Somos Juárez were implemented throughout the city; and, "perhaps the best indicator of a peaceful future," the Sinaloa Cartel managed to take control of the smuggling routes in the city as a full-pledged one-tier organization. According to the journalist Samuel Logan, Ciudad Juárez is likely to experience relative peace in the future as the Sinaloa Cartel fights off the remaining second-tier groups to establish a monopoly in the area.

The last standing members of the Juárez Cartel and its two gangs – La Línea and Los Aztecas – will continue to be in Ciudad Juárez after the death of Lazcano, but Logan alleges that it is unlikely that Los Zetas will make a push to fight for the turf. Miguel Treviño Morales of the Zeta cartel probably settled in Nuevo Laredo, Tamaulipas as the Sinaloa Cartel "deepens its dominance in the Mexican criminal system." The Juárez Cartel has been severely battered by the government and rival cartels, though it was once a major player in Mexico's drug trade. It is no longer a transnational criminal organization since it has lost its connection with drug suppliers elsewhere in Latin America, and is now a "second-tier" organization on par with Los Aztecas, as Logan alleges.

Analysts say that Lazcano's death does not signify the end of Los Zetas. As seen in other instances when top cartel leaders are taken out, fragmenting within the organizations occur, causing short-term violence. Los Zetas have a line of succession when leaders are arrested or killed, but the problem is that most of these replacements are younger, less-experienced members who are likely to resort to violence to maintain their reputation. The Mexican Navy disagrees with this hypothesis; they consider that the death of Lazcano will not increase drug-related violence or infightings within the cartel. Their reasoning lies on the fact that Miguel Treviño Morales "naturally" succeeded Lazcano and lead Los Zetas. In a response to the Navy's statements, InSight Crime believes that Lazcano's fall will not stop Los Zetas from fragmenting, making incursions from other cartels and infightings more likely to occur.

=== Memorial ===
In Puebla, several candles and flowers were left as offerings for Lazcano on the Day of the Dead to "help him through Mictlan," the underworld of Aztec mythology. The offering also had a picture of Lazcano, a beet juice cup, a copy of the Mexican Constitution, a colorful jokes book, and a book about skulls. in October 2014, a newspaper in Veracruz state published an obituary in memory of his second death anniversary and with details of a mass ceremony held in a local church.

== Philanthropy ==
On a wall of the chapel in the village of Tezontle, Hidalgo, a plaque says it was donated by Heriberto Lazcano: "Donated by Heriberto Lazcano Lazcano, Lord, hear my prayer", reads the bronze-colored marker, which states the chapel was built in honor of Pope John Paul II. The Rev. Juan Aguilar, spokesman for the Roman Catholic Archdiocese of Tulancingo, where the chapel is located, said it was built in 2009 as a community project and the money did not go through the church, which was unaware of who funded it. The revelation has the church distancing itself from the property while admitting it knows of other donations from drug traffickers. The federal Attorney General is investigating the funding of the Tezontle chapel for possible criminal charges, including money laundering or "use of illicit funds." The diocese will decide whether to continue using the chapel, depending on the results of the federal investigation.

Aside from financing a church in Tezontle, Lazcano also sponsored several other constructions and festivities in honor of Our Lady of San Juan de los Lagos every February, which helped him gain the gratitude of the villagers. He also organized several celebrations during Children's Day and promoted the events through a number of media outlets. This practice was borrowed from the drug lord Cárdenas Guillén, who organized Children's Day parties when Los Zetas and the Gulf Cartel were under a single command structure.

== See also ==
- Infighting in the Gulf Cartel
- 2011–12 in the Mexican drug war

== Sources ==
=== Bibliography ===
- Rodríguez Castañeda, Rafael (2012). Los rostros del narco (in Spanish). Mexico City: Grupo Planeta. p. 322. ISBN 978-6070711787.
- Deibert, Michael (2014). In the Shadow of Saint Death: The Gulf Cartel and the Price of America's Drug War in Mexico. Globe Pequot. ISBN 9780762791255.
- Grillo, Ioan (2012). El Narco: Inside Mexico's Criminal Insurgency (2nd ed.). New York: Bloomsbury Publishing. ISBN 978-1608192113.
