= Jesús Enrique Rejón Aguilar =

Mexican drug trafficker (born 1976)

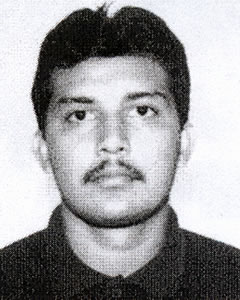
- Born: June 9, 1976 (age 50); Sabancuy, Carmen Municipality, Campeche, Mexico
- Other names: Z-7; El Mamito; Caballero
- Occupation: A former leader of Los Zetas
- Status: Captured (July 4, 2011) and Extradited to the United States (Sep 11, 2012)
- Criminal charges: Organized crime, murder, drug trafficking, mercenary

Jesús Enrique Rejón Aguilar (a.k.a. Z-7, El Mamito) is a former leader of the Mexican criminal organization known as Los Zetas. He was wanted by the governments of Mexico and the United States until his capture on July 4, 2011 in Atizapán de Zaragoza, a Mexico City suburb.

== Biography ==
Rejón Aguilar was born in Sabancuy, Carmen Municipality, Campeche, Mexico, in 1976. On April 3, 1993, Rejón Aguilar enlisted in the Mexican Army in his home state of Campeche and in 1996 was assigned to Special Forces Airmobile Group (GAFE). In 1997, he was assigned to Mexico's Federal Attorney General's Office (PGR) in the cities of Reynosa and Miguel Alemán in Tamaulipas. In 1998 he was assigned to Saltillo, Coahuila. He deserted the army in February 1999 and in March the same year, at the invitation of Arturo Guzmán Decena, known as "The Z1" was integrated into the group of 14 former soldiers who founded Los Zetas as the armed wing of the Gulf Cartel.

Rejón Aguilar oversaw the paramilitary training of new recruits and then oversaw Gulf Cartel trafficking activities in the state of Coahuila along with Alejandro Treviño Morales. Rejón Aguilar is responsible for multi-ton shipments of marijuana and multi-kilogram shipments of cocaine from Mexico to the United States. In 2004, Rejón Aguilar coordinated a failed raid on the maximum security prison 'El Altiplano', as he attempted to liberate his boss Osiel Cárdenas Guillén. According to government documents, his plan consisted of using 3 helicopters and over 50 Zeta members to liberate Cárdenas Guillén. In 2007 Rejón Aguilar was assigned to the streets of Nuevo Laredo and Miguel Alemán under the command of Miguel Treviño Morales, where he remained until early 2009.

After the split between the Gulf Cartel and Los Zetas in 2010, Rejón Aguilar was assigned as the regional coordinator in the states of central and northern Mexico.

== Kingpin Act sanction ==
On 24 March 2010, the United States Department of the Treasury sanctioned Rejón Aguilar under the Foreign Narcotics Kingpin Designation Act (sometimes referred to simply as the "Kingpin Act"), for his involvement in drug trafficking along with fifty-three other international criminals and ten foreign entities. The act prohibited U.S. citizens and companies from doing any kind of business activity with him, and virtually froze all his assets in the U.S.

=== Capture ===
Mexican authorities had posted a $30 million peso (US$2.3 million) bounty for Rejón Aguilar, while the United States posted in July 2009 a US$5 million bounty. On July 4, 2011, police captured Rejón in a Mexico City suburb without firing a shot.

Rejón Aguilar was extradited to the United States on 11 September 2012 for drug trafficking and organized crime charges, pleading guilty for conspiracy to traffic large sums of narcotics to the U.S. in February 2013. He faces a mandatory 10-year sentence and a maximum sentence of life in prison.

== See also ==
- War on drugs
- Mérida Initiative
- Mexican drug war
