= Bernardo Ruiz (filmmaker) =

Mexican–American documentary filmmaker

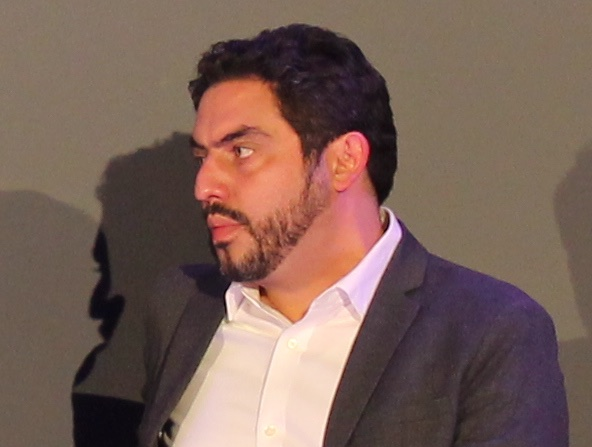
- Ruiz in 2015
- Occupations: Film director, television producer
- Years active: 2003–present
- Known for: Documentaries
- Notable work: The Infinite Race (2020); Kingdom of Shadows (2015); The Graduates/Los Graduados (2013); Reportero (2012); American Experience: Roberto Clemente (2008); The Sixth Sense (2003)

Bernardo Ruiz is a Mexican–American documentary filmmaker. He directed and produced the documentary Reportero about attacks on the press in Mexico. He is the founder of Quiet Pictures.

== Awards and nominations ==
- 2017 - News & Documentary Emmy Award nomination for Outstanding Business and Economic Documentary, Kingdom of Shadows
- 2014 - News & Documentary Emmy Award nomination for Outstanding Informational Programming – Long Form, Reportero
- 2012 - Cinema Tropical Awards - Nominee Best U.S. Latino Documentary, Reportero
- 2008 - ALMA Award for Outstanding Made for TV Documentary, American Experience: Roberto Clemente
- 2003 - Morelia International Film Festival - Best Short Documentary

== Filmography ==
- 2020 (Director), The Infinite Race. Part of ESPN's 30 for 30 series.
- 2020 (Director), "Latino Vote: Dispatches from the Battleground"
- 2018 (Director/Producer), "Harvest Season"
- 2015 (Director/Producer), "Kingdom of Shadows" (Spanish title: "Lo que reina en las sombras")
- 2013 (Executive Producer, Series Director), The Graduates/Los Graduados
- 2012 (Director/Producer), Reportero
- 2008 (Director/Producer), American Experience: Roberto Clemente
- 2003 (co-producer), The Sixth Section
