= Rafael Hernández =

Rafael Hernández may refer to:

- Rafael Hernández Colón (1936–2019), governor of the Commonwealth of Puerto Rico
- Rafael Hernández Marín (1892–1965), Puerto Rican composer
  - Rafael Hernández Airport, an airport named after the Puerto Rican composer in Aguadilla, Puerto Rico
- Rafael Hernández Ochoa (1915–1990), Mexican politician, governor of Veracruz
- Rafael Tobías Hernández Alvarado (born 1953), known as Toby Hernandez, former Major League Baseball catcher for the Toronto Blue Jays
- Rafael Hernández (actor) (1928–1997), Spanish actor
- Rafael Hernández Montañez (born 1972), Puerto Rican politician
- Rafael Hernández Rojas (born 1946), Mexican Olympic swimmer
- Rafael Cedeño Hernández, imprisoned Mexican drug trafficker
- Rafael Batista Hernández (born 1936), Spanish footballer
- Rafael Mas Hernández (1950–2003), Spanish geographer
- Rafael Hernandez (Days of Our Lives), fictional soap opera character from Days of Our Lives
- Rafael Hernandez (jockey), Puerto Rican thoroughbred racing jockey
