= Alberto Espinoza Barrón =

Mexican former drug trafficker

- Born: Mexico
- Other names: La Fresa (The Strawberry)
- Occupation: Prisoner
- Status: Incarcerated at "Centro Federal de Occidente "El Rincón"
- Criminal charges: Drug trafficking
- Penalty: 20 years

Alberto Espinoza Barrón (also known as La Fresa or 'The Strawberry') is a Mexican former drug trafficker and lieutenant of the La Familia Michoacana ("Michoacán Family") drug cartel.

Alberto Espinoza was arrested by the Mexican military on 29 December 2008, and was succeeded by Rafael Cedeño Hernández, who was also arrested on 20 April 2009.

== See also ==
- War on drugs
- Mérida Initiative
- Mexican drug war
