= Mexican drug war =

War between Mexico's government and various drug trafficking syndicates

- Part of violent crime and the drug trade in Mexico and Latin America, and the war on cartels
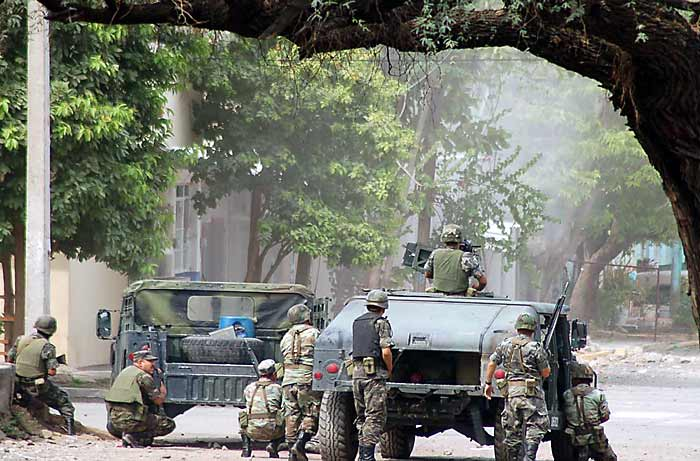
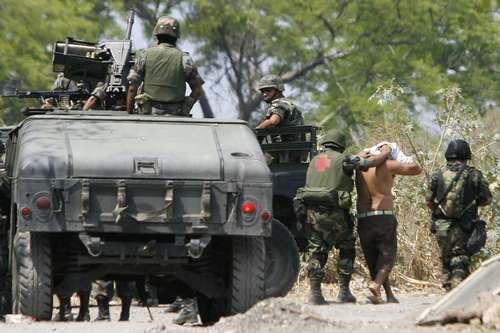
- Mexican soldiers during a confrontation in Apatzingán, August 2007 Mexican soldiers detaining suspects in Michoacán
Date	December 11, 2006 – present (19 years, 11 months, 1 week and 3 days)
Location	Latin America and the Caribbean (Note: Throughout Mexico, with occasional spillover across international borders into Texas, Arizona, New Mexico, California, and into the Central and South American countries of El Salvador, Honduras, Guatemala, Nicaragua, Belize, Venezuela, Colombia, Ecuador, as well as the Caribbean Sea and the Philippines.)
Status	Ongoing

Belligerents
Mexico; Armed Forces; Army; Special Forces Corps; Air Force; Navy; Marine Corps; FES; National Guard (since 2019); Secretariat of Security and Citizen Protection (Note: Originally the Secretariat of Public Security until 2013, when the cabinet post was abolished; reestablished in 2018 under the current name); Federal Police (Note: Known as the Federal Preventative Police until 2009) (until 2019); National Intelligence Centre; Attorney General's Office (Note: Known as the Prosecutor General's Office until 2019); Federal Ministerial Police (Note: Known as the Federal Investigation Agency until 2009); State and municipal police forces; Self-defense groups; Foreign support: United States; Mérida Initiative; CIA (alleged); Colombia; National Police of Colombia; Australia; Australian Federal Police; Canada; Royal Canadian Mounted Police; Anti-Crime Capacity Building Program; Philippines; National Bureau of Investigation; Knights of Columbus; Guatemala; National Civil Police; Belize; Belize Police Department; Popular Revolutionary Army (EPR); Zapatista autonomous region; Zapatista Army of National Liberation	Mexican cartels: Sinaloa Cartel; CJNG; Northeast Cartel; Gulf Cartel; Other cartels and gangs: LNFM; Los Viagras; Juárez Cartel; Cárteles Unidos; CSRL; Caborca Cartel; La Línea; Tijuana Cartel; La Unión Tepito; Los Mazatlecos; La Barredora; Guerreros Unidos; Sangre Nueva Zeta; Zetas Vieja Escuela; Los Mexicles; Other minor cartels and criminal gangs, including paramilitary factions that serve as armed wings of the cartels; Defunct cartels: La Familia Michoacana (1980–2011; succeeded by the LNFM); Los Zetas (1997–2015; succeeded by the Northeast Cartel); Knights Templar Cartel (2010–2017); Sonora Cartel (1987–2007; succeeded by the Caborca Cartel); Milenio Cartel (1980–2010; succeeded by the CJNG); Los Negros (2003–2010); CIDA (2010–2014); Beltrán-Leyva Cartel (1996–2017); Other support: Mexican narcosystem; Cartel of the Suns; FARC–EP (1964–2017); Primeiro Comando da Capital; Mexican Mafia; Mara Salvatrucha; Logan Heights Gang; Barrio Azteca; Organized crime in Italy; Albanian mafia

Commanders and leaders
Felipe Calderón (Note: 2006–2012); Enrique Peña Nieto (Note: 2012–2018); Andrés Manuel López Obrador (Note: 2018–2024); Claudia Sheinbaum (Note: 2024–present); (Mexico) Guillermo Galván; (Mexico) Salvador Cienfuegos; (Mexico) Luis Cresencio Sandoval; (Mexico) Ricardo Trevilla Trejo; See full list: (Mexico) Mariano Francisco Saynez (2006–2012); (Mexico) Vidal Francisco Soberón Sanz (2012–2018); (Mexico) José Rafael Ojeda Durán (2018–2024); (Mexico) Raymundo Pedro Morales Ángeles (2024–present); Genaro García Luna (2006–2012) (Note: Later arrested, tried, and convicted by the United States in 2023 for taking millions of dollars in bribes in exchange for protecting the Sinaloa Cartel); Alfonso Durazo (2018–2020); Rosa Icela Rodríguez (2020–2024); Omar García Harfuch (2024–present); Eduardo Medina-Mora (2006-2009); Arturo Chávez Chávez (2009–2011); Marisela Morales (2011–2012); Jesús Murillo Karam (2012-2015); Arely Gómez González (2015-2016); Raúl Cervantes Andrade (2016–2017); Alberto Elías Beltrán (2017–2018); Alejandro Gertz Manero (2018–2025); Ernestina Godoy Ramos (2025-present); Edmundo Reyes (Note: 2006–present); Subcomandante Marcos; Subcomandante Elisa	Iván Archivaldo Guzmán Salazar; Jesús Alfredo Guzmán Salazar; Ismael Zambada Sicairos; Juan Carlos Valencia González; Julio Alberto Castillo Rodríguez; See full list: El Chapo (surrendered); El Mayo (surrendered); El Azul (Note: El Azul continues to appear on U.S. government reward lists. Despite being presumed dead, his wanted poster has not been removed, indicating that the U.S. still considers him a living fugitive. Furthermore, the FBI believes he may have undergone plastic surgery.); Vicente Zambada Niebla (surrendered); Ignacio Coronel Villarreal X; Ovidio Guzmán López (surrendered); Joaquín Guzmán López (surrendered); Manuel Torres Félix X; Misael Torres Urrea (surrendered); José Rodrigo Aréchiga Gamboa X; René Velázquez Valenzuela X; Serafín Zambada Ortiz; Jorge Humberto Figueroa Benítez X; Tony Tormenta X; Jorge Eduardo Costilla Sánchez (surrendered); Mario Cárdenas Guillén (surrendered); Mario Ramírez Treviño #; Homero Cárdenas Guillén (Note: Alleged death); Gregorio Sauceda-Gamboa (surrendered); Juan Reyes Mejía-González; El Mencho †; Érick Valencia Salazar (surrendered); Martín Arzola Ortega X; Antonio Oseguera Cervantes (surrendered); Abigael González Valencia (surrendered); El Menchito (surrendered); Audias Flores Silva (surrendered); Jorge Luis Mendoza Cárdenas; Gerardo González Valencia (surrendered); El Chepa (surrendered); El Elvis; Rosalinda González Valencia; Jessica Johanna Oseguera González; Laisha Michelle Oseguera González; Heriberto Lazcano Lazcano X; Miguel Treviño Morales (surrendered); Omar Treviño Morales (surrendered); Jaime González Durán (surrendered); Jesús Enrique Rejón Aguilar (surrendered); Galindo Mellado Cruz X; El Talibán (surrendered); El Canicón #; Sergio Enrique Ruiz Tlapanco (surrendered); Raúl Lucio Hernández Lechuga (surrendered); Flavio Méndez Santiago (surrendered); Sergio Peña Solís (surrendered); El Gori II; Raymundo Almanza Morales (surrendered); Servando Gómez Martínez (surrendered); Dionisio Loya Plancarte (surrendered); José de Jesús Méndez Vargas (surrendered); Nazario Moreno González X; Enrique Plancarte Solís X; Carlos Rosales Mendoza X; Arnoldo Rueda Medina (surrendered); Rafael Cedeño Hernández (surrendered); Alberto Espinoza Barrón (surrendered); Rafael Caro Quintero (surrendered); Vicente Carrillo Fuentes (surrendered); Vicente Carrillo Leyva (surrendered); Juan Pablo Ledezma; Arturo Beltrán Leyva X; Alfredo Beltrán Leyva (surrendered); Carlos Beltrán Leyva (surrendered); Héctor Beltrán Leyva #; La Barbie (surrendered); Sergio Villarreal Barragán (surrendered); Jose Rodolfo Villarreal-Hernandez (surrendered); Héctor Huerta Ríos X; Alberto Pineda Villa X; Francisco Hernández García (surrendered); Francisco Rafael Arellano Félix X; Eduardo Arellano Félix (surrendered); Luis Fernando Sánchez Arellano (surrendered); El Teo (surrendered); Enedina Arellano Félix; Edgardo Leyva Escandón; El Marro (surrendered); Fausto Isidro Meza Flores (surrendered)

Strength
Total: 784,300; See full list: 368,000 police officers; 277,000 soldiers; 107,000 National Guard members; 23,300 self-defense group; 9,000 guerrilla group	Cartels: 175,000 (2022 est.)

Casualties and losses
Total: 4,986 killed or missing; See full list: 743 servicemen killed and 137 missing; 4,038 federal, state, and municipal police killed; 66 members of the Policía Comunitaria killed; EPR: 2 EPR members killed	Total: 12,456 killed (2006–10 est.); Captured: 121,199 cartel members detained (2006–2009); 8,500 cartel members convicted (2006–2010)
- Total deaths: 350,000–400,000 (2006–2021) (Note: Includes violence between organized crime groups not involving the government.); Other info: 41,034 dead in war conflicts between identified parties from 2006–2020; 60,000+ missing (2020)

The Mexican drug war (Spanish: Guerra contra el narcotráfico en México) is an ongoing asymmetric armed conflict between the Mexican government and various drug trafficking syndicates. When the Mexican military intervened in 2006, the government's main objective was to reduce drug-related violence. The Mexican government has asserted that its primary focus is on dismantling the cartels and preventing drug trafficking. The conflict has been described as the Mexican theater of the global war on drugs, as led by the United States federal government. Analysts estimate wholesale earnings from illicit drug sales range from $13.6 to $49.4 billion annually.

Although Mexican drug trafficking organizations have existed for decades, their power increased after the demise of the Colombian Cali and Medellín cartels in the 1990s, and the fragmentation of the Guadalajara Cartel in the late 1980s. The conflict formally began with President Felipe Calderón (2006–2012) launching Operation Michoacán in 2006, which deployed tens of thousands of federal troops and police in a militarized campaign against the cartels initially targeted in Michoacán, Ciudad Juárez, Tijuana, and Tamaulipas. However, arrests and killings of cartel leaders caused cartels to splinter into smaller, more violent factions, escalating turf wars and contributing to rising homicide rates nationwide. By the end of Calderón's administration in 2012, the official death toll of the Mexican drug war was at least 60,000. Estimates set the death toll above 120,000 killed by 2013, not counting 27,000 missing.

Successive administrations have promised changes in strategy but have upheld the use of militarized tactics. Under President Enrique Peña Nieto (2012–2018), the government pledged to shift focus from high-profile arrests to de-escalation and reducing violence, but setbacks such as the prison escape of cartel leader Joaquín "El Chapo" Guzmán and the 2014 Iguala mass kidnapping drew international condemnation. President Andrés Manuel López Obrador (2018–2024) pledged to address the social roots of crime through poverty reduction and youth programs, and declared that the war was over; however, the statement was criticized, as security policy continued to rely on the newly created National Guard, which has gradually replaced the Mexican Army in policing roles. This strategy has continued under President Claudia Sheinbaum (2024–present).

Since the beginning of the conflict, law enforcement in Mexico has been criticized for corruption, collusion with cartels, and impunity. Federal law enforcement has been reorganized at least five times since 1982. During this period, there have been at least four elite special forces created as new, corruption-free soldiers who could fight Mexico's endemic bribery system. The militarization of Mexican society has drawn criticism for human rights abuses, such as extrajudicial killings, enforced disappearances, targeting of journalists, and torture.

== Background ==
Due to its location, Mexico has long been used as a staging and transshipment point for narcotics and contraband between Latin America and United States markets. Mexican bootleggers supplied alcohol to American gangsters throughout Prohibition in the U.S., and the onset of the illegal drug trade with the U.S. began when Prohibition came to an end in 1933. In 1940, under president Lázaro Cárdenas and the direction of Mexican psychiatrist Leopoldo Salazar Viniegra, Mexico legalized all drugs, in an early attempt to prevent the development of illegal drug trafficking organizations. The law was in effect for about 5 months when the Mexican government repealed it, allegedly under the increasing economic and political pressure from the U.S.

During World War II, the United States experienced shortages of medical morphine after opium supplies from Asia were disrupted by the Pacific War. In response, Mexican authorities, in cooperation with U.S. officials, expanded regulated opium poppy cultivation in northwestern Mexico, including rural areas surrounding Culiacán in the state of Sinaloa. Farmers in the mountainous regions of Sierra Madre Occidental near Culiacán, produced opium that was processed into legal morphine for wartime medical use by Allied forces. Although the program ended after 1945, the agricultural knowledge, smuggling routes, and local intermediary networks developed during the wartime period persisted. Historians and criminologists have identified these postwar networks as an early foundation for later illicit drug trafficking organizations in Sinaloa.

From the late 1960s to the early 1970s, with the rapid surge in recreational drug use in the U.S., the production of narcotics in Mexico, particularly marijuana, expanded exponentially, and Mexican criminals started to smuggle drugs on a major scale. During the 1960s and 1970s, Mexico participated in a series of U.S.-backed anti-narcotics initiatives, including Operation Intercept and Operation Condor. These operations were formally justified on the grounds of combating the cultivation of opium poppies and marijuana in Mexico's so-called "Golden Triangle" region, an area encompassing parts of the states of Sinaloa, Durango, and Chihuahua.

As part of the campaign, the Mexican government deployed about 10,000 soldiers and police. The operation resulted in mass arrests, torture, and imprisonment of peasants who were often accused of aiding leftist insurgency groups, but no major traffickers were captured. Contemporary assessments deemed the initiatives a failure, citing their inability to curb narcotics production, enabling military corruption, and their record of human rights abuses in rural areas.

As U.S. efforts in the war on drugs intensified, crackdowns in Florida and the Caribbean during the Miami drug war forced Colombian traffickers to develop new routes for smuggling cocaine into the United States. By the early 1980s, the Medellin Cartel and Cali Cartel oversaw production, while distribution increasingly relied on Mexican traffickers. Drawing on existing heroin and cannabis smuggling networks, the Guadalajara Cartel, led by Miguel Ángel Félix Gallardo, emerged as intermediaries, transporting Colombian cocaine across the Mexico–United States border.

By the mid-1980s, the Guadalajara Cartel had firmly established itself as a reliable transporter, initially paid in cash but shifting by the late 1980s to a payment-in-kind arrangement. While many factors contributed to the escalation of drug trafficking violence, security analysts trace the origins of cartel power to the unraveling of an implicit arrangement between traffickers and then-ruling Institutional Revolutionary Party (PRI), which began to lose its grip on power in the 1980s. The fighting between rival drug cartels began in earnest after the 1989 arrest of Félix Gallardo, with cartel infighting escalating in the 1990s.

== Government operations ==
=== Vicente Fox ===
The PRI ruled Mexico for over 70 years, during which cartels grew in power and anti-drug efforts targeted the seizure of marijuana and opium crops in remote regions. In 2000, Vicente Fox of the National Action Party (PAN) became the first non-PRI president since 1929; his term saw declining homicide rates through 2007, and initially, broad public optimism about regime change.

Los Zetas, then the armed wing of the Gulf Cartel, based in Nuevo Laredo, Tamaulipas, escalated violence to unprecedented levels in the summer of 2003 through gruesome violence and military-like tactics against the Sinaloa Cartel. Los Zetas turf conflict also instilled terror against journalists and civilians of Nuevo Laredo. This set a new precedent, which cartels later mimicked. These activities were not widely reported by the Mexican media at the time. However, key conflicts occurred, including the Sinaloa Cartel counterattacks and the advance on the Gulf Cartel's main regions in Tamaulipas.

It is estimated that in the first eight months of 2005, about 110 people died in Nuevo Laredo, Tamaulipas, as a result of the fighting between the Gulf and Sinaloa cartels. The same year, there was another surge in violence in the state of Michoacán as La Familia Michoacana drug cartel established itself after splintering from its former allies, the Gulf Cartel and Los Zetas.

=== Felipe Calderón ===
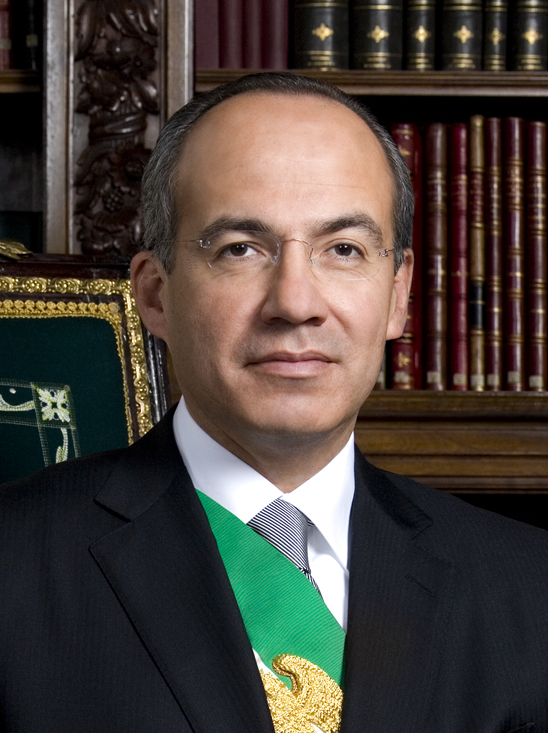
President Felipe Calderón

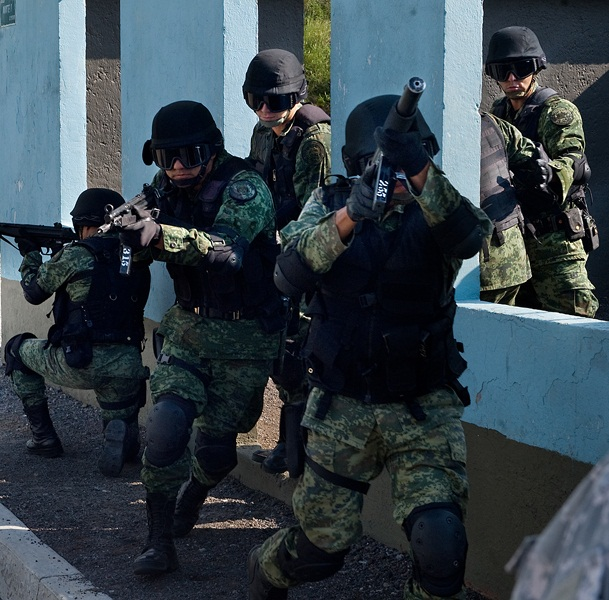
Mexican soldiers training in August 2010

Following the contested 2006 presidential election, Felipe Calderón initiated Operation Michoacán, a militarized campaign against drug cartels as an effort to consolidate political authority, strengthen the legitimacy of his administration, and rally public support. Often described as the first major campaign of the conflict, Operation Michoacán marked the beginning of large-scale confrontations between government forces and drug cartels, eventually involving about 45,000 troops together with state and federal police.

Calderón's government pioneered a militarized "kingpin strategy" that relied on Mexican Army and Federal Police deployments to capture or kill cartel leaders. This security approach was led by Genaro García Luna (Secretariat of Public Security), Eduardo Medina Mora (Attorney General of Mexico), and Guillermo Galván Galván (Secretariat of National Defense). Early operations included Operation Baja California, Operation Sinaloa, and Operation Chihuahua. Although drug-related violence spiked markedly in contested areas along the U.S. border, such as Ciudad Juárez, Tijuana, and Matamoros, the government was initially successful in detaining and killing high-ranking cartel members, including Alfredo Beltrán Leyva, Arturo Beltrán Leyva, Ignacio Coronel Villarreal, Antonio Cárdenas Guillén, and Vicente Carrillo Leyva. Calderón expressed that the cartels seek "to replace the government" and "are trying to impose a monopoly by force of arms, and are even trying to impose their own laws".

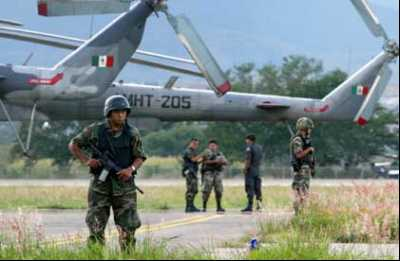
Cooperation of the Mexican Navy in the Mexican Army transfer as well as the recognition of cultivation areas

Although Calderón's strategy intended to end violence between rival cartels, critics argue that it worsened the conflict. By removing cartel leaders through arrests or killings, his administration created leadership vacuums that sparked internal power struggles and greater competition between cartels. Balance of power shifts meant that new cartels emerged as other groups weakened, for example, the fragmentation of La Familia Michoacana, which gave rise to the Knights Templar Cartel. Splintered cartels fought to exploit overlapping patches of smuggling routes and territories, and also sought to manipulate the system by leaking intelligence to Mexican authorities or the U.S. Drug Enforcement Administration (DEA) to turn law enforcement against their rivals, using knowledge from the groups they had broken away from.

During Calderón's presidential term, the murder rate of Mexico increased dramatically. Annual homicides rose from more than 5,000 in 2008 to 9,600 in 2009 and over 15,000 in 2010. By the end of Calderón's presidency, his administration's statistics claimed that, during his six-year term, 50,000 drug-related homicides occurred. Outside sources claimed more than 120,000 murders happened in the same period as a result of Calderón's strategy. Some analysts, including U.S. Ambassador in Mexico Carlos Pascual, argued that this increase was a direct result of Calderón's military measures. Between 2007 and 2012, Mexico's National Human Rights Commission received nearly 5,800 complaints of military abuse and issued around 90 detailed reports documenting violations against civilians committed while the armed forces carried out policing duties. The Mexican military operated with minimal accountability for abuses committed in its campaigns.

==== Escalation (2008–12) ====
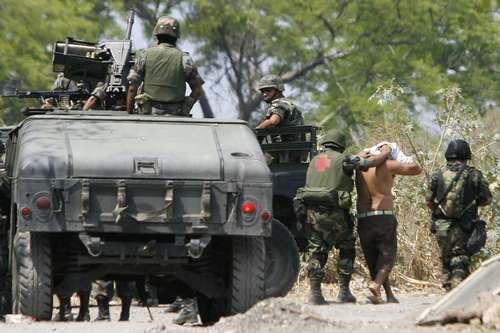
Mexican army fighting drug cartels in Michoacán

In April 2008, General Sergio Aponte Polito, the man in charge of the anti-drug campaign in the state of Baja California, made several allegations of corruption against the police forces in the region. Among his claims, Aponte stated that he believed Baja California's anti-kidnapping squad was actually a kidnapping team working in conjunction with organized crime, and that bribed police units were used as bodyguards for drug traffickers. These accusations sent shock waves through the state government. Many of the more than 50 accused officials quit or fled. Four months later, Aponte was relieved of his command.

Between 2009 and 2011, Ciudad Juárez, Chihuahua recorded the highest homicide rate in the world, with more than 200 murders per 100,000 inhabitants. Much of the violence was driven by clashes between the Sinaloa Cartel and the Juárez Cartel, and the resulting breakdown of public security produced a climate of pervasive lawlessness. In March 2009, President Calderón called in an additional 5,000 Mexican Army troops to Ciudad Juárez. The U.S. Department of Homeland Security also said that it was considering using state National Guard troops to help the U.S. Border Patrol counter the threat of drug violence in Mexico from spilling over the border into the U.S. The governors of Arizona and Texas encouraged the federal government to use additional National Guard troops from their states to help those already there supporting state law enforcement efforts against drug trafficking. In 2008, Calderón signed the Mérida Initiative with the United States, which provided funding, training, and intelligence, and allowed U.S. personnel to operate in Mexico in advisory and intelligence-sharing capacities.

By 2011, the Mexican Armed Forces had captured 11,544 people who were believed to have been involved with the cartels and organized crime. In the year prior, 28,000 individuals were arrested on drug-related charges. In October 2012, Mexican Navy forces killed Heriberto Lazcano, leader of Los Zetas, in a shootout in Sabinas, Coahuila, after gunmen attacked their patrol. The operation came just hours after the capture of another senior Zeta, Salvador Alfonso Martínez Escobedo. Lazcano's death is viewed as the most significant cartel leader killing in Calderón's administration. It strengthened the Navy's standing, allowed Miguel Treviño Morales to take control of Los Zetas, and ultimately benefited Joaquín "El Chapo" Guzmán, whose Sinaloa Cartel sought to dominate the Nuevo Laredo smuggling routes.

=== Enrique Peña Nieto ===
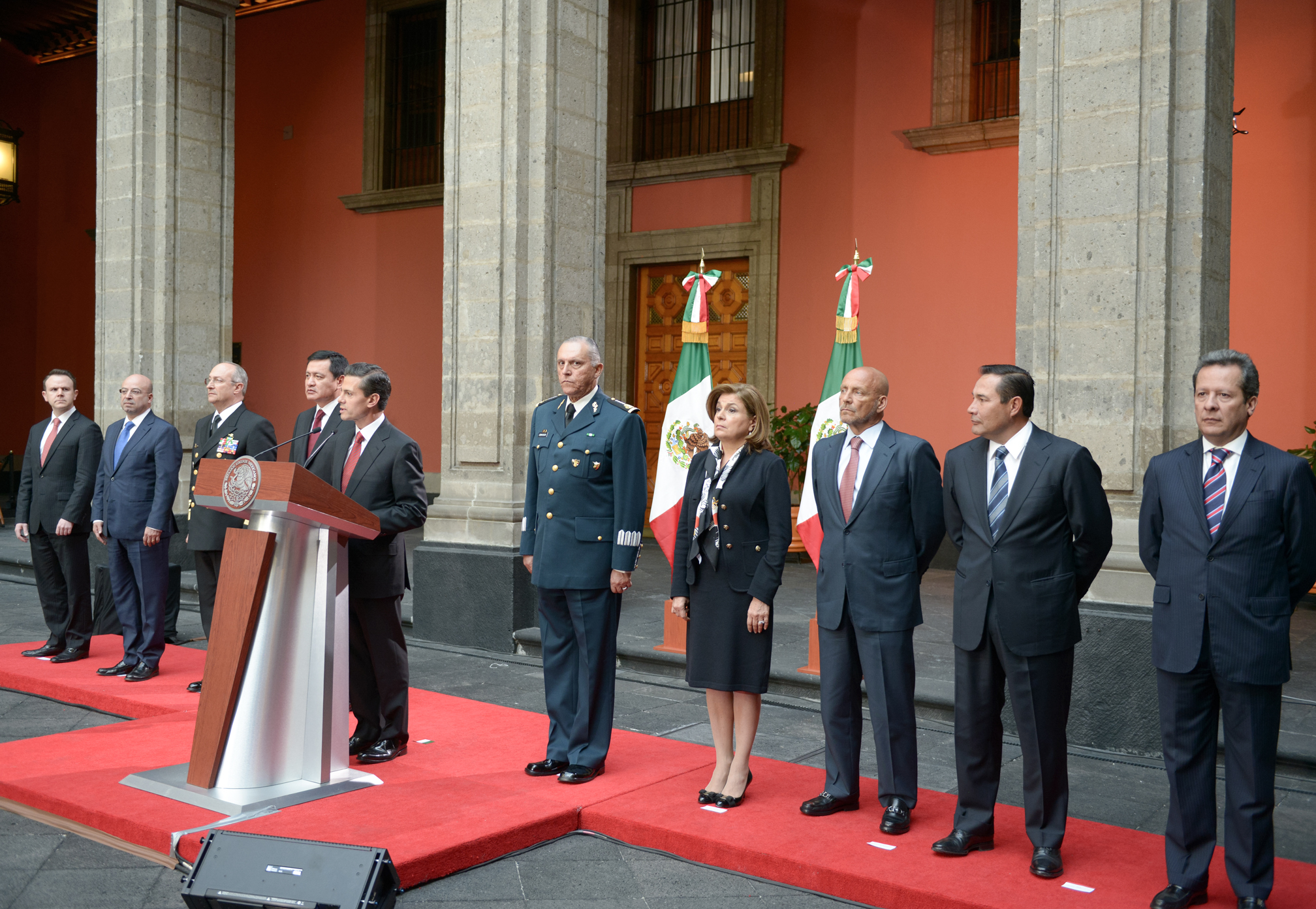
President Enrique Peña Nieto, accompanied by Cabinet members, holds a press conference in the Palacio Nacional announcing the capture of Joaquín Guzmán

In 2012, newly elected President Enrique Peña Nieto, from the PRI, emphasized that he did not support the involvement of armed American agents in Mexico and was only interested in training Mexican forces in counter-insurgency tactics. At the start of his term, Peña Nieto promised to de-escalate the conflict, focusing on lowering criminal violence rates, as opposed to the previous policy of attacking drug-trafficking organizations by arresting or killing the cartel leaders and intercepting their shipments. His administration's security policy was shaped by Miguel Ángel Osorio Chong (Secretary of the Interior), Jesús Murillo Karam (Attorney General), and Salvador Cienfuegos (National Defense). In the first 14 months of his administration, between December 2012 and January 2014, 23,640 people died in the conflict.

During 2012 and 2013, Mexico saw the rise of grupos de autodefensa comunitaria, vigilante self-defense groups in rural communities that took up arms against criminal groups that wanted to impose dominance in their towns, entering a new phase in the Mexican drug war. This strategy, encouraged by Óscar Naranjo, one of Peña Nieto's security advisors, crumbled when autodefensas began having internal struggles and disagreements with the government, as well as infiltration and co-optation by organized crime, causing Peña Nieto's administration to distance from them.

The 2014 Iguala mass kidnapping, in which 43 students from the Ayotzinapa Rural Teachers' College disappeared after being detained by local police and allegedly handed over to a criminal group, became a flashpoint in Peña Nieto's administration. The government's investigation, which international forensic experts later discredited, provoked national and international condemnation and stressed the entanglement between authorities and organized crime.

In 2015, cartel leader Joaquín "El Chapo" Guzmán escaped from Mexico's maximum-security Altiplano prison through a mile-long tunnel equipped with lighting, ventilation, and a rail-mounted motorcycle. After six months on the run, he was recaptured in Los Mochis, Sinaloa, following a military raid. Guzmán was extradited to the United States in 2017, where he was convicted on multiple charges and sentenced to life imprisonment.

A centerpiece of Peña Nieto's strategy consisted of making the Mexican Interior Ministry solely responsible for public security and the creation of a national military-level police force called the National Gendarmederie. In 2017, the Law of Internal Security, which sought to formalize the military's presence in civilian law enforcement, was passed by the legislature but faced significant criticism for undermining civil liberties and was ultimately derogated by the Supreme Court a year later.

=== Andrés Manuel López Obrador ===
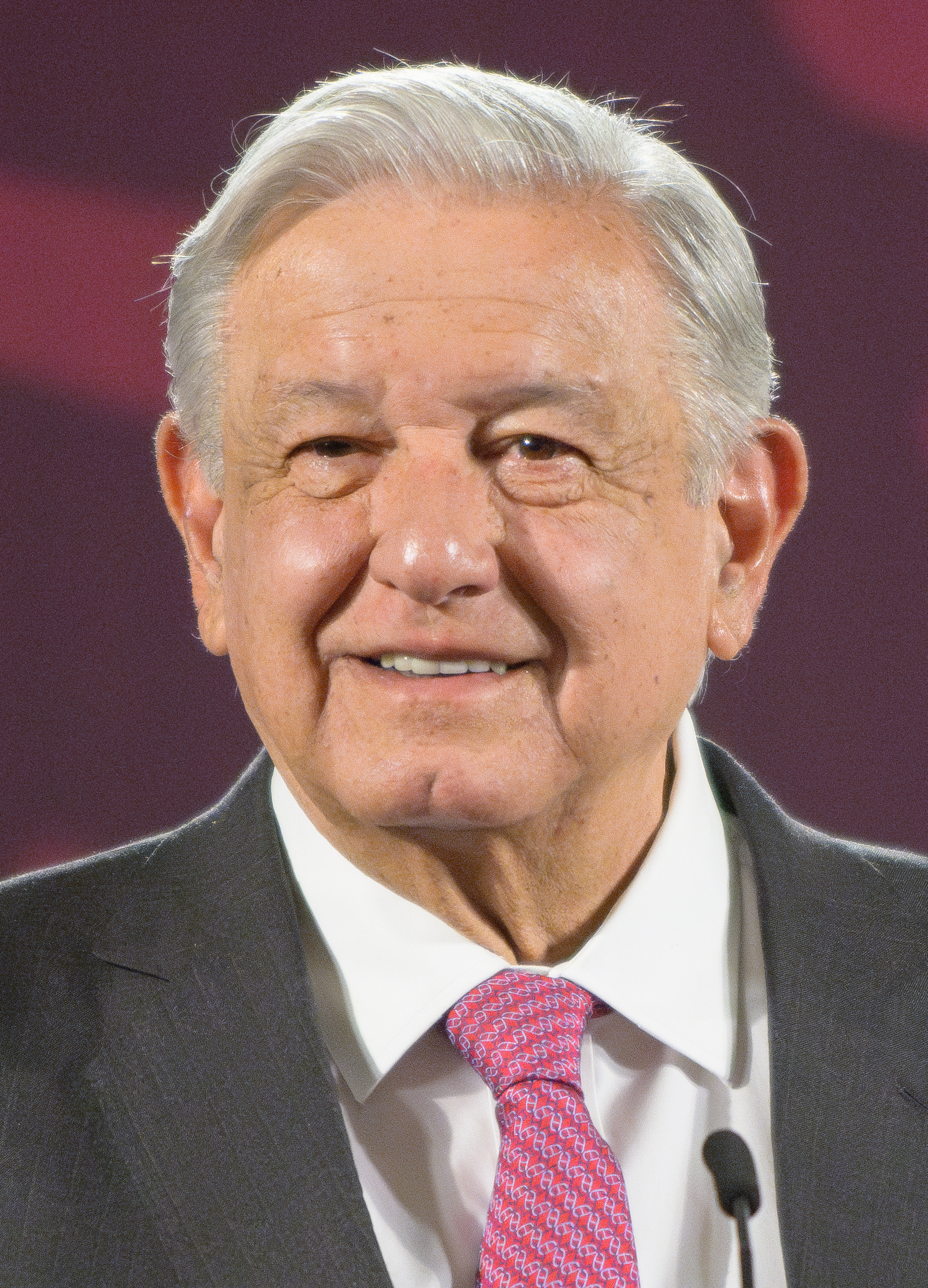
President Andrés Manuel López Obrador

Andrés Manuel López Obrador, of the left-wing Morena party, took office in 2018. One of his campaign promises was to grant amnesty to Mexicans coerced into drug production and trafficking. His administration stressed that this would not apply to cartel members, but to poor farmers, coerced laborers, and young people jailed for drug possession. López Obrador argued that previous strategies ignored social inequalities and left communities vulnerable. His strategy was described with the phrase "Abrazos, no balazos" ('hugs, not bullets'), emphasizing welfare spending, scholarships, and youth employment programs, with security policy directed by Rosa Icela Rodríguez (Secretariat of Security and Civilian Protection), Alejandro Gertz Manero (Attorney General), and Luis Cresencio Sandoval (National Defense).

In January 2019, López Obrador declared "the end of the Mexican war on drugs", stating that his administration would focus on reducing spending and direct its military and police efforts primarily on stopping oil theft rings—locally called huachicoleros—that targeted the Mexican state-owned company Pemex. In May 2019, the Mexican National Guard was created, merging units of the Federal Police, military police, Navy, the Chief of Staff's Guard, and other security agencies. While initially envisioned as a civilian-led force, it was eventually placed under the control of the Secretariat of National Defense (SEDENA), which triggered criticism for continuing military deployment despite López Obrador's pledge to withdraw the Army from the streets.

Drug-related violence remained at previous levels during the first months of López Obrador's presidency. In October 2019, a National Guard operation in Culiacán, Sinaloa to capture Ovidio Guzmán López, responding to a U.S. extradition request, failed after cartel gunmen took hostages and forced his release. Guzmán was released after approximately 700 cartel enforcers took multiple hostages, including the housing unit where military families live in Culiacán. López Obrador defended the decision to release Guzmán López, arguing it prevented further loss of life, and insisted that he wanted to avoid more massacres, and that even though they underestimated the cartel's forces and ability to respond, the criminal process against Ovidio is still ongoing. Guzmán López was captured in a 2023 operation and extradited to the U.S.

The strategy of avoiding armed confrontations while drug organizations have continued violent altercations has been controversial. The Jalisco New Generation Cartel (CJNG) expanded aggressively during López Obrador's presidency, and its territorial disputes were linked to significant increases in homicide rates in Colima, Zacatecas, Guanajuato, and Jalisco. In July 2022, authorities captured Rafael Caro-Quintero, a former leader of the Guadalajara Cartel.

Despite his campaign promises, military deployments and expenditures have risen, with troop levels 76% higher and defense spending up 87% between 2012 and 2022. While deployments expanded, available data indicate a more restrained operational role, with fewer confrontations and seizures, alongside new duties such as infrastructure projects and vaccine distribution. Under U.S. pressure, the National Guard has been increasingly deployed to stem migrant flows from Central America.

=== Claudia Sheinbaum ===
Claudia Sheinbaum has pledged continuity with López Obrador's security strategy. She appointed Omar García Harfuch to the Secretariat of Security and Civilian Protection (SSPC). Under her administration, the SSPC's powers were expanded through legislation that facilitated closer collaboration with the Attorney General's Office, and greater intelligence gathering and sharing across government agencies.

Her government also led targeted operations against cartel infighting, and a greater use of surveillance technology. Nemesio Oseguera Cervantes, the leader of the Jalisco New Generation Cartel, was killed by Mexican Army during the 2026 Jalisco operation on February 22, triggering widespread retaliatory violence and travel disruptions as the 2026 Mexico cartel unrest as due to the absence of leadership and ability of hardliners to push the state to a brink.

== Mexican cartels ==
Map of Mexican cartel headquarters

=== Origins ===
The birth of most Mexican drug cartels is traced to former Mexican Judicial Federal Police agent Miguel Ángel Félix Gallardo (Spanish: El Padrino, lit. 'The Godfather'), who founded the Guadalajara Cartel in 1980 and controlled most of the illegal drug trade in Mexico and the trafficking corridors across the Mexico–U.S. border along with Juan García Ábrego throughout the 1980s. He started by smuggling marijuana and opium into the U.S., and was the first Mexican drug chief to link up with Colombia's cocaine cartels in the 1980s. Through his connections, Félix Gallardo became the person at the forefront of the Medellín Cartel, which was run by Pablo Escobar. This was accomplished because Félix Gallardo had already established a marijuana trafficking infrastructure that stood ready to serve the Colombia-based cocaine traffickers.

There were no other cartels at that time in Mexico. He oversaw operations with his cronies and the politicians who sold him protection. The Guadalajara Cartel suffered a major blow in 1985 when the group's co-founder Rafael Caro Quintero was captured, and later convicted, for the murder of DEA agent Enrique "Kiki" Camarena. Félix Gallardo then kept a low profile and in 1987 he moved with his family to Guadalajara. According to Peter Dale Scott, the Guadalajara Cartel prospered largely because it enjoyed the protection of the Dirección Federal de Seguridad (DFS), under its chief Miguel Nazar Haro.

Félix Gallardo was arrested on April 8, 1989. He then divested the trade he controlled, as it would be more efficient and less likely to be brought down in one law enforcement swoop. He sent his lawyer to convene the nation's top drug traffickers at a house in Acapulco where he designated plazas or territories.

The Tijuana route would go to his nephews, the Arellano Felix brothers. The Ciudad Juárez route would go to the Carrillo Fuentes family. Miguel Caro Quintero would run the Sonora corridor. Meanwhile, Joaquín Guzmán Loera and Ismael Zambada García would take over Pacific coast operations, becoming the Sinaloa Cartel. Guzmán and Zambada brought veteran Héctor Luis Palma Salazar back into the fold. The control of the Matamoros, Tamaulipas corridor—then becoming the Gulf Cartel—would be left undisturbed to its founder, Juan García Ábrego, who was not a party to the 1989 pact.

Félix Gallardo still planned to oversee national operations, as he maintained important connections, but he would no longer control all details of the business. When he was transferred to a high-security prison in 1993, he lost any remaining control over the other cartel leaders.

=== Major cartels in the war ===
==== Sinaloa Cartel ====
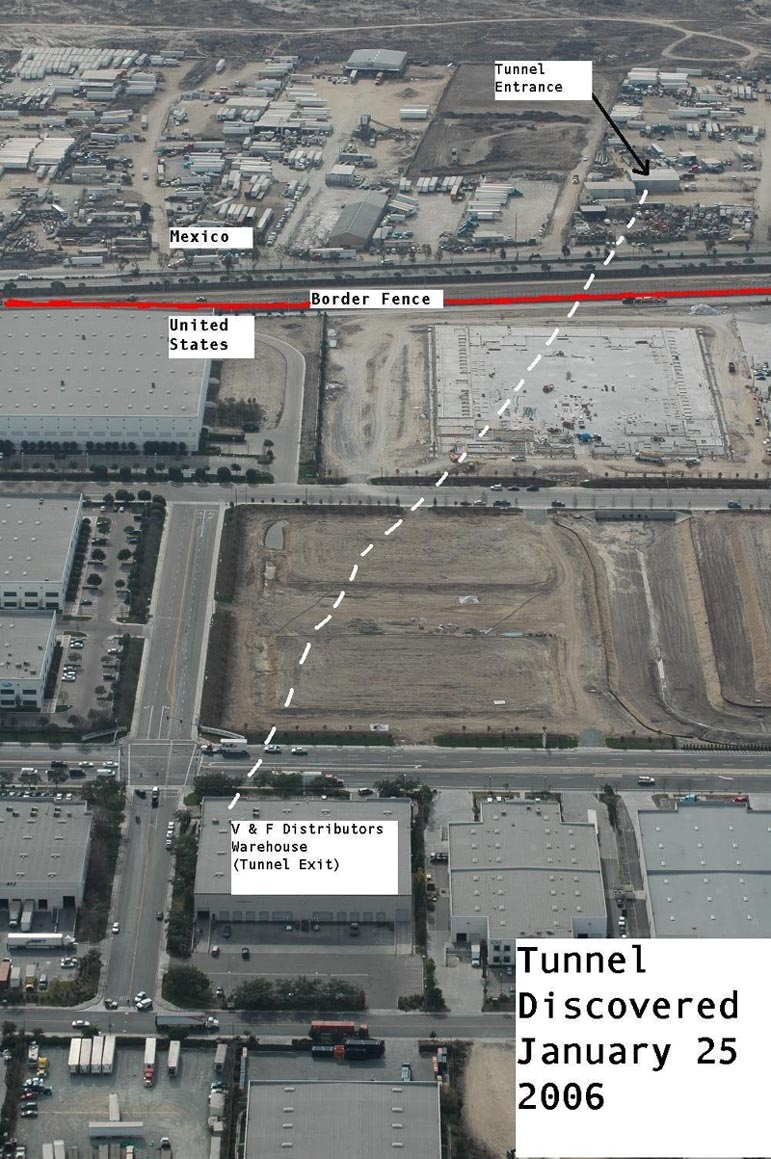
Drug trafficking tunnel under the U.S.-Mexico border from Tijuana to Otay Mesa used by the Sinaloa Cartel

The Sinaloa Cartel began to contest the Gulf Cartel's domination of the southwest Texas corridor following the arrest of Gulf Cartel leader Osiel Cárdenas in March 2003. In 2006, it formalized "the Federation," an alliance of criminal groups in Sinaloa under Joaquín "El Chapo" Guzmán, who became Mexico's most-wanted trafficker, with an estimated net worth of US$1 billion.

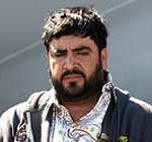
Guzmán's lieutenant Alfredo Beltrán Leyva ("El Mochomo") was arrested in 2008.

Under Guzmán, the Sinaloa Cartel fought the Juárez Cartel in a prolonged battle for control over drug trafficking routes in and around Ciudad Juárez. The battle resulted in defeat for the Juárez Cartel, resulting in the deaths of between 5,000 and 12,000 people. The Sinaloa Cartel used several gangs (e.g. Los Mexicles, the Artistas Asesinos and Gente Nueva) to attack the Juárez Cartel. The Juárez Cartel similarly used gangs such as La Línea and the Barrio Azteca to fight the Sinaloa Cartel. In February 2010, the Federation formed new alliances against Los Zetas and the Beltrán-Leyva Cartel.

Guzmán was arrested and escaped in 2015, re-arrested in 2016, and extradited to the U.S. in 2017. Guzmán claimed that he had paid former presidents Enrique Peña Nieto and Felipe Calderón bribes, which both denied. In 2019, he was convicted of drug trafficking and sentenced to life imprisonment, after which Ismael "El Mayo" Zambada emerged as the cartel's senior figure. Zambada was arrested in 2024 and extradited to the U.S. in 2025.

In January 2023, the arrest of Guzmán's son Ovidio Guzmán sparked a wave of violence in the state of Sinaloa, with the military deploying aircraft and heavy forces in response. Following the arrests of Guzmán and Zambada, the Sinaloa Cartel has experienced infighting, with rival factions aligning under their respective names.

In February 2026, the U.S. State Department says it will pay up to $10 million for information leading to the arrests or convictions of two brothers identified as leaders of Mexico's Sinaloa cartel in the state of Baja California.

==== Beltrán-Leyva Cartel ====
The Beltrán-Leyva Cartel was founded by the four Beltrán Leyva brothers: Marcos Arturo, Carlos, Alfredo and Héctor. In 2004 and 2005, cartel leader Arturo Beltrán Leyva led groups of enforcers to compete for trafficking routes in northeastern Mexico against the Sinaloa Cartel. The Beltrán-Leyva Cartel infiltrated Mexico's political, judicial, and police institutions, including the Interpol in Mexico, to feed classified information about anti-drug operations against its rivals.

Following the 2009 killing of Arturo Beltrán Leyva, the cartel entered into an internal power struggle between Arturo's brother, Héctor Beltrán Leyva, and his top enforcer Edgar Valdez Villarreal. Meanwhile, the cartel continued to dissolve with factions such as the South Pacific Cartel, La Mano Con Ojos, Independent Cartel of Acapulco, and La Barredora forming and the latter two cartels starting yet another intra-Beltrán Leyva Cartel conflict. The Mexican Federal Police considers the cartel to have been disbanded, and their last leader, Héctor Beltrán Leyva, was captured in October 2014.

==== Juárez Cartel ====
The Juárez Cartel controls one of the primary transportation routes for billions of dollars' worth of illegal drug shipments annually entering the United States from Mexico. Since 2007, the Juárez Cartel has been locked in a vicious battle with its former partner, the Sinaloa Cartel, for control of Ciudad Juárez. La Línea is a group of Mexican drug traffickers and corrupt Juárez and Chihuahua state police officers who work as the armed wing of the Juárez Cartel. Vicente Carrillo Fuentes headed the Juárez Cartel until his arrest in 2014.

Since 2011, the Juárez Cartel has continued to weaken. It is present in the three main points of entry into El Paso, Texas. Its weakness and inability to effectively fight against Sinaloa's advances in Juárez contributed to the lower death toll in Juárez in 2011.

==== Tijuana Cartel ====
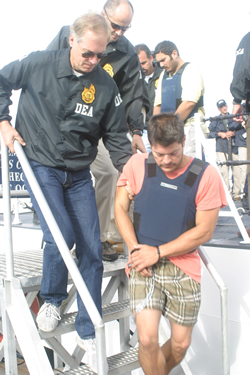
Francisco Javier Arellano Félix, the Tijuana Cartel leader, was captured by the DEA.

The Tijuana Cartel, also known as the Arellano Félix Organization, was once among Mexico's most powerful. It is based in Tijuana, one of the most strategically important border towns in Mexico, and continues to export drugs even after being weakened by an internal war in 2009. Due to infighting, arrests, and the deaths of some of its top members, the Tijuana Cartel is a fraction of what it was in the 1990s and early 2000s. After the arrest or assassination of various members of the Arellano Félix family, the cartel is currently allegedly headed by Edwin Huerta Nuño, alias "El Flako".

==== Gulf Cartel ====
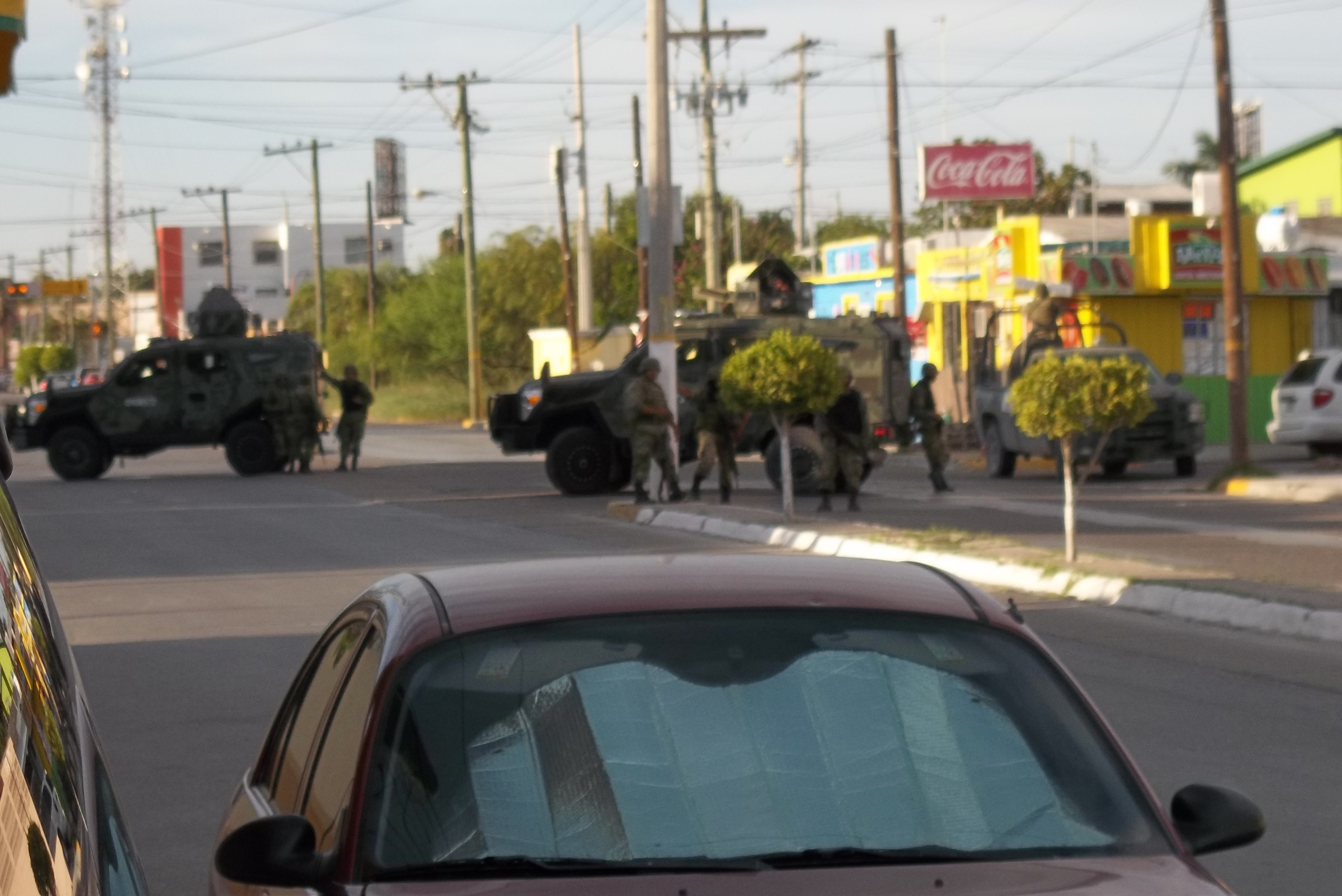
Mexican Army raids a Gulf Cartel's house in Matamoros, Tamaulipas, in 2012

Based in Matamoros, Tamaulipas, the Gulf Cartel (CDG) (Spanish: Cártel del Golfo) has long been one of Mexico's dominant criminal organizations. Its former arrangement with their armed wing, Los Zetas, collapsed in 2010, and both groups engaged in widespread violence across several border cities of Tamaulipas state, turning several border towns into "ghost towns".

The CDG held off several Los Zetas incursions into its territory. However, by 2011, internal divisions led to intra-cartel battles in Matamoros and Reynosa. Infighting in the Gulf Cartel resulted in several arrests and deaths in Mexico and in the United States. The CDG has since broken apart, and it appears that one of its factions, known as Los Metros, has overpowered its rival, Los Rojos, and is now asserting its control over CDG operations. The Mexican federal government captured several leaders of the CDG during Joint Operation Nuevo León-Tamaulipas. Osiel Cárdenas Guillén, his brothers Antonio Cárdenas Guillén, Mario Cárdenas Guillén, and Jorge Eduardo Costilla Sánchez were captured and incarcerated during Felipe Calderón's administration.

==== Los Zetas ====
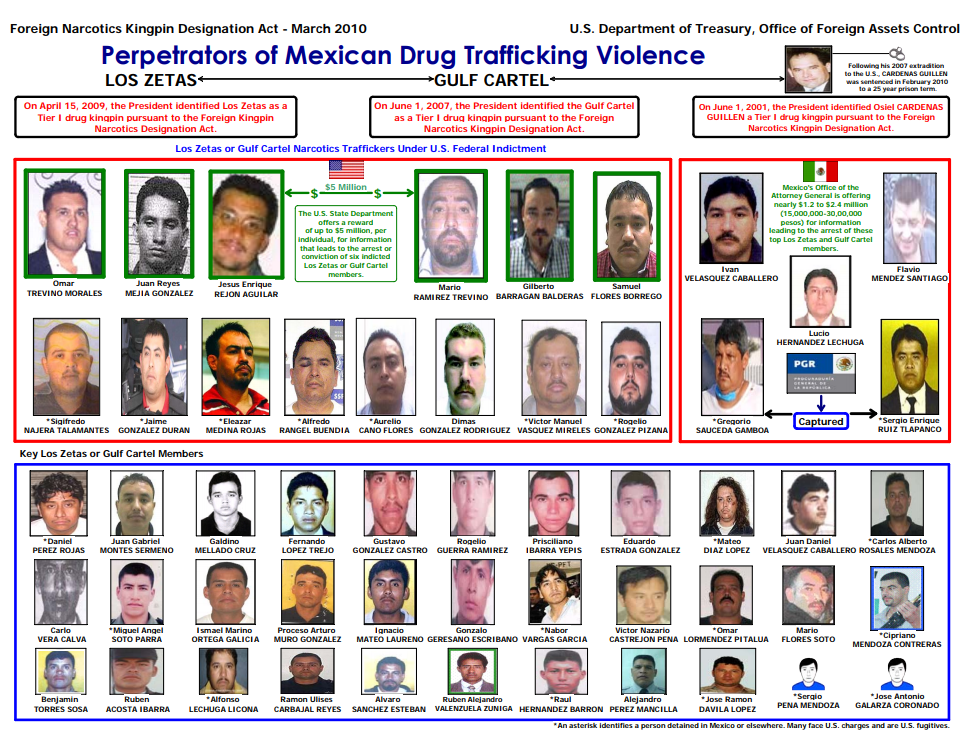
Leadership chart of the Gulf Cartel and Los Zetas issued by the U.S. Department of the Treasury, March 2010

Los Zetas originated in 1999, when Gulf Cartel leader Osiel Cárdenas Guillén recruited 37 former elite soldiers from Mexico's special forces to serve as his armed wing. Known as Los Zetas, they operated as the cartel's private army and played a central role in its dominance of the drug trade in the early 2000s.

After Cárdenas Guillén's 2007 arrest and extradition, Los Zetas broke away under Heriberto Lazcano, building independent networks in drug, arms, and human trafficking. By 2008, they had allied with the Beltrán Leyva brothers, turning against their former partners, the Gulf Cartel. In 2010, the split became open war, with Los Zetas and the Gulf Cartel fighting for control of routes in northeast Mexico, which resulted in thousands of deaths. In July 2013, the Mexican Navy arrested leader Miguel Treviño Morales.

Los Zetas are notorious for targeting civilians, including the mass murder of 72 migrants in the San Fernando massacre. Their activities extended beyond narcotics and have also been connected to human trafficking, oil theft from pipelines, extortion, and digital piracy. Their criminal network is said to reach far from Mexico, including into Central America, the U.S., and Europe.

In recent times, Los Zetas have undergone fragmentation and infighting and seen a decline in their influence. By the late 2010s, the group had fragmented into rival factions such as Sangre Nueva Zeta and Zetas Vieja Escuela, some of which allied with the Gulf Cartel against the Cártel del Noreste. Remnants of Los Zetas have also operated under the Cártel del Noreste name.

==== La Familia Michoacana Cartel ====
Map of Mexican drug cartels presence in Mexico based on a May 2010 Stratfor report Tijuana Cartel Beltrán-Leyva Cartel Sinaloa Cartel Juárez Cartel La Familia Michoacana Gulf Cartel Los Zetas Disputed territories

La Familia Michoacana was a drug cartel based in Michoacán between at least 2006 and 2011. It was formerly allied with the Gulf Cartel and Los Zetas, but split off to become an independent organization. La Familia Michoacana was the first cartel targeted by President Calderón's security strategy, beginning with Operation Michoacán in December 2006. Between 2009 and 2010, joint U.S.–Mexican operations led to the arrest of hundreds of La Familia members and the reported death of founder Nazario Moreno González ("El Más Loco"). The group soon split between the Knights Templar Cartel and a faction led by José de Jesús Méndez Vargas ("El Chango"), who was arrested in 2011, after which authorities declared La Familia dismantled, leaving the Knights Templar as its de facto successor.

In February 2010, La Familia allied with the Gulf Cartel against Los Zetas and the Beltrán-Leyva Cartel. La Nueva Familia Michoacana emerged from splinters of La Familia in the early 2010s, rebranding while continuing operations in Michoacán and Guerrero, and clashing with the Jalisco New Generation Cartel.

==== Knights Templar ====
The Knights Templar Cartel (Spanish: Caballeros Templarios) was created in Michoacán in 2011 after the presumed death of the leader of La Familia Michoacana, Nazario Moreno González. The cartel was headed by Enrique Plancarte Solís and Servando Gómez Martínez ("La Tuta"), who formed the Knights Templar due to differences with José de Jesús Méndez Vargas, who had assumed leadership of La Familia Michoacana. The cartel was reported to promote a religious doctrine as part of its identity.

Sizable battles flared up in 2011 between the Knights Templar and La Familia. The organization grew from a splinter group to a dominant force in Michoacán, and following the arrest of Méndez Vargas, the cartel appeared to have taken over the bulk of La Familia's operations. In 2011 the Knights Templar appeared to have aligned with the Sinaloa Federation in an effort to root out the remnants of La Familia and to prevent Los Zetas from gaining foothold in the Michoacán region. In 2014 Plancarte Solís was killed by the Mexican Navy, and Gómez Martínez was arrested in 2015. The cartel is believed to have disbanded in 2017.

==== CJNG ====
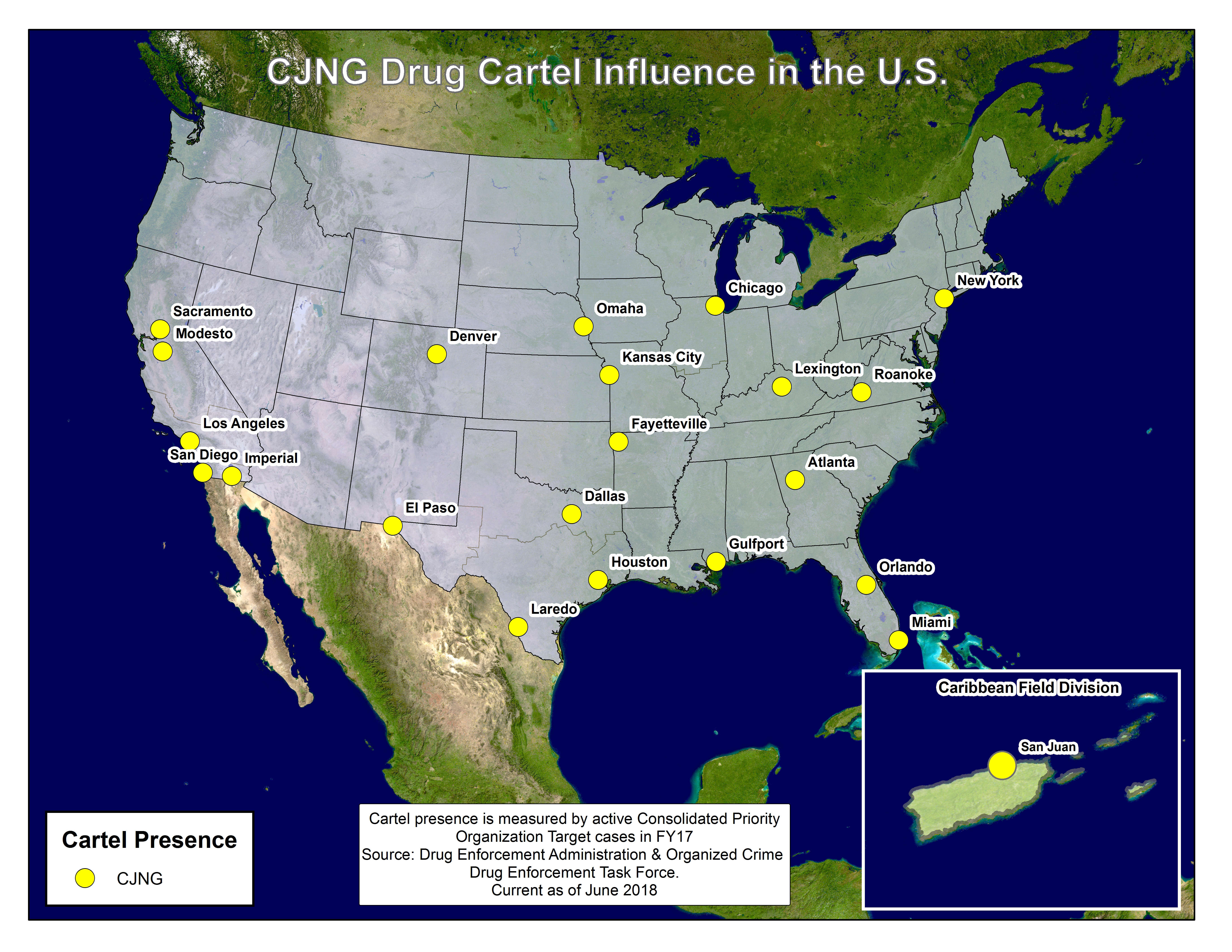
Area of influence map of the Jalisco New Generation Cartel in the United States as of 2017

The Jalisco New Generation Cartel (CJNG) (Spanish: Cártel de Jalisco Nueva Generación) is a Mexican criminal group based in Jalisco and was headed by Nemesio Oseguera Cervantes ("El Mencho"), who was Mexico's most-wanted cartel leader until his death in 2026. The CJNG started as one of the splits of Milenio Cartel, beside La Resistencia. The CJNG defeated La Resistencia and took control of Millenio Cartel's smuggling networks. The cartel expanded its operation network from coast to coast in only six months, making it one of the criminal groups with the greatest operating capacity in Mexico as of 2012.

Through online messaging, the Jalisco New Generation Cartel has tried to seek social approval and tacit consent from the Mexican government to confront Los Zetas by posing as a "righteous" and "nationalist" group. By 2018 the CJNG was claimed to be the most powerful cartel in Mexico, though Insight Crime has said the Sinaloa Cartel is still the most powerful cartel and the CJNG its closest rival. In 2019, the group was weakened by infighting, arrests of senior operatives, and a war with the Sinaloa Cartel and its allies.

=== Cartel affiliates and street gangs ===
Smaller drug cartels and localized street gangs operate across Mexico. These gangs can control retail drug markets, extortion rackets, and serve as enforcers of cartels. In Ciudad Juárez, for example, La Línea, historically allied with the Juárez Cartel, and Los Mexicles, aligned with the Sinaloa Cartel, have been responsible for major spikes of violence, and both groups maintain ties to U.S.-based gangs. In Jalisco and Michoacán, the Jalisco New Generation Cartel has recently allied with gangs such as Los Viagras (a former autodefensa group), to fight for territory and run oil theft operations, despite the two groups having been bitter rivals throughout the 2010s.

While cartels are sometimes portrayed as centralized, hierarchical organizations, they often function more as loose networks of cells and affiliates that can shift loyalties or rebrand over time. This structure can make them resilient, but it also fuels infighting and fragmentation, contributing to persistent and unpredictable violence even when leaders are captured. Even long-standing cartels have experienced prolonged, violent internal disputes, such as the Sinaloa Cartel infighting in the 2020s.

=== Paramilitaries and other sources of income ===
Beyond drug trafficking, Mexican cartels derive revenue from activities including extortion, kidnapping, oil theft from pipelines, human smuggling, illegal mining and logging, arms trafficking, sex trafficking, and protection rackets in territories under their control. The fragmentation of larger cartels into regional groups has extended their operations beyond traditional strongholds in Michoacán, Guerrero, and Northern Mexico, with organized crime now present in nearly every Mexican state.

Paramilitary groups work alongside cartels to enforce these activities. It has been suggested that the rise in paramilitary groups coincides with a loss of security within the government. These paramilitary groups came about in a number of ways. First, waves of elite armed forces and government security experts have left the government to join the side of the cartels, responding to large bribes. Some of the elite armed forces members who join paramilitaries are trained in the Western Hemisphere Institute for Security Cooperation (WHINSEC, formerly known as the School of the Americas). One theory suggests that paramilitaries have emerged from the deregulation of the Mexican army, which private security firms have gradually replaced.

=== Cartel propaganda and messaging ===
Drug cartels in Mexico are heavily involved in public relations and information warfare, employing tools such as food handouts, social media accounts, press release-style videos, narco corridos, and group chats through private messaging platforms primarily WhatsApp and Telegram. Cartel propaganda seeks to influence public opinion, threaten or discredit rivals, and coordinate between organizations. Physical "narco messages", ranging from printed banners to handwritten notes, are often displayed in public spaces or left at crime scenes. Some groups, notably the Jalisco New Generation Cartel (CJNG), maintain dedicated propaganda arms producing coordinated messages with logos, slogans, and professional formatting. Propaganda is also directed at cartel members themselves, with organizations such as La Familia Michoacana and the Knights Templar promoting religious, mythologizing narratives to reinforce loyalty. In 2011, President Felipe Calderón met with major media outlets, urging them to reduce sensationalist coverage and limit the dissemination of cartel messaging. Many cartels tacitly control local information environments by threatening journalists, bloggers, and others who speak out against them.

In recent years, cartel messaging has moved into social media short-form videos and imagery that glamorize cartel life, weapons, and loyalty. Cartel slang is increasingly echoed in popular culture, blurring between criminal identity signifiers and everyday Mexican Spanish. Some journalists and researchers have used the term narcoculture to describe this blend of subcultural references, while others have criticized the label as sensationalistic, noting that cartel recruitment also relies heavily on coercion, patronage networks, and legal businesses. The concept nonetheless points to how cultural symbols and narratives can help cartels normalize their presence and project power.

== Socioeconomic and structural factors ==
=== Government corruption ===
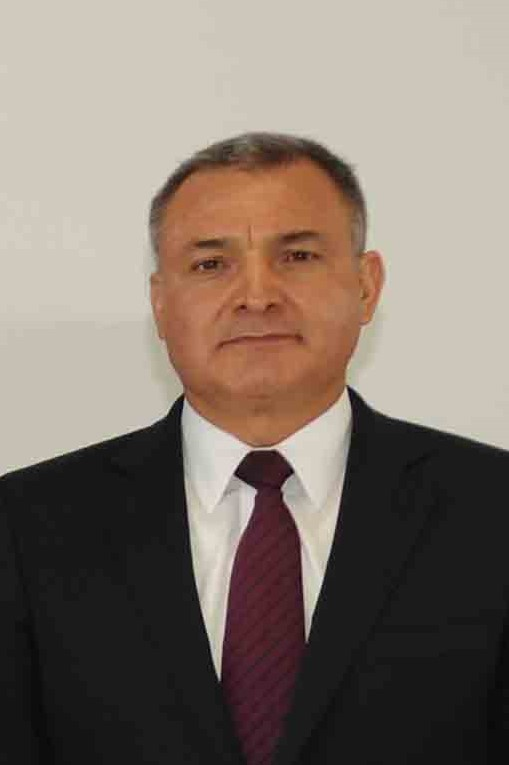
Former Secretary of Public Security Genaro García Luna was found guilty on multiple charges related to corruption and drug trafficking. He is the highest-ranking Mexican official ever to be convicted in the United States.

Mexican cartels advance their operations, in part, by corrupting or intimidating law enforcement officials. Mexican municipal, state, and federal government officials, along with the police forces, often work together with the cartels in an organized network of corruption. A Pax Mafioso is a specific example of corruption that guarantees a politician votes and a following in exchange for not impeding a particular cartel.

The International Narcotics Control Board (INCB) reports that although the central government of Mexico has made concerted efforts to reduce corruption in recent years, it remains a serious problem. Agents of the now-defunct Federal Investigations Agency (AFI) were believed to work as enforcers for various cartels. The Attorney General (PGR) reported in December 2005 that nearly 1,500 of AFI's 7,000 agents were under investigation for suspected criminal activity and 457 were facing charges.

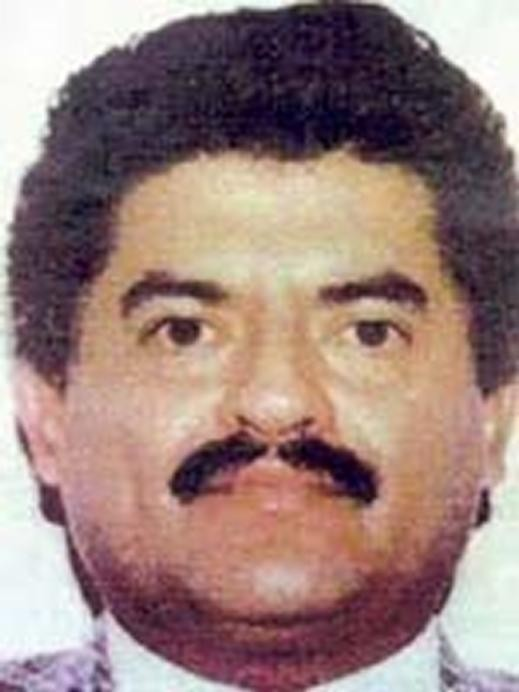
El Azul was a Sinaloa Cartel leader. He was a former Dirección Federal de Seguridad (DFS) agent.

In recent years, the federal government conducted purges and prosecutions of police forces in Nuevo Laredo, Michoacán, Baja California, and Mexico City. The anti-cartel operations begun by President Calderón in December 2006 include ballistic checks of police weapons in places where there is concern that police are also working for the cartels. In June 2007, President Calderón purged 284 federal police commanders from all 31 states and the Federal District.

Under the 'Cleanup Operation' performed in 2008, several agents and high-ranking officials have been arrested and charged with selling information or protection to drug cartels; some high-profile arrests were: Victor Gerardo Garay Cadena, (chief of the Federal Police), Noé Ramírez Mandujano (ex-chief of the Organized Crime Division (SEIDO)), José Luis Santiago Vasconcelos (ex-chief of SEIDO), and Ricardo Gutiérrez Vargas who is the ex-director of Mexico's Interpol office. In January 2009, Rodolfo de la Guardia García, ex-director of Mexico's Interpol office, was arrested. Julio César Godoy Toscano, who was elected in July 2009 to the lower house of Congress, was charged with being a top-ranking member of La Familia Michoacana. He is now a fugitive.

In May 2010, an NPR report collected allegations from dozens of sources, including U.S. and Mexican media, Mexican police officials, politicians, academics, and others, that Sinaloa Cartel had infiltrated and corrupted the Mexican federal government and the Mexican military by bribery and other means. The report also stated that the Sinaloa Cartel was colluding with the government to destroy other cartels and protect itself and its leader, "El Chapo" Guzmán. Mexican officials have denied any corruption in the government's treatment of cartels.

=== Law enforcement ===
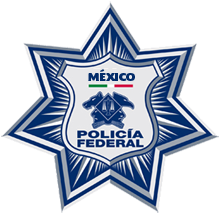
The Mexican Federal Police was formed in 1999 and disbanded in 2019.

Mexico has thousands of municipal police forces, with uneven training, resources, and oversight. Smaller local forces can be easily co-opted by cartels, while state and federal bodies often duplicate or conflict with them. Police departments often depend on mayors or governors for salaries and resources, while governments periodically "purge" police departments by mass firings, then rehiring with little institutional continuity. Federal law enforcement has been reorganized at least five times since 1982, and at least four special forces units have been created.

Internal affairs and civilian oversight of police and military are limited, and whistleblowers risk retaliation. Mexico's public ministry has been criticized for poor case handling, with little forensic work, reliance on forced confessions, and a lack of chain of custody protections, which allow many suspects to be released on technicalities. Cartels have been reported as difficult to prosecute "because members of the cartels have infiltrated and corrupted the law enforcement organizations that are supposed to prosecute them, such as the Office of the Attorney General." Impunity rates for violent crime in Mexico are estimated at between 90 and 95%.

=== Weaponry and equipment ===
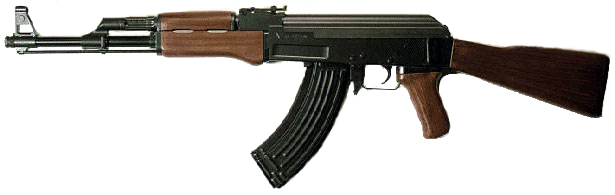
AK-47 (locally called cuerno de chivo, Spanish for "goat horn", for its curved magazine)

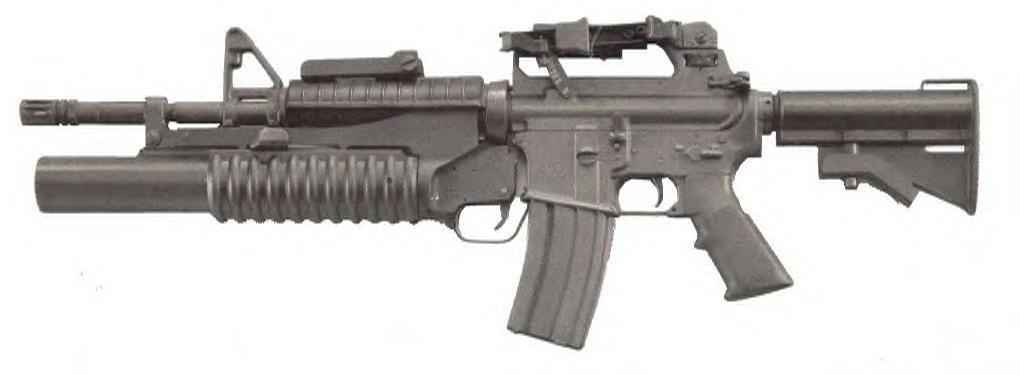
M4 carbine with grenade launcher (locally called chanate, Mexican Spanish for "great-tailed grackle")

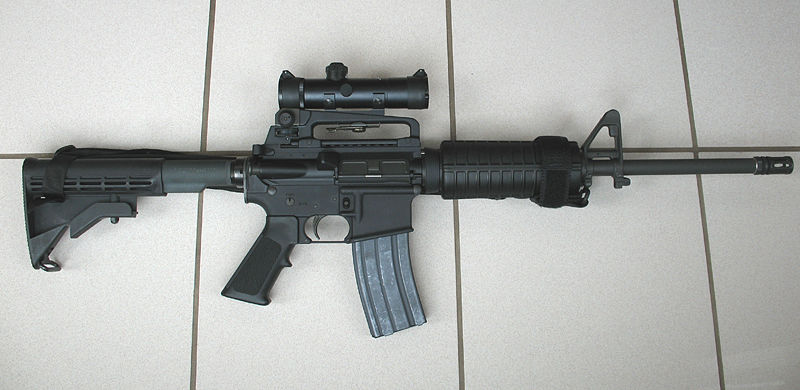
Colt AR-15 A3 tactical carbine

Mexicans have a constitutional right to own firearms, but legal purchase is highly restricted. The most common weapons used by the cartels are the AR-15, M16, M4, AK-47, AKM and Type 56 assault rifles, which are not available for sale in civilian markets. Grenade launchers are known to have been used against Mexican security forces, while H&K G36s and M4 carbines with M203 grenade launchers have been confiscated. Some cartels, such as the Beltrán Leyva Cartel, use counterfeit M16s made with aftermarket parts. Cartels also use body armor, Kevlar helmets, improvised explosive devices, narco-submarines and unmanned aerial vehicles.

Grenades and rocket launchers are often smuggled through the Guatemalan borders, as leftovers from past conflicts in Central America, notably the Salvadoran Civil War and the Nicaraguan Revolution. Some explosive weapons are also smuggled from the U.S. to Mexico or stolen from the Mexican military.

The U.S. Drug Enforcement Administration (DEA) reports that the Mexican drug cartels operating today along the border are far more sophisticated and dangerous than any other organized criminal group in U.S. law enforcement history. Project Gunrunner was a United States Bureau of Alcohol, Tobacco, Firearms and Explosives (ATF) operation aimed at curbing firearms trafficking into Mexico. The project intended to stop the flow of firearms from the United States into Mexico and deny cartels weapons considered 'tools of the trade.'

In 2011, a gunwalking scandal, later known as "Operation Fast and Furious," occurred when the ATF was accused of permitting and facilitating "straw purchase" firearm sales to traffickers, and allowing the guns to "walk" and be transported to Mexico. Allegedly, the ATF allowed to complete the transactions to expose the supply chain and gather intelligence. It has been established that this operation violated long-established ATF policies and practices and that it is not a recognized investigative technique. Several of the guns sold under the Project Gunrunner were recovered from crime scenes in Arizona, and at crime scenes throughout Mexico, resulting in considerable controversy. One notable incident was the "Black Swan operation" where Joaquín Guzmán Loera was finally captured. The ATF confirmed that one of the weapons the Mexican Navy seized from Guzmán's gunmen was one of the many weapons that were "lost" during the Project Gunrunner.

Researchers and Mexican officials have argued that most weapons trafficked into Mexico originate from the United States. The U.S. Department of Homeland Security (DHS) officials have stated that the statistic is misleading: out of approximately 30,000 weapons seized in drug cases in Mexico in 2004–2008, 7,200 appeared to be of U.S. origin, approximately 4,000 were found in ATF manufacturer and importer records, and 87 percent of those—3,480—originated in the United States. The U.S. has continued to assist the Mexican government with technology, equipment, training and intelligence. However, critics argue that gun politics in the United States have exacerbated the conflict by enabling the flow of weapons south of the border.

=== Supply chains ===
Map of Mexican cartels' drug traffic routes in Mexico based on a 2012 Stratfor report

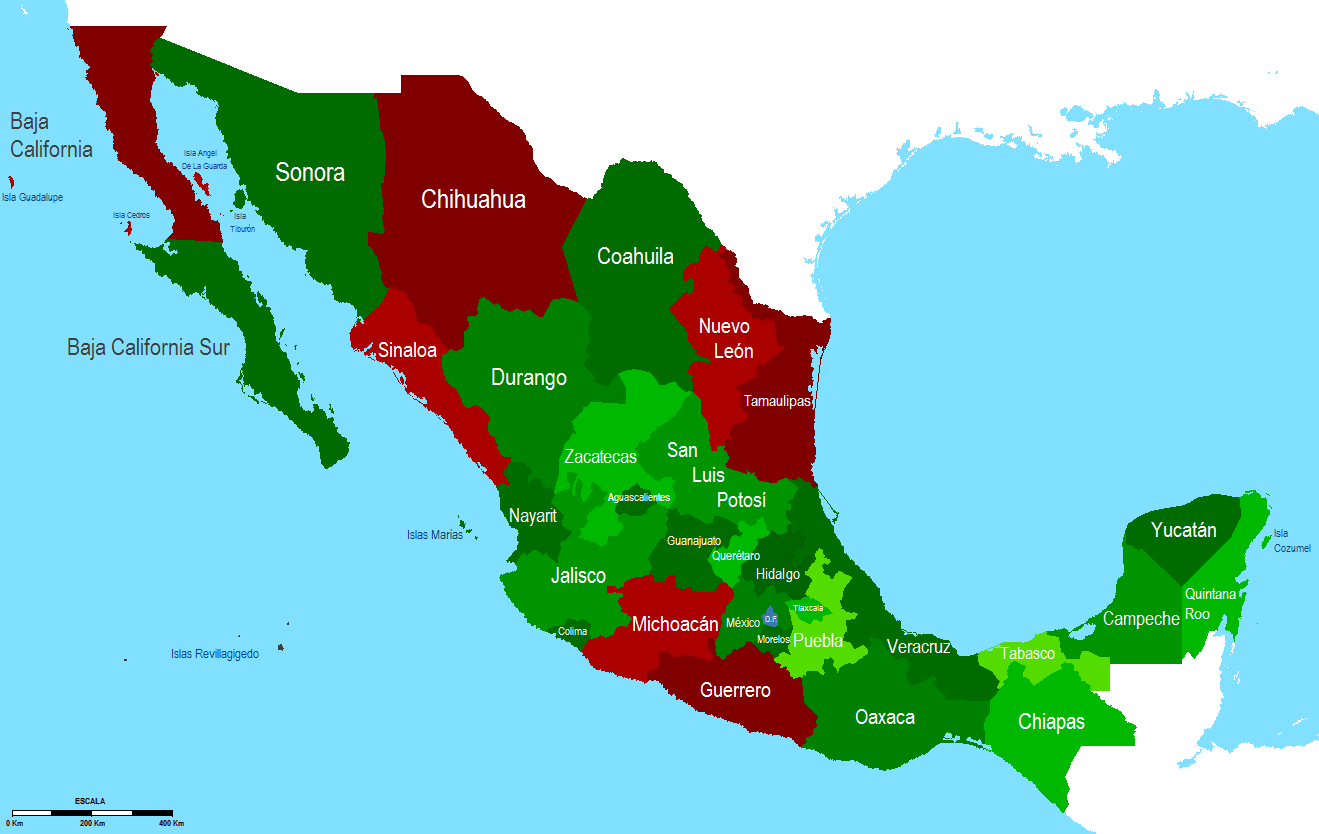
The states where most of the conflict took place in 2010, marked in red

According to the National Drug Intelligence Center, Mexican cartels are the predominant smugglers and wholesale distributors of South American cocaine and Mexico-produced cannabis, methamphetamine, and heroin. The U.S. State Department estimates that 90 percent of cocaine entering the United States is produced in Colombia, followed by Bolivia and Peru, and that the main transit route is through Mexico. Mexican cartels control large swaths of territory, and most of the illegal drugs coming into the U.S., employing land routes, maritime shipments, smuggling tunnels, and other concealment methods. Cartels have waged violent turf battles over control of key smuggling corridors from Matamoros to Tijuana.

Cartels operate clandestine laboratories that process precursor chemicals into synthetic drugs. These chemicals are primarily imported from Asia, especially China and India, and are used to manufacture methamphetamine and fentanyl in large quantities. Since the 2010s, fentanyl has become one of the most profitable components of cartel operations due to its low production cost and high potency.

Although Mexico accounts for only a small share of worldwide heroin production, it supplies a large share of the heroin distributed in the United States. Since the 2000s, Mexican cartels have profited from marijuana cultivation in remote U.S. forests. A 2018 study found that the reduction in drugs from Colombia contributed to Mexican drug violence. The study estimated that "between 2006 and 2009, the decline in cocaine supply from Colombia could account for 10%–14% of the increase in violence in Mexico."

The U.S. has imposed sanctions against cartel members and their front companies. Multilateral cooperation in the International Narcotics Control Board has promoted the regulation of chemical precursors used in the production of synthetic drugs. Cartels have adapted by diversifying their markets and suppliers, expanding beyond the United States, and sourcing chemicals through multiple international channels.

=== Poverty ===
One of the main factors driving the Mexican drug war is widespread poverty. From 2004 to 2008, the portion of the population who received less than half of the median income rose from 17% to 21%, and the proportion of the population living in extreme or moderate poverty rose from 35% to 46% (52 million persons) between 2006 and 2010.

Among the OECD countries, Mexico has the second-highest economic disparity between the extremely poor and the rich. The bottom ten percent in the income hierarchy has 1.36% of the country's resources, whereas the upper ten percent has almost 36%. The OECD also notes that Mexico's budgeted poverty alleviation and social development expenses are only about a third of the OECD average.

In 2012, it was estimated that Mexican cartels employed over 450,000 people directly, and a further 3.2 million people's livelihoods depended on various parts of the drug trade. In cities such as Ciudad Juárez, up to 60% of the economy depended on illegal sources of income. As of 2023, an estimated 175,000 people are working for the cartels. The head of the U.S. Drug Enforcement Administration (DEA) reported that there are an estimated 45,000 members, associates, and brokers spread over more than 100 countries working under the Sinaloa cartel and the Jalisco New Generation cartel.

=== Education ===
A problem that goes hand in hand with poverty in Mexico is the level of schooling. In the 1960s, when Mexican narcotic smugglers started to smuggle drugs on a major scale, only 5.6% of the Mexican population had more than six years of schooling.

More recently, researchers from the World Economic Forum have noted that despite the Mexican economy ranking 31st out of 134 economies for investment in education (5.3% of its GDP), as of 2009, the nation's primary education system is ranked only 116th, thereby suggesting "that the problem is not how much but rather how resources are invested". The WEF further explained: "The powerful teachers union, the SNTE, the largest labor union in Latin America, has been largely responsible for blocking reforms that would increase the quality of spending and help ensure equal access to education."

Teachers in the Acapulco region were "extorted, kidnapped, and intimidated" by cartels, including death threats demanding money. They went on strike in 2011.

== Effects in Mexico ==
=== Casualties ===
Organized crime homicides in Mexico (2007–2016)
Year	Killed
2007	2,774
2008	5,679
2009	8,281
2010	12,658
2011	12,284
2012	12,412
2013	10,094
2014	7,993
2015	8,423
2016	12,224

Casualty numbers have escalated significantly over time. According to a Stratfor report, the number of drug-related deaths in 2006 and 2007 (2,119 and 2,275) more than doubled to 5,207 in 2008. The number further increased substantially over the next two years, from 6,598 in 2009 to over 11,000 in 2010. According to data from the Mexican government, the death numbers are even higher: 9,616 in 2009, 15,273 in 2010, coming to a total of 47,515 killings between 2006 and January 2012.

It is often not clear what deaths are part of the Mexican drug war versus general criminal homicides, and different sources give different estimates. Casualties are often measured indirectly by estimated total deaths from organized crime in Mexico. This amounts to about 115,000 people in the years 2007–2018. From 2018 to 2020, it was estimated that there were 11,400 reports of gang violence, and over 80% of the attacks targeted civilians, resulting in 13,000 related deaths during the period.

=== Violence ===
Count of murders in Mexico's drug conflicts (December 2006 to December 2010)

Although Mexican authorities often distinguish between homicides linked to organized crime and those that are not, the conflict has strained state resources and created an environment of impunity that has worsened crime overall. In 2009, the Mexican attorney general's office claimed that 9 of 10 victims of the Mexican drug war are members of organized crime groups, although other sources have questioned this figure. Deaths among military and police personnel are an estimated 7% of the total. The states that suffer from the conflict the most are Baja California, Guerrero, Chihuahua, Michoacán, Tamaulipas, Nuevo León, and Sinaloa.

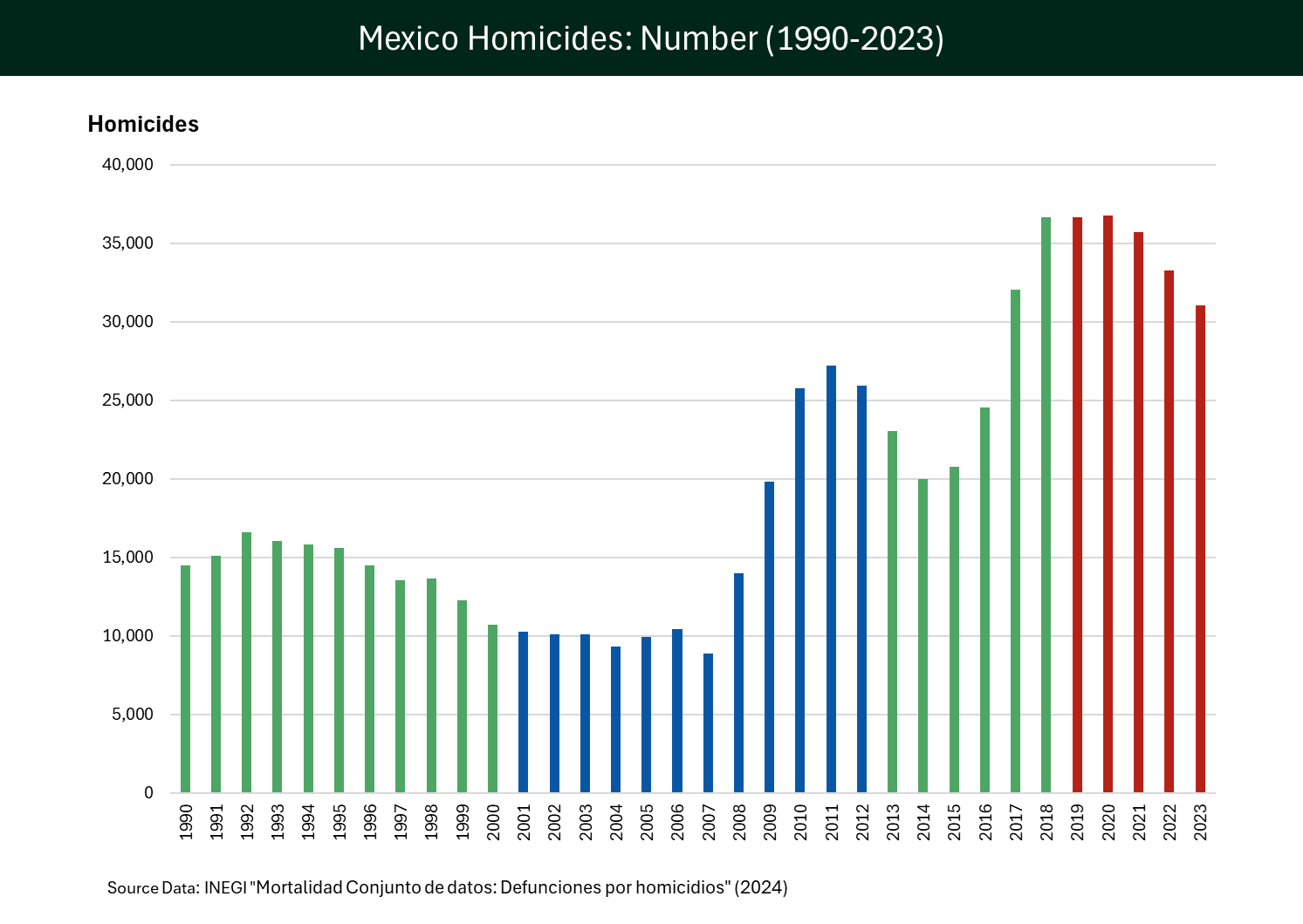
Total homicides in Mexico (1990–2023)

Cartels have used public displays of violence, including videos of executions and street banners, to spread fear and assert control. They have also committed terrorist attacks. The 2008 Morelia grenade attacks killed eight and injured more than 100 civilians celebrating Independence Day. In 2011, Los Zetas carried out an arson attack on the Casino Royale in Monterrey, killing 52 civilians. Some see these efforts as intended to sap the morale of the Mexican government; others see them as an effort to let citizens know who is winning the war. Similarly, at least one dozen Mexican norteño musicians have been murdered. Most of the victims performed narcocorridos, folk songs that tell the stories of the Mexican drug trade.

On July 10, 2008, the Mexican government announced plans to nearly double the size of its Federal Police force to reduce the role of the military in combating drug trafficking.

=== Effects on the economy ===
Beyond its social and political toll, the Mexican drug war has also had significant economic consequences. It has increased costs for businesses, disrupted supply chains, and raised insurance premiums. Small and medium businesses in cartel-dominated areas are affected by widespread extortion, known as piso, while multinational corporations have delayed or reduced investments due to security risks. At the government level, the costs of military deployment and police expansion have represented a growing fiscal burden. Given Mexico's high rates of tax noncompliance, these expenditures have further constrained public finances and limited funding for other essential services. Finance Minister Agustín Carstens said that the deteriorating security alone is reducing gross domestic product annually by 1% in Mexico, Latin America's second-largest economy.

=== Effects on human rights ===
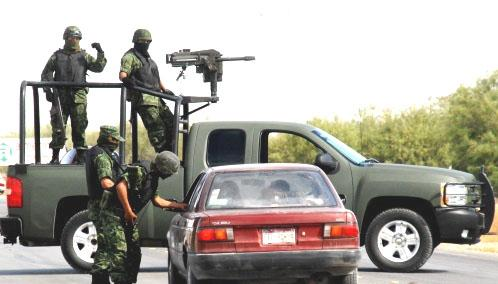
A Mexican Army technical equipped with a Mk 19 grenade launcher at a random checkpoint

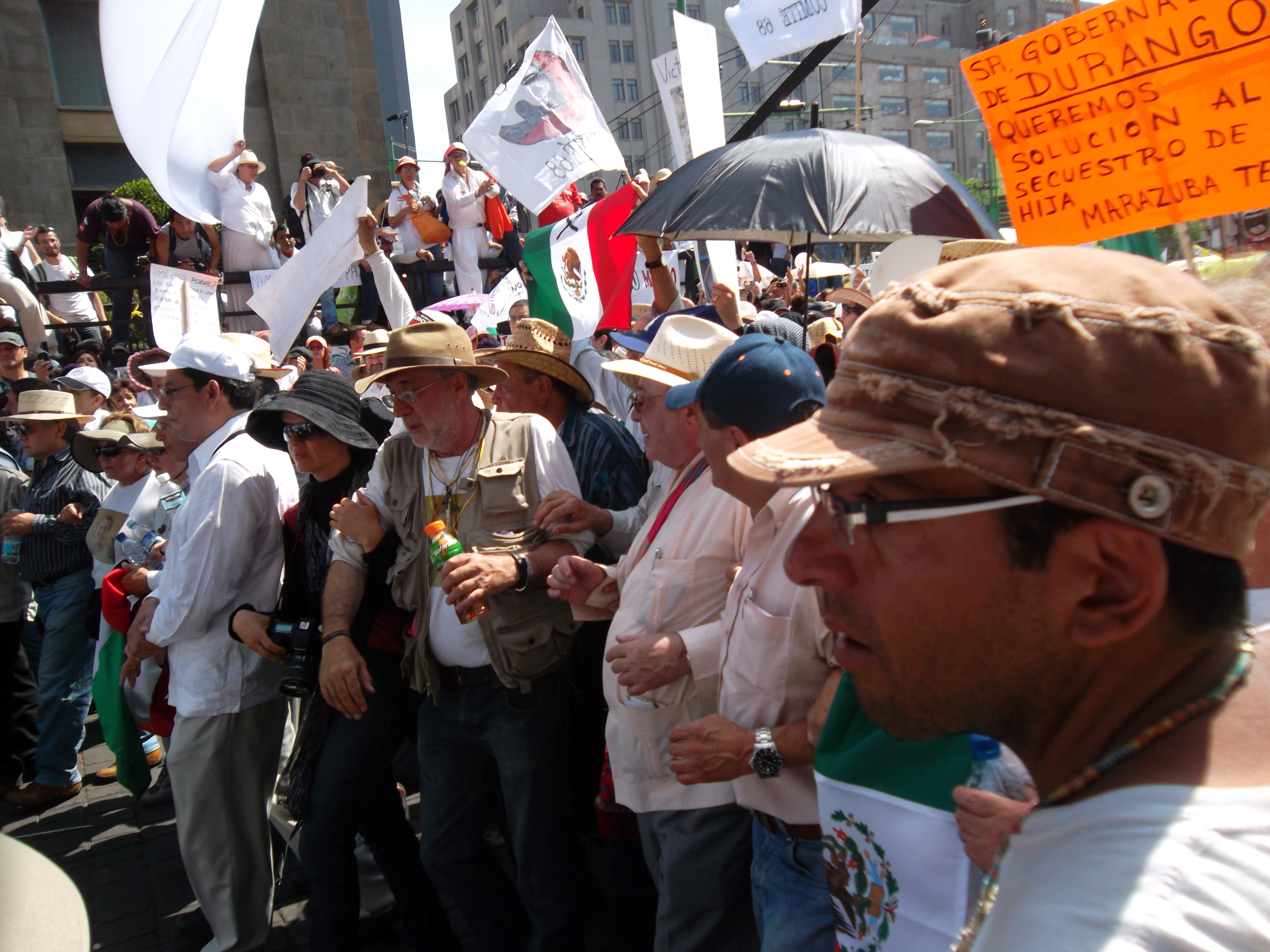
2011 Mexican protests against cartel violence and government disregard

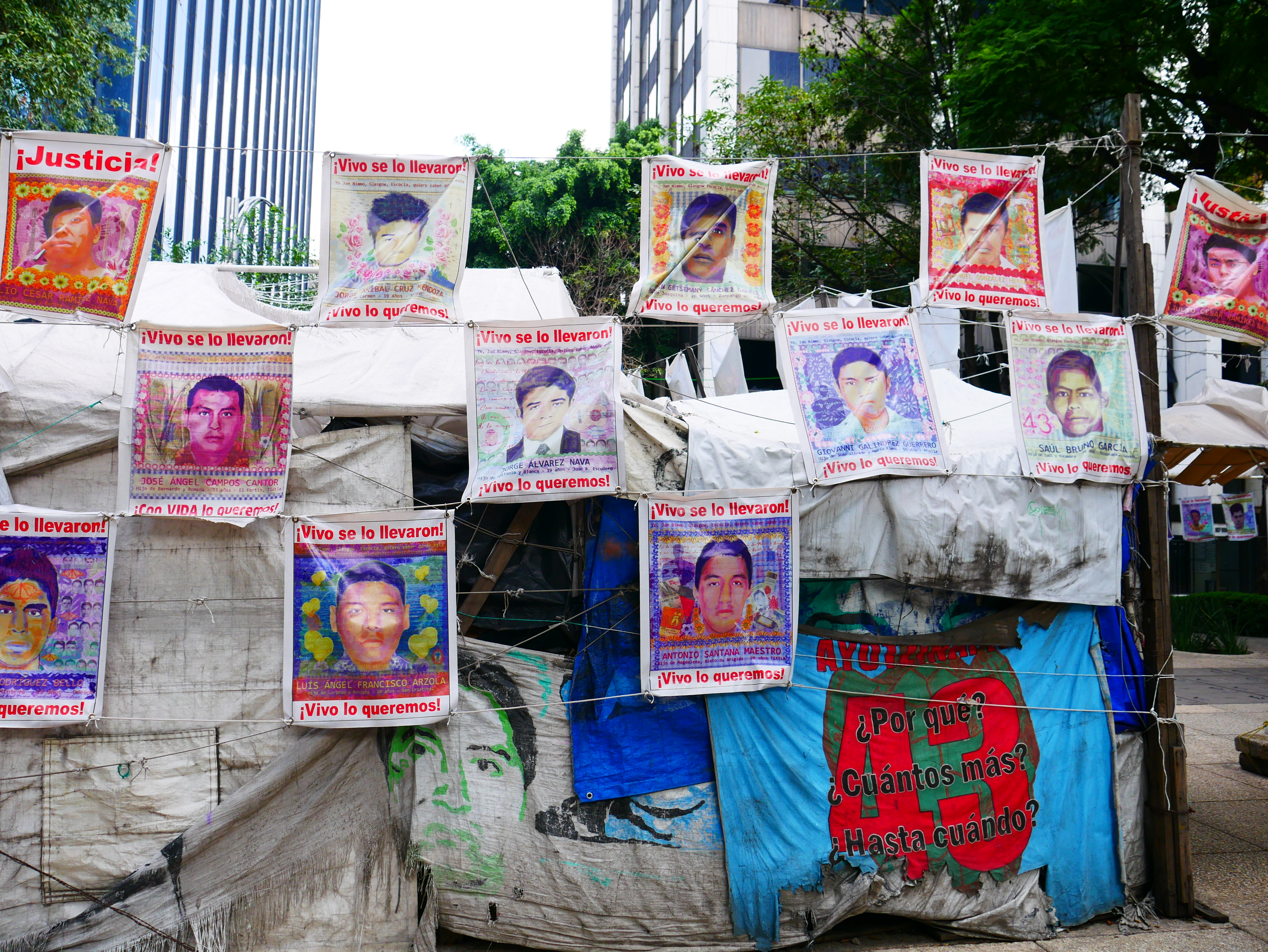
Protest camp on Paseo de la Reforma with portraits of the 43 missing students from the 2014 Iguala mass kidnapping

Since the beginning of the conflict, the military's role in civilian law enforcement has been a subject of controversy. Article 129 of the Mexican Constitution states that, in times of peace, the armed forces can only perform functions that are strictly connected to military discipline. Calderón justified their deployment under his constitutional role as commander-in-chief of the Mexican Armed Forces (Article 89, Section VI), but this interpretation has been criticized for circumventing constitutional limits on military authority. Efforts to formalize this role, such as Peña Nieto's 2017 Internal Security Law, and López Obrador's 2022 transfer of the National Guard to SEDENA, were struck down by the Supreme Court, though in practice the deployments have continued under executive decrees, and in the case of López Obrador, constitutional amendments.

Concentration of power in the executive branch, along with corruption in the legislature and judiciary, has been linked to the deterioration of Mexico's human rights situation. Problems include police abuses such as torture and threats, the autonomy of the military and its consequences, and the ineffectiveness of the judiciary in upholding and preserving human rights. Some forms of human rights violations by Mexican authorities include illegal arrests, secret and indefinite detention, torture, rape, extrajudicial execution, and fabrication of evidence. Federal agencies active in the conflict, such as the now-defunct Federal Investigative Agency (AFI), were also criticized for abuses; in one case, a detainee died in custody, and an implicated agent later escaped while on bail. The AFI, associated with multiple corruption and detainee torture cases, was declared a failure and disbanded in 2009.

Some groups are especially vulnerable to human rights abuses collateral to drug law enforcement. Specifically in northern border states that have seen elevated levels of drug-related violence, human rights violations of injection drug users (IDUs) and sex workers by law enforcement personnel include physical and sexual violence, extortion, and targeting for accessing or possession of injection equipment or practicing sex work, although these activities are legal. Ethnic prejudices have also emerged in the drug war, and indigenous communities have been targeted by the police, military, drug traffickers, and the justice system. According to the Mexican National Human Rights Commission, nearly one-third of the indigenous prisoners in Mexico in 2001 were in prison for federal crimes, which are mostly drug-related. Such targeting is especially deleterious because members of these marginalized communities often lack the resources to enforce their rights.

Another major concern is the lack of implementation of the Leahy Law in the U.S. and the consequences of that in worsening the human rights situation in Mexico. Critics have argued that U.S. assistance to Mexican security forces has conflicted with the Leahy Law, which prohibits aid to units implicated in human rights abuses, pointing to cases where trained units were later accused of violations.

=== Effects on public health ===
"The social fabric is so destroyed that it cannot be healed in one generation or two because wounds become deeply embedded...Mexico has a humanitarian tragedy and we have not grasped how big it is."—Elena Azaola, Centre for Social Anthropology High Studies and Research

Illicit drug use in Mexico is low compared to the United States, but it is on the rise, with the availability of narcotics gradually increasing since the 1980s. The export rate of cocaine to the US decreased following stricter border control measures in response to the September 11 attacks. Drug shipments are often delayed in Mexican border towns before delivery to the U.S., which has forced drug traffickers to increase prices to account for transportation costs. These delays have contributed to the increased rates of local drug consumption. As a result of "spillover" along the U.S.-bound drug trafficking routes and more stringent border enforcement, Mexico's northern border states have seen increased levels of drug consumption and abuse, including elevated rates of drug injection, up to 10 to 15 times the national average.

These rates are accompanied by mounting rates of HIV and STIs among injection drug users (IDUs) and sex workers, reaching a 5.5% prevalence in cities such as Tijuana and Ciudad Juárez, which also report STI rates of 64% and 83%, respectively. Violence and extortion of IDUs and sex workers directly and indirectly elevate the levels of risk behavior and poor health outcomes among members of these groups. Marginalization of these vulnerable groups by way of physical and sexual violence and extortion by police threatens the cross-over of infection from high-prevalence groups to the general population. In particular, decreased access to public health services such as syringe exchange programs and confiscation of syringes can precipitate a cascade of health harms. Geographic diffusion of epidemics from the northern border states elsewhere is also possible with the rotation of police and military personnel stationed in drug conflict areas with high infection prevalence. With increased drug use, there has been a parallel rise in demand for drug user treatment in Mexico.

=== Effects on Women ===
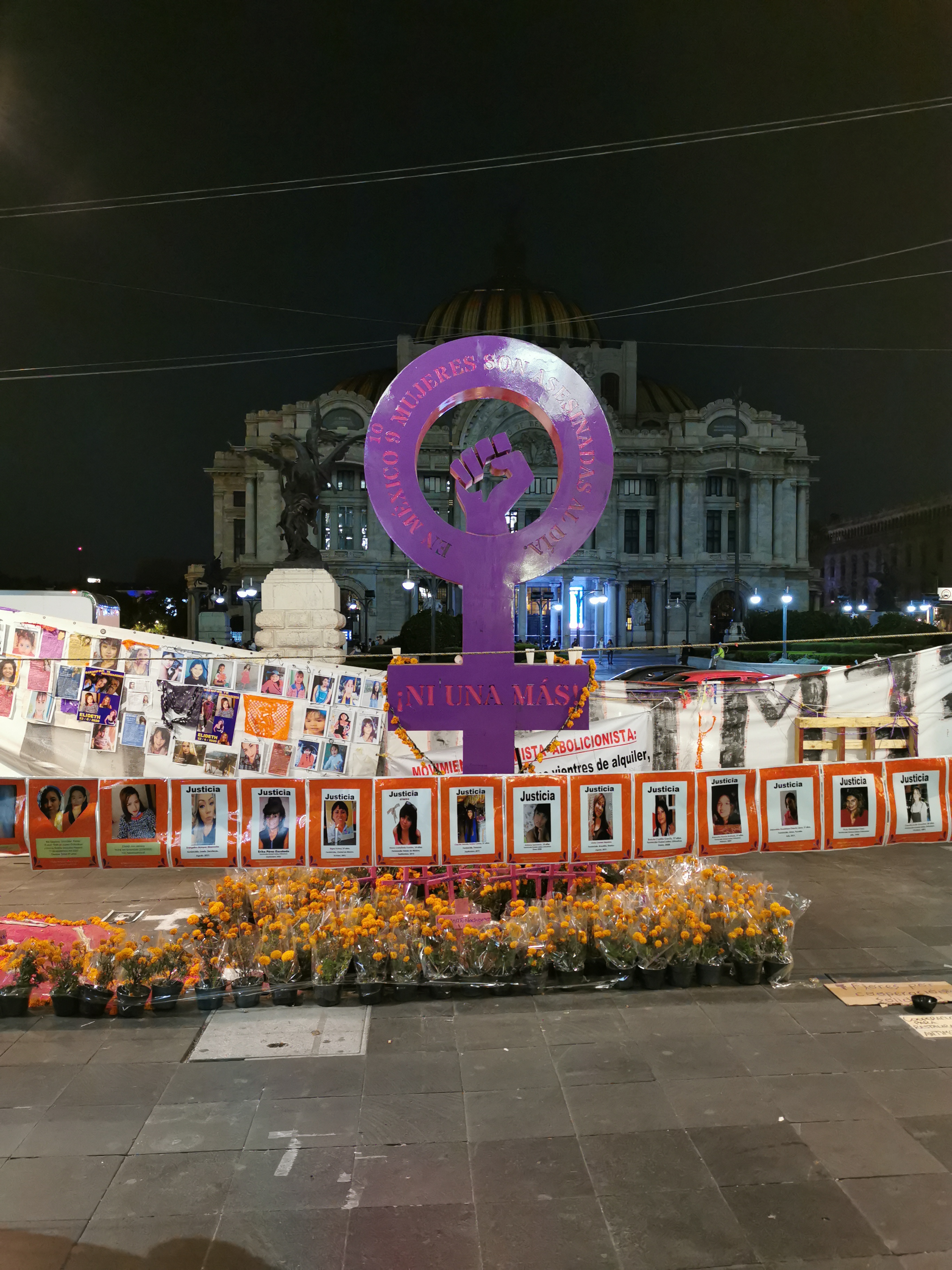
An anti-monument against femicides in Mexico, in front of the Palacio de Bellas Artes in Mexico City

Women in the Mexican drug war have been participants and civilians. They have served for or been harmed by all belligerents. There have been female combatants in the military, police, cartels, and gangs. Women officials, judges, prosecutors, lawyers, paralegals, reporters, business owners, social media influencers, teachers, and non-governmental organizations directors and workers have also been involved in different capacities. Women citizens and foreigners, including migrants, have been raped, tortured, and murdered in the conflict.

Cartels and gangs fighting in the conflict carry out sex trafficking in Mexico as an alternative source of profits. Some members of criminal organizations also abduct women and girls for sexual slavery and carry out sexual assault of migrants from Latin America to the United States.

Groups of women known as madres buscadoras ('searching mothers') have become prominent for organizing searches for disappeared relatives, and their work has uncovered unmarked mass graves that provide evidence of widespread disappearances.

=== Journalists and the media ===
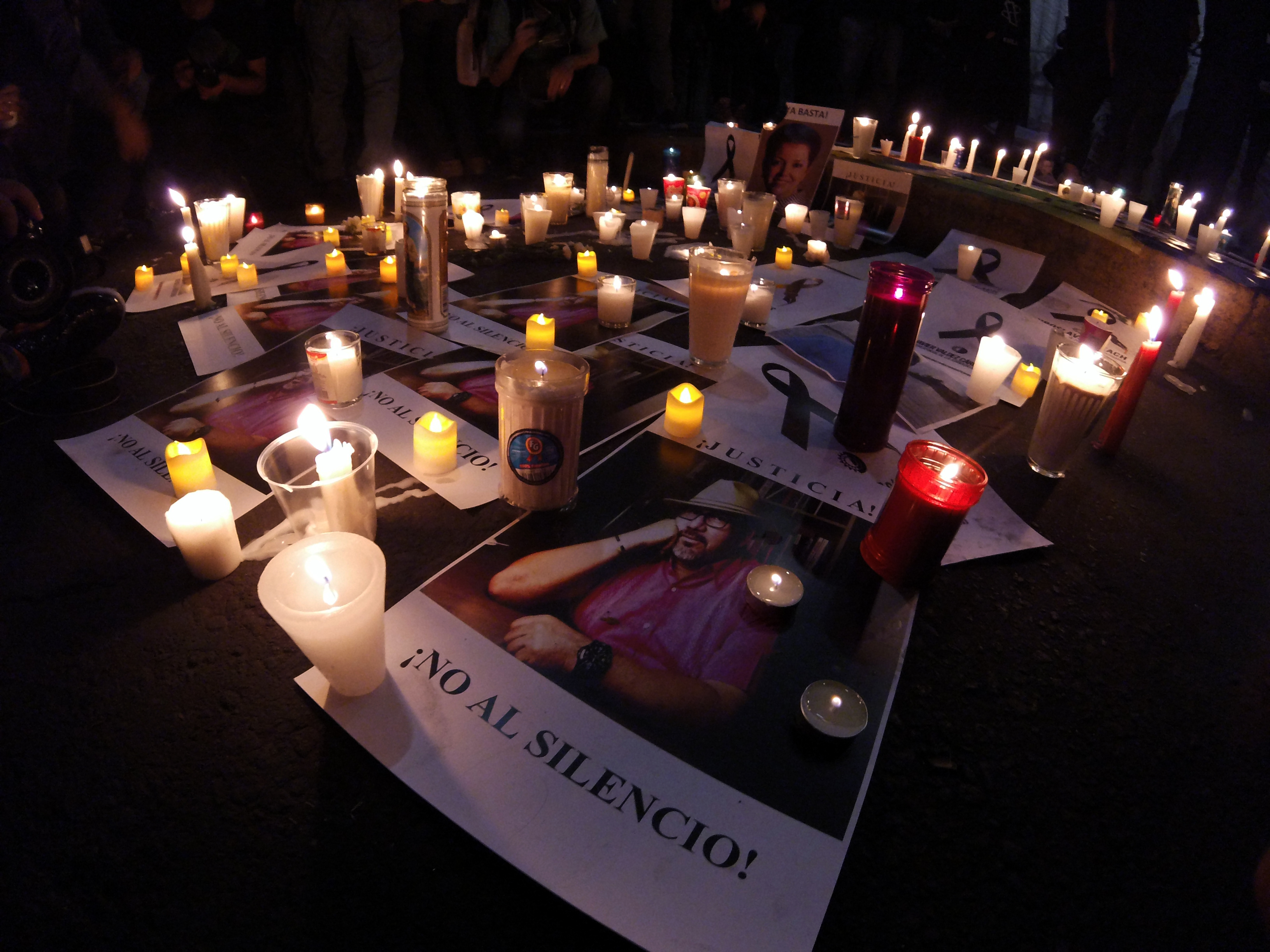
Demonstration against the murder of Mexican journalist Javier Valdez Cárdenas in May 2017

The increase in violence related with organized crime has significantly deteriorated the conditions in which local journalism is practiced. In the first years of the 21st century, Mexico was considered the most dangerous country to practice journalism, according to groups like the National Human Rights Commission, Reporters Without Borders, and the Committee to Protect Journalists. Between 2000 and 2012, several dozen journalists, including Miguel Ángel López Velasco, Luis Carlos Santiago, and Valentín Valdés Espinosa, were murdered there for covering the Mexican drug war.

The offices of Televisa and local newspapers have been bombed. Cartels have also threatened to kill news reporters in the U.S. who have done coverage on the drug violence. Some media networks stopped reporting on drug crimes, while others have been infiltrated by cartels. Since harassment neutralized many traditional media outlets, anonymous, sensationalized blogs like Blog del Narco took on the role of reporting on events related to the drug war. Cartels responded by targeting bloggers and citizen journalists active on social media. Several have been tortured or killed for posting and denouncing cartel activities. In September 2011, citizen journalist NenaDLaredo of the website Nuevo Laredo Envivo was allegedly murdered by Los Zetas.

In May 2012, several journalist murders occurred in Veracruz. Regina Martinez of Proceso was murdered in Xalapa. A few days later, three Veracruz photojournalists were tortured and killed, and their dismembered bodies were dumped in a canal. The targeting of journalists has prompted national and international condemnation. International watchdogs have urged Mexican authorities to end impunity for attacks on journalists.

About 74 percent of the journalists killed since 1992 in Mexico have been reporters for print newspapers, followed in number by Internet media and radio at about 11 percent each. Television journalism accounts for 4 percent of the deaths.

=== Murders of politicians ===
Since the start of the Mexican drug war in 2006, drug trafficking organizations have increasingly targeted politicians, especially local leaders in contested areas. Part of the strategy used by criminal groups behind the killings of local figures is the weakening of the local governments. For example, María Santos Gorrostieta Salazar, former mayor of Tiquicheo, Michoacán, who had survived three earlier assassination attempts and the murder of her husband, was abducted and beaten to death in November 2012. Extreme violence puts politicians at the mercy of cartels, allowing them to increase their control of government structures and expand their influence. The 2018 general elections were the deadliest on record, with more than 130 candidates and politicians killed nationwide. Political violence has been most acute in states such as Guerrero, Michoacán, Veracruz, Guanajuato, and Oaxaca, where local governance is highly fragmented.

In addition, because mayors usually appoint local police chiefs, they are seen by cartels as key assets in their criminal activities to control the police forces in their areas of influence. Cartels also seek to control the local governments to win government contracts and concessions; these projects help them ingrain themselves in the community and gain the loyalty and respect of the communities in which they operate. Politicians are usually targeted for three reasons: (1) Political figures who are honest pose a direct threat to organized crime, and are consequently killed by cartels; (2) Politicians make arrangements to protect a certain cartel and are killed by a rival cartel; and (3) A cartel kills politicians to heat the turf of the rival cartel that operates in the area.

=== Massacres and exploitation of migrants ===
Cartels have engaged in kidnapping, ransom, murder, robbery, and extortion of migrants traveling from Central America through Mexico on their way to the United States and Canada. Cartels have also forced migrants to join their organization and work for them, a situation that has been described as slavery. Mass graves have been also discovered in Mexico containing bodies of migrants. In 2011, 177 bodies were found in a mass grave in San Fernando, Tamaulipas, the same area where the bodies of 72 migrants were found in 2010, where most victims "died of blunt force trauma to the head."

Cartels have also infiltrated the Mexican government's immigration agencies and attacked and threatened immigration officers. The National Human Rights Commission of Mexico (Comisión Nacional de los Derechos Humanos, CNDH) said that 11,000 migrants had been kidnapped in 6 months in 2010 by drug cartels.

=== Human trafficking ===
There are documented links between Mexican cartels and human trafficking for forced labor, forced prostitution, and rape. The wife of a cartel leader described a system in which young girls became prostitutes and then were forced to work in drug factories. In the early 2010s, Los Zetas reportedly began to move into the prostitution business (including the prostitution of children) after previously only supplying women to already existing networks.

The U.S. State Department says that the practice of forced labor in Mexico is larger in extent than forced prostitution. Mexican journalists like Lydia Cacho have been threatened and forced into exile for reporting on these events.

== Effects internationally ==
=== Canada ===
The Mexican Army curtailed the ability of the Mexican drug cartels to move cocaine inside the U.S. and Canada, prompting an upsurge in gang violence in Vancouver in 2009, where the cocaine price has increased from $23,300 to almost $39,000 per kilo as the Canadian drug markets experienced prolonged shortages. As evidence of this pressure, the U.S. government stated the amount of cocaine seized on U.S. soil dropped by 41 percent between early 2007 and mid-2008. Since 2009, Vancouver has become the Mexican cartels' main center of operations in Canada.

=== Europe ===
The U.S. market is being eclipsed by booming demand for cocaine in Europe, where users now pay twice the going U.S. rate. In 2008, U.S. Attorney General Michael Mukasey announced that an international drug interdiction operation, Project Reckoning, involving law enforcement in the United States, Italy, Canada, Mexico and Guatemala had netted more than 500 organized crime members involved in the cocaine trade. The announcement highlighted the Italian-Mexican cocaine connection.

Concerns about European security and the trafficking of drugs through the European continent have grown in recent years, and, in December 2022, Europol and the DEA released a joint report on the situation involving Mexican drug trafficking through the EU.

In December 2011, the government of Spain remarked that Mexican cartels had multiplied their operations in that country, becoming the main entry point of cocaine into Europe. In 2012, it was reported that Mexican cartels had joined forces with the Sicilian Mafia, when Italian officials unearthed information that Palermo's black market, along with other Italian ports, was used by Mexico's drug cartels as a conduit to bring drugs to the European market, in which they had been trafficking drugs, particularly cocaine, throughout the Atlantic Ocean for over ten years to Europe.

In 2016, investigations into transatlantic drug trafficking revealed that the Kinahan Clan, Ireland's largest drug traffickers, had joined with prominent figures in Mexico, South America, West Africa, and Europe to form an informal "Super Cartel." However, the extent of its coordination remains unclear. The 2017 wedding of Daniel Kinahan in Dubai helped investigators identify key members such as Ridouan Taghi, Ricardo Riquelme Vega, Naoufal Fassih, and Camorra boss Raffaele Imperiale. In 2022–23, a major international operation led to 49 arrests, including traffickers Edin "Tito" Gacanin and Zuhair Belkhair, accused of moving large amounts of cocaine through Rotterdam; though many members of the "Super Cartel" remain in custody, both were released shortly after their arrests.

==== Involvement of Mexican cartels in the Russo-Ukrainian War ====
In July 2025, the Mexican Intelligence in collaboration with Ukrainian security forces, revealed that in the Russian invasion of Ukraine Colombian and Mexican mercenaries were sent in the war-zone in the International Legion by the drug cartels to gain war tactics and especially knowledge on the use of drones FPV for battles with the security forces and rival cartels in Mexico. In August 2025, it was revealed that the Jalisco New Generation Cartel (CJNG) created a specific paramilitary unit, of at least 10 members, for the use of drones FPV using the tactics learned in the War in Ukraine.

=== Guatemala ===
The Mexican Army crackdown has driven some cartels to seek a safer location for their operations across the border in Guatemala, attracted by corruption, weak policing, and its position on the overland smuggling route. The smugglers pick up drugs from small planes that land at private airstrips hidden in the Guatemalan jungle. The cargo is then moved up through Mexico to the U.S. border. Guatemala has also arrested dozens of drug suspects and torched huge cannabis and poppy fields. The U.S. government sent speedboats and night-vision goggles under a regional drug aid package.

Los Zetas have gained ground in Guatemala after they killed several high-profile members and the supreme leader of Los Leones, an organized crime group from Guatemala. In February 2009, Los Zetas threatened to kill the president of Guatemala, Álvaro Colom. On March 1, 2010, Guatemala's chief of national police and the country's top anti-drugs official were arrested over alleged links to drug trafficking. A report from the Brookings Institution warns that, without proactive, timely efforts, the violence will spread throughout the Central American region. In August 2025, Guatemala granted temporary humanitarian status to 161 Mexicans fleeing cartel violence in Chiapas.

=== South America ===
Patricio Pazmiño, the Interior Minister of Ecuador, stated that the February 2021 riots at three prisons that took 79 lives were related to Mexican and Colombian drug gangs. The government intercepted a record 126 tons of cocaine in 2020.

On September 8, 2021, National Prosecutor Jorge Abbott declared that Mexican cartels were attempting to establish themselves in Chile. It is known that Sinaloa Cartel has attempted to use Chile as a transit route for the shipment of cocaine to Rotterdam in the Netherlands. The activity of the CJNG includes an attempt at establishing a drug laboratory in Iquique as well as the import of marihuana through the port of San Antonio.

=== United States ===
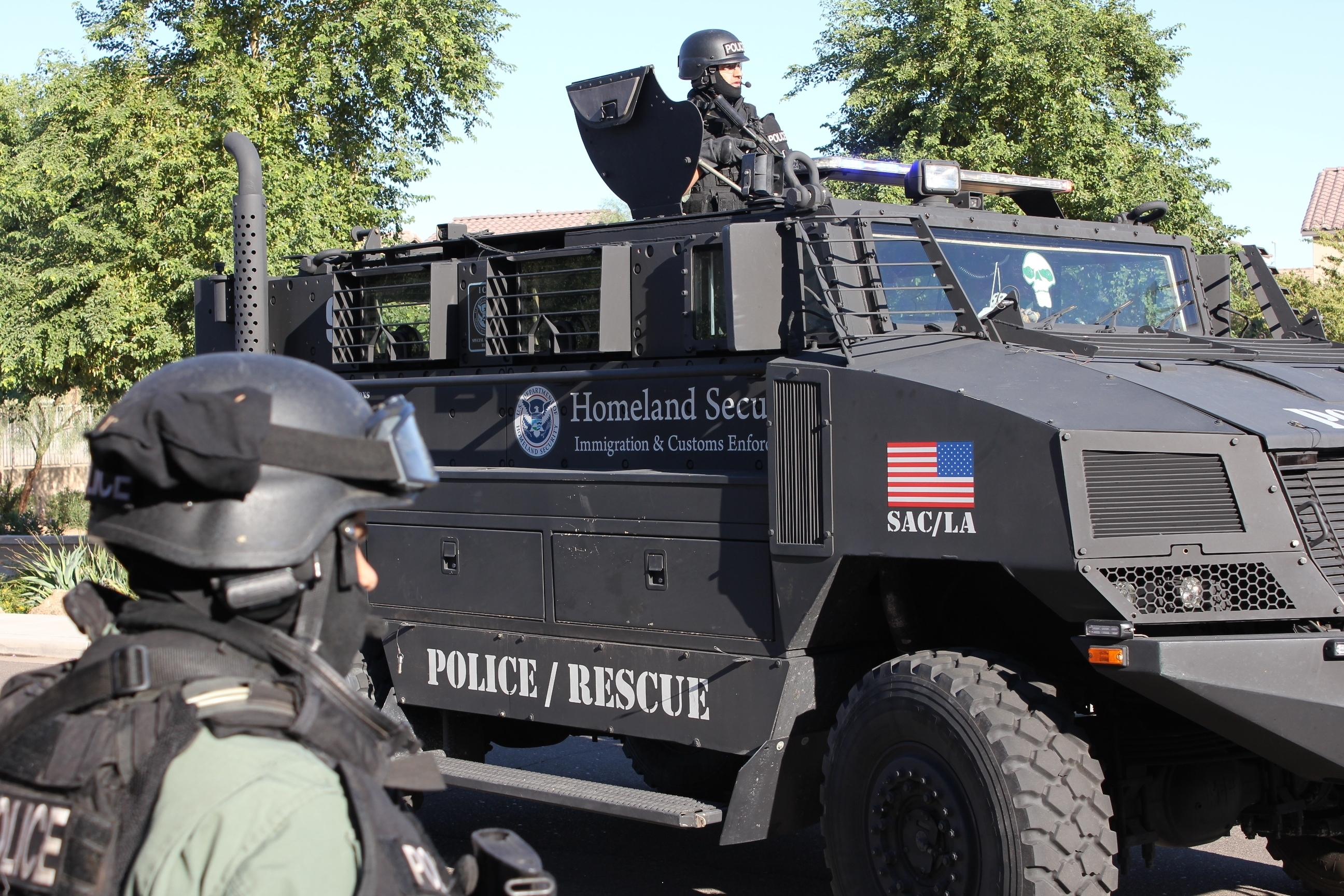
Special reaction team (SRT) during operation against the Sinaloa Cartel in the Arizona's western desert, October 2011

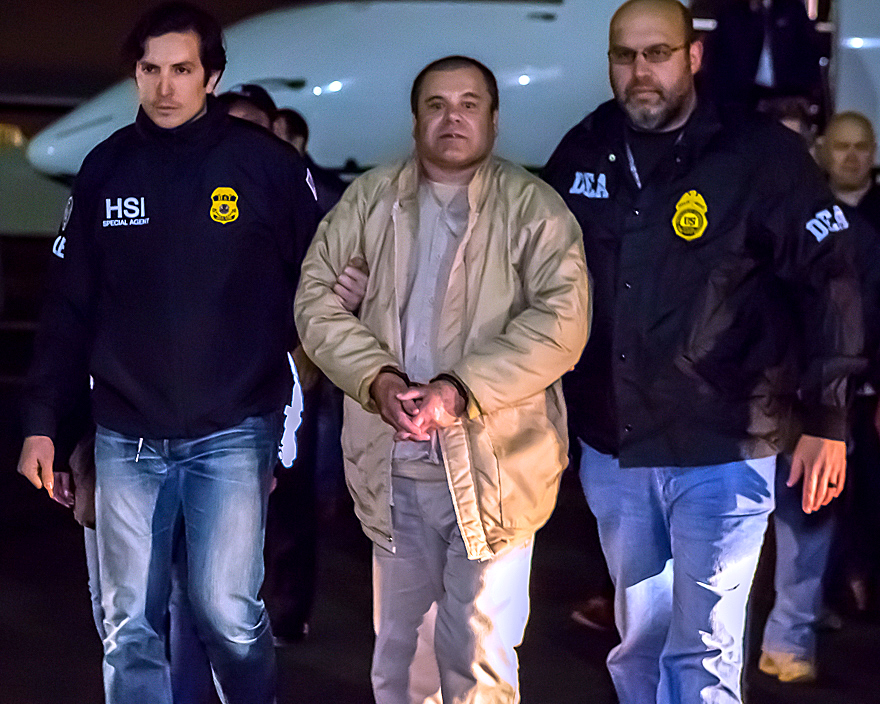
Joaquin Guzmán in U.S. custody when extradited on January 19, 2017

The U.S. Justice Department considers the Mexican drug cartels to be the "greatest organized crime threat to the United States." In seeking partnership from the United States, Mexican officials point out that the illicit drug trade is a shared problem in need of a shared solution, and remark that most of the financing for the Mexican traffickers comes from American drug consumers. On March 25, 2009, U.S. Secretary of State Hillary Clinton stated that "[America's] insatiable demand for illegal drugs fuels the drug trade", and that "the United States bears shared responsibility for the drug-fueled violence sweeping Mexico."

U.S. State Department officials knew that Mexican ex-president Felipe Calderón's willingness to work with the United States was unprecedented on issues of security, crime and drugs, so the U.S. Congress passed legislation in late June 2008 to provide Mexico and Central American countries with US$1.6 billion for the Mérida Initiative, a three-year international assistance plan that provides law enforcement training and equipment, as well as technical advice to strengthen the national justice systems. Under the Foreign Narcotics Kingpin Designation Act, the United States has sanctioned numerous Mexican drug traffickers and organizations by freezing assets and prohibiting financial transactions with them.

Currently, the Mexican drug cartels already have a presence in most major U.S. cities. In 2009, the Justice Department reported that Mexican drug cartels distribute drugs in nearly 200 cities across the United States, including Los Angeles, Chicago, and Atlanta. Gang-related activity and violence has increased along the U.S. Southwest border region, as U.S.-based gangs act as enforcers for Mexican drug cartels. In October 2025, Mexican cartels are issuing bounties up to $50,000 for a hit on ICE and CBP agents according to the Department of Homeland Security.

==== U.S. death toll and national security ====
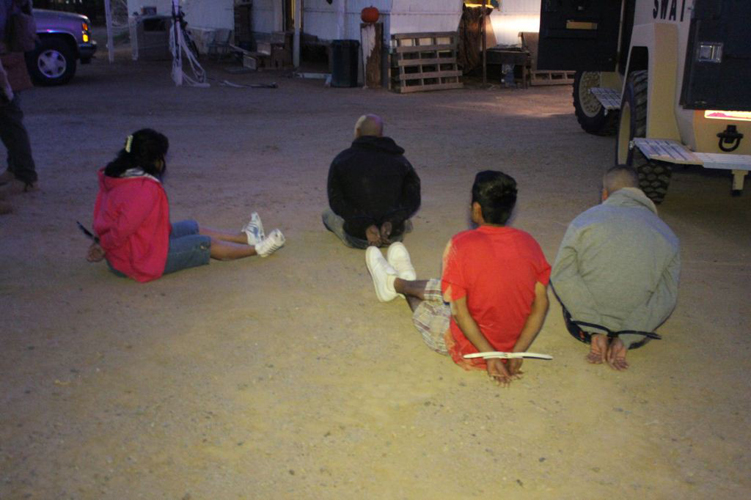
This ICE photo shows people under arrest. Officials announced the discovery of a large drug trafficking operation from Mexico into Arizona.

U.S. authorities reported a spike in killings, kidnappings, and home invasions connected to Mexican cartels, and at least 19 Americans were killed in 2008. Another 92 Americans were killed between June 2009 and June 2010.

The U.S. Joint Forces Command noted in a December 2008 report that the conflict will have a major impact on the stability of the Mexican state over the next several years, and therefore would demand an American response based on the implications for homeland security alone. After the JFC broached this issue in its 2008 report, several journalists and academics have discussed the possibility that Mexico could become a failed state. The Mexican government responded negatively to the U.S. government raising the prospect of Mexico becoming a failed state. To smooth over relations with Mexico over this issue, Secretary of State Hillary Clinton personally visited Mexico City in March 2009, followed by a visit by President Barack Obama a month later.

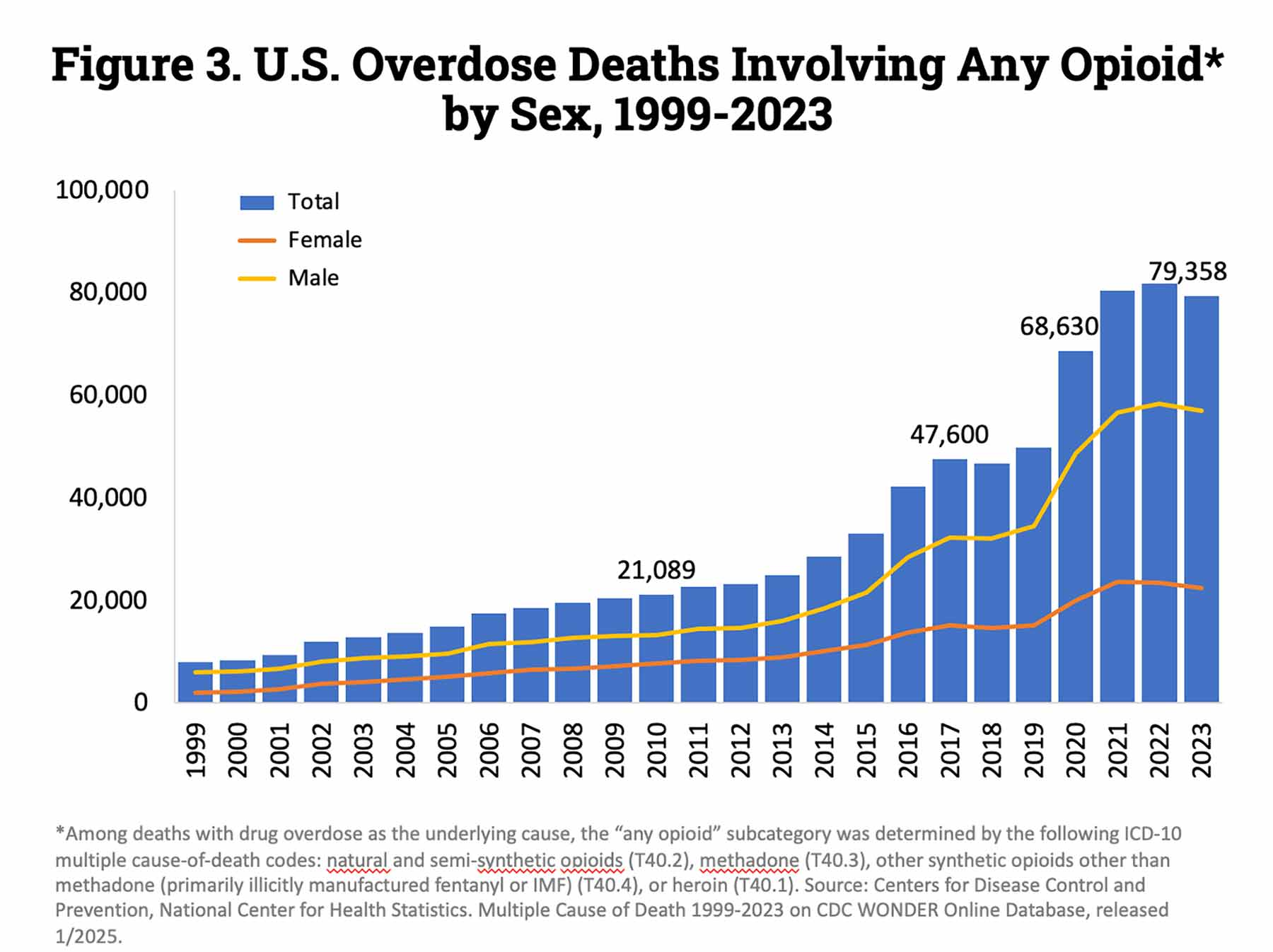
Number of yearly U.S. opioid overdose deaths from all opioid drugs.

In March 2009, the U.S. DHS said that it was considering using the National Guard to counter the threat of drug violence in Mexico from spreading to the U.S. The governors of Arizona and Texas have asked the federal government to send additional National Guard troops to help those already there supporting local law enforcement efforts against drug trafficking. Calls for National Guard deployment on the border greatly increased after the 2010 murder of Arizona rancher Robert Krentz, possibly at the hands of Mexican drug smugglers.

In March 2009, the Obama administration outlined plans to redeploy more than 500 federal agents to border posts and redirect $200 million to combat smuggling of illegal drugs, money, and weapons. On May 25, 2010, President Obama authorized deployment of 1,200 National Guard troops to the U.S. border with Mexico to assist with border protection and enforcement activities, as well as help train additional Customs and Border Protection agents. The Washington Office on Latin America said the U.S. southwest border region remained calm, with a homicide rate lower than the national average.

In 2021, around 80,411 people died from opioid overdoses in the United States. Many of the deaths are from an extremely potent opioid, fentanyl, which is trafficked from Mexico. The drug's precursor chemicals, which have a variety of legitimate uses, are manufactured in China, then shipped to Mexico, where it is processed and packaged, which is then smuggled into the US by drug cartels. The opioid crisis in the United States is largely fueled by drugs smuggled from Mexico; approximately 98% of fentanyl entering the U.S. comes from Mexico. In 2023, the Biden administration announced a crackdown on members of the Sinaloa Cartel smuggling fentanyl into the United States. In 2025, President Donald Trump launched a process to designate Mexican drug cartels and other criminal organizations as foreign terrorist organizations. The Trump administration has considered drone strikes against cartels in Mexico.

=== West Africa ===
At least nine Mexican and Colombian drug cartels have established bases in several West African nations, with notable activity in Guinea-Bissau and Sierra Leone, among other places. They have reportedly worked closely with local criminal gangs to carve out a staging area for access to the lucrative European market. The Colombian and Mexican cartels have discovered that it is easier to smuggle large loads into West Africa and then break that up into smaller shipments to Europe – mostly Spain, the United Kingdom and France. Higher demand for cocaine in Western Europe in addition to North American interdiction campaigns has led to dramatically increased trafficking in the region: nearly 50% of all non-U.S. bound cocaine, or about 13% of all global flows, is now smuggled through West Africa.

== Controversies ==
=== Allegations of CIA involvement ===
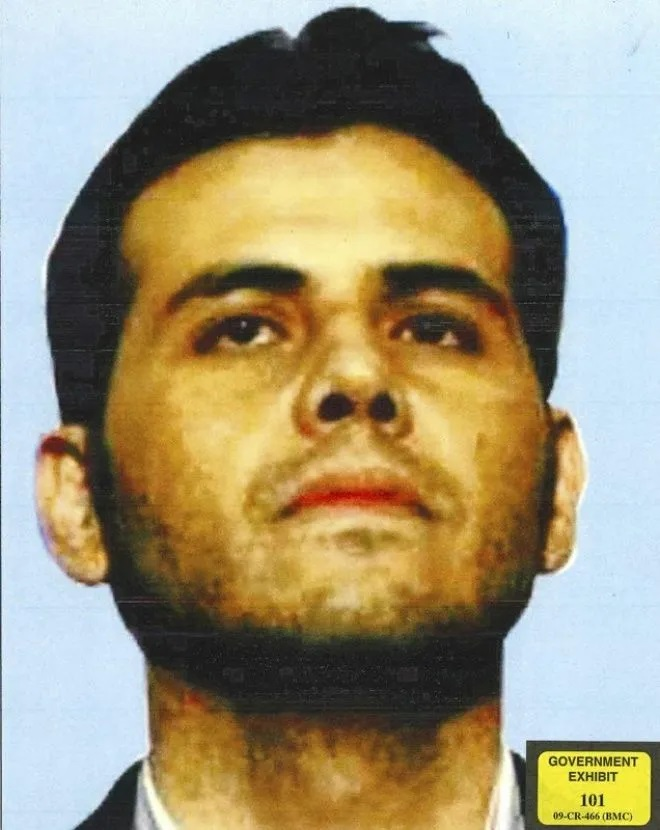
Jesús Vicente Zambada Niebla is the son of Ismael Zambada García (alias, "El Mayo"), one of the top leaders of the Sinaloa drug-trafficking organization

Vicente Zambada Niebla, a high-ranking member of the Sinaloa Cartel, claimed after his arrest that he and other Sinaloa Cartel members had received immunity from U.S. agents and a virtual license to smuggle cocaine over the United States border, in exchange for intelligence about rival cartels engaged in the Mexican drug war.

In October 2013, two former federal agents and an ex-CIA contractor told an American television network that CIA operatives, including Félix Rodríguez, were involved in the kidnapping and murder of DEA covert agent Enrique Camarena, because he was a threat to the agency's drug operations in Mexico. According to them, the CIA was collaborating with drug traffickers, and using its share of the profits to finance Nicaraguan Contra rebels attempting to overthrow Nicaragua's Sandinista government. A CIA spokesman responded, calling it "ridiculous" to suggest that the Agency had anything to do with the murder of a U.S. federal agent or the escape of his alleged killer.

=== Operation Trizor and Condor ===
In a joint operation funded by the United States, helicopters were used to spray marijuana plants with an herbicide called paraquat. The operations eliminated 22,000 acres of poppies and 9,500 acres of marijuana fields. Of over 2,000 samples sent to the PharmaChem Foundation 22% of them were found to have been contaminated with paraquat. Laboratories in the U.S. at the time of operations' publication were overwhelmed with requests to test marijuana. The effects were estimated to potentially effect 13 million people. Due to its link to Parkinson's, pulmonary fibrosis and other diseases, the European Union banned the herbicide in 2007, followed by China in 2016.

=== Money laundering ===
Although Mexican drug cartels and their Colombian suppliers generate and launder between $18 billion to $39 billion from sales to the United States each year, the U.S. and Mexican governments have been criticized for their unwillingness or slow response to confront the various cartels' financial operations, including money laundering. The U.S. DEA has identified the need to increase financial investigations relating to the movement of illegal drug funds to Mexico. The DEA has noted that the U.S. and Mexican financial services industry continues to be a facilitator for money laundering.

In August 2010, President Felipe Calderón proposed new measures to combat cash smuggling and money laundering. Calderón proposed a ban on cash purchases of real estate and of certain luxury goods that cost more than 100,000 pesos (about US$8,104). His package would also require more businesses to report large transactions, such as real estate, jewelry and purchases of armor plating. In June 2010, Calderón announced strict limits on the amount in U.S. dollars that can be deposited or exchanged in banks, but the restrictions were relaxed in 2014.

In 2011, Wachovia, at one time a major U.S. bank, was implicated in laundering money for Mexican drug traffickers. In a settlement, Wachovia paid federal authorities $110 million in forfeiture. A U.S. Senate report from the permanent subcommittee for investigations revealed in July 2012 that HSBC moved $7 billion in bulk cash from Mexico to the U.S., most of it suspected to assist Mexican cartels and U.S. drug cartels in moving money to the U.S. While regulators have flagged money laundering problems at HSBC for nearly a decade, the bank continued to avoid compliance. In December 2012, HSBC settled for a $1.93 billion fine.

=== Drug demand and decriminalization ===
According to former Presidents Fernando Henrique Cardoso of Brazil, Ernesto Zedillo of Mexico and César Gaviria of Colombia, the United States-led drug war is pushing Latin America into a downward spiral; Cardoso said in a conference that "the available evidence indicates that the war on drugs is a failed war". The panel of the Latin American Commission on Drugs and Democracy commission, headed by Cardoso, stated that the countries involved in this war should remove the "taboos" and re-examine the anti-drug programs. Latin American governments have followed the advice of the U.S. to combat the drug war, but the policies have had little effect. The commission made some recommendations to United States President Barack Obama to consider new policies, such as decriminalization of marijuana and to treat drug use as a public health problem and not as a security problem. The Council on Hemispheric Affairs states it is time to consider drug decriminalization and legalization.

RAND studies released in the mid-1990s found that using drug user treatment to reduce drug consumption in the United States is seven times more cost-effective than law enforcement efforts alone, and it could potentially cut consumption by a third. In 2011, the Obama administration requested approximately $5.6 billion to support demand reduction. This includes a 13% increase for prevention and almost a 4% increase for treatment. The overall 2011 counter-drug request for supply reduction and domestic law enforcement is $15.5 billion, with $521.1 million in new funding.

In April 2020, the Mexican Senate approved an amnesty law for first-time, nonviolent offenders, including those convicted of small-scale drug possession. In June 2021, the Supreme Court decriminalized recreational cannabis use, a decision viewed as a step toward modernizing national drug policy. However, critics note that these measures have had little impact on drug-related violence, since marijuana sales in Mexico constitute only a minor share of cartel revenues compared to synthetic drugs, cocaine, and other illicit activities.

== See also ==
- Timeline of the Mexican drug war
- 2011–12 in the Mexican drug war
- Drug liberalization
- Jefe de plaza
- List of journalists and media workers killed in Mexico
- List of massacres in Mexico
- List of Mexican drug cartels
- List of Mexican drug cartel figures
- List of Mexican states by homicides
- List of politicians killed in the Mexican drug war
- Narcoterrorism
- Naval operations of the Mexican drug war
