= Rafael Mas Hernández =

Spanish geographer

Rafael Mas Hernández (1950 – 23 January 2003) was a Spanish geographer.
