= Rafael Cedeño Hernández =

Mexican former drug trafficker

- Born: Mexico
- Other names: El Cede
- Known for: Leader of La Familia Michoacana
- Predecessor: Alberto Espinoza Barrón
- Successor: Nazario Moreno González

Notes
- In prison

Rafael Cedeño Hernández is a Mexican imprisoned drug trafficker who was a high-level leader of La Familia Michoacana, a drug cartel based in the Mexican state of Michoacán. He was the successor of Alberto Espinoza Barrón, a drug trafficker who was arrested on 31 December 2008 by the Mexican authorities.

His drug cartel, La Familia Michoacana uses murder and torture to quash rivals, while building a social base in the Mexican state of Michoacán. It was the fastest-growing cartel in the country's drug war, and is a religious cult-like group that celebrates family values, and justifies murder as "divine justice".

Rafael Cedeño was arrested on 20 April 2009 during a raid at a baptism party for a baby born to a cartel member.
