= Raúl Hernández Barrón =

Mexican drug lord

- Born: 4 February 1977; Poza Rica, Veracruz, Mexico
- Died: 26 July 2014 (aged 37); Reynosa, Tamaulipas, Mexico
- Cause of death: Gunshot wounds
- Employers: Mexican Army (1993–1999); Los Zetas (suspected)
- Criminal charges: Drug trafficking; Organized crime involvement; Illegal possession of firearms; Bribery
- Criminal status: Deceased

Raúl Hernández Barrón (4 February 1977 – 26 July 2014), also known by his alias Flanders 1, was a Mexican suspected drug lord and high-ranking member of Los Zetas, a criminal group based in Tamaulipas, Mexico. Hernández Barrón served in the Mexican Army from 1993 to 1999 as an infantry soldier. He then left and joined the Gulf Cartel under the kingpin Osiel Cárdenas Guillén, and became part of the first members of their newly formed paramilitary wing, Los Zetas. Like Hernández Barrón, most of the first members of Los Zetas were ex-military. Los Zetas was responsible for providing security services to Cárdenas Guillén and carrying out executions on the cartel's behalf. Hernández Barrón was also responsible for coordinating drug trafficking activities in Veracruz.

In 2006, Hernández Barrón was part of the commando that killed the regional Mexican music singer Valentín Elizalde following a concert in Reynosa. Investigators suspect that Elizalde was killed for playing a song that taunted Los Zetas. Hernández Barrón was arrested by the Mexican Army in Coatzintla in 2008 and charged with drug trafficking, organized crime involvement, and illegal possession of firearms. He was eventually released from prison. In 2010, the United States Department of the Treasury carried out economic sanctions against him for his involvement with the cartel. In 2014, he was killed in a shootout with the Mexican Federal Police in Reynosa.

== Early life and career ==
Raúl Hernández Barrón was born in Poza Rica, Veracruz, Mexico, on 4 February 1977. According to the United States Department of the Treasury (USDT), he had listed alternative places of birth in Coatzintla and Veracruz. He also had an alternative date of birth of 16 October 1980. Hernández Barrón joined the Mexican Army as an infantry soldier on 1 September 1993. During his tenure, Hernández Barrón worked closely with the Federal Judicial Police (PJF) in their anti-narcotics unit. (Note: Among his colleagues in the police force were Arturo Guzmán Decena ("Z-1"), Heriberto Lazcano Lazcano, Ernesto Zatarain Vélez, Galindo Mellado Cruz, Miguel Ángel Soto Parra, Lucio Hernández Lechuga, Sergio Enrique Ruiz Tlapanco, Raúl Alberto Trejo Benavides and Rogelio Guerra Ramírez. These colleagues would later leave the military and join organized crime.) Hernández Barrón voluntarily left the military on 1 or 30 September 1999.

He then joined the Gulf Cartel, a criminal group based in Tamaulipas. He formed part of their newly created paramilitary group known as Los Zetas, which was mostly composed of ex-commandos. He was hired by the kingpin Osiel Cárdenas Guillén and given the alias "Flanders 1". Hernández Barrón was one of the founding members of Los Zetas. His brother Víctor Manuel Hernández Barrón ("Flanders 2") was also part of Los Zetas and worked under Cárdenas Guillén. When Hernández Barrón joined Los Zetas, the group was originally responsible for proving security services to Cárdenas Guillén and carrying out executions on the cartel's behalf. However, it underwent organizational changes over the years and began to involve itself in other criminal activities, like drug trafficking alongside the Gulf Cartel.

Aside from his paramilitary duties, Hernández Barrón was also responsible for coordinating drug trafficking activities for the cartel in northern Veracruz. Within Los Zetas, he reported directly to Heriberto Lazcano Lazcano ("Z-3"), and worked closely with Efraín Teodoro Torres ("Z-14"), who also headed drug trafficking activities in Veracruz. Hernández Barrón's role in Veracruz included facilitating drug trafficking shipments to the states of Tamaulipas, Nuevo León, Coahuila, and Chihuahua. Once the drugs made it to these states, they were smuggled into the U.S. for further distribution. His network included third-party smuggling groups that paid a fee to Los Zetas to move drugs through their turf. Hernández Barrón was also responsible for coordinating a group of hitmen that killed rival gangsters or people who betrayed the cartel. A bounty was placed for his arrest in 2005, and anti-drug chief Noé Ramírez Mandujano said that the arrests of Hernández Barrón, Torres and Lazcano were top priorities for the government.

On 25 November 2006, regional Mexican singer Valentín Elizalde was killed after playing at a concert in Reynosa. According to investigators, he was killed for playing a narcocorrido called "A Mis Enemigos" ("To My Enemies"), whose lyrics made indirect antagonistic references to the Gulf Cartel and Los Zetas. The song was reportedly made in honor of Joaquín "El Chapo" Guzmán, the former head of the rival Sinaloa Cartel and once considered Mexico's most-wanted drug lord. Months prior to his murder, in August 2006, a Sinaloa Cartel sympathizer uploaded a video on YouTube with graphic images of bullet-ridden bodies from members of the Gulf Cartel and Los Zetas. "A Mis Enemigos" was used as the video's soundtrack. The video triggered a heated online conversation between sympathizers from both cartels. Elizalde was advised by his music representative not to sing in Reynosa, but he went against the advice and concluded the concert by playing "A Mis Enemigos" twice. The song angered several members of organized crime who were in attendance. One of them was Jaime González Durán ("El Hummer"), a former high-ranking Zetas member, who ordered his gunmen to kill Elizalde. Hernández Barrón was part of the commando in charge of the attack; (Note: Another Zetas member implicated in the murder was Raúl Alberto Trejo Benavides ("El Alvin"). However, he was killed years prior on 13 May 2002.) Following Elizalde's death, another video was uploaded on YouTube depicting those reportedly responsible for his death; Hernández Barrón's pictures were shown in the video.

On 22 June 2007, media outlets from South Texas incorrectly stated that Hernández Barrón was arrested at a home in Rio Grande City, Starr County, Texas, following an operation by Texan authorities and U.S. federal agents. (Note: Another source stated he was arrested in Roma, Texas.) U.S. officials were tipped of the location due to an anonymous citizen who notified them that the person was living in the U.S. illegally. The media reported that U.S. Border Patrol agents and Texas Rangers deported him to Mexico via the McAllen–Hidalgo–Reynosa International Bridge at 3:00 pm, and that he was subsequently arrested by the Mexican Army, the Federal Investigative Agency (AFI), and the Subprocuraduría de Investigación Especializada en Delincuencia Organizada (SIEDO), Mexico's organized crime investigation agency. In Mexico, it was alleged that he faced weapon charges and that he was flown to Mexico City to face his criminal offenses. Mexican authorities did not give an official statement on the arrest and refused to grant interviews to reporters at the scene. Customs agents, however, spoke to the press and confirmed that the man in question was in fact Miguel Ángel Hernández Barrón, another suspected criminal.

== Arrest ==
On Saturday 22 March 2008, (Note: Another source stated he was arrested on 21 March 2008.) the Mexican Army and the Attorney General's Office (PGR) arrested Hernández Barrón at a home in Coatzintla. The soldiers were based out of the 19th Military Zone in Tuxpan, Veracruz. At the scene, authorities seized an AR-15 rifle, a 9 mm handgun, bullet-proof vest, and several rounds of ammunition. They confirmed he was listed on the PGR's database as one of the most-wanted criminals in Mexico using his full name and military picture. According to the PGR, Hernández Barrón was subject to a federal investigation for drug trafficking and organized crime involvement, and was a suspect in Elizalde's murder. The PGR also stated that his arrest was part of a law enforcement campaign against drug trafficking activities, and for violations of Mexico's Federal Law of Firearms and Explosives.

Hernández Barrón's arrest highlighted the growing presence of Los Zetas in Veracruz. In political circles, government officials worried that leaders of Los Zetas were using Veracruz as their center of operations. The growing drug-related violence and firearms attacks alerted Veracruz officials. Prior to Hernández Barrón's arrest, Veracruz suffered eight violent incidents that left seven dead, including three policemen and one military officer. It was also one of the states in Mexico with the largest weapon seizures that year. Politicians asked the federal government to provide more support to combat organized crime; they doubted the state government's capacity to reduce drug-related violence. Several Veracruz congressmen from the National Action Party (PAN) and the Party of the Democratic Revolution (PRD) directly accused the Governor, Fidel Herrera Beltrán, from the Institutional Revolutionary Party (PRI) for the government's perceived inability to combat the cartels.

=== Trial and charges ===
On 25 March, a Mexico City federal court ordered Hernández Barrón to be placed under a 90-day preventative detention before he faced trial to allow the prosecution to gather more evidence against him. The court confirmed that they granted this motion because he was facing drug trafficking, organized crime involvement, and illegal possession of firearm charges. In a press interview on 28 March, President Felipe Calderón used Hernández Barrón's arrest as an example that the Mexican government does not negotiate with organized crime. "With this [arrest] it is clear that my government does not negotiate with criminals that attempt against young people and that threaten the life, integrity or freedom of Mexicans in any part of the country," he said. On 27 July 2008, a federal court in Jalisco charged Hernández Barrón with illegal possession of firearms and bribery. More details of his arrest were also made public; the prosecution provided evidence that Hernández Barrón tried to bribe authorities with US$100,000 to let him go when he was arrested, and that he claimed to be a Veracruz State Police officer. By October 2008, Hernández Barrón remained in prison without a conviction. Dozens of other suspected drug lords from multiple cartels were in the same legal status as him.

On 24 March 2010, the Office of Foreign Assets Control (OFAC), a branch of the USDT, sanctioned 54 high-ranking members of the Gulf Cartel and Los Zetas, including Hernández Barrón, under the Foreign Narcotics Kingpin Designation Act (Kingpin Act). This sanction was made after U.S. and Mexican officials met in Mexico City the day before as part of the Mérida Initiative. It also included the support of the U.S. Drug Enforcement Administration (DEA) and their special operations team, which assisted the OFAC in identifying the designated suspects. The list of designated suspects included drug traffickers, money launders, hitmen, and enforcers. Several of them controlled drug trafficking operations in Tamaulipas, Nuevo León, and other parts of Mexico, and had previous drug charges in the U.S.

Though Hernández Barrón was already imprisoned in Mexico at the time of the sanction, he faced drug-related charges in the U.S. and was considered a fugitive. As part of the sanction, the U.S. government prohibited U.S. citizens from engaging in business activities with Hernández Barrón and froze all of his U.S.-based assets. This was done to reduce his financial support to the Gulf Cartel and Los Zetas, and prevent him from having access to the international financial sector. Hernández Barrón faced up to US$5 million in fines and up to 30 years in prison for such violations. In the release, the OFAC publicly named one of Hernández Barrón's addresses as being in Coatzintla.

== Death ==
On the evening of 25 July 2014, several shootouts between the Mexican Federal Police and suspected gunmen of the Gulf Cartel broke out in different parts of Reynosa. The shootouts were described as part of the aftermath turmoil that originated after regional cartel boss Eleno Salazar Flores ("Pantera 6") was arrested. According to law enforcement reports, that evening a vehicle driven by suspected cartel members was ordered to stop by policemen. The suspects disobeyed the request and fled the scene, which triggered a vehicle pursuit; a shootout then broke out between both parties. Three suspected gangsters were killed, including Hernández Barrón. The following morning, reporters stated that another shootout broke out in Reynosa near the Pharr–Reynosa International Bridge. This incident also originated from a vehicle pursuit, but in this occasion one police officer was killed and two others were wounded. Six suspected cartel members were arrested and taken into custody. Though government officials did not give an official statement on these shootouts, there were reports of more shootouts, roadblocks, and presence of armed men around Reynosa on social media.

== See also ==
- Mexican drug war

== Bibliography ==
- Deibert, Michael (2014). In the Shadow of Saint Death: The Gulf Cartel and the Price of America's Drug War in Mexico. Rowman & Littlefield. ISBN 978-1493010653.
- Grayson, George W. (2010). Mexico: Narco-Violence and a Failed State?. Transaction Publishers. p. 291. ISBN 978-1412811514.
- Grayson, George W. (2012). The Executioner's Men: Los Zetas, Rogue Soldiers, Criminal Entrepreneurs, and the Shadow State They Created (1st ed.). Transaction Publishers. ISBN 9781412846172.
- Lovelace, Douglas (2015). Terrorism: Commentary on Security Documents Volume 138: The Resurgent Terrorist Threat. Vol. 138. Oxford University Press. ISBN 978-0199351091.
