= Raúl Alberto Trejo Benavides =

Mexican drug lord

- Born: Villahermosa, Tabasco, Mexico
- Died: 13 May 2002; Monterrey, Nuevo León, Mexico
- Cause of death: Gunshot wounds
- Body discovered: Matamoros, Tamaulipas, Mexico
- Other names: Z-6; Z9-HK24; El Alvin
- Employers: Mexican Army (1991–1999); Federal Judicial Police; Los Zetas (suspected)
- Criminal status: Deceased

Raúl Alberto Trejo Benavides (died 13 May 2002) was a suspected Mexican drug lord and high-ranking member of Los Zetas, a criminal group based in Tamaulipas, Mexico. Trejo Benavides served in the Mexican Army from 1991 to 1999, and was a member of the Grupo Aeromóvil de Fuerzas Especiales (GAFE), the army's special forces. He joined the Gulf Cartel under its leader Osiel Cárdenas Guillén after leaving the army, becoming one of the first members of its newly formed paramilitary wing, Los Zetas. Like Trejo Benavides, most of the first members of Los Zetas were ex-military. Los Zetas was responsible for providing security services to Cárdenas Guillén and carrying out executions on the cartel's behalf.

In 2002, Trejo Benavides was mortally wounded in a shootout against rival Cartel members in Monterrey. His comrades took his body to a hotel in Matamoros, where they abandoned it after arranging the corpse and the room to simulate a suicide. His death triggered disagreements between Los Zetas leader Arturo Guzmán Decena and Gulf Cartel boss Cárdenas Guillén. The Mexican government remained unaware that Trejo Benavides had died, and continued to issue charges against him along with other Zetas leaders. By 2009, a high-ranking Zetas member confessed to authorities that Trejo Benavides had been dead for several years.

== Early life and career ==
Raúl Alberto Trejo Benavides was born in Villahermosa, Tabasco, Mexico. He joined the Mexican Army on 3 May 1991, later becoming a member of the Grupo Aeromóvil de Fuerzas Especiales (GAFE), the army's special forces. While with the GAFE, Trejo Benavides worked closely with the Federal Judicial Police (PJF), in their anti-narcotics unit. (Note: Among his colleagues in the police force were Arturo Guzmán Decena, Heriberto Lazcano Lazcano, Ernesto Zatarain Vélez, Galindo Mellado Cruz, Miguel Ángel Soto Parra, Lucio Hernández Lechuga, Sergio Enrique Ruiz Tlapanco, Raúl Hernández Barrón, and Rogelio Guerra Ramírez, all of whom would later leave the military and become involved in organized crime.) During his service, Trejo Benavides reportedly received military and counter-drug training in the United States.

Rather than retaining military reserve status or deserting without notice, Trejo Benavides requested voluntary removal from active duty and left the Mexican Armed Forces on 16 March 1999. He then joined the Gulf Cartel, a criminal group based in Tamaulipas. He became a member of the cartel's newly created paramilitary group, known as Los Zetas, which was largely composed of ex-commandos. He was hired by cartel boss Osiel Cárdenas Guillén, and was given the nickname "El Alvin". In Los Zetas, Trejo Benavides also used the code names "Z-6" and/or "Z9-HK24".

When Trejo Benavides joined Los Zetas, the group's purpose was to provide security services to Cárdenas Guillén and carry out executions on the cartel's behalf. Trejo Benavides was one of the founding members of Los Zetas who was reportedly part of the Grupo de los 14 (English: Group of 14), who were the first fourteen Zetas members. He was one of the most adept gunmen in the group. Over the years, Los Zetas underwent organizational changes and became increasingly involved in other criminal activities alongside the Gulf Cartel, including drug trafficking.

== Injury and death ==
On 13 May 2002, Trejo Benavides and nearly twenty other members of Los Zetas mounted an operation in Monterrey, Nuevo León to kidnap Dionisio Román García Sánchez ("El Chacho"), a former state police officer and the head of a Nuevo Laredo-based smuggling group known as Los Chachos. The commando was headed by Víctor Manuel Vázquez Mireles. They were acting on intelligence information provided by the police chief Arturo Pedroza Aguirre, who tipped off García Sánchez's location to Cárdenas Guillén and Los Zetas. During the attack, rival cartel member Juvenal Sánchez Torres ("El Juve") was killed, and Los Zetas successfully abducted García Sánchez from his home along with three of his henchmen. García Sánchez was found dead later that day in Río Bravo, Tamaulipas. Trejo Benavides was injured by García Sánchez's associates, and died from gunshot wounds after failing to receive medical attention. His comrades transported his corpse from Monterrey to Matamoros, where they abandoned it in a hotel room.

After learning that Trejo Benavides had died, his boss, Guzmán Decena, threatened Cárdenas Guillén. Reportedly, Guzmán Decena did not support the idea of having García Sánchez killed, and told Cárdenas Guillén, "Either you fix this problem of [García Sánchez] and [Trejo Benavides] or we will turn you in to the Army". (Note: Direct quote: "O arreglas esta bronca de Dionisio y Alvín o te entregamos al Ejército.") Cárdenas Guillén took the threat seriously, reportedly commissioning his lawyer, Galo Gaspar Pérez Canales, to help him use the press to present Trejo Benavides' death as a suicide. Several journalists helped the Gulf Cartel to fabricate the story. Cárdenas Guillén also received the support of the Tamaulipas State Police chief stationed in Matamoros, Plácido de Jesús Martínez Gutierréz.

=== Investigation and reactions ===
Trejo Benavides' body was found at 3:00 p.m. when a hotel staff member entered the room for housekeeping after checkout time. His corpse was laid out on the bed, fully dressed, and holding a gun in his hand to indicate that he had committed suicide. Another hotel staff member stated that he did not know the name(s) of the individual(s) who had taken the room, that they had arrived by taxi, and that they did not look suspicious. (Note: The article suggests that the hotel where Trejo Benavides was dropped off was a love motel, or short-term stay motel frequently used in Mexico for couples seeking privacy for sexual activity. Check-in at these hotels is usually anonymous.) Local authorities found two identity documents on the body: a Tamaulipas university ID and a state driver's license, both in the name of Ramón Esparza Torres. El Bravo newspaper in Matamoros reported that the man was a professor, who had killed himself for sentimental reasons. The article was published in the police section, and the story circulated widely in Matamoros. The body was sent to a local funeral parlor, where a wake was held. Several organized crime members were in attendance. Los Zetas helped arrange the transfer of the corpse to Tabasco, his home state.

Guzmán Decena's death threats angered Cárdenas Guillén, who reportedly spoke to Los Zetas members Heriberto Lazcano Lazcano and Omar Lorméndez Pitalúa about plans to eliminate him. In November 2002, after learning that Guzmán Decena was at his girlfriend's home in Matamoros, Cárdenas Guillén reportedly called on the Mexican Army to arrest him. Guzmán Decena confronted the soldiers upon their arrival, and was killed by gunfire. After Guzmán Decena's death, Cárdenas Guillén granted greater freedom and concessions to Los Zetas. He allowed several members to join his inner security circle, and granted others permission to coordinate marijuana and cocaine operations in Nuevo Laredo and Miguel Alemán, Tamaulipas, two corridors previously under the Gulf Cartel's control. Trejo Benavides' position in Los Zetas was taken over by Mellado Cruz, who was also a former GAFE.

== Bounty and charges ==
The Mexican government was unaware of Trejo Benavides' death for several years, and continued to issue charges against him. On 18 June 2003, Mexico's Attorney General's Office (PGR) placed an unspecified bounty on 31 members of Los Zetas, including Trejo Benavides. Authorities stated that Trejo Benavides was "highly dangerous", given his military background and his suspected role in homicides, drug trafficking, kidnappings, and carjackings. This announcement was made after the Specialized Unit Against Organized Crime (UEDO) identified him as a high-ranking member of Los Zetas following the 14 March arrest of Cárdenas Guillén.

On 25 November 2006, regional Mexican singer Valentín Elizalde was killed after playing at a concert in Reynosa. According to investigators, he was killed for playing a narcocorrido called "A Mis Enemigos" ("To My Enemies"), whose lyrics made indirect antagonistic references to the Gulf Cartel and Los Zetas. Investigators suspected that Trejo Benavides was part of the commando that shot Elizalde, and he accordingly became a suspect in the murder investigation along with his colleague Hernández Barrón. By 2009, Mexican authorities learned that Trejo Benavides was dead when former Zetas member Mateo Díaz López ("Comandante Mateo") confessed that fact to investigators after viewing the mug shots of wanted Zetas members.

== See also ==
- Mexican drug war

== Bibliography ==
- Grayson, George W. (2010). Mexico: Narco-Violence and a Failed State?. Transaction Publishers. p. 291. ISBN 978-1412811514.
- Grayson, George W. (2012). The Executioner's Men: Los Zetas, Rogue Soldiers, Criminal Entrepreneurs, and the Shadow State They Created (1st ed.). Transaction Publishers. ISBN 9781412846172.
- Pérez, Ana Lilia (2016). Verdugos: Asesinatos brutales y otras historias secretas de militares (in Spanish). Penguin Random House Grupo Editorial México. ISBN 978-6073138659.
- Marley, David (2019). Mexican cartels: an encyclopedia of Mexico's crime and drug wars. ABC-CLIO. ISBN 9781440864766. OCLC 1096213037.
- Kent, Robert B. (2016). Latin America, Second Edition: Regions and People. Guilford Publications. ISBN 978-1462525522.
