= Almanza (surname) =

Almanza is a Spanish surname. Notable people with the surname include:

- Albert Almanza (1936–2023), Mexican-American basketball player
- Armando Almanza (born 1972), American baseball player
- Ashley Almanza (born 1964), South African businessman
- Cristóbal Téllez de Almanza, Governor-General of the Philippines
- Eduardo Almanza Morales, Mexican druglord
- Eduardo Castro Almanza (born 1954), Mexican long-distance runner
- Eusebia Adriana Cosme Almanza (1908–1976), Afro-Cuban poetry reciter and actress
- Guadalupe García Almanza (born 1960), Mexican politician
- Izan Almansa (born 2005), Spanish basketball player
- Nestor Almanza (born 1971), Cuban wrestler
- Martín Enríquez de Almanza (died 1583), Viceroy of New Spain
- Raymundo Almanza Morales, Mexican druglord
- Rose Mary Almanza (born 1992), Cuban middle-distance runner
- Rubén Almanza (1929–2020), Mexican basketball player
- Susana Almanza, environmental activist and politician
