= Eleno Salazar Flores =

Mexican drug lord

- Born: Jiménez, Tamaulipas, Mexico; 1964 or 1965 (age 60–61)
- Other names: Pantera 6
- Occupation: Drug lord
- Employer: Gulf Cartel
- Criminal charge: Drug trafficking
- Criminal penalty: 20 years
- Criminal status: Convicted

Eleno Salazar Flores (born 1964 or 1965), also known as "Pantera 6" (English: Panther 6), is a Mexican convicted drug lord and former high-ranking member of the Gulf Cartel, a criminal group based in Tamaulipas, Mexico. He was a trusted enforcer of former kingpin Mario Ramírez Treviño, who appointed him the regional boss of Camargo. He helped to coordinate cocaine and marijuana shipments heading to Reynosa and Río Bravo before they were smuggled into the U.S. for further distribution. In 2014, he was arrested by federal forces in Reynosa and imprisoned in a maximum-security facility in the State of Mexico. Salazar Flores was convicted of drug trafficking in 2017 and sentenced to 20 years. He was also ordered to pay 500 days of the minimum wage in fines, totaling MXN$33,645.

== Early life and career ==
Eleno Salazar Flores was born in Jiménez, Tamaulipas, Mexico, in 1964 or 1965. He was a high-ranking member of the Gulf Cartel, a criminal group based in Tamaulipas. When Salazar Flores started his criminal career, he was known for keeping a low-profile. He then rose through the leadership ranks and became one of the Gulf Cartel's main administrators under the kingpin Mario Ramírez Treviño ("El Pelón"). After cartel leader Samuel Flores Borrego ("Metro 3") was killed in September 2011, Ramírez Treviño reportedly took his place and appointed Salazar Flores as the regional boss of Camargo. In this role, he was responsible for coordinating drug trafficking shipments heading to Reynosa and Río Bravo before they were smuggled into the U.S. for further distribution. He was also responsible for supervising human trafficking rings, arms smuggling operations and the flow of drug proceeds back into Mexico. Independent smugglers who wanted to operate in his region were ordered to pay a fee that Salazar Flores's faction collected. (Note: In the Mexican criminal underworld, this fee or taxation is known as piso.) The corridor in Tamaulipas that Salazar Flores supervised was key to the Gulf Cartel's international drug trafficking operations. By working closely with Ramírez Treviño, Salazar Flores was identified as a high-ranking member of the Gulf Cartel and became increasingly important. In August 2013, Ramírez Treviño was arrested, and Salazar Flores began to work under kingpin Juan Manuel Rodríguez García ("Juan Perros"), who became one of the cartel's leaders.

In the cartel, Salazar Flores was known by his alias "Pantera 6" (English: Panther 6), a code name that derived from his association with the cartel faction known as Los Pantera (English: The Panthers) or Grupo Pantera (English: Panther Group). He was reportedly the leader of the faction which served as an assassination squad and was composed mostly of former members from the Tamaulipas State Police. Salazar Flores also went by the alias "Leno", which is a shortened version of his first name Eleno. In June 2013, a federal judge in the State of Mexico issued an arrest warrant against him for his organized crime involvement and drug trafficking charges. Salazar Flores was also subject to at least three investigations at the federal level for other crimes under that jurisdiction. (Note: Another source stated that there were at least four federal investigations against Salazar Flores.) After Rodríguez García was arrested in May 2014, infighting broke out within the Gulf Cartel, and factions headed by Salazar Flores competed against those aligned to Juan Francisco Martínez Ramírez ("Paquito 77"). (Note: In primary sources, Juan Francisco Martínez Ramírez was referred to by his aliases José Francisco Loredo Gaona or Francisco Banda Lucio. However, it was later revealed that his alias was "Paquito 77", whose real identity is Martínez Ramírez.) In mid-2014, the Mexican government began a new security strategy to combat organized crime groups in Tamaulipas. They issued a list of the states's fourteen most-wanted criminals, including Salazar Flores. (Note: The existence of this list was first published by the media outlet 24 Horas in April 2014. It included 12 most-wanted criminals instead of 14. The cited source mentions that the list was released officially in May 2014. In July 2014, the list was updated to 14 criminals, this time including Salazar Flores.)

== Arrest and conviction ==
On 24 July 2014, Salazar Flores was arrested in Reynosa during a joint operation carried out by the Attorney General's Office (PGR), the Federal Police, the Mexican Navy and Army. He was captured with Guadalupe Gerardo Treviño Estrada (aged 48), a state police officer from Matamoros. According to the National Security Commission (CNS) (es) chief Monte Alejandro Rubido García, his arrest was a result of law enforcement intelligence. Security forces received a tip from an anonymous citizen who told the police of a meeting being held by organized crime members. This information helped security forces learn of Salazar Flores' whereabouts. No shots were fired during his apprehension. At the scene, authorities seized two vehicles, three handguns, three rifles and magazines, and a bag with methamphetamine. For carrying firearms, both suspects were found in flagrante delicto and were indicted for illegal possession of firearms. Both Salazar Flores and Treviño Estrada were placed under the jurisdiction of the PGR. They were flown to Mexico City on 25 July for their formal declaration at the PGR's installations in Colonia Guerrero.

On 25 July 2014, several shootouts between the Federal Police and suspected Gulf Cartel gunmen broke out in different parts of Reynosa. The shootouts were described as part of the turmoil in the aftermath of Salazar Flores' arrest. According to law enforcement reports, that evening a vehicle driven by suspected cartel members was ordered to stop by policemen. The suspects disobeyed the request and fled the scene which triggered a pursuit; a shootout then broke out between both parties. Three suspected gangsters were killed, including Raúl Hernández Barrón ("El Flanders 1"), a high-ranking cartel member. The following day, journalists reported that another shootout broke out in Reynosa near the Pharr–Reynosa International Bridge. This incident also originated after a vehicle stop, but on this occasion one police officer was killed and two others were wounded. Six suspected cartel members were arrested and taken into custody. Though government officials did not provide an official statement on these shootouts, there were reports of more gunfights, roadblocks, and the presence of armed men around Reynosa on social media.

In August 2014, Salazar Flores was transferred to the Federal Social Readaptation Center No. 1 ("Altiplano"), a maximum-security prison in the State of Mexico, following an order from a State of Mexico federal judge. On 25 April 2017, the Assistant Attorney General's Office for Special Investigations on Organized Crime (SEIDO), Mexico's organized crime investigation agency, confirmed that a judge in Toluca, State of Mexico, had sentenced Salazar Flores to 20 years in prison and 500 days of minimum-wage fines, totaling MXN$33,645 (roughly US$1,787 in 2017). The conviction confirmed that Salazar Flores played a leading role as one of the Gulf Cartel's financial operators. In addition, he was found guilty of participating in cocaine and marijuana trafficking activities from Mexico to the U.S., as well as collecting taxes from independent traffickers who operated in his region.

== See also ==
- Mexican drug war
