= Eduardo Almanza Morales =

Mexican drug lord

- Eduardo Almanza Morales
- Born: Eduardo Almanza Morales; Matamoros, Tamaulipas
- Other name: El Gori II
- Occupation: Lieutenant of Los Zetas
- Employers: Mexican Army (1997–2003); Los Zetas
- Relatives: Octavio Almanza Morales, brother Raymundo Almanza Morales, brother
- Reward amount: Mexico: 15 million Mexican Pesos; USA: 2.5 million USD

Eduardo Almanza Morales (alias El Gori II) is a Mexican drug lord of Los Zetas. In March 2009, Almanza Morales was listed by Procuraduría General de la República—Mexico's equivalent to an attorney general office in some English-speaking countries—as one of Mexico's 37 most wanted drug lords. He had been linked to the introduction of illegal drugs into Mexico from Belize and Guatemala on behalf of the Gulf Cartel. Some sources have reported that Eduardo Almanza Morales was killed by Mexican law enforcement during a shootout in December 2009. However, as of 3 March 2013, he was still listed as wanted by the Mexican Procuraduría General de la República. The Mexican government offers 15 million Mexican Pesos (approximately 1.2 million US dollars) for information leading to his capture.

== Narco family ==
He is the brother of two other drug lords listed on the list of Mexico's 37 most wanted drug lords: Ricardo Almanza Morales (alias, "El Gori I"), who was killed by Mexican authorities on 4 December 2009, and Raymundo Almanza Morales (alias "El Gori III"), who was captured by authorities on 22 May 2009. Together with his brothers Octavio, Raymundo and Ricardo, Eduardo has been accused of the executions of General Mauro Enrique Tello Quinones, in Cancun, and General Juan Esparza Garcia, in the town of Garcia, Nuevo Leon.

== Military training ==
Prior to his involvement with the Gulf Cartel and, later, with the cartel's violent criminal arm Los Zetas, Almanza Morales had been a member of Mexico's armed forces, where he received his military training. In the armed forces he was a corporal. According to "Historias del Narco", he joined to the Mexican army in 1997 and his military involvement ended on 16 October 2003.

== Alleged death ==
On 11 November 2012, it was reported that Eduardo Almanza Morales was killed in a shootout with Mexican law enforcement in December 2009. At least one report claimed that "Not much more is known about his death". However, as of 10 October 2012, the Procuraduría General de la República still maintained he was wanted, according to the Mexican Contenido S.A., news agency. On 11 November 2012, the respected Mexican "Millenio" newspaper reported that Eduardo Almanza Morales was killed in December 2009. Other sources—including the respected El Universal Mexican newspaper and "La Policiaca" (13 September 2012)—still allege he is still being sought by the authorities. In 2011, El Universal reported Almanza Morales had been killed. Likewise, "El Economista" reported in 2011 that Almanza Morales had been killed in a shootout with Mexican federal forces. The apparent contradictions may be the result of confusion on the part of the reporting agencies over four drug lords who, being biological brothers, share the same family names.

== See also ==
- List of fugitives from justice who disappeared
- List of Mexico's 37 most-wanted drug lords
