= Sigifredo Nájera Talamantes =

Mexican drug lord

- Born: 31 August 1980; Tamaulipas, Mexico or Delicias, Coahuila, Mexico
- Died: 7 September 2015 (aged 35); Mexico
- Other name: El Canicón
- Occupation: Los Zetas drug lord
- Status: Captured: 23 March 2009
- Criminal charges: Drug trafficking, money laundering, assault

Sigifredo Nájera Talamantes (31 August 1980 – 7 September 2015), commonly referred to by his alias El Canicón, was a Mexican drug lord and high-ranking leader of Los Zetas.

== Kingpin Act sanction ==
On 24 March 2010, the United States Department of the Treasury sanctioned Nájera Talamantes under the Foreign Narcotics Kingpin Designation Act (sometimes referred to simply as the "Kingpin Act"), for his involvement in drug trafficking along with fifty-three other international criminals and ten foreign entities. The act prohibited U.S. citizens and companies from doing any kind of business activity with him, and virtually froze all his assets in the U.S.

== Arrest ==
He was captured on 23 March 2009. The government of Mexico had listed Nájera Talamantes as one of its 37 most-wanted drug lords and offered the equivalent of over $1 million USD for information leading to his capture.

== Death ==
He died of a heart attack inside his prison cell at the Federal Social Readaptation Center No. 1 on 8 September 2015.

== See also ==
- List of Mexico's 37 most-wanted drug lords
