= Sergio Ruiz =

Sergio Ruiz may refer to:

- Sergio Enrique Ruiz-Tlapanco (born 1972), Mexican drug lord
- Sergio Ruiz (footballer) (born 1994), Spanish footballer
- Sergio Ruiz (athlete) (born 1989), Spanish athlete
