= Horst Overdick =

Guatemalan drug lord

Horst Walther Overdick
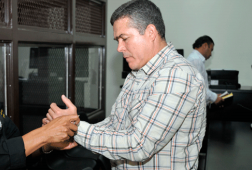
- Overdick being taken into custody.
- Born: Horst Walther Overdick; July 31, 1967 (age 58) or July 31, 1968 (age 57); Guatemala
- Other name: El Tigre
- Occupation: Los Zetas's drug lord
- Criminal penalty: Drug trafficking

Notes
- Arrested in April 2012

Horst Walther Overdick-Mejía, alias El Tigre (English: The Tiger), is a former Guatemalan drug lord and associate of the Mexican criminal group known as Los Zetas. He is known for helping Los Zetas cement their power in northern Guatemala. He was considered by the authorities as "one of the most prolific" drug lords in the country of Guatemala. He was arrested on 3 April 2012 in San Lucas, Guatemala.

== Criminal career ==
Overdick began as a trader of cardamom, a spice used in cooking, then used his knowledge of import and export routes to help Los Zetas drug cartel move cocaine to the United States from Guatemala. Nevertheless, since 1999, Overdick has been trafficking cocaine into Guatemala by securing airstrips in the country for planes carrying hundreds of kilograms to land. By the year 2002, he was responsible for more than 1,200-kilogram cocaine shipments at airstrips that arrived at the country, which he and his associates later hid in trucks to transport to Mexico. Overdick then began to purchase cocaine directly from Los Zetas, a Mexican criminal group. In fact, reports mention that he was the "first person to ally himself with Los Zetas in Guatemala" and cement their presence in 2008. During the investigations leading to Overdick's arrest, the Guatemalan authorities recovered videos of Overdick with prominent members of the Zetas at a "narco-fiesta," a large party hosted by drug traffickers in Guatemala, which took place at a horse race. Hand-written books with details of where the shipments of weapons, drugs, and money were also discovered by the authorities. And when his son Kevin Paul was captured by the authorities in July 2011, Overdick announced through radio that "men were going to start falling."

He was one of the most influential drug traffickers in Cobán, Alta Verapaz, and reports say that he "had been arrested before" but was later released because Overdick would "bribe or threaten" his prosecutors. Overdick was also the primary ally of Los Zetas in the departments of Petén, Izabal, and Alta Verapaz, establishing a cocaine-trafficking link between South America and Mexico.

The Woodrow Wilson Center claimed that the DEA had listed Overdick as one of the most-wanted drug lords.

=== Arrest ===
On 3 April 2012, Overdick was arrested by Guatemalan police and United Nations investigators after they raided his home in San Lucas Sacatepéquez, just 20 km (12 miles) west of the capital Guatemala City. During the time of his arrest, Overdick did not have bodyguards, and was accompanied only by a man and a woman who have not been identified. All the firearms inside his home had a license, but they were still confiscated by the authorities. Soon after the arrest, the U.S. embassy in Guatemala congratulated the authorities for Overdick's arrest. The Interior Minister, Mauricio López, mentioned that Overdick was the "most important nexus for the Zetas" in the northern part of the country. The Guatemalan and U.S. authorities are looking to extradite Overdick to the United States.

Experts in drug trafficking, like Cynthia Arsons, claimed that the apprehension of Overdick would cause a wave of violence in Guatemala, since the same strategy of removing drug kingpins in Mexico has resulted in surges of violent.

Possible changes in Guatemala's criminal underworld

Throughout all of 2011, several important and long-established drug traffickers in Guatemala were arrested. This includes two members of the Lorenzana crime family, along with Juan Ortiz-Lopez, nicknamed as Juan Chamale, ranked by the United States Drug Enforcement Administration (DEA) as Guatemala's "number one drug trafficker." Along with the arrival of Los Zetas, the past arrests have posed a threat to the "old generation of traditional narcos" in Guatemala, and raises questions on what is next for Guatemala's criminal underworld. And as Prensa Libre mentions, Los Zetas were not Overdick's only ally. Overdick also had an alliance with the organization of Mario Ponce Rodriguez's, who was arrested in Honduras in May 2011 and later extradited to the United States. His brother, Jorge Rodriguez, reportedly took control of the criminal group and made an alliance with Los Zetas. Overdick allegedly sold cocaine to the Zetas and to the Ponces. In addition, Overdick may have the same fate as Ponce, who is currently under custody in Miami and has agreed to provide intelligence on the structure of his organization for a soother life-sentence.

With the arrival and consolidation of Los Zetas, Overdick's alliance with them represented a new era for drug trafficking in Guatemala, mainly because the Zetas were eager to impose their military-like tactics instead of relying on family connections and support from communities as the Guatemalan crime families did.

=== Extradition process ===
A Guatemalan court authorized the extradition of Overdick to the United States on 13 June 2012, accusing him of being one of the top drug barons in Central America and a close associate of the Mexican drug cartel known as Los Zetas. Judges ruled that he was responsible for overseeing the drug flow of cocaine shipments from South America to the United States. The court also stated that Overdick had built several warehouses and clandestine dirt roads to traffic cocaine through land. Otto Pérez Molina, the president of Guatemala, must ratify the extradition before Overdick is sent to the United States. Overdick is believed to have granted Los Zetas with logistics necessary to set foot on Central America.

Extradition in Guatemala's justice system plays a huge role, largely because of political corruption, widespread immunity, and court weakness. Less than four percent of all cases are prosecuted, and top criminal leaders in Guatemala rarely face charges in their own country. In January 2011, the former president Alfonso Portillo was tried for alleged money laundering and embezzlement from charity donations. Aside from Portillo's scandal, what was at stake was the effectiveness of Guatemala's justice system. Many politicians before him – including several ex-presidents – were seen as "untouchable," and the extra cash they allegedly stole was "simply [their] reward for reaching the pinnacle." Nonetheless, despite the strong evidence against him, Portillo was acquitted of all charges and extradited to the U.S. Occurrences like this are not rare in Guatemala, since the failing court system must often rely on extradition to successfully impose justice and punish its criminals. Although there have been some pushes for extradition reforms, they are often filled with loopholes that delay the process. Guatemala's extradition practice, however, fails to address the country's weak justice system.

==== Extradition, imprisonment, and release ====
Overdick was extradited to the United States on drug trafficking charges on 10 December 2012. He was assigned Federal Inmate Number 91938-054 and incarcerated at the New York City Metropolitan Correctional Center, where he remains awaiting trial. He served over 6 years for drug-related charges. He was released from prison in April 2019 and deported back to Guatemala.
