= Alberto Pineda Villa =

Mexican drug lord

- Died: 12 September 2009; Morelos
- Other names: El Borrado
- Known for: Leader in the Beltrán-Leyva Cartel
- Title: Drug lord

Notes
- Status: Killed

Alberto Pineda Villa (died 12 September 2009), commonly referred to by his alias El Borrado ("The Hazle Eyes"), was a Mexican drug lord and high-ranking leader of the Beltrán Leyva Cartel, a drug trafficking organization. He was killed on 12 September 2009. He was one of Mexico's 37 most-wanted drug lords.

== See also ==
- List of Mexico's 37 most-wanted drug lords
