= Flavio Méndez Santiago =

Mexican drug lord (born 1975)

- Born: 11 May 1975 (age 51); Piedras Negras, Veracruz
- Other name: El Amarillo
- Occupation: Drug lord
- Employers: Mexican Army (1993–1997); Los Zetas
- Known for: Leader in Los Zetas

Flavio Méndez Santiago (alias El Amarillo) is a Mexican drug lord of Los Zetas.

== Kingpin Act sanction ==
On 24 March 2010, the United States Department of the Treasury sanctioned Méndez Santiago under the Foreign Narcotics Kingpin Designation Act (sometimes referred to simply as the "Kingpin Act"), for his involvement in drug trafficking along with fifty-three other international criminals and ten foreign entities. The act prohibited U.S. citizens and companies from doing any kind of business activity with him, and virtually froze all his assets in the U.S.

== Arrest ==
He was captured on January 18, 2011 in Villa de Etla, Oaxaca.

== See also ==
- List of Mexico's 37 most-wanted drug lords
