= Propaganda in the Mexican drug war =

In the ongoing Mexican drug war, drug cartels may often use propaganda through various methods to manipulate and persuade people— usually to shift public opinion to a more favorable view of them. Such methods include scare tactics and use of the media. These cartels’ use of propaganda are often used in precise ways in order to maximize the impact and effect on others.

The cartels have adopted the word "narco" to pertain to anything relating to the cartels, and it has spread to be a part of everyday Mexican slang. Narcocultura is the criminal culture of the drug cartels. There are music, television shows, literature, beverages, food, and architecture that all have been branded "narco". Narcocorridos are Mexican country songs glorifying the lifestyles of drug lords. They are typically produced by artists working with or being paid by Mexican drug lords. Cartels hang narco-banners up around cities to advertise themselves and threaten rival cartels. They also distribute narco-flyers, used for the same purposes as the narco-banners, by handing them out to people, scattering and posting them around cities, and leaving them near the bodies of homicide victims. A brand of beer, Malverde Beer, was named after a Mexican folklore character revered by drug traffickers, and the patron saint of drug trafficking.

The drug cartels' use of propaganda through new media has increased significantly as the primary source of connection with the people. It is seen as a war tactic against the Mexican government, taking its people and putting them against themselves. Many times cartels use bribery or threats against journalists and publications to report the cartels in a good light. They also bribe or threaten members of the local law enforcement to look the other way when drug trafficking crimes are committed. Blog del Narco was a blog that reported the true violence and nature of the drug war and drug cartels. It would report news often censored from other publications. It was shut down by the government after threats were made by cartels in the form of a message left on the bodies of two unidentified homicide victims.

There is activism against the influence of the drug cartels. Local police and the country's military work actively to prevent drug trafficking, discouraging recruits into drug cartels.

== Propaganda ==
The drug war has become rich with examples of propaganda and other means of psychological warfare. Cartels use high impact, often dramatic communication methods to threaten opponents, announce new policies, and, most importantly, to seek grassroot support. Through fear mongering, they have established themselves as dangerous to those who speak out against them. They provide simple public services to citizens and act as protectors from the government while covering their true motives. Deceased drug gangsters have often been honored with tombs of ivory with elaborate paintings to illustrate their contribution and alliance to a particular cartel.

Cartels have seeped into everyday life as civilians pass by walls of graffiti and road signs with digital media employing cartel public relations. There is now a "narco" vocabulary describing cartel related music, literature, and daily television shows. In addition, there are narcocastillos (castles) and even narcocerveza (beer). One particular brewery in Guadalajara created Malverde Beer, which was named after the patron saint of drug traffickers, Jesús Malverde. Smugglers (or mules) have been known to carry a picture of the saint with them during their operations. Although the Mexican brewery stated it was not meant to glamorize cartels, many have criticized it and Walmarts in Mexico refuse to distribute it. Some of the narcoliterature include books such as "El Amante de Janis Joplin", and "Nostalgia de la Sobra." Also, there are narcomantas (e.g. threats or explanations of criminal activity, left on a cloth banner), narcoblockades, narcomanifestaciones (demonstrations) and narcocorridos.

=== Music ===
==== Narcocorridos ====
Narcocorridos are a type of music that glamourizes the lifestyle of drug lords. It is country style music usually including instruments such as tubas and accordions. The music and music videos are widely popular. The music video, El Movimiento alterado, describing the Sinaloa cartel's drug violence, received three million hits on YouTube.

Sample lyrics:

Con un cuerno de chivo
y bazuka en la nuca
volando cabezas
al que se atraviesa

Translation:

With an AK
and a bazooka taking aim
blowing off the heads
of whoever gets in the way

The group Los Tucanes de Tijuana has now been banned from the city of Tijuana for having a close relationship with a drug cartel. Their songs contain lyrics such as:

With an R-15 in hand

and a satchel of grenades

a pistol on each leg

and a bulletproof vest

dressed in black

ready for battle

In a song titled, "La Familia Michoacana" lyrics are as follows:

Siguen duro trabajando,
no hay poder que los detenga,
si los siguen provocando
pagaran las consecuencias,
ya les han dejado claro
que sus plazas se respetan

Translation:

Continue working hard,
no power to stop them,
if you keep provoking them
you will pay the consequences,
they have made clear that their places are respected

Examples of narcocorridos from artist Mario "El Chachorro" Delgado include:

Su cartel ya lo conocen
le llaman La Vecindad
los contrarios por envidia
lo han querido asesinar
pero el "8" no está solo
su gente sabe trozar

Translation:

His cartel is well-known
it's called La Vecindad
His jealous enemies
want to take him out
but "8" isn't alone
his people are killers, too

The song titled, "El Mercenario", have the following lyrics:

Con la camisa bien puesta
del jefe Ismael y don Joaquin Guzman
defendere el monasterio
el legado, el imperio, que lograron crear
R con R cigarro
soy un Mercenario a la hora de pelear

Translation:

With the shirt on straight
Chief Don Joaquin Guzman and Ismael
will defend the monastery,
the legacy, the empire, who managed to create
R with R cigar
I'm a mercenary, time to fight

These are a few examples of the narco-corridos.

==== Narco Hip-Hop ====
A music scene, similar to the early underground gangsta rap scene, has emerged in northeastern Mexico (Nuevo León, Tamaulipas, and Coahuila), where the musical phenomenon of hip-hop is being co-opted by the influence of organized crime and the drug war in the region.

With lyrics similar to those of a narcocorrido (drug ballad), has appeared the Mexican Narco-rap.

However, unlike the corridos, which relate to rural regions of the Mexican Pacific (and which are generally linked to the Sinaloa Cartel) the narco-rap emerged in the urban area of Tamaulipas, in the border with Texas, a turf currently under armed dispute between Los Zetas and the Gulf Cartel.

Derived from the constant presence of "halcones" ("hawks", cartel spies) and cartel-convoys circulating the streets of the region, young people have been involved in the local narcoculture, and narco-raps express the reality of life on the streets of those cities under the drug cartels rule.

There are several notable cases, among them is a song called "The Song of Metro 3" that praises the life and exploits of drug lord Samuel Flores Borrego (alias Metro 3) for his "ferocity and loyalty".

Some of the main exponents of the genre are Cano y Blunt, DemenT and Big Los.

=== Other media ===
The drug cartels have been successful at influencing and manipulating the information environment by issuing their own press releases, controlling the content released about them and violence associated, and threatening journalists. They have managed to control who their audiences are, how they are perceived to them, and ultimately their actions or omission of actions. For example, cartels have historically purchased newspapers to publish articles written by cartel-recruited reporters. In addition to influencing indigenous reporting, United States' reporters have stopped covering the drug war and cartel violence as well. U.S. news directors and editors discourage their reporters to cover certain drug related stories.

The cartels have had to adjust to the challenges in dominating the information environment in a time when the internet and advanced computer networks have been used against them. Some cartels have "hired operational security specialist (narcohackers) to cope with the enhanced digital surveillance of their activities." As websites or social media have attempted to shine light on their activities, the cartels respond by threatening execution found on their social post or tweets. They also have been using websites to spread disinformation about their rivals and government officials.

=== Propaganda by cartel ===
==== Juárez Cartel ====
Narcomantas were placed attempting to antagonize U.S. government agencies around Juarez. The threats included using vehicle IEDs against the U.S. consulates which would be carried out by La Linea, Juárez's cartel enforcer group. However, it is possible "that a rival group deliberately misattributed these threats to La Linea in an effort to incite U.S. reprisal".

==== Knights Templar ====
The Knights Templar cartel cast themselves as defenders of the people, blaming federal and local authorities for drug violence casualties because of their lack of protection for the citizens especially from Knights Templar's rival, Los Zetas.

They said "they would stand down its own operations if the government secured the state; so the government could no longer use it as a pretext for abusing residents". When the pope went to visit in 2011, the Knights Templar made hand painted, cloth narcobanners asking the violence to cease while he visited.

Knights Templar propaganda maintains a soft tone to civilians, however, when they murder gang rivals, they use a much more aggressive approach. Right before the Pope was scheduled his 2011 visit, eight people were found killed with narcomantas placed upon them warning rivals to stay out of their territory while the Pope was visiting.

==== Los Zetas ====
Los Zetas have used the Internet and media to spread most of their propaganda and to glorify their lifestyle. There have been numerous YouTube videos of assassinations, torture scenes, and interrogations. Although these posts are quickly taken down, most of them are likely to have been seen and reposted somewhere else. When they discover individuals, blogs, or media speaking out against them on the Internet, they retaliate with violence. In September 2011, two people were found hanging from a bridge alongside a large narcomanta with the words "Internet Snitches" written on it. The banner was addressed to two particular blog sites that were being used to report uncensored stories about cartel violence. In addition, the administrator of the chat site, Nuevo Laredo en Vivo, which is used to share safety and security information, was killed and decapitated.

The Zetas have launched public relations campaigns through local media outlets. They determine what stories are run and threaten those who do not comply. Many reporters have been murdered and threatened, as a result the Zetas threats are taken seriously. Members of the cartel also write their own stories which are published in the papers. Their stories of disinformation include ones that discredit the Mexican army, spreading rumors about human rights abuses and exaggerating any misdemeanors by the government forces. "Demands to run propaganda will increase and content more extreme, and newspapers that run stories will go from being silent on the matter of organized crime control to being agents of disinformation helping organized crime strengthen its control over the reign." They do, however, write positive stories about local police forces, most of which are working with the Zetas in some fashion. The Zetas have infiltrated local government by bribing officers, controlling how local authorities are perceived by civilians within Zeta territory. They keep the public ignorant therefore most people trust the officers who are actually working side-by-side with the cartel.

=== Recruitment strategies ===
Adding and maintaining membership is key to winning the drug war. As a result, cartels rely on propaganda and other psychological warfare tactics to gain support and recruit new members. Cartels are extremely good at targeting high-value individuals such as police officers and border agents. These recruits are important to narco operations for they provide knowledge on vulnerabilities within the system, personnel and they are usually well trained in weapons and some even trained in torture techniques. "They are the protective shields for drug lords and neutralizing any real government action." Cartels benefit particularly from American recruits so they devote much of their resources to US officials. Americans blend in well, speak perfect English, and are familiar with the terrain, roads and local customs. One border agent that can turn away from an operation can have significant long-term effects.

Cartels also recruit "straw buyers", individuals that do not have prior criminal records to buy weapons from licensed dealers. Some buyers are housewives, mothers, cousins, kids, elderly and any families that are less suspicious. They are usually paid $100 a weapon or more.

As a new method of recruiting smugglers, cartels in Tijuana have been tricking citizens into working for them. They post "help wanted" posters throughout the city and ads in the classified section of newspapers asking for help with a small errand of driving a car to California to serve an important business organization. The drivers are usually unaware that they are smuggling drugs hidden in the car. Even if the job seems suspicious, the ad respondents follow simple instructions for a quick payment of about $500.

One of the cartels most pressed targets are the young; they can take a poor, undereducated kid and give them power and money. Cartels attack the education system and its inability to produce role models, idols, or opportunities for young adults. Cartels provide an alternative for the kids by joining the narcoculture and protracting it as life of money, power, respect, expensive cars, and exciting lifestyle. They advertise entry-level positions, paying $500 a week. These positions are filled by people that are on average 16 years old. Kids are "cheap and expendable" to the cartels. They use them as "mules" to carry drugs over the border and act as look-outs during operations. If caught, minors who are detained receive significantly shorter sentences than adults and are likely to return to the cartels after being released.

Los Zetas give kids an additional opportunity. Being a cartel with experience in paramilitary operations, they give young recruits the opportunity to join a training program much like a military boot camp. The recruits can start with operational training in surveillance and then can move up to an assassination training program. Kids that sign up are taught weaponry, martial arts, hand-to-hand combat techniques and precision targeting. They even encourage the trainees to enter paintballing contests and tournaments, asking them to report their scores. They are taught SERE (survival, evasion, resistance, and escape) methods, torture techniques and how to withstand torture, and aggressive vehicle driving skills including how to escape and drive while limiting collateral damage.

In addition, cartels have offered college scholarships to students who wish to study criminal justice, law degrees, encouraging students to become judges and go into law enforcement. They also encourage computer science or other technological related disciplines. Because of this recruitment success, "cartels are now more professionalized, hiring highly educated individuals who serve as public relations officers that recruit help of other professionals, including accountants, businessmen to lend money, law enforcement officers, doctors, and lawyers".

== Counter propaganda ==
Although journalists are being attacked and threatened for reporting, those that do report are often asked to censor their stories so as to not popularize or provoke cartel violence. Media outlets have agreed to follow measures to "avoid turning criminals into heroes or victims, as this helps build support with the population". Journalists are often urged to do anything in their power to not become an avenue or an inadvertent spokesperson for the cartels. As a result of these fears of cartel retribution and inadvertent cartel glorification, major media outlets tend to downplay or ignore cartel activities, which has in turn spurred independent sources to take it upon themselves to report on the drug war. These "cybervigilantes" use online media such as Twitter, blogs, and YouTube, which have become powerful tools to spread information about narcoculture. In 2012 the Anonymous group started unveiling names of cartel members and sympathizers, but the effort quickly lost steam. El Blog Del Narco and Mundo Narco are examples of popular uncensored sites tracking cartel violence, gang uniforms, expansions and movements, tactics, and weapons of choice. Other sites include Diario del Narco and La Policiaca.

In addition, officials have tried to eliminate the word "narco" and keep it out of everyday life. The government also came out with anti-narco comics and songs directed at kids. The Mexican government sponsored a ten episode comic series. They depicted teams of federal officers, military men, and government personnel bringing peace to Mexico by taking down the drug gangs. Each comic attempted to tackle a myth or disinformation spread about the federal government. One episode featured a father leaving the cartel and reuniting with his wife and son. They included themes to strengthen government authority by showing how government officials do not negotiate with criminals and murderers. The Mexican government uses these comics to send a message to the youths that "only through strong institutions will Mexico achieve a true and lasting security".

The Catholic Church, which is the majority religion in Mexico, also tried to help with the drug war by denouncing consumption and sale of drugs as a "capital sin". In March 2012, Pope Benedict, went to Mexico and spoke to crowds of people:

"It is the responsibility of the Church to educate consciences, to teach moral responsibility and to unmask the evil, to unmask this idolatry of money which enslaves man, to unmask the false promises, the lies, the fraud that is behind drugs."

In response to the increase of newspaper job announcements and help wanted posters, the U.S. Immigration and Customs Enforcement bought up Mexican newspaper ad space to warn civilians about the announcements. The warnings appear in the classified sections and in block black letters say, "Warning! Drug traffickers are announcing jobs for drivers to go to the United States. Don't fall victim to this trap."

In addition to newspaper ads, border patrols stream radio announcements deterring smuggling. Other counter propaganda campaigns include public service announcements, anti-narcocorridos, and short documentaries about importance of rule of law and democracy.

During the Mexican drug war, the Mexican government made concerted efforts to influence public opinion by spreading propaganda. This is increasingly done using technology and the media, such as making online animated propaganda to reach to the people and help them understand the effects organized crime. Comics, as well, are said to be "a new space for communication".

== Other means of psychological warfare ==
The drug cartels' use of propaganda also takes a psychological toll on the people of Mexico, including Mexican culture and society as a whole. Fear has permeated into the daily life of the entire country through the use of scare tactics, murders, their symbolism, and bombings. Threats are one of the drug cartels' most effective tools and the credibility behind them. When they threaten someone, they usually carry it through. Such violence includes everything from beheadings, kidnappings, assassinations, bombings, and grenade attacks. Many of the dead found show signs of torture, such as their hands tied behind their back and being set on fire. Some individuals have been daubed with axle grease and stuffed into a tank or oil drum and then set to fire. Another popular tactic is dropping victims in homemade acid. Bodies are often found dumped along the road or in mass graves. Many killings and the use of dead bodies as symbols often happen during social events when the victim least expects it. Cartels use extreme violence on bodies to portray a certain message. For example, decapitations often are supposed to show that the victim did not fulfill their job or was part of two sides of the conflict.

Some types of psychological warfare include closing of public establishments, roadblocks, and threats to public officials. Society is always aware of the drug cartels' presence, even in places where the expectation is to feel safe like in schools and medical clinics. Another way used to put fear into the Mexican people are unexpected roadblocks. It stops people like the military and the police from taking control of traffic that may as well be controlled by drug cartels. The fear that is put into the Mexican people leads to a decreased number of people putting effort into stopping the drug cartels, since most are too scared to do so. The people living through the Mexican drug war are living through constant insecurity, causing significant psychological toll on these individuals. Another part of the psychological toll on the people is the lack of freedom of speech. If an individual expresses themselves in a way that drug cartels would not appreciate, as for example writing about their secret actions, their life and the life of all their loved ones will be at risk. The ways of the Mexican people are extremely affected by this issue since it is a big part of everyday life. The culture changes significantly as well since many Mexicans live in constant fear, unable to operate some customs that was previously the way of life.

The actions that most affect the Mexican people are attacks on public spaces with a large presence of bystanders. Other than the physical damage, even more people are frightened and damaged psychologically. The goal of these different types of psychological attacks is to limit discussion of the drug cartels in mainstream society, make people fear them, and to decrease the time citizens spend outside the home.

Naturally, the cartels' most targeted group - journalists, have been influenced by fears of reprisals. In 2008, 95 journalists were attacked, 28 killed, 8 missing, and dozens more threatened.

Cartels also use bribes and extortion as a means to keeping their business running. They use the motto "plata o plomo" meaning silver or lead, creating a situation in which the victim must provide them money for protection or face death. Kidnappings have become an extortion scheme, with many cartels charging a war tax within their territory. Those who can't or won't pay the tax wil have a family member kidnapped until they can pay.

== See also ==
- Propaganda in North Korea
- Propaganda in the War in Somalia
- Propaganda in the Republic of China
