= Sergio Peña Solís =

Mexican drug lord

Sergio Peña Mendoza
- Born: Sergio Peña Mendoza; January 25, 1973 (age 53); Nuevo Laredo, Tamaulipas
- Status: Captured
- Other names: El Concord; El Colosio; René Solís Carlos; Sergio Peña Mendoza; Arturo Sánchez Fuentes; Antonio Santiago López
- Occupation: Los Zetas drug lord
- Status: Captured
- Criminal charges: Drug trafficking, murder

Sergio Peña Mendoza, also known as Sergio Peña Solís and Antonio Santiago López (born 25 January 1973) is a Mexican suspected drug lord and a former leader in the criminal group Los Zetas, then the armed side of the Gulf Cartel. He was apprehended in Reynosa, Tamaulipas, Mexico, on 14 March 2009.

The government of Mexico had listed Peña Mendoza as one of its 37 most wanted drug lords and offered the equivalent of over $2 million USD ($15 million Mexican pesos) for information leading to his capture.

== Status ==
Sergio Peña Mendoza was believed to be the new leader of the Los Zetas group in Reynosa, Mexico, after the former leader Jaime Gonzalez Duran (aka El Hummer) was arrested in the later part of 2008. Peña Solís was known as "El Concord" and used several aliases, including the names of Rene Carlos Solis and Arturo Sanchez Fuentes.

== Arrest ==
Peña Mendoza was 39 years old at the time of his capture. He was arrested after he tried to flee a police checkpoint in a stolen truck with Texas license plates. He was carrying a false ID card, and was in possession of an AK-47 rifle.

== Charges ==
According to authorities, Peña Mendoza was recently a leader in the drug cartel organization in the southern Mexican state of Chiapas where he was responsible for bribing the police in the cities of Chiapa de Corzo, Tuxtla Gutierrez, and San Cristobal de las Casas. It has been reported that, when previous Zeta leader of the city of Reynosa Jaime Gonzalez Duran was arrested, Peña Solís was sent to Reynosa to lead drug trafficking activities across the border and to fight against police measures to stop the trafficking of illegal drugs.

=== Kingpin Act sanction ===
On 24 March 2010, the United States Department of the Treasury sanctioned Peña Mendoza under the Foreign Narcotics Kingpin Designation Act (sometimes referred to simply as the "Kingpin Act"), for his involvement in drug trafficking along with fifty-three other international criminals and ten foreign entities. The act prohibited U.S. citizens and companies from doing any kind of business activity with him, and virtually froze all his assets in the U.S.

== 2006 prison escape ==
In 2003, Mexican authorities issued an arrest warrant against Peña Mendoza for drug trafficking and subsequently apprehended him and put him into custody. But, on 13 June 2006, Peña Mendoza escaped from prison with the assistance of Jaime González Durán, alias "El Hummer". Following his escape from prison, Peña Mendoza was involved in the murder-executions of the tactical head of police and a police officer in Tuxtla Gutierrez, Chiapas. Mexican police also charged him with the 25 July 2008 killing of businessman Marcos Arcia of San Cristobal De Las Casas, Chiapas, Mexico.

== Business partners ==
Peña Mendoza had an alliance with Miguel Angel Trevino Morales (aka Z-40), Daniel Perez Rojas (aka El Cachetes, which means The Cheeks), Iván Velázquez-Caballero and Sergio Basurto Pena. Peña Solís is a suspect in the failed attempt to free Zeta member Perez-Rojas who was sent to prison in Guatemala.

== Reported death ==
In early 2010, Mexican media reported that a man identified as Sergio Peña Mendoza — using the alias "El Concord" and described as Los Zetas' representative in Reynosa under leader Heriberto Lazcano — had been killed, despite having been in federal custody since his March 2009 arrest. El Universal described the killing as an unresolved precursor to the violent rupture between Los Zetas and the Gulf Cartel, noting that his re-emergence as an execution victim in the same city where he had been captured could not be readily explained by federal authorities. The same report stated that, when asked for an update on his legal status, the Attorney General's office was unable to confirm the circumstances and had only an unverified account of his death. Other accounts of the Los Zetas–Gulf Cartel split attribute the killing to Gulf Cartel enforcer Samuel Flores Borrego, alias "El Metro 3," describing the death of "El Concord" as a flashpoint that fueled the alliance's collapse.

The killing is cited as a direct catalyst for the collapse of the alliance between Los Zetas and the Gulf Cartel. At the end of 2010 Los Zetas broke the peace they had maintained with the Gulf Cartel because of the death of Sergio Peña Mendoza — referred to in that report as "El Concord" — which triggered a dispute over the territories controlled by Gulf Cartel leaders Jorge Eduardo Costilla Sánchez ("El Coss") and Ezequiel Cárdenas Guillén ("Tony Tormenta"). El Universal similarly described the killing as an unresolved precursor to the break between Los Zetas leader Heriberto Lazcano ("El Lazca") and his former allies El Coss and Tony Tormenta. The rupture is widely regarded as the start of the broader Los Zetas–Gulf Cartel conflict of 2010, which reshaped organized crime in northeastern Mexico for years afterward.

== See also ==
- List of Mexico's 37 most-wanted drug lords
