= Francisco Hernández García =

- Other names: El 2000; El Panchillo
- Employer: Beltrán Leyva Cartel (drug cartel)
- Known for: Leader in the Beltrán Leyva Cartel
- Title: Drug lord

Notes
- Status: Captured

Francisco Hernández García (alias "El 2000", "El Panchillo") is a Mexican drug lord of the Beltrán Leyva Cartel. He was captured on 4 November 2011. The United States Department of Justice also had charges against Hernández García.

== See also ==
- List of Mexico's 37 most-wanted drug lords
