= Héctor Huerta Ríos =

Mexican drug lord

Héctor Huerta-Ríos
- Died: July 4, 2019
- Other names: La Burra
- Employer: Beltrán Leyva Cartel
- Title: Drug lord

Héctor Huerta Ríos, also known by his nickname La Burra (English: The Donkey), was a Mexican suspected drug lord and high-ranking member of the Beltran-Leyva Cartel, a criminal group based in Sinaloa. Huerta-Rios was the leader of the organization's operations in the city of Monterrey. On March 24, 2009 the Mexican Military arrested Huerta Rios at his luxury car dealership in San Pedro Garza Garcia along with his four bodyguards. Also seized were numerous weapons, including two AK-47s, one AR-15, grenades and several pistols. Eighteen luxury vehicles, 8,000 Mexican pesos and $12,840 in US Dollars.

Huerta Rios was reported killed on July 4, 2019.

== See also ==
- List of Mexico's 37 most-wanted drug lords
