= Guadalupe García Almanza =

Mexican politician

- Born: 28 May 1960 (age 65); Oaxaca, Mexico
- Occupation: Politician
- Political party: MC

María Guadalupe García Almanza (born 28 May 1960) is a Mexican politician from the Citizens' Movement. From 2009 to 2012 she served as Deputy of the LXI Legislature of the Mexican Congress representing Oaxaca.
