= Raymundo Almanza Morales =

Mexican drug lord of Los Zetas

- Raymundo Almanza Morales
- Other names: El Gori III
- Occupation: Drug lord
- Employers: Mexican Army (????–1999); Los Zetas
- Known for: Leader in Los Zetas

Raymundo Almanza Morales (alias El Gori III) is a Mexican suspected drug lord and former high-ranking member of Los Zetas, a criminal group based in Tamaulipas, Mexico. Almanza Morales was in the Mexican Armed Forces prior to his involvement in organized crime. He was an infantry soldier and was discharged on August 14, 1999, at his own request. He was captured on 22 May 2009 in Monterrey, Nuevo Leon, Mexico.

== See also ==
- List of Mexico's 37 most-wanted drug lords
