= 2009 Mexico most-wanted drug lords =

On 23 March 2009, federal authorities in Mexico published a list of the country's most-wanted drug lords. According to a BBC Mundo Mexico report, the 37 people listed "have jeopardized Mexico national security."

This list of drug lords is grouped by their associated cartels. As of 2009, Mexico had offered up to 30 million pesos (about US$3.33 million today) for the capture of each of the fugitives. The United States also offers rewards for two of them.

The most-wanted of the 37 drug lords was Joaquín "El Chapo" Guzmán Loera, for whom Mexican and U.S. governments offered a total bounty of US$7 million. He was captured on 22 February 2014 in Mazatlán, Sinaloa, where he was staying at a hotel. He escaped on 11 July 2015 through a 1.5 kilometer long tunnel from his cell in the Mexican maximum security prison but was recaptured by Mexican Marines following a gun battle on 8 January 2016.

== Chronology ==
As of 18 January 2011, Mexico had captured or killed 20 of the 37 in the most-wanted list. The 21 June 2011 arrest of José de Jesús Méndez Vargas, a.k.a. "El Chango", brought the total to twenty-one captured or killed. On 4 November 2011, Francisco Hernández García was captured. A leader of the Zetas drug cartel, Raúl Hernández Lechuga was captured on 12 December 2011. On 26 September 2012, Iván Velázquez Caballero was captured by Mexican security forces. The 7 October 2012 killing of Heriberto Lazcano brought this total to 25 captured or killed so far.

On 15 July 2013, Miguel Treviño Morales was apprehended by the Mexican Marines in a town called Anáhuac, Nuevo León, near the border of the state of Tamaulipas. Then, the 27 January 2014 apprehension of Dionisio Loya Plancarte, a.k.a. "El Tío" left the Mexican government with 10 fugitives still on the loose. On 23 June 2014, Fernando Sánchez Arellano was arrested by soldiers of the Mexican Army and federal agents of the Procuraduría General de la República (PGR) at the La Mesa borough of Tijuana, Baja California. On 1 October 2014 Héctor Beltrán Leyva was arrested by the Mexican Army inside a restaurant in San Miguel de Allende, Guanajuato. On 9 October 2014, Vicente Carrillo Fuentes was arrested by Mexican authorities in Torreón (Coahuila). On 27 February 2015, Servando Gómez Martínez, the leader of the Knights Templar cartel, was arrested by Mexican security forces in Morelia, Michoacán. On 4 March 2015, Omar Treviño Morales was captured inside a residence in Fuentes del Valle, an upper-class neighborhood in San Pedro Garza García, Nuevo León, by the Federal Police and the Mexican Army. On 8 January 2016, Mexican Marines recaptured Joaquín Guzmán Loera after a heavy firefight in the city of Los Mochis, Sinaloa. On 25 July 2024, Ismael "El Mayo" Zambada, the last remaining drug lord yet to be arrested, incarcerated, or killed, surrendered to U.S. authorities, bringing the total captured or killed to 34.

== Grouped by drug cartels ==
The list of wanted individuals Mexican authorities offered 30 million pesos for in 2009 (equivalent to about US$3.33 million today) breaks down as follows:

=== Beltrán-Leyva Cartel ===
- Arturo Beltrán Leyva, a.k.a. "Jefe de Jefes," "El Barbas," "El Botas Blancas," "La Muerte" – Killed on 16 December 2009
- Héctor Beltrán Leyva, a.k.a. "El Ingeniero," "El H," "El General" – Captured on 1 October 2014 – Died on 18 November 2018
- Héctor Huerta Ríos, a.k.a. "La Burra," "El Junior" – Captured on 25 March 2009 – Killed on 4 July 2019
- Sergio Villarreal Barragán, a.k.a. "El Grande" "Comeniños," "King Kong" – Captured on 13 September 2010
- Edgar Valdez Villarreal, a.k.a. "La Barbie," "El Comandante", "El Güero" – Captured on 31 August 2010

=== La Familia Michoacana/Knights Templar Cartel ===
- Nazario Moreno González, a.k.a. "El Chayo," "El Doctor," "El Más Loco" – Killed on 9 March 2014
- Servando Gómez Martínez, a.k.a. "El Profe," "La Tuta" – Captured on 27 February 2015
- José de Jesús Méndez Vargas, a.k.a. "El Chango" – Captured on 21 June 2011
- Dionisio Loya Plancarte, a.k.a. "El Tío" – Captured on 27 January 2014

=== Gulf Cartel ===
- Jorge Eduardo Costilla Sánchez, a.k.a. "El Coss" – Captured on 12 September 2012
- Ezequiel Cárdenas Guillén, a.k.a. "Tony Tormenta" – Killed on 5 November 2010
- Sigifredo Nájera Talamantes, a.k.a. "El Canicón" – Captured on 23 March 2009 – Died on 7 September 2015
- Sergio Enrique Ruiz Tlapanco, a.k.a. "El Tlapa" – Captured on 8 September 2009

=== Juárez Cartel ===
- Vicente Carrillo Fuentes, a.k.a. "El Viceroy," "El General" – Captured on 9 October 2014
- Vicente Carrillo Leyva, a.k.a. "El Ingeniero" – Captured on 1 April 2009
- Juan Pablo Ledezma, a.k.a. "El JL"

=== Sinaloa Cartel ===
- Joaquín Guzmán Loera, a.k.a. "El Chapo" – Captured on 22 February 2014 – Escaped on 11 July 2015 – Recaptured on 8 January 2016
- Ismael Zambada García, a.k.a. "El Mayo," "El M-Z," "El Padrino" – Captured on 25 July 2024
- Ignacio Coronel Villarreal, a.k.a. "El Nacho" – Killed on 29 July 2010
- Juan José Esparragoza Moreno, a.k.a. "El Azul" – Allegedly died on 7 June 2014
- Vicente Zambada Niebla, a.k.a. "El Vicentillo" – Captured on 19 March 2009

=== Tijuana Cartel ===
- Teodoro García Simental, a.k.a. "El Teo," "El Lalo," "El Alamo," "El K-1," "El Tres Letras" – Captured on 12 January 2010
- Fernando Sánchez Arellano, a.k.a. "El Ingeniero," "El Alineador" – Captured on 23 June 2014
- Benjamín Arellano Félix a.k.a. "El Min," – Captured on 9 March 2002
- Ramón Arellano Félix a.k.a. "El Commandante Món" "Món" "Colores" – Killed on 10 February 2002

=== Los Zetas ===
- Heriberto Lazcano Lazcano, a.k.a. "El Lazca," "Z-3", "El Verdugo" (English: "The Executioner"), "El Bronce," "El Pitirijas," "Licenciado" – Killed on 7 October 2012
- Miguel Ángel Treviño Morales, a.k.a. "Z-40" ("40," "Cuarenta," "Comandante 40") – Captured on 15 July 2013
- Omar Treviño Morales, a.k.a. "Z-42" – Captured on 4 March 2015
- Iván Velázquez Caballero, a.k.a. "El Talibán," "Z-50" – Captured on 26 September 2012
- Gregorio Sauceda Gamboa, a.k.a. "El Goyo," "Metro-2," "Caramuela" – Captured on 30 April 2009
- Alberto Pineda Villa, a.k.a. "El Borrado" – Killed on 12 September 2009
- Marco Antonio Pineda Villa, a.k.a. "El MP" – Killed on 12 September 2009
- Ricardo Almanza Morales, a.k.a. "El Gori I" – Killed on 4 December 2009
- Eduardo Almanza Morales, a.k.a. "El Gori II"
- Raymundo Almanza Morales, a.k.a. "El Gori III" – Captured on 22 May 2009
- Flavio Méndez Santiago, a.k.a. "El Amarillo" – Captured on 18 January 2011
- Sergio Peña Solís, a.k.a. "El Concord," "El Colosio" – Captured on 14 March 2009
- Raúl Lucio Hernández Lechuga, a.k.a. "El Lucky" – Captured 12 December 2011

== Sortable table ==
No.	Cartel	Name	Alias	Reward (Mexican pesos)	Status	Date of status	Notes
1	Beltrán-Leyva	Arturo Beltrán Leyva	El Barbas	$30M	Killed	16 December 2009	
2	Beltrán-Leyva	Héctor Beltrán Leyva	El General	$30M	Captured	1 October 2014	
3	Beltrán-Leyva	Sergio Villarreal Barragán	El Grande	$30M	Captured	13 September 2010	
4	Beltrán-Leyva	Edgar Valdez Villarreal	La Barbie	$30M	Captured	31 August 2010	
5	Beltrán-Leyva	Francisco Hernández García	El 2000	$15M	Captured	4 November 2011	
6	Beltrán-Leyva	Alberto Pineda Villa	El Borrado	$15M	Killed	12 September 2009	
7	Beltrán-Leyva	Marco Antonio Pineda Villa	El MP	$15M	Killed	12 September 2009	
8	Beltrán-Leyva	Héctor Huerta Ríos	La Burra	$15M	Captured	25 March 2009	
9	La Familia Michoacana	Nazario Moreno González	El Chayo	$30M	Killed	9 March 2014	
10	La Familia Michoacana	Servando Gómez Martínez	La Tuta	$30M	Captured	27 February 2015	
11	La Familia Michoacana	José de Jesús Méndez Vargas	El Chango	$30M	Captured	21 June 2011	
12	La Familia Michoacana	Dionisio Loya Plancarte	El Tío	$30M	Captured	27 January 2014	
13	Los Zetas	Heriberto Lazcano Lazcano	Z-3	$30M	Killed	7 October 2012	
14	Los Zetas	Raúl Lucio Hernández Lechuga	El Lucky	$15M	Captured	12 December 2011	
15	Los Zetas	Sergio Peña Solís	El Concord	$15M	Captured	14 March 2009	
16	Los Zetas	Miguel Ángel Treviño Morales	Z-40	$30M	Captured	15 July 2013	
17	Los Zetas	Omar Treviño Morales	L-42	$30M	Captured	4 March 2015	
18	Los Zetas	Iván Velázquez Caballero	L-50	$30M	Captured	26 September 2012	
19	Los Zetas	Gregorio Sauceda Gamboa	El Goyo	$30M	Captured	30 April 2009	
20	Los Zetas	Flavio Méndez Santiago	El Amarillo	$15M	Captured	18 January 2011	
21	Los Zetas	Ricardo Almanza Morales	El Gori I	$15M	Killed	4 December 2009	
22	Los Zetas	Eduardo Almanza Morales	El Gori II	$15M	Allegedly dead	4 December 2009	
23	Los Zetas	Raymundo Almanza Morales	El Gori III	$15M	Captured	22 May 2009	
24	Gulf Cartel	Sigifredo Nájera Talamantes	El Canicón	$15M	Captured	23 March 2009	
25	Gulf Cartel	Ezequiel Cárdenas Guillén	Tony Tormenta	$30M	Killed	5 November 2010	
26	Gulf Cartel	Jorge Eduardo Costilla Sánchez	El Coss	$30M	Captured	12 September 2012	
27	Gulf Cartel	Sergio Enrique Ruiz Tlapanco	El Tlapa	$15M	Captured	8 September 2009	
28	Juárez Cartel	Vicente Carrillo Fuentes	El Viceroy	$30M	Captured	9 October 2014	
29	Juárez Cartel	Vicente Carrillo Leyva	El Ingeniero	$30M	Captured	1 April 2009	
30	Juárez Cartel	Juan Pablo Ledezma	El JL	$15M	Disputed (reportedly killed or fugitive)	No longer reported as the leader of La Línea by 2020	Bounty for his death was offered by El Chapo.
31	Sinaloa Cartel	Joaquín Guzmán Loera	El Chapo	$30M	Captured	8 January 2016	
32	Sinaloa Cartel	Ismael Zambada García	El Mayo Zambada	$30M	Captured	25 July 2024	
33	Sinaloa Cartel	Ignacio Coronel Villarreal	El Nacho Coronel	$30M	Killed	29 July 2010	
34	Sinaloa Cartel	Juan José Esparragoza Moreno	El Azul	$30M	Allegedly dead	7 June 2014	
35	Sinaloa Cartel	Vicente Zambada Niebla	El Vicentillo	$30M	Captured	19 March 2009	
36	Tijuana Cartel	Teodoro García Simental	El Teo	$30M	Captured	12 January 2010	
37	Tijuana Cartel	Fernando Sánchez Arellano	El Ingeniero	$30M	Captured	23 June 2014	

== See also ==
- List of fugitives from justice who disappeared
- List of Mexican cartels
- Mexican drug war
- Timeline of the Mexican drug war

Policing

- Rurales
- Federales
- Grupo de Operaciones Especiales (Mexico)
- Mérida Initiative
- Attorney General of Mexico (Procuraduría General de la República)

General

- Crime in Mexico
- FBI Ten Most Wanted Fugitives
