= Raúl Lucio Hernández Lechuga =

Mexican drug lord

- Born: February 8, 1976 (age 50); Hidalgo, Mexico or Piedras Negras, Coahuila, Mexico
- Other names: El Lucky, Z-16
- Occupation: Los Zetas founder
- Status: Extradited to the United States
- Criminal charges: Drug trafficking, money laundering

Raúl Lucio Hernández Lechuga, alias El Lucky and Z-16, is a Mexican former drug lord. He had been in the army from 1996 to 1997 and later was one of the founders of the group Los Zetas. The government of Mexico had listed Hernández Lechuga as one of its 37 most wanted drug lords and offered the equivalent of over $2 million USD for information leading to his capture. In February 2025, he was extradited to the United States.

== Kingpin Act sanction ==
On 24 March 2010, the United States Department of the Treasury sanctioned Hernánez Lechuga under the Foreign Narcotics Kingpin Designation Act, sometimes referred to simply as the "Kingpin Act", for his involvement in drug trafficking along with fifty three other international criminals and ten foreign entities. The act prohibited U.S. citizens and companies from business activities with him, and froze all his assets in the U.S.

== Arrest ==
He was apprehended in Córdoba, Veracruz on 12 December 2011, and was believed to have controlled operations for Los Zetas in 10 states in Mexico. In addition, one of his bodyguards was killed; authorities also found 133 rifles, five grenade launchers, 29 grenades and 36 pistols at the scene of the raid. SEMAR also found bulletproof vests with the letter "Z", the Zetas symbol, on the front. After his arrest, Zetas leader Fernando Martínez Magaña (alias "Z-16") took his place in the organization. He was arrested by Mexican law enforcement, however, on 15 May 2014.

== Extradition to the United States ==
On 27 February 2025, Hernánez Lechuga along with 28 other narco figures were extradited to the United States.

== See also ==
- List of Mexico's 37 most-wanted drug lords
