= Sergio Enrique Ruiz Tlapanco =

Mexican drug lord

- Born: 8 October 1972 (age 53); Mexico
- Other name: Z-44, El Tlapa
- Employers: Mexican Army (1988–1999); Federal Judicial Police (1997–1999); Los Zetas (suspected)
- Criminal charges: Drug trafficking, money laundering, assault
- Capture status: Incarcerated

Sergio Enrique Ruiz Tlapanco (born 8 October 1972) is a Mexican suspected drug lord and high-ranking member of Los Zetas, a criminal group based in Tamaulipas, Mexico.

== Early life and career ==
Sergio Enrique Ruiz Tlapanco was born on 8 October 1972 in Mexico. He joined the Mexican Army on 6 March 1988. While serving in the military, he was assigned as an officer of the Federal Judicial Police (PJF) from 1997 to 1999. He was based in Coahuila and had a C rank as an agent. On 16 November 1999, he requested his release from the military.

== Arrest ==
He was captured on September 9, 2009. The government of Mexico had listed Ruiz Tlapanco as one of its 37 most-wanted drug lords and offered the equivalent of over $1 million USD for information leading to his capture.

== Kingpin Act sanction ==
On 24 March 2010, the United States Department of the Treasury sanctioned Ruiz-Tlapanco under the Foreign Narcotics Kingpin Designation Act (sometimes referred to simply as the "Kingpin Act"), for his involvement in drug trafficking along with fifty-three other international criminals and ten foreign entities. The act prohibited U.S. citizens and companies from doing any kind of business activity with him, and virtually froze all his assets in the U.S.

== See also ==
- List of Mexico's 37 most-wanted drug lords
