= Reynosa =

- City
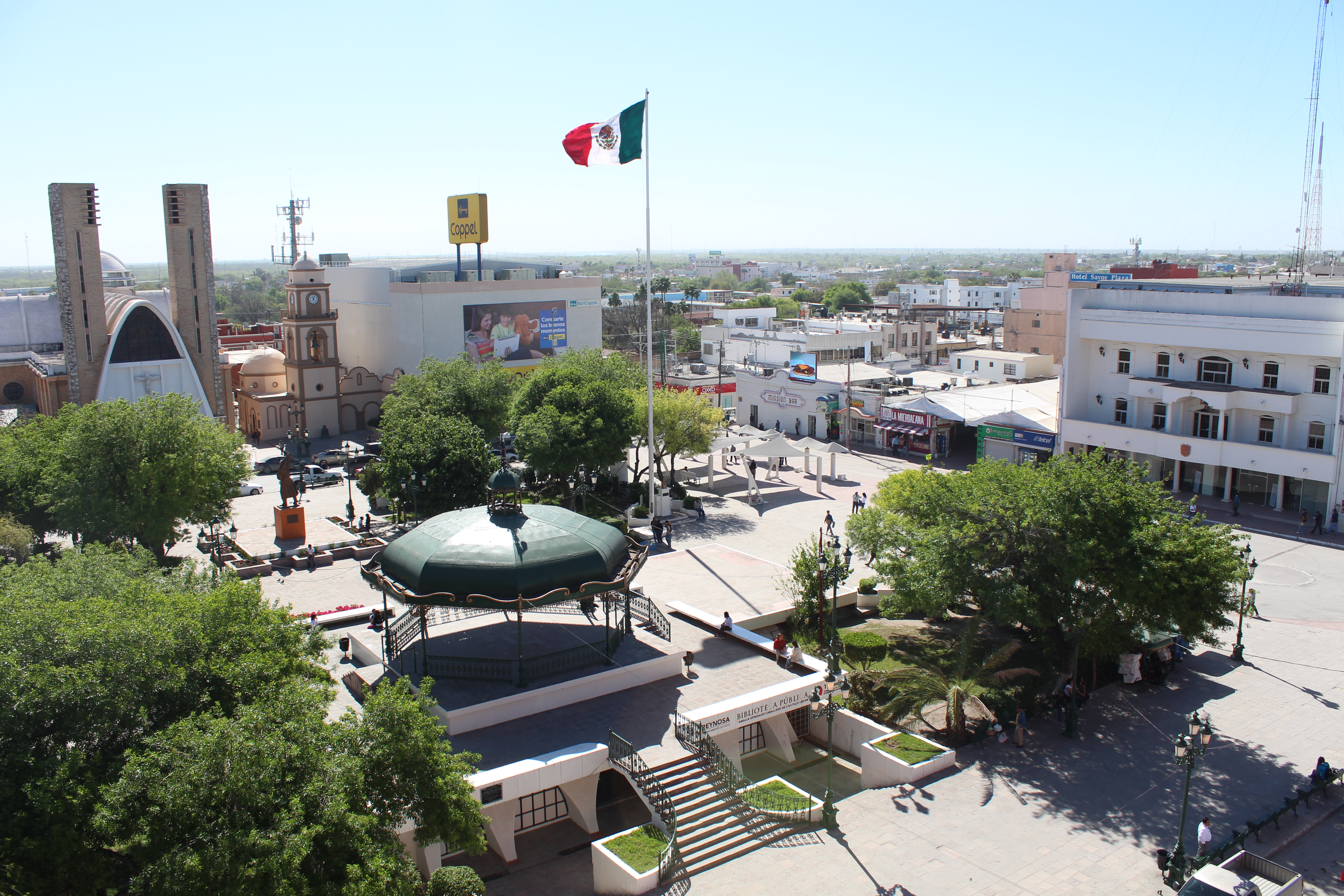
- Main Plaza of Reynosa

- Coat of arms
- Nickname: Metrópolis industrial de Tamaulipas
- Motto: Trabajar por la patria es forjar nuestro destino (To work for the motherland is to forge our destiny)
- Location within Tamaulipas Location within Mexico
- Coordinates: 26°05′32″N 98°16′40″W
- Country: Mexico
- State: Tamaulipas
- Municipality: Reynosa Municipality
- Founded: 14 March 1749
- Founded as: Villa de Nuestra Señora de Guadalupe de Reinosa
- Founder: Carlos Cantú González

Government
  - Mayor: Carlos Víctor Peña Ortiz (2021–present) (MORENA PT)

Area
  - City: 3,156 km^{2} (1,219 sq mi)
- Elevation: 33 m (108 ft)

Population (2020)
  - City: 691,557
  - Metro: 837,251

GDP (PPP, constant 2015 values)
  - Year: 2023
  - Total: $23.5 billion
  - Per capita: $24,700
- Time zone: UTC−06:00 (Zona Centro)
  - Summer (DST): UTC−05:00 (DST)
- Postal code: 88500
- Area code: +52 899
- Website: www.reynosa.gob.mx
- Area Code 899 Airport; General Lucio Blanco International Airport Airport Code; REX

Reynosa (Spanish pronunciation: [rejˈnosa]) is the municipal seat of Reynosa Municipality and the largest city of the state of Tamaulipas, in Mexico.

The border city is located on the southern bank of the Rio Grande in the international Reynosa–McAllen metro area, directly across the Mexican border from Hidalgo, Texas.

As of 2025, the city of Reynosa has a population of 691,557. If the floating population is included, the total can reach approximately 1,000,000.

== History ==
On 6 July 1686, Agustín Echeverz y Zuvízar, governor of the Nuevo Reino de León, camped in what is now Reynosa during an exploratory expedition.

In December 1748, an expedition led by José de Escandón y Helguera left from Querétaro, planning to establish 14 villages; the caravan consisted of 1500 colonists and 755 soldiers.

On 14 March 1749, was founded (in its original location) the Villa de Nuestra Señora de Guadalupe de Reynosa, by the captain Carlos Cantú on behalf of Escandón, being as well in political and military command. There were 279 pioneer residents in the charge of Friar Agustín Fragoso.

The city was named Reynosa after Reinosa, birthplace of the viceroy Juan Francisco de Güemes y Horcasitas.

In August 1750, the first flood was documented in the village.

In April 1757, Reynosa had it first political conflict, when Escandón dismissed Carlos Cantú as the mayor of the village, replacing him by Pedro de Estrada, second mayor of Reynosa.

On 9 July 1757, arrives to the village the captain José Tineda y Cuervo and the engineer Agustín López, both viceroyalty inspectors, to do a population census according to which Reynosa had 280 inhabitants.

As a result of the census, they obtained authorization from the King of Spain to move the village to a placed named Santa María de las Lajas, which was not done because Escandón didn't consider the river a flooding risk anymore.

In September 1800, an immense flood occurred. The village was inundated and the villagers used canoes and rafts to arrive to the hills of El Morrillo. In 1802, the village moved to its current location and the new census showed 1631 inhabitants.

In 1810, the building of the old church Nuestra Señora de Guadalupe began, by the parish priest Don José Cárdenas; it was finished in 1815 by Don Lorenzo Treviño.

In 1846, Reynosa was invaded by the American army during the Mexican-American war. On 10 May 1910, General Lucio Blanco with the constitutional army took Reynosa during the Mexican revolution.

On 24 November 1926, Reynosa became a city.

=== Current ===
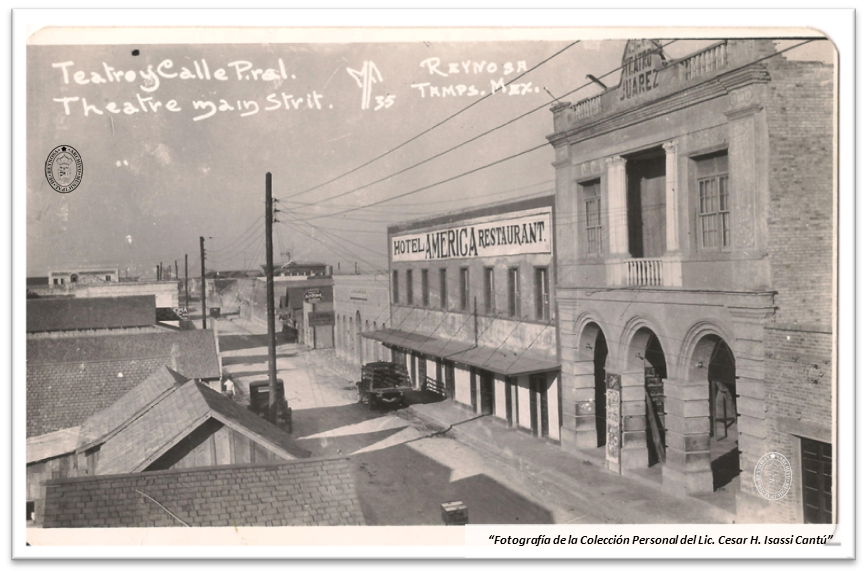
Hidalgo Street in early 20th century

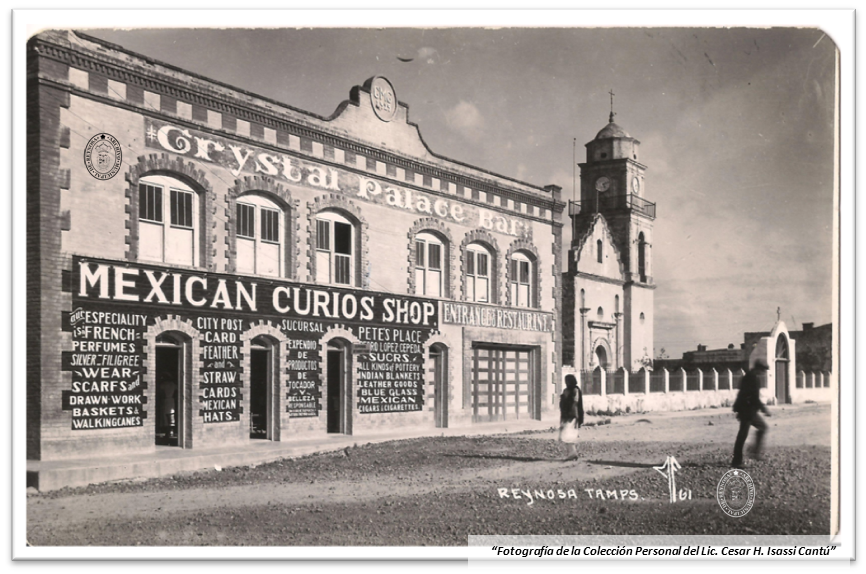
Main plaza in early 20th century

Reynosa extends across 3,156.34 sq kilometers (1218.66 sq. miles), representing 3.7 per cent of the Tamaulipas territory. Today it is the location of several satellite U.S. companies doing business to take advantage of low labor rates and industry incentives.

On 18 September 2012, an explosion at the nearby Pemex gas plant killed 30 and injured 46 people. Pemex Director Juan Jose Suarez said that there was "no evidence that it was a deliberate incident, or some kind of attack".

In 2017, it was described as a major hotspot in the Mexican drug war, as a result of the internecine wars between the Gulf and Los Zetas drugs cartels. Reynosa also has a Plaza Sendero.

== Geography ==
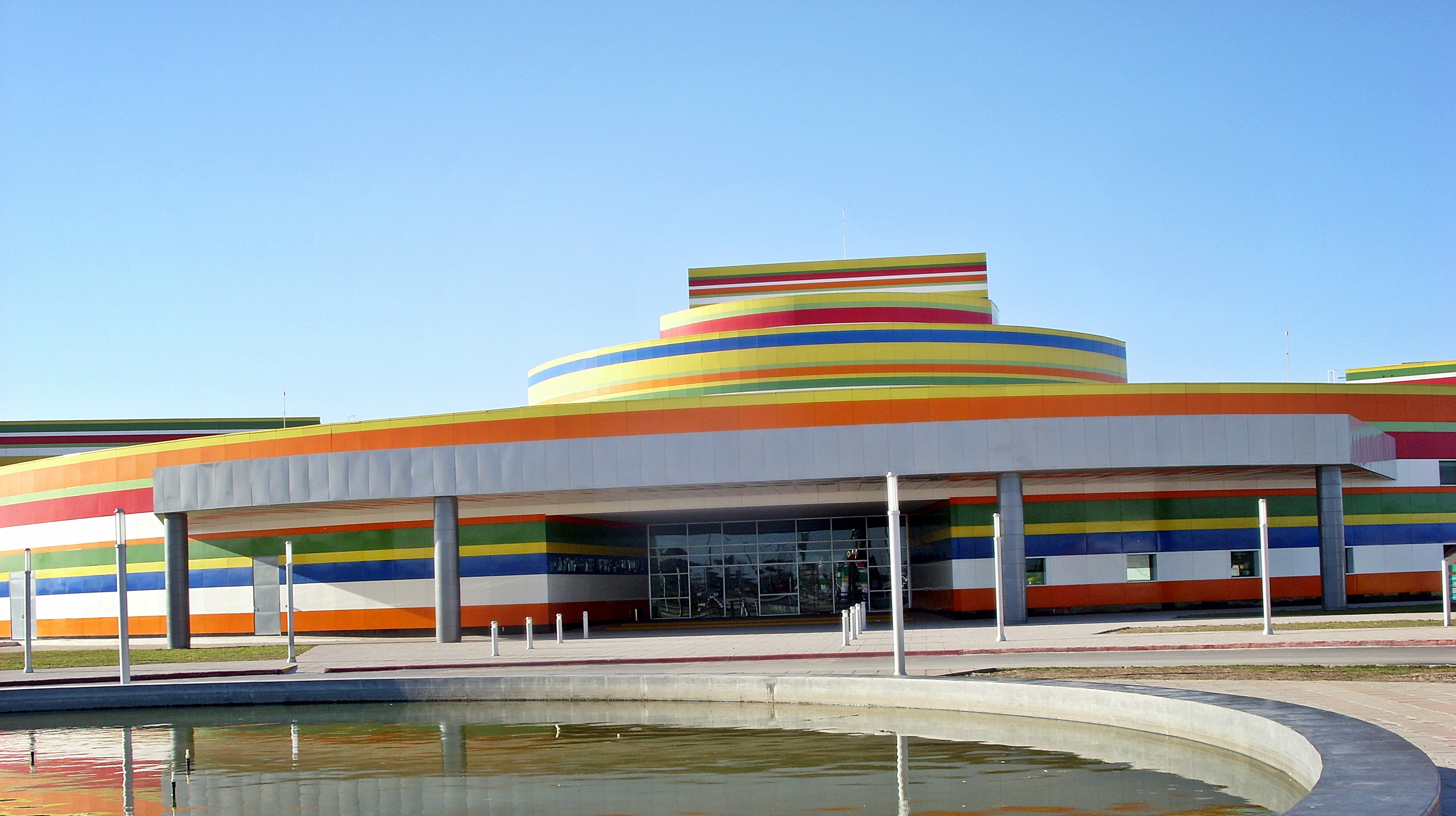
Reynosa Cultural Park

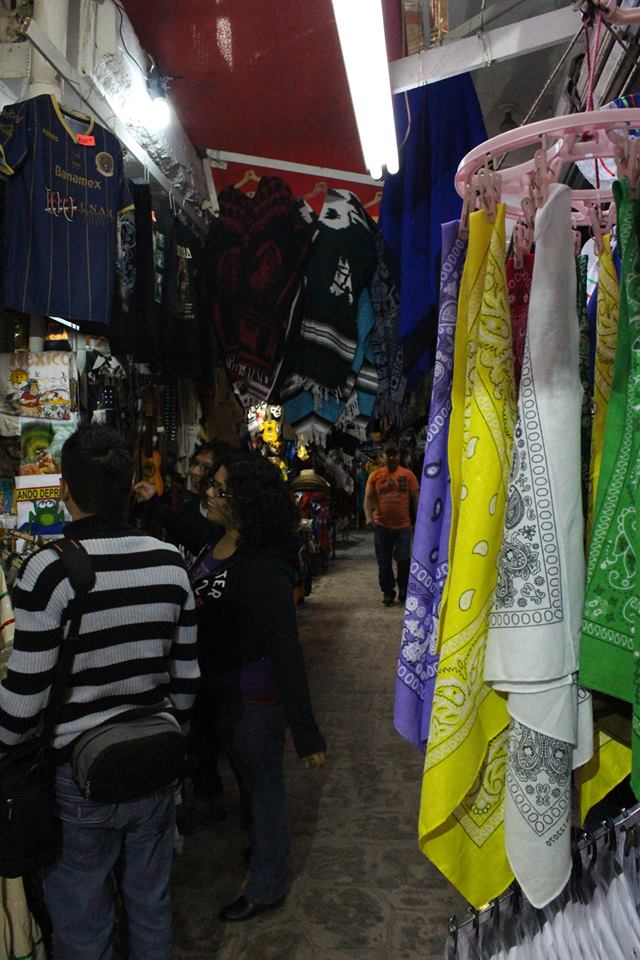
Zaragoza public market

Reynosa is the largest and most populous city in the state of Tamaulipas, followed by Matamoros, Nuevo Laredo, Ciudad Victoria, Tampico, and Río Bravo. In addition, the international Reynosa–McAllen Metropolitan Area has a population of 1,500,000 inhabitants, making it the third largest metropolitan area in the Mexico–U.S. border after San Diego–Tijuana and El Paso–Juárez. Reynosa is the 30th largest city in Mexico and anchors the largest metropolitan area in Tamaulipas.

In 2011, Reynosa was the fastest growing city in the state of Tamaulipas, and was among the top five fastest growing cities in Mexico.

The city is about 11 miles (18 km) south of McAllen, Texas.

=== Climate ===
Reynosa has a semi-arid climate (Köppen climate classification BSh) with short, mild winters and hot summers. Winters are mild and dry with a January high of 22 °C (72 °F) and a low of 11 °C (52 °F) although temperatures can fall below 10 °C (50 °F). Summers are hot with a July mean of 30 °C (86 °F) and temperatures can exceed 40 °C (104 °F) anytime from May until August. The average annual precipitation is 452 millimetres (18 in), with most of it being concentrated in the summer months though the months of May and June are the wettest.

Climate data for Reynosa (1991–2020)
Month	Jan	Feb	Mar	Apr	May	Jun	Jul	Aug	Sep	Oct	Nov	Dec	Year
Record high °C (°F)	36.0 (96.8)	39.0 (102.2)	44.0 (111.2)	42.5 (108.5)	44.0 (111.2)	45.0 (113.0)	43.0 (109.4)	43.5 (110.3)	42.0 (107.6)	39.0 (102.2)	38.0 (100.4)	36.5 (97.7)	45.0 (113.0)
Mean daily maximum °C (°F)	21.8 (71.2)	24.2 (75.6)	27.8 (82.0)	31.1 (88.0)	33.7 (92.7)	36.1 (97.0)	36.7 (98.1)	37.2 (99.0)	34.1 (93.4)	30.7 (87.3)	26.2 (79.2)	22.4 (72.3)	31.0 (87.8)
Daily mean °C (°F)	16.4 (61.5)	18.5 (65.3)	21.9 (71.4)	25.1 (77.2)	27.8 (82.0)	30.0 (86.0)	30.5 (86.9)	30.8 (87.4)	28.5 (83.3)	25.0 (77.0)	20.7 (69.3)	17.3 (63.1)	24.1 (75.4)
Mean daily minimum °C (°F)	11.0 (51.8)	12.8 (55.0)	15.9 (60.6)	19.1 (66.4)	21.9 (71.4)	23.8 (74.8)	24.2 (75.6)	24.3 (75.7)	22.8 (73.0)	19.3 (66.7)	15.1 (59.2)	12.1 (53.8)	17.7 (63.9)
Record low °C (°F)	−7.0 (19.4)	−6.0 (21.2)	−1.0 (30.2)	5.0 (41.0)	9.0 (48.2)	12.0 (53.6)	15.5 (59.9)	14.0 (57.2)	11.0 (51.8)	4.0 (39.2)	−2.0 (28.4)	−7.0 (19.4)	−7.0 (19.4)
Average precipitation mm (inches)	29.6 (1.17)	26.8 (1.06)	28.5 (1.12)	33.4 (1.31)	62.1 (2.44)	68.3 (2.69)	49.6 (1.95)	61.2 (2.41)	93.4 (3.68)	61.7 (2.43)	27.9 (1.10)	22.1 (0.87)	564.3 (22.22)
Source: Servicio Meteorológico Nacional

== Notable people ==
- Abraham Ancer – Professional golfer
- Xavier Baez – Footballer
- Jorge Cantú – Major League Baseball player
- Christian Chávez – Singer and actor
- Laura Flores – Actress, hostess and singer
- Jaime Garcia – Major League Baseball player
- Néstor Garza – Former WBA World Super Bantamweight Champion
- José María Cantú Garza – Geneticist
- Vidal Medina – Playwright and theatre director
- Los Relámpagos del Norte – Musical duo
- Komander – Wrestler
- Beto Quintanilla – Artist
- Sergio Peña Solís – Mexican drug lord (Los Zetas Cartel)

== Transportation ==
Reynosa is served by the General Lucio Blanco International Airport, which has flights to multiple important Mexican cities on six airlines, some serving it with aircraft such as Boeing 737 and Airbus A320.

In addition, the McAllen Miller International Airport in McAllen, Texas, is also relatively close and is served by airlines like Allegiant Air, American and United.
