= Los Zetas =

Mexican criminal syndicate

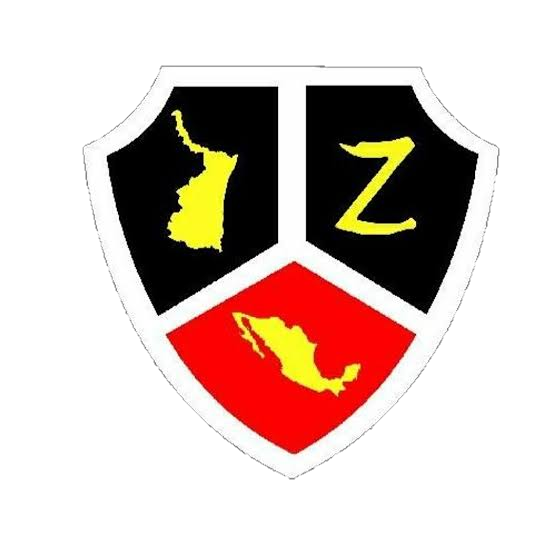
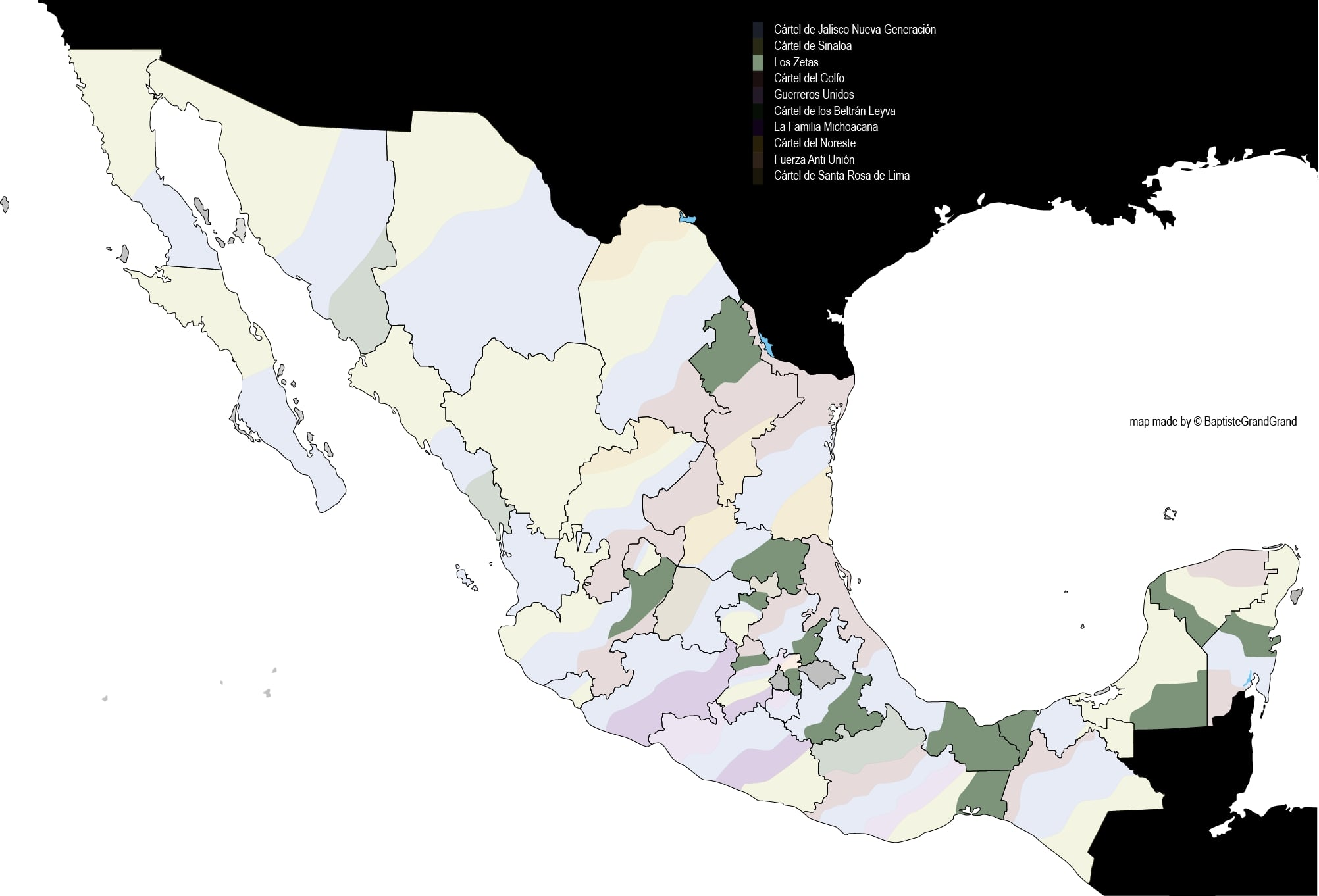
- Los Zetas presence in Mexico (2020)
- Founded by: Osiel Cárdenas Guillén; Arturo Guzmán Decena †
- Founding location: Matamoros, Tamaulipas
- Years active: 1997–2010s/present (splinter factions)
- Territory: Mexico: Tamaulipas, Nuevo Leon, Coahuila, Veracruz, Tabasco, Campeche, Yucatán, Quintana Roo, San Luis Potosí, Chiapas, Puebla, Tlaxcala, Hidalgo, Guerrero, Oaxaca, Guanajuato, Zacatecas, Aguascalientes, Michoacán, State of México Rest of North America: United States, Guatemala, El Salvador, Honduras, Costa Rica, Nicaragua, and Dominica South America: Colombia, Peru, Panama, and Venezuela Europe: Balkans, France, Germany, Italy, Spain, Portugal, European Union, Norway, Switzerland, Liechtenstein, Moldova, San Marino and Estonia
- Ethnicity: Multi-ethnic, but mainly Mexican and Latino
- Membership (est.): 4,700 (2022)
- Leader: Maxiley Barahona Nadales
- Criminal activities: Drug trafficking, human trafficking, arms trafficking, murder, rape, kidnapping, racketeering, extortion, arson, hacking, video piracy, prostitution, theft, terrorism and narcoterrorism.
- Allies: Tijuana Cartel; Juárez Cartel 'Ndrangheta; Los Mazatlecos; Barrio Azteca; MS-13; Texas Syndicate; Triad; The Office of Envigado; La Línea; Hezbollah; Sicilian Mafia; Los Zetas Group Bravo
- Rivals: Sinaloa Cartel; Knights Templar Cartel (Defunct); Jalisco New Generation Cartel; Gulf Cartel; La Mayiza

Los Zetas (pronounced [los ˈsetas], Spanish for "The Zs") is a fractured Mexican criminal syndicate and designated terrorist organization, known as one of the most dangerous of Mexico's drug cartels. They are known for engaging in brutally violent "shock and awe" tactics such as beheadings, torture, and indiscriminate murder. While primarily concerned with drug trafficking, the organization also ran profitable sex and gun rackets. Los Zetas also operated through protection rackets, assassinations, extortion, kidnappings and other illegal activities. Although the organization was founded in Matamoros, Tamaulipas, they eventually established themselves in Nuevo Laredo, directly across the border from Laredo in Texas during the mid-2000s. The origins of Los Zetas date back to the late 1990s, when commandos of the Mexican Army deserted their ranks and began working as the enforcement arm of the Gulf Cartel. In February 2010, Los Zetas broke away and formed their own criminal organization, rivalling the Gulf Cartel.

They were at one point Mexico's largest and most expansionist drug cartel in terms of geographical presence, overtaking their rivals, the Sinaloa Cartel, in physical territory. However, since the mid/late 2010s Los Zetas have become fragmented and seen its influence diminish, with most factions absorbed by their regional opposition or eliminated. As of March 2016, Grupo Bravo (Bravo Group), Los Talibanes (The Talibans), and Zetas Vieja Escuela (Old School Zetas) had formed an alliance with the Gulf Cartel against Cártel del Noreste (Cartel of the Northeast).

Although fragmented, the Zetas' and Gulf Cartel's smaller offshoots, with their power struggles, continue to create a situation of extreme violence in their home state of Tamaulipas. As of 2025, The U.S. Department of State lists Tamaulipas alongside five other states in Mexico with a Level 4: Do Not Travel advisory.

== History ==
=== Etymology ===
Los Zetas was named after its first commander, Arturo Guzmán Decena, whose Federal Judicial Police radio code was "Z1", a code given to high-ranking officers.

=== Foundation ===
After Osiel Cárdenas Guillén took control of the Gulf Cartel in 1997, he found himself in a violent turf war. Decena deserted in 1997 and began working for Cárdenas in 1999 to protect from rival drug cartels and the Mexican Army. Decena lured more than thirty deserters from the elite Grupo Aeromóvil de Fuerzas Especiales (GAFE) to become his personal bodyguards, and later, as his mercenary wing. Some of these former GAFE members reportedly received training in commando and urban warfare from the Israeli and U.S. Special Forces.

Once Guillén consolidated his power, he expanded the responsibilities of Los Zetas, which began to organize kidnappings, protection rackets, extortion, securing cocaine supply and trafficking routes known as plazas (zones) and executing its foes, often with extreme violence. However, in November 2002, Decena was killed in a military action at a restaurant in Matamoros, Tamaulipas, allowing Heriberto Lazcano ("Z3") to take control of the group. In response to the rising power of the Gulf Cartel, the rival Sinaloa Cartel established Los Negros, an enforcer group similar to Los Zetas but not as complex or successful. Upon the arrest of Guillén in March 2003 and his extradition in 2007, the Zetas took a more active leadership role within the Gulf Cartel and their influence grew within the organization.

The Zetas' membership ranged from corrupt federal, state, and local police officers, and former U.S. Army personnel, to ex-Kaibiles, the special forces of the Guatemalan military. Over time, many of the Zetas' original thirty-one members were killed or arrested; a number of younger men filled the vacuum, but that left the group far from the efficiency of their paramilitary origins.

Los Zetas was partially responsible for a qualitative increase in the brutality of the violence seen during the modern Mexican drug wars. Unlike other cartels, the Zetas did not buy alliances so much as terrorize their enemies. Because the cartel was quite new at the time, it competed with more established cartels by using extreme violence and cruelty as a form of psychological warfare. They tortured victims, strung up bodies, and slaughtered indiscriminately. They preferred to take military-style control of territory, holding it through sheer force and exploiting its criminal opportunities. Although their military training was diluted over time, their brutality was not. Rival cartels struggling against the Zetas began to adopt some of their tactics, further ramping up violence in the country. As other organized crime groups subsequently copied the Zetas' brutal and extreme methods to ensure their survival, this escalated the violence in Mexico to new heights. Some of these new torture methods and hyper-violent executions included practices such as flaying and castration.

=== Split from the Gulf Cartel ===
Los Zetas gunmen interrogating a member of the Gulf Cartel

Following the capture and extradition of Cárdenas, Los Zetas became so powerful that they outnumbered and outclassed the Gulf Cartel in revenue, membership, and influence by 2010. As a result of this imbalance, the Cartel tried to curtail their own enforcers' influence and ended up instigating a civil war. In addition, the Gulf Cartel, through its narco-banners in Matamoros and Reynosa, accused Los Zetas of expanding their operations to murder, theft, extortion, kidnapping – actions that the Gulf Cartel allegedly disagreed with. Los Zetas countered by posting their own banners throughout Tamaulipas, noting that they had carried out executions and kidnappings under orders of the Gulf Cartel and they were originally created for that sole purpose. In addition, Los Zetas charged that the Gulf Cartel was scapegoating them for the murders of innocent civilians.

Reports vary as to who triggered the formal split and why. Some sources claim that Guillén, brother of Cárdenas and one of the successors of the Gulf Cartel, was addicted to gambling, sex, and drugs, leading Los Zetas to perceive his leadership as a threat to the organization. Other reports mention, however, that the divide occurred due to a disagreement on who would take on the leadership of the cartel after the extradition of Cárdenas. The candidates from the Cartel were Guillén and Jorge Eduardo Costilla Sánchez, while Los Zetas wanted to hand the leadership to their own head, Lazcano. The Cartel also reportedly began looking to form a truce with the rival Sinaloa Cartel, which Los Zetas did not want to recognize, allegedly preferring an alliance with the Beltrán-Leyva Cartel.

Samuel Flores Borrego, a lieutenant of the Cartel, killed Zetas lieutenant Sergio Peña Mendoza alias "Comandante Concord", due to a disagreement over the drug corridor of Reynosa, whom both protected. Los Zetas demanded that the Cartel hand over the killer, but they refused.This refusal marked the beginning of the split between the two organizations: within months, Los Zetas moved to seize territory and drug routes previously controlled by their former Gulf Cartel allies, igniting the broader Los Zetas–Gulf Cartel conflict that dominated organized crime in northeastern Mexico through 2010 and beyond.

When the hostilities began, the Cartel joined forces with its former rivals, the Sinaloa Cartel and La Familia Michoacana, aiming to take out Los Zetas. Consequently, Los Zetas allied with the Beltrán-Leyva Cartel, the Juárez Cartel, and the Tijuana Cartel.

=== Los Zetas infighting ===
In early 2010, Miguel Treviño Morales, the former second-in-command of Los Zetas, had reportedly taken the leadership of the Zetas and displaced Lazcano. Lazcano was initially content to have Morales in his ranks, but reportedly gave Morales too much power and underestimated his violent nature. Morales' active leadership gained him the loyalty and respect of many in Los Zetas, leading many to eventually stop paying their tributes to Lazcano. Los Zetas were inherently an unstable organized crime group with a long history of brutal violence. Another splinter group was formed also named Sangre Nueva Zeta (New Blood Zeta), allying themselves with the Jalisco Cartel as an armed wing. In March 2019, Texas Republican congressman Chip Roy introduced a bill that would list the Cartel Del Noreste faction of Los Zetas, Jalisco New Generation Cartel and Gulf Cartel as foreign terrorist organizations. Those plans were halted at the request of Mexican president Andrés Manuel López Obrador, but in February 2025, State Department designated the Cártel del Noreste, one of the main splinter groups remaining from the Zetas, as a foreign terrorist organization.

=== Attacks ===
Los Zetas have also carried out multiple massacres and attacks on civilians and rival cartels, such as:

- the 2010 San Fernando massacre (24 August), where 72 migrants were found dead;
- the 2011 San Fernando massacre (6 April – 7 June), where 193 people were killed;
- the massacre of 27 farmers in Guatemala (discovered on 15 May 2011);
- the 2011 Monterrey casino attack (25 August), where 52 people were killed;
- the Altamira prison brawl (4 January 2012), where 31 Gulf cartel inmates were killed;
- the Apodaca prison riot (19 February 2012), where 44 Gulf cartel inmates were killed and 37 Zetas escaped from prison;

In addition, sources reveal that Los Zetas may also be responsible for:

- the 2010 Puebla oil pipeline explosion, which killed 28 people, injured 52, and damaged over 115 homes.
- the 2011 massacre at Allende, Coahuila where an estimated 300–500 civilians were killed after the Zetas accused two local men of betraying the organization.
- The BPM Festival shootings (16 January 2017), which killed five people (two Mexicans, one American, one Canadian, and one Italian) and injured 15 at the Blue Parrot nightclub in Playa del Carmen. A large hand-painted sign was hung in the town which contained specific references to BPM and its co-founder and was signed by "El Fayo Z".

=== Current status ===
By 2011, only 10 of the original 34 Zetas remained fugitives, and to this day most of them have either been killed or captured by the Mexican law enforcement and military forces.

As of 2012, Los Zetas had control over 11 states in Mexico, making it the drug cartel with the largest territory in the country. Their rivals, the Sinaloa Cartel, had lost some territories to Los Zetas, and went down from 23 states in dominion to 16.

By the beginning of 2012, Mexico's government escalated its offensive against the Zetas with the announcement that five new military bases will be installed in the group's primary areas of operation.

On 9 October 2012, the Mexican Navy confirmed that Los Zetas leader Heriberto Lazcano had been killed in a firefight with Mexican marines in Coahuila.

In a May 2013 interview with the International Crisis Group, researcher Daniel Haering stated, "The old networks were disrupted by the Zetas, and now the Zetas have disintegrated into Zetillas. They are splinter groups ('grupúsculos'), not big operators."

On 14 July 2013, it was reported that the Mexican Marine Corps captured the Zetas leader Miguel Ángel Treviño Morales, also known as "Z-40" in Anáhuac, Nuevo León, near the border of Tamaulipas state. The authorities allege that he was succeeded by Omar Treviño Morales (alias Z-42), his brother.

On 12 October 2013, Mexican authorities captured alleged top Zetas operative Gerardo Jaramillo, alias "El Yanqui". His arrest ultimately resulted in the discovery and seizure of a large Zetas weapons cache and supply stash, including "assault rifles, several grenade launchers, magazines, 2,000 rounds of ammunition of various calibres, bullet-proof vests and balaclavas".

On 9 May 2014, one of the founding members, Galindo Mellado Cruz, and four other armed men were killed in a shootout after Mexican security forces raided Cruz's hideout in the city of Reynosa.

On 3 March 2015, Mexican security forces arrested the last known leader of the remaining Zetas structure, Omar Treviño Morales (alias "Z-42") in a suburb in Monterrey, Nuevo León.

On 23 March 2015, Ramiro Pérez Moreno (alias "El Rana"), a potential successor of "Z-42" was captured, along with 4 other men, carrying 6 kilos of cocaine and marijuana, rifles and one hand grenade.

On 9 February 2018, Mexican authorities arrested the new leader José María Guízar Valencia alias "Z-43" in Mexico City in Roma neighbourhood. U.S. offered $5m reward for his capture, he is responsible for importing thousands of kilograms of cocaine and methamphetamine to the U.S. every year and murdered an untold number of Guatemalan civilians during the systematic takeover of the Guatemalan border region.

On 9 April 2019, José Roberto Stolberg Becerra, also known as "La Barbie", was arrested in Jalisco. He was reported to have been the leader of the cartel's Los Zetas la Vieja Escuela (Old School Zetas) faction.

On 26 May 2019, an operative for Los Zetas in the Veracruz municipalities of Las Choapas and Agua Dulce was arrested by the Mexican Navy.

In early July 2019, Los Zetas leaders Jorge Antonio "El Yorch" Gloria Palacios, the second-in-command of the Cartel Del Noreste (CDN) faction of Los Zetas, and Hugo "El Ganso" Sanchez Garcia, who served as head of Los Zetas in San Fernando, were detained by Mexican authorities.

In January 2020, Los Zetas regional leader José Carmen N., also known as "El Comandante Reyes", was arrested in Oaxaca. He was believed to be in charge of the gang's operations in 12 municipalities in Veracruz, including Acayucan, Minatitlán and Coatzacoalcos, known as the state's most violent towns. The same month, Verónica Hernández Giadáns, the Attorney General of Veracruz, admitted that her cousin Guadalupe "La Jefa" Hernández Hervis was in fact chief of operations for Los Zetas and also a close association of former Los Zetas leader Hernán "El Comandante H" Martínez Zavaleta, who was arrested in 2017.

In March 2020, senior Los Zetas operative Hugo Alejandro Salcido Cisneros, also known as "El Porras" or "Comandante Pinpon", was killed in a gun battle with police in Nuevo Laredo. Salcido Cisneros was the leader of the "Tropa del Infierno", a group of hitmen under the direction of the Cartel Del Noreste (CDN) faction of Los Zetas. Several other Tropa del Infierno gunmen were injured in the clashes as well.

In May 2020, Moisés Escamilla, a leader of the "Old School Zetas", died in prison due to COVID-19.

== Tamaulipas state corruption ==
=== Political corruption ===
Tamaulipas has experienced significant drug-related violence and political corruption, particularly in connection with the activities of the Gulf Cartel and Los Zetas.

The drug violence and political corruption that has plagued Tamaulipas, the home state of the Gulf Cartel and Los Zetas, has fueled fears of it becoming a "failed state" and a haven for drug traffickers and criminals. The massacre of 72 migrants and the discovery of mass graves in San Fernando, the assassination of the gubernatorial candidate Rodolfo Torre Cantú, the increasing violence between cartels, and the state's inability to ensure safety have led some analysts to conclude in 2011 that "neither the regional nor federal government have control over the territory of Tamaulipas."

Although drug-related violence had existed long before the Mexican drug war, it often happened in low-profile levels, with the government "looking the other way" in exchange for bribes while drug traffickers went about their business – as long as there was no violence. During the 71-year rule of the Institutional Revolutionary Party (PRI), the Mexican government would conduct customary arrests and allow cartel business to continue.

After the PRI lost power to the National Action Party (PAN) in the 2000 presidential election, all the "agreements" between the previous government and the cartels were lost along with the pax mafiosa. Tamaulipas was no exception; according to PAN politician Santiago Creel, the PRI in Tamaulipas had been protecting the Gulf-Zeta organization for years. The PAN has claimed that government elections in Tamaulipas are likely to encounter an "organized crime influence".

In addition, there are formal charges that three former governors of Tamaulipas – Manuel Cavazos Lerma (1993–1999), Tomás Yarrington (1999–2005), and Eugenio Hernández Flores (2005–2010) – have had close ties with the Gulf-Zeta organization. On 30 January 2012, the Attorney General of Mexico issued a communiqué ordering the governors and their families to remain in the country as they are being investigated for possible collaboration with cartels. In 2012, Yarrington was further accused of money laundering for Los Zetas and the Gulf Cartel.

In Tampico, Mayor Óscar Pérez Inguanzo was arrested on 12 November 2011 due to his "improper exercise of public functions and forgery" of certain documents. In mid-2010, both Flores and the mayor of Reynosa, Óscar Luebbert Gutiérrez – both members of the PRI – were criticized for claiming that there were no armed confrontations in Tamaulipas and that the widespread violence was "only a rumor". Months later, Flores finally acknowledged that several parts of Tamaulipas were "being overrun by organized crime violence". Gutiérrez later recognized the work of the federal troops and acknowledged that his city was experiencing "an escalation in violence".

=== Prison breaks ===
On 25 March 2010, forty inmates escaped from a federal prison in the city of Matamoros. On 5 April 2010, at a prison in Reynosa, a convoy of ten trucks packed with gunmen entered the prison grounds without resistance, broke into the cells, and liberated thirteen "extremely dangerous" inmates. Eighty-five inmates escaped from the same Reynosa prison six months later. In Nuevo Laredo, on 17 December 2010, 141 inmates escaped from a federal prison. The federal government condemned the mass prison break and stated that the work by the state and municipal authorities of Tamaulipas lack effective control measures, and urged them to strengthen their institutions.

A confrontation inside a maximum security prison in Nuevo Laredo on 15 July 2011 left 7 inmates dead and 59 escaped. Five on-duty guards have not been found. The governor of Tamaulipas then acknowledged his inability to secure federal prisoners and prisons. Consequently, the federal government assigned the Mexican Army and the Federal Police to guard some prisons until further notice; they were also left in charge of searching for the fugitives. It has been reported that more than 400 prison inmates escaped from several Tamaulipas prisons from January 2010 to March 2011 due to corruption.

On 17 September 2012 in Piedras Negras, Coahuila, more than 130 inmates from Los Zetas organized a massive prison break in broad daylight by walking directly from the front gate to several trucks outside the prison.

=== Police corruption ===
Tamaulipas police forces are the worst paid in Mexico despite being one of the states hardest hit by drug violence. In Aguascalientes, a state where violence levels are much lower, police are paid five times more than in Tamaulipas. As a result, most police forces in Tamaulipas are believed to be susceptible to corruption in the form of bribes from organized crime groups. The National Public Security System (SNSP) has condemned the low police salaries and demanded that state and municipal authorities create better payment programs for police. On 7 November 2011, 650 policemen were released from their duties because they had either failed or refused "corruption control tests".

Although the Joint Operation Nuevo León-Tamaulipas issued in 2007, along with several other military-led operations by the federal government, brought thousands of troops to restore order in Tamaulipas, on 9 May 2011, the Federal Police and the Mexican Army disarmed all police forces in Tamaulipas, beginning with the cities of Matamoros and Reynosa. The following month, the federal government was asked to send in troops to combat the drug cartels in the area, to "consolidate actions on public safety" and "strengthen the capacity of their institutions". However, the troops could only replace half of the policemen in the state. Consequently, the government began building military bases in Ciudad Mier, San Fernando and Ciudad Mante.

== Organizational structure and training ==
Los Zetas have set up camps to train recruits as well as corrupt ex-federal, state, and local police officers. In September 2005 testimony to the Mexican Congress from the then-Defense Secretary Clemente Vega, indicated that the Zetas had also hired at least 30 former Kaibiles from Guatemala to train new recruits because the number of former Mexican special forces men in their ranks had shrunk. Los Zetas' training locations have been identified as having a similar setup as military GAFE training facilities.

Los Zetas members may also possess a "Los Zetas Commando Medallion" for their service to the organization.

It is reported that Los Zetas also uses women within their organizational structure. There is a female unit known as the Panteras, or panthers. These women use seduction to negotiate with military, law enforcement, and political personnel to help Los Zetas' goals. In the event that they are unable to obtain the desired outcome, they may kill their targets. The initial leader of this group was Ashly "La Comandante Bombón" Narro López; she was captured in 2009 in connection to the murder of General Tello Quiñones. Women also work within the cartel as plaza bosses, administrators, mediators, and shooters.

=== List of initial members ===
Arturo Guzman was initially tasked by Cardenas to recruit 20 men to murder his rival Rolando Lopez Salinas. Guzman and Lazcano were eventually able to convince 34 GAFE operators to leave the Mexican Army and form the core of Los Zetas. The first 14 members became known as the "Group of 14" (Grupo de los Catorce) or simply "The 14" (Los 14).

- Z-1 – Arturo Guzmán Decena – Mexican Army Special Forces GAFE
- Z-2 – Alejandro Lucio Morales Betancourt – Mexican Army Aviation, Military Intelligence, GAFE
  - Replaced by Rogelio González Pizaña – Federal Judicial Police helicopter pilot
- Z-3 – Heriberto Lazcano Lazcano – Mexican Army Special Forces GAFE
- Z-4 – Hugo Ponce Salazar – Mexican Army Special Forces GAFE
- Z-5 – Luis Alberto Guerrero Reyes – Mexican Army 70th Infantry Battalion, GAFE
  - Replaced by Braulio Arellano Domínguez – Mexican Army Infantry Forces
- Z-6 – Mateo Díaz López – Mexican Army Armored Forces GAFE
- Z-7 – Jesús Enrique Rejón Aguilar – Mexican Army Special Forces Ordinance Officer GAFE
- Z-8 – Óscar Guerrero Silva – Mexican Army Special Forces Logistics Officer GAFE
- Z-9 – Raúl Alberto Trejo Benavides – Mexican Army Special Forces GAFE
  - Replaced by Galindo Mellado Cruz
- Z-10 – Ernesto Zatarín Beliz – Mexican Army Special Forces Communications Officer GAFE
  - Replaced by Omar Lorméndez Pitalúa – Mexican Army Special Forces GAFE
- Z-11 – Galindo Mellado Cruz – Mexican Army Special Forces GAFE
- Z-12 – Luis Reyes Enríquez – Mexican Army Special Forces GAFE
- Z-13 – Hector Daniel Reyes Reyes – Mexican Army Special Forces GAFE
- Z-14 – Efraín Teodoro Torres – Mexican Army Non-Commissioned Officer Infantry Forces
- Z-15 – Gustavo González Castro – Mexican Air Force Infantry Forces
- Z-16 – Raúl Lucio Hernández Lechuga – Mexican Army Special Forces GAFE
- Z-17 – Carlos Vera Calva – Mexican Army Special Forces GAFE
  - Replaced by Juan Miguel Vizcarra Cruz – Mexican Army Special Forces GAFE
- Z-18 – Gonzalo Gerezano Escribano – Mexican Army Special Forces GAFE
- Z-19 – Maxiley Barahona Nadales – Mexican Army Special Forces GAFE
- Z-20 – Nabor Vargas García – Mexican Army Presidential Guard
- Z-22 – Jorge Lucas Hernández Barras – Mexican Army Special Forces GAFE
- Z-23 – Flavio Méndez Santiago – Mexican Army Special Forces GAFE
- Z-24 – Javier Almazán Baldera – Mexican Army Special Forces GAFE
- Z-25 – Germán Torres Jiménez – Mexican Army Infantry Forces
- Z-27 – Juan Pedro Saldivar-Farías – Mexican Army Special Forces GAFE
- Z-36 – Juan Carlos de la Cruz Reyna – Tamaulipas State Police (Not a founding member but a high-ranking member within the organization)
- Z-37 – Ciro González Pérez – Mexican Army Special Forces GAFE
- Z-44 – Sergio Enrique Ruiz-Tlapanco – Mexican Army Federal Judicial Police
- El Parra – Miguel Angel Soto Parra – Mexican Army Federal Judicial Police
- Comandante Guerra/X-18–Rogelio Guerra Ramírez – Mexican Army
- El Calentano – not confirmed – Hitman, and territory commander (possibly belonging to special unit). Mainly in charge of the territories in the states of Michoacán and Guerrero.

=== Territory ===
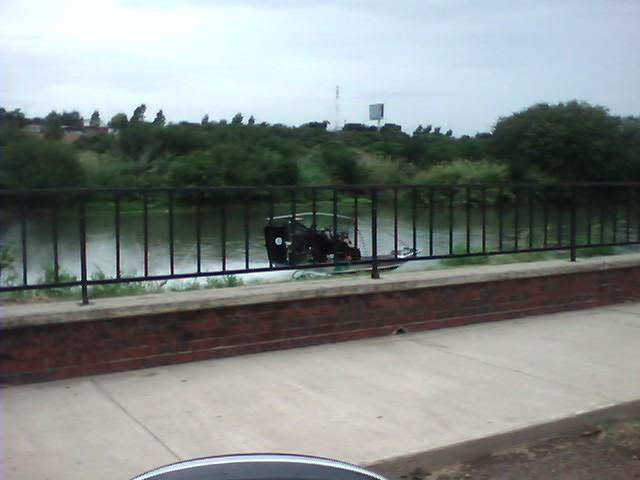
United States Border Patrol patrolling the Rio Grande in an airboat in Laredo, Texas

In the early 2010s, analysts indicated that Los Zetas were the largest organized crime group in Mexico in terms of geographical presence. They were primarily based in the border region of Nuevo Laredo and Coahuila with hundreds more throughout the country. They placed lookouts at arrival destinations such as airports, bus stations and main roads. In addition to conducting criminal activities along the border, they operated throughout the Gulf of Mexico, in the southern states of Tabasco, Yucatán, Quintana Roo, and Chiapas, and in the Pacific Coast states of Guerrero, Oaxaca, and Michoacán, as well as in Mexico City.

They were also active in several states in the United States, including Texas. The cartel also had important areas of operation in Guatemala, where their operations are reported to have begun as early as 2008. They were active in Europe, specifically in Italy with the 'Ndrangheta. Early in 2012 it was reported that Los Zetas were operating in the northern Venezuela–Colombia border, and had teamed up with the Colombian outfit called Los Rastrojos. Together they controlled the drug trafficking routes in the Colombian La Guajira and the Venezuelan state of Zulia, Colombia as the producing country and Venezuela as the main port route toward the U.S. and Europe.

=== Rivalries ===
Indications of the broken alliance between the Gulf Cartel and Los Zetas began in September 2009. On 24 February 2010, gunmen onboard hundreds of trucks marked C.D.G, XXX, and M3 – the insignias of the Cartel – clashed with Zetas gunmen in the northern cities of Tamaulipas. The clash between these two groups started in Reynosa, and then expanded to Nuevo Laredo and Matamoros. The war then spread out through eleven municipalities of Tamaulipas, nine of them bordering Texas. Soon, the war reached Tamaulipas' neighboring states of Nuevo León and Veracruz. Their conflict also spread to U.S. soil, where rival cartel hitmen killed two Zeta members in Brownsville, Texas, on 5 October 2010.

Confrontations between the two groups temporarily paralyzed entire cities in broad daylight. Many of the municipalities throughout Tamaulipas were described by witnesses as "war zones", with many businesses and homes burned down. In the midst of violence and panic, local authorities and media tried to minimize the situation and claimed that "nothing was occurring", but the facts were impossible to cover up.

For many years, there were long-fought battles between the Gulf and Sinaloa Cartels, that eventually led the two to reevaluate the situation and decide whether or not this combat was in either organization's best interests. The complexity and territorial advantage of Los Zetas forced the Gulf Cartel to seek an alliance with the Sinaloa Cartel and La Familia Michoacana.

=== Alliances ===
Following the conflict with the Gulf Cartel, Los Zetas joined forces with the Beltrán Leyva Cartel (who was simultaneously separating from the Sinaloa Cartel) as well as the Juarez Cartel and Tijuana Cartel or Arellano Félix organization, to counteract the alliance of the Gulf Cartel, Sinaloa Cartel and La Familia Michoacana cartels. Since February 2010, the major cartels have aligned in two factions, one formed by the Juárez Cartel, Tijuana Cartel, Los Zetas and the Beltrán-Leyva Cartel; the other faction integrated by the Gulf Cartel, Sinaloa Cartel and La Familia Cartel.

==== United States ====
In a 2010 report, it was noted Sureño street gangs maintain ties with the Los Zetas cartel in California and South Carolina. A recent report from the FBI shows U.S. street gangs growing closer with Mexican cartels. Within the United States, Los Zetas are using social media as a method of communication between the two countries and are also using the sites as a method of recruiting young aspiring members who in their perception see the actions of the cartel as glorified and are able to ask how they can join. In addition, Sureños share connections with Los Zetas, as do the gangs MS-13, Mexican Mafia, and Latin Kings. Los Zetas used main highways in the United States such as I-10, I-40, and I-35 to get their drugs to different cities. A few of these cities include Chicago and Houston.

==== Venezuela ====
On 13 February 2017, Venezuelan vice president Tareck El Aissami was sanctioned by the United States Treasury Department under the Foreign Narcotics Kingpin Designation Act, with U.S. officials accusing him of facilitating drug shipments from Venezuela to Mexico and the U.S., freezing millions of dollars of assets purportedly under El Aissami's control. The accusation included allegations that El Aissami had trafficked drugs to Los Zetas.

== Law enforcement raids ==
Due to the high level counter insurgency training of the initial members from the Mexican military, Los Zetas have been infamously difficult to disrupt. Despite this, Los Zetas operations have been successfully interrupted by U.S. and Mexican Law enforcement agencies. Following a bilateral law enforcement investigation named 'Operation Black Jack', executed by the ATF, DEA, ICE and the FBI, three Zeta safe houses were identified in Mexico and raided by Mexican federal security forces, releasing more than 40 kidnapped individuals, and making the largest weapons seizure in the history of Mexico; it included 540 rifles including 288 assault rifles and several .50-caliber rifles, 287 hand grenades, 2 M72 LAW anti-tank weapons, 500,000 rounds of ammunition, 67 ballistic vests, 3 anti aircraft weapons and 14 sticks of dynamite.

In October 2008, the FBI warned that a Zetas' cell in Texas would engage law enforcement with a full tactical response, should law enforcement attempt to intervene in their operations. The cell leader was identified as Jaime González Durán (The Hummer), who was later arrested on 7 November 2008, in the border city of Reynosa, Tamaulipas.

In February 2009, Texas Governor Rick Perry announced a program called "Operation Border Star Contingency Plan" to safeguard the border if the Zetas carried out their threats to attack U.S. security officers. This project included the use of tanks, airplanes and the National Guard "as a preventive measure upon the possible collapse of the Mexican State" to protect the border from a Zetas attack and receive an eventual exodus of Mexicans fleeing from the violence.

In 2012, the Obama administration imposed sanctions on Los Zetas as one of four key transnational organized crime groups, along with the Brothers' Circle from Russia, the Yamaguchi-gumi (yakuza) from Japan, and the Camorra from Italy.

Also in 2012, the United States posted a $5,000,000 reward for information leading to the successful capture of Miguel Treviño Morales. Trevino-Morales is known in Los Zetas as "Z-40". On 12 June 2012, "Z-40" and two of his brothers were arrested and indicted on charges in Texas after raids and dozens of arrests in New Mexico, Texas and Oklahoma.

The United States does not send Mexico high amounts of funding to combat Los Zetas. The Mérida Initiative that was put in place by the Bush administration in the United States suggested that $1.4 billion in funds was to be sent to Mexico over a three-year period to combat narco trafficking from the U.S.–Mexico border to Panama, but few of these funds have yet to be received in Mexico. In addition, the Obama administration addressed supporting the struggling country although "former drug czar Barry McCaffrey told Congress that Merida, was 'a drop in the bucket'", and that the United States "cannot afford to have a narco-state as [their] neighbour". Thus far, of the resources promised by the United States government regarding Mexico and their ongoing drug combat, little has been received, principally because Mexico's 2012–2018 PRI government failed to honor the clause of improving and upholding human rights in the Mexican Federal Republic.

== Anonymous' Operation Cartel ==
The operation to expose information of people who work with Los Zetas, dubbed "Operation Cartel", was reportedly started as a result of an Anonymous member being kidnapped during Operation Paperstorm in Veracruz, a once-peaceful city.

The New York Times mentioned that Los Zetas has access to sophisticated tracking software due to the fact that they have infiltrated Mexican law enforcement agencies, and that online anonymity might not be enough protection for Internet users. The conflict ended with the release of the hostage, and threats of massacres if Anonymous were to leak any more information.

== Influence outside of Mexico ==
Los Zetas have caused terror throughout Mexico for the past two decades. But they also present a threat to all nations in the Western Hemisphere. As of 2017, 40% of Mexico's oil market is under the control of the Zetas. According to the U.S. Energy Information Administration, Mexico is responsible for 10% of all of United States petroleum imports and plays an even larger role in exporting to nations in South America. In the oil industry alone, the influence of Los Zetas has the potential to cause economic instability in every nation Mexico partners with, and many of these nations may not have the economy to be able to withstand this instability.

The Zetas also play a role in transporting humans and drugs across borders, providing security to these operations. These drug trades are responsible for providing countries from Colombia to the United States with narcotics and other harmful substances. Mexico serves as a central location for these organizations to conduct their business and thus gets affected the most, but the effects are seen all along the trade route. In addition to the more common drugs like marijuana and cocaine, the DEA has reported Los Zetas have also provided support in the fentanyl trade. These harder drugs are shipped to the cartels through partnerships with China and other Asian countries, before being distributed out across the Americas. The constant supply of drugs to all countries in the west can be directly contributed to the Zetas and other major cartels in Mexico, and it will continue to corrupt Mexico's neighbors.

The last method Los Zetas use to influence western nations is through criminal rule in prison systems. Los Zetas members have long been known to create a system of criminal governance within prison systems through extortion and executions, and they have been the catalyst for many prison riots and outbreaks in nations outside of Mexico. Los Angeles, in particular, has seen a significant increase in Los Zetas' presence within their prison systems, and Guatemala also has a large population of convicted ex-military members with ties to the cartel in their prison systems. While these two nations have the most influence from the cartel, Los Zetas are beginning to occupy more nations in the west and recruit members through prison systems.

== In popular culture ==
- In the 2011 short Keep Your Enemies Closer, the head of Los Zetas is a dangerous drug lord named Jimmy "The King" Agilar (played by Manny Pérez).
- In the 2010 film Predators, one of the main characters, Cuchillo (played by Danny Trejo) is a ruthless and infamous enforcer for the Los Zetas.
- Los Zetas are the main focus of the Gangland season 3 episode To Torture or to Kill (3x11). In this episode, in addition to showing the brutal crimes committed by Los Zetas, the episode is focused on a notorious member of the cartel: Rosalio "Bart" Reta (a notorious sicario from Los Zetas known for becoming a Los Zetas sicario in his teens).
- The Netflix/Univision television series El Chapo depicts "Los Emes" as a semi-fictionalized version of Los Zetas that maintains an alliance with the Gulf Cartel and eventually wages a bloody gun battle with the Sinaloa Cartel for control of Nuevo Laredo.
- The Sky Atlantic/Canal+/Amazon Prime Video television series ZeroZeroZero depicts a team of Mexican special forces soldiers who become brutal enforcers for a drug cartel. The Roberto Saviano non-fiction book of the same name, upon which the show was based, partially focuses on Los Zetas.

== See also ==
- Illegal drug trade
- Mérida Initiative
- Narco tank, improvised fighting vehicles used by Los Zetas
- War on drugs
- List of gangs in Mexico
- List of Mexico's 37 most-wanted drug lords
