= Infighting in Los Zetas =

- Part of Mexican drug war
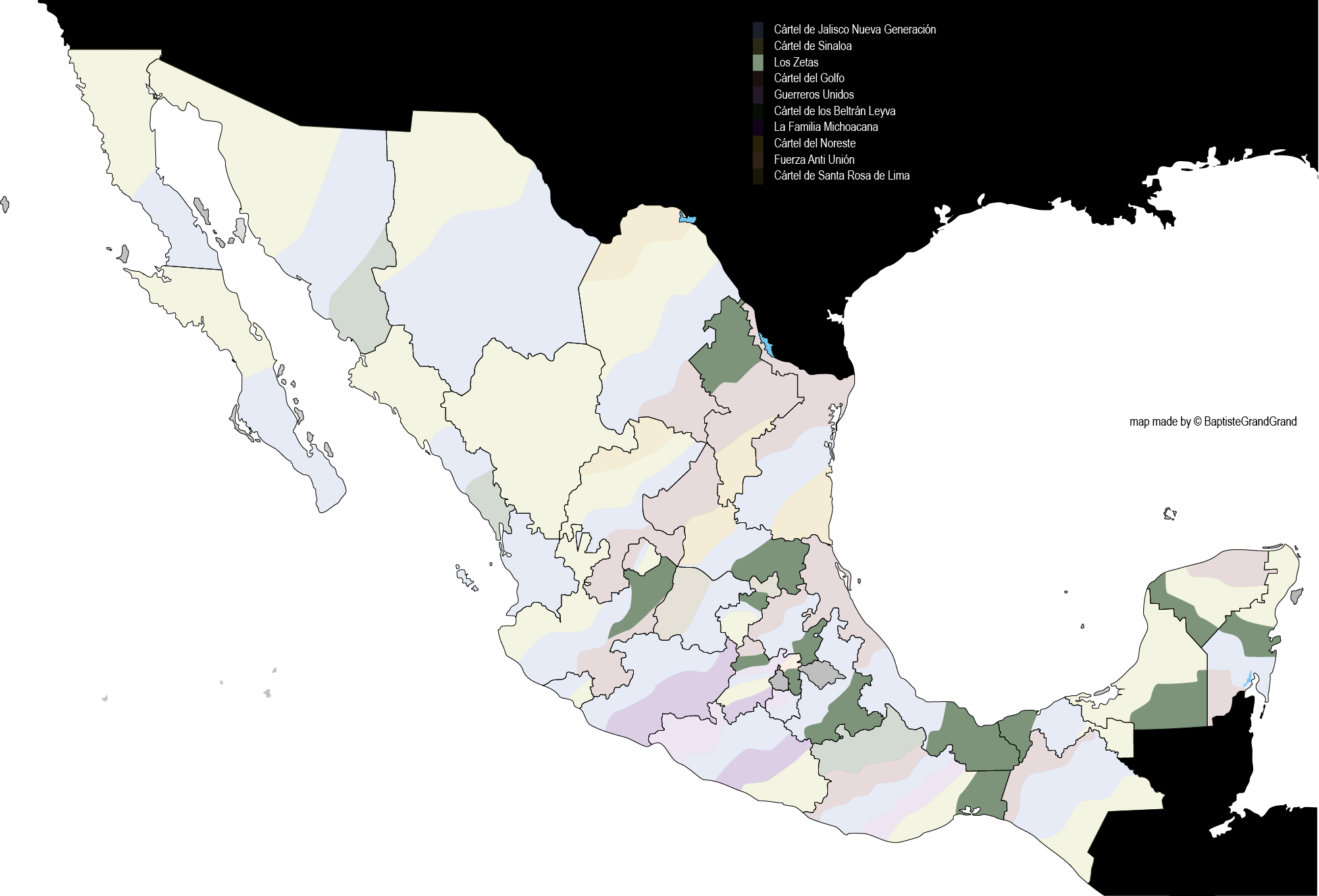
- All Los Zetas territories ( in green ), in total 14 territories
Date	1 June 2012 – present
Location	Coahuila, Nuevo Leon, Tamaulipas, San Luis Potosí, Veracruz, Mexico
Status	Ongoing; Functional disbandment of Los Zetas; Founding of the Northeast Cartel; Founding of Zetas Vieja Escuela; Founding of Los Talibanes

Belligerents
“El Lazca” faction (until 2012); Northeast Cartel (since 2014)	“Z-40” faction (until 2013); Zetas Vieja Escuela (since 2014)	“El Talibán” faction (until 2012); Los Talibanes (since 2012); Supported by: Sinaloa Cartel Jalisco New Generation Cartel

Commanders and leaders
Heriberto Lazcano Lazcano (“El Lazca”) †; Juan Gerardo Treviño Morales (POW); Agustin Ordorica Lopez	Miguel Treviño Morales (“Z-40”) (POW)	Iván Velázquez Caballero (“El Talibán”) (POW); Jorge Iván Hernández Cantù (POW); Juan Pedro Salvador Saldivar Farias (POW)

Casualties and losses
- 454 deaths

The infighting in Los Zetas is an ongoing armed internal conflict between factions of the former Los Zetas cartel, spread across various territories in Mexico.

Fractionalization within Los Zetas had caused several major conflicts between cells in the early 2010s, exasperated by the organization’s decentralized leadership structure. By 2010, local leaders of Los Zetas cells would being to disobey orders from the head leadership, and would go on to commit intimidation acts of mass murder such as the 2010 and 2011 San Fernando massacres, 2011 Monterrey Casino attack, and 2012 Cadereyta Jimenez massacre.

Rumors of a split within the cartel appeared in mid-2012, when public banners and music videos on the web alleged betrayals between the two leaders of the organization, Heriberto Lazcano Lazcano (“El Lazca”) and Miguel Treviño Morales (“Z-40”). However, after Lazcano’s death in October of 2012, it was confirmed that the leaders were no longer fighting each other; rather, some men within Morales' faction of Los Zetas, led by Iván Velázquez Caballero (“El Talibán”), did not want him as leader and began a revolt against him.

Following Treviño Morales’ arrest in July of 2013, Los Zetas effectively ceased to exist as a cohesive group, and its infighting has devolved into conflicts between its succeeding organizations, mainly Zetas Vieja Escuela, the Northeast Cartel, and Los Talibanes.

== Background ==
Los Zetas was founded some time in 1997 by various defecting soldiers of Mexico’s Special Forces Airmobile Group (GAFE), as a quasi-special forces and intimidation wing of the Gulf Cartel. The organization would eventually supersede its parent cartel in terms of membership and revenue, and it would split from the Gulf Cartel in 2010. When Los Zetas separated – an event involving Miguel Treviño Morales (“El Lazca”) – the cartel become one of the two most powerful drug trafficking organizations in Mexico, alongside the Sinaloa Cartel.

Unlike other traditional criminal organizations in Mexico, a large portion of Los Zetas’ income comes from local operations; drug trafficking only makes up around 50% of their revenue (other sources say less), with the rest coming from other acts such as kidnapping, extortion, theft and piracy. This decentralized structure opened the gang to internal splits, given the influence of low-level and regional leaders.

=== Problems between Treviño Morales and Lazcano Lazcano ===
Treviño Morales had begun to take over Los Zetas' assets and power from then-current leader Heriberto Lazcano Lazcano (“Z-40”) in early 2010. Initially, Lazcano was supportive of Treviño Morales’ role in the cartel, but underestimated his leadership aggressiveness and handed him a larger amount of power in the cartel. Splits would occur between the two leaders due to various differences in leadership styles and personal reasons; they lived in different parts of the country, had little in common outside of their cartel work, and Treviño Morales preferred violence while Lazcano was more business-like. Lazcano reportedly wanted Los Zetas to be less of a problem for the Peña Nieto government, while Treviño Morales was “someone who wants to fight the fight." While both leaders were willing to use violent methods to defend the cartel’s operations, Treviño Morales was described to personally enjoy sadistic methods, and was willing to go out of his way to engage in confrontations with rival groups. The leaders rarely met, only seeing each other about once a month, and they would eventually only communicate via mobile phone as tensions grew between them. Morales' present role and leadership in Los Zetas would also shift the loyalty and respect of many gang members to himself, and eventually many of these members stopped paying loyalty to Lazcano.

=== San Fernando massacres ===
72 immigrants were traveling from Central and South America when a convoy of Zetas abducted them in San Fernando, Tamaulipas on 24 August 2010. They were taken to a ranch, where one by one, the 72 immigrants were executed against a wall. One victim who survived by faking his death, traveled several miles until reaching a military checkpoint where he asked for help. The Mexican military arrived hours later and discovered the massacre.

In mid-2011, Mexican authorities reported several bus hijackings and mass abductions in San Fernando. According to the reports, members of Los Zetas had been hijacking buses near San Fernando and taking people by force, often in large numbers. Mexican authorities then discovered that the victims were buried in mass graves; after several excavations, 193 bodies were exhumed.

The Mexican government blamed Martín Omar Estrada Luna (a.k.a. El Kilo), the regional leader of Los Zetas in San Fernando, for the massacres. The man, who reportedly worked for Morales, was urged to keep a low body count in San Fernando in efforts to prevent the Mexican Armed Forces from disrupting their operations. Luna did not follow the warnings and was reportedly turned in to the authorities by other members. His failure to listen to his superiors illustrated that Los Zetas was a "fragmented group", where local leaders were making their own decisions without listening to their bosses.

=== Monterrey casino attack ===
On the afternoon of 25 August 2011, eight members of Los Zetas entered a casino in Monterrey, Nuevo León, and poured gasoline on the entrance, carpets and slot machines. In less than two minutes, the assailants fled the scene and the casino was consumed. 52 were killed; the victims, mostly women, were well-to-do civilians caught by the casino owner's refusal to pay for protection. The alleged mastermind was a low-level member who was seeking refuge far from Monterrey, suggesting that the chain of command in Los Zetas was fragmenting. It is still unclear to what degree Lazcano and Treviño Morales were involved in the "deadliest single attack of the Calderón presidency," but the attention the attack brought to Los Zetas was clearly unwelcome.

InSight Crime suggested that violence by Los Zetas was controlled at regional levels, suggesting that the top leaders had less control at a local level.

=== Cadereyta Jiménez massacre ===
On the outskirts of Cadereyta Jiménez, Nuevo León on 13 May 2012, authorities discovered 49 decapitated bodies dumped on a highway. Official reports alleged that a local cell of Los Zetas had tortured, mutilated, and decapitated their victims to send a message to their rivals. Morales, however, had ordered the regional boss of the Zeta cell and his henchmen to leave the bodies in the town's square and not outside the city limits; this defiance further supports the hypothesis that underbosses in Los Zetas were disobeying their superiors.

=== Money laundering in the U.S. ===
The interrogation of several arrested members of Los Zetas showed that the split was partly a result of disputes over the organization's assets. In June 2012, José Treviño Morales, the brother of Miguel, was arrested in a money laundering scheme that funded a racehorse operation in the United States. "The stables received more than $1 million US dollars from Mexico and had more than 300 stallions," said the FBI.

The news angered many in Los Zetas, who were jealous of how much money Morales was earning. The fact that Morales sought to expand his business in the U.S. and use some regions as refuge angered Lazcano. In November 2011, the Morales clan sidelined Lazcano's faction, which motivated other groups to fight back.

=== Expansionist agenda ===
Some experts, like former U.S. Drug Enforcement agent Mike Vigil, argue that the split in Los Zetas was an inevitable result given the cartel's rapid growth. A January 2012 report indicated that they were the most rapidly expanding criminal organization in Mexico, with presence in 16 of the 31 federal states.

Such infighting is typical in organized crime; when a group "expands its tentacles so much, an internal conflict is inevitable."

=== Government crackdown ===
Some government officials state that the infighting is a result of the success the Mexican security forces have had in stopping Los Zetas.

== Split and beginning on conflict ==
On the morning of 1 June 2012, a huge banner was put up by cartel members in downtown Zacatecas. Almost simultaneously, four teenagers climbed a pedestrian bridge at a busy avenue in Monterrey and placed the same banner with a large picture of Lazcano in the center. Around the image were small photographs of former Zetas members: Jesús Enrique Rejón Aguilar (El Mamito); Jaime González Durán (El Hummer); Arturo Guzmán Decena (Z-1); and Raúl Lucio Hernández Lechuga (El Lucky). In the following days, music videos appeared on YouTube with lyrics that read: "Pay attention, cartels in Mexico and in other countries. This is the story of a man who betrayed his fellow team members by allying with the federales to become the leader of Los Zetas." This warning starts the video called "The true story of Z-40."

Another video – "The new narcocorrido of Los Zetas" – portrayed Morales "as the New Judas" and accusing him of setting up the arrests and deaths of his own men. On 7 June 2012, a banner that matched the one in Monterrey appeared in Ciudad Mante, Tamaulipas on the door of a truck that was stuffed with 14 decapitated bodies. All of the banners that appeared in Zacatecas, Monterrey and Ciudad Mante began with the same warning: "This goes to all colleagues who work for Lazcano and Z-40." The new banners listed other accusations and betrayals in greater detail than the originals.

By August 2012, authorities officially confirmed that Los Zetas was experiencing an internal power struggle. Related publications claimed that Morales was looking to oust Lazcano, the last remaining former GAFE and founding member of Los Zetas. To avoid a betrayal which could lead to his arrest or death, Lazcano reportedly hid in Europe and elsewhere in Latin America, leaving Morales the stronger of the two. However, Morales' ascension did not assure him a clear victory. InSight Crime suggested that the evidence presented to support the claim of infighting is "hardly definitive". According to the agency, the only evidence was provided by one U.S. agent and the "narco-banners". The banners suggest that the cartel's problems come from the lower ranks of the organization and not from the top ranks. In addition, the agency noted that other banners claimed that Los Zetas was not split.

Regardless of the accuracy of the rumors, the rupture is predictable given the group's structure and its revenue sources. Unlike their Gulf Cartel progenitors, who earn much of their income from drug trafficking, Los Zetas' main revenues come from kidnapping, extortion, theft, piracy and other illegal activities. According to the book The Executioner's Men, by Samuel Logan and George W. Grayson, Los Zetas drug trafficking operations only account for 50% of its income, while InSight Crime estimates that it is much less.

And since a large portion of these revenues are attained at a local level, it is likely that the local Zeta cells are unhappy that the leaders are taking so much themselves. Mid-level commanders can break off into independent cells because they control their revenues. Los Zetas employs a franchise model. Low-level members use the brand name to create fear among their rivals and the public. Cartels that rely on drug trafficking for income require a secure supply via the center of the gang, but Los Zetas "franchises" can thrive by relying on non-drug activities. The model is scalable but is subject to internal ruptures.

=== San Luis Potosí massacre ===
The Mexican police found 14 dead bodies stuffed inside a SUV on 9 August 2012 along a highway in the city of San Luis Potosí. The massacre bore signs of organized crime, but it was not immediately clear which group was responsible. It was the sixth time that year that 14 bodies were dumped, suggesting that the number may have special significance among the cartels. The number "14" may possibly refer to Z-14, a deceased commander of Los Zetas named Efraín Teodoro Torres, or to the fourteen original founders.

Initial reports attributed the attack to the Gulf Cartel and other drug gangs united against Los Zetas; however, authorities concluded that the violence was a factional feud within Los Zetas. Reportedly, the fourteen bodies dumped were henchmen of Iván Velázquez Caballero (Z-50 or El Talibán), a leader, whose faction was based in the state of Coahuila. They had been killed by a hit squad working for Morales (Z-40). One of the victims survived the attack by faking his death while the assassins stashed his body with the rest of the victims. He fled the scene and notified the authorities; reportedly, he stated that the alliance between El Talibán and Z-40 was over. It was later confirmed that the massacre was triggered by Velázquez Caballero's desire to leave Los Zetas and form an alliance with the Gulf Cartel to attack Morales' faction.

Édgar Morales Pérez, the mayor-elect of a small town in San Luis Potosí, was killed during the fighting.

=== Nuevo Laredo massacre ===
Just after the arrest of the Gulf Cartel leader Jorge Eduardo Costilla Sánchez, 9 bodies were found dead in Nuevo Laredo, Tamaulipas on 15 September 2012, completing a death toll of 63 in the city in just eight days. An anonymous federal source said that a message was left at the scene of the massacre, but did not disclose its content. Reportedly, Iván Velázquez Caballero had tried to seize Morales' operatives and drug distribution sites in Nuevo Laredo.

== Potential outcomes ==
In a series of articles published in late August 2012, a U.S. law enforcement official told the press that Morales had taken the leadership of Los Zetas and overthrown Lazcano.

The disintegration of the Zetas gang may increase violence in Tamaulipas, Nuevo León and Veracruz. However, violence is not inevitable; the split may discourage them from making incursions into other states. If the bosses of Los Zetas relocate their gunmen from other states to northeastern Mexico, tension could lessen elsewhere. If many Zetas reunite with the Gulf Cartel (considering that "resisting collaboration" could mean an end to their drug industry), then northeastern Mexico could achieve peace. Guatemala moved to improve security in seven of its provinces in September 2012 fearing that the conflict could expand. Alternatively, some of their presence could be shifted to northeastern Mexico, leaving Guatemala's criminal underworld unpredictable.

A split in the Zetas could be encouraging for rival gangs. That in turn could have become a "major headache" for President Enrique Peña Nieto, who had vowed to reduce the violence that has killed more than 50,000 since 2006. If the Zetas break apart, drug violence in Mexico could increase, with over 10,000 cartel members fighting for control. Some security officials say that the split is proof of the success of the government crackdown, while others say that the infighting can prove to be problematic because "... it's like if the HIV virus mutates. Then you have to find two vaccines." Los Zetas are responsible for much of the violence in Mexico's drug war and they have expanded despite other cartels allying against them. A 2012 report indicated that the Zetas were present in 16 of the 31 states in Mexico, more than the wealthiest crime group, the Sinaloa Cartel.

== See also ==
- Mexican drug war
- Infighting in the Gulf Cartel
- 2011–2012 in the Mexican Drug War
