= ZVE =

ZVE can refer to:

- IATA code for Union Station (New Haven), train station in New Haven, Connecticut, U.S.
- Zetas Vieja Escuela, Mexican criminal organization
