= Los Talibanes =

Mexican criminal organization based in San Luis Potosí and Zacatecas

- Founded: 2012
- Founded by: Iván Velázquez Caballero
- Years active: 2012−present
- Territory: San Luis Potosí, Zacatecas (with a minor presence in the State of Mexico and Quintana Roo)
- Ethnicity: Mexican
- Allies: Gulf Cartel
- Rivals: Mexico; Jalisco New Generation Cartel; Los Zetas

Los Talibanes, known to a lesser extent as Los Nortes, are a Mexican criminal organization based in San Luis Potosí and Zacatecas. The name "Los Talibanes" is attributed to Iván Velázquez Caballero "El Talibán" or "El Z-50", who broke with Miguel Treviño Morales, "El Z-40", and allied himself with the Gulf Cartel to displace his former partner.

== History ==
The leader of this group, Iván Velázquez Caballero, began his criminal career by stealing cars in Nuevo Laredo. At age 22 he was imprisoned in the La Loma penitentiary for vehicle theft and eventually began working for Hector Sauceda Gamboa.

Upon release from prison, Velázquez Caballero became the cartel's regional boss in Nuevo Laredo and was eventually sent to the state of Zacatecas in 2007, where he reportedly had around 400 men at his beck and call. Velázquez Caballero was also a major financial operator and money launderer for Los Zetas. Unlike the original members of Los Zetas who joined the organization in the 1990s, Velázquez Caballero was not a former member of the Mexican Armed Forces. He started within the gangs of Nuevo Laredo before joining the Gulf Cartel as a member of Los L’s or the Lobos under Sauceda Gamboa aka El Karis before being integrated into Los Zetas. Velázquez Caballero is one of the few to ascend to the leadership of the group who is not a military deserter. As Velázquez Caballero ascended to Los Zetas, he changed his code name L-50 and his nickname to the El Talibán, a likely reference to the techniques of beheading carried out by Los Zetas and the Islamist group of the same name.

Since late 2011, Velázquez Caballero had announced his discontent with Treviño Morales through a series of public banners left in various parts of northeastern Mexico and by uploading several videos on YouTube, where he accused him of setting up the arrests or deaths of his own men. This group originated in the state of Tamaulipas, being sponsored by the Tamaulipas State Police, during the management of the previous Secretary of Security, Arturo Gutiérrez García. Since late 2011, Los Talibanes had a violent struggle against Los Zetas, with the abandonment of corpses with cards signed by Los Talibanes being common. Since the end of 2019, Los Talibanes have been fighting alongside the Jalisco New Generation Cartel and the Sinaloa Cartel to ensure control of the state of Zacatecas, this due to its geographical location, which makes it ideal for drug trafficking (specifically fentanyl) and migrants. Since then, Zacatecas has suffered a significant increase in violence.

Although the cartel's activities had been increasing since 2013, it was not until 6 March 2019 when they were publicly recognized as a threat. It happened at the morning conference of President Andrés Manuel López Obrador in San Luis Potosí. This group was commonly underestimated and considered just another cell or gang, this despite having a presence in entities as far away as the States of Mexico or Quintana Roo. Currently Raúl Velázquez Caballero, alias El Talibancito, is the one in charge of the cartel. According to figures from the Executive Secretariat of the National Public Security System in 2020, homicide rates in the state increased by 255% the number of intentional homicides, the majority of these being due to the struggle between cartels.

The organization InSight Crime reported in March 2021 that this group would be one of the main generators of violence in the state of Zacatecas, being allied with the Sinaloa Cartel, and facing the Jalisco New Generation Cartel in bloody clashes in municipalities such as Jerez or Valparaíso, leaving the homicide levels in that state among the highest in the country.
