= Narco tank =

Improvised fighting vehicle used by drug cartels

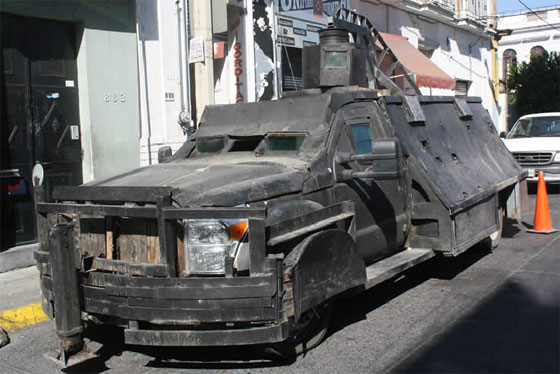
Ford F-350 "Monstruo 2010" featuring a turret, captured by Mexican authorities in Jalisco, 2011.

A narco tank, also called rhino trucks or monstruos (Spanish for 'monster'), is a type of improvised fighting vehicle used by drug cartels. The vehicles are primarily civilian trucks with improvised vehicle armour, which adds operational mobility, tactical offensive, and defensive capabilities when fighting law enforcement or rivals during drug trafficking activities.

== Mexico ==
In Mexico, narco tanks have been extensively manufactured and operated by drug cartels and other gangs involved in the Mexican drug war. They are often modified semi-trucks, dump trucks, pickup trucks, or other large vehicles not intended for such a purpose, and come equipped with varying levels of protection and attack capability. Mexican authorities have seized about twenty such armored trucks in the state of Tamaulipas alone, four of which were later destroyed. Cartels also began to build narco tanks with the armor installed on the interior rather than outside the vehicle, to draw away suspicion from rival drug cartels and the Mexican government. On May 22, 2011, one such vehicle belonging to the Sinaloa Cartel was seized in the state of Jalisco.

On May 25, that same year, one narco tank was destroyed in a clash between the Sinaloa cartel and the Los Zetas. In 2015, Mexican authorities found a narco tank factory in Nuevo Laredo, Tamaulipas that had eight vehicles in it, which were in the process of having armor plates with firing ports added to them. Some narco tanks are equipped with improvised battering rams on the front to break through roadblocks. Narco tanks were notably used in the Battle of Culiacán. Five narco tanks were destroyed in the Battle of Doctor Coss between 13 March and 14 March 2021.

== See also ==
- Illegal drug trade
- Los Zetas, drug cartel believed to be responsible for most narco-tanks
- Mexican drug war
- Narco sub
- Technical (vehicle)
- Killdozer (Bulldozer)
- Armored tornado research vehicle
  - SRV Dominator
  - Tornado Intercept Vehicle
