= Omar Treviño Morales =

Mexican drug lord (born 1974)

- Born: January 26, 1974 (age 52); Nuevo Laredo, Tamaulipas, Mexico
- Other names: L-42; Z-42; Omar; Óscar Treviño Morales; Comandante Forty Two; Alejandro Treviño Morales
- Occupation: Leader of Los Zetas
- Height: 5 ft 7 in (1.70 m)
- Predecessor: Miguel Treviño Morales
- Relatives: José Treviño Morales (brother)

Notes
- $5 million USD reward in U.S. Extradited to the United States

Óscar Omar Treviño Morales also known as Z-42, (born January 26, 1974) is a Mexican convicted drug lord and former leader of Los Zetas, a criminal organization. He was one of Mexico's most-wanted drug lords. His brother is Miguel Treviño Morales, a former leader of the group. The authorities believe he was the successor of his brother, who was arrested on July 15, 2013. On February 27, 2025, Morales and his brother were extradited to the United States.

== Criminal charges ==
Morales is allegedly responsible for several abductions and murders committed in Nuevo Laredo between 2005 and 2006 and the supply source for multi-kilogram loads of cocaine smuggled from Mexico to the United States. He was charged in a 2008 federal indictment in the U.S. District of Columbia, and the U.S. Department of State offered a reward of up to $5 million USD for information leading to his arrest and/or conviction. On 24 March 2010, the United States Department of the Treasury sanctioned him under the Foreign Narcotics Kingpin Designation Act (sometimes referred to simply as the "Kingpin Act"), for his involvement in drug trafficking along with fifty-three other international criminals and ten foreign entities. The act prohibited U.S. citizens and companies from doing any kind of business activity with him, and virtually froze all his assets in the U.S.

== Arrest ==
At around 4:00 a.m. on March 4, 2015, Treviño Morales was captured inside a residence in Fuentes del Valle, an upper-class neighborhood in San Pedro Garza García, Nuevo León, by the Federal Police and the Mexican Army. Not a single shot was fired in the operation. In a nearby neighborhood, authorities arrested his financial operator Carlos Arturo Jiménez Encinas, along with four other people. Four days later he was transferred to the Federal Social Readaptation Center No. 1, a maximum-security prison in Almoloya de Juárez, State of Mexico. He was formally charged in a federal court in Toluca, State of Mexico on March 13 for money laundering and for violating Mexico's Federal Law of Firearms and Explosives.

=== Aftermath ===
On 23 March 2015, Ramiro Pérez Moreno (alias "El Rana" or "The Frog"), a potential successor of "Z-42", was captured along with 4 other men. He was arrested in possession of 6 kilos of cocaine and marijuana, rifles and one hand grenade.

=== Extradition to the United States ===
On 27 February 2025, Treviño along with 28 other narco figures were extradited to the United States. His brother Miguel would be extradited as well.

== See also ==
- Infighting in Los Zetas
- List of Mexico's 37 most-wanted drug lords
- Mexican drug war
