= Cártel del Noreste =

Mexican criminal organization

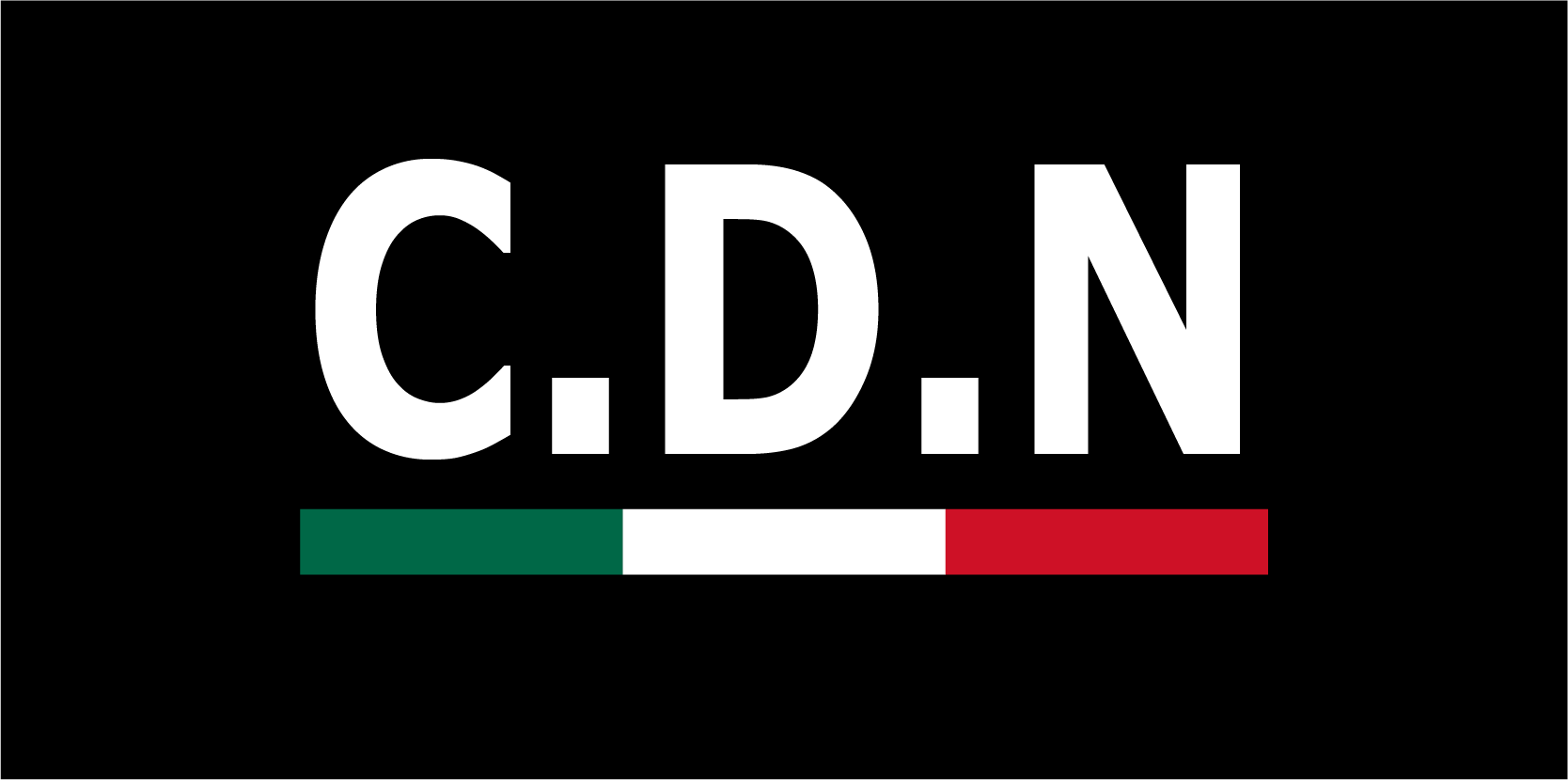
- CDN logo
- Founded: 2015
- Founding location: Nuevo Laredo, Tamaulipas, Mexico
- Years active: 2015−present
- Territory: Coahuila, Nuevo León, Tamaulipas, San Luis Potosí, Quintana Roo, Veracruz and Zacatecas
- Ethnicity: Mexican
- Membership (est.): 9,000
- Leader: Juan Cisneros Treviño
- Criminal activities: Drug trafficking, extortion, kidnapping, murder, oil theft, terrorism and narcoterrorism
- Rivals: CJNG; Gulf Cartel; Zetas Vieja Escuela; La Línea (Juaréz Cartel); Sinaloa Cartel

The Cártel del Noreste (Spanish pronunciation: [ˈkaɾtel ðel noˈɾeste], Northeast Cartel) is a Mexican criminal organization and U.S.-designated Foreign Terrorist Organization that splintered from Los Zetas following the capture of their last absolute leader, Omar Treviño Morales. Their main criminal activities are kidnapping, extortion, vehicle theft, human trafficking, drug trafficking, money laundering, as well as the control of local activities such as prostitution, and illegal human trafficking, among others. They have total control of the border city of Nuevo Laredo, its main base. They are said to have an operational presence in the United States, Guatemala, Honduras and Colombia. In the latter, it is believed that they took away the cocaine purchasing business from Los Zetas, after their disappearance as a criminal group.

== History ==
=== Background ===
The Treviño Morales family was formed by Rodolfo Treviño and María Arcelia Morales, who had a total of 13 children, of which 6 started in crime at a very early age. The family had a relationship with the gang Los Texas (later absorbed by the Gulf Cartel in 2001), which controlled the city of Nuevo Laredo. That was where Miguel Ángel, Juan Francisco and Omar Treviño Morales began their criminal life. On December 29, 1993, in a random search by the United States Customs Service, Juan Francisco's vehicle was stopped and he denied on two occasions that he had more 10 thousand dollars in cash. When searching the car, US$47,984 was found, which was confiscated.

Unlike many other members of Los Zetas, Miguel Ángel did not have a military career in the Army. He was recruited by Osiel Cárdenas Guillén, head of the Gulf Cartel, to work as one of the cartel's main couriers. His main virtues were speaking English fluently and having contacts in the United States, which helped Osiel in his business in the US. As a messenger, he gained the trust of Osiel's family, while he grew in the leadership of Los Texas, a gang dedicated to dominating the territory of Nuevo Laredo. There, Miguel began to collect floor rights from the rest of criminal organizations that tried to operate in the area. After seeing his growth, Osiel Cárdenas put him at the service of his brother Antonio Ezequiel Cárdenas Guillén, and he was named one of the main hitmen of the organization. Miguel Ángel Treviño Morales was captured in 2013. After his arrest, the command of the organization passed to his brother, Omar Treviño Morales.

=== Formation ===
After the capture of Omar Treviño Morales (aka Z-42) in 2015, and after the capture of Ramiro Pérez Ramos, "El Rama" just a month later, Z-42's brother Juan Francisco Treviño Morales attempted to assume leadership of Los Zetas due to the discontent of other leaders and members since they accused Treviño of snitching on other leaders, such as Ramiro Pérez Ramos. This dispute over leadership led to clashes between the different factions of Los Zetas for control of the territories, which led to the fracture of the organization.

After the division of Los Zetas, two criminal groups were formed, which became involved in a dispute for control of Tamaulipas, these factions are the Zetas Vieja Escuela, who are led by original members of Los Zetas as well as members who became disillusioned with the leadership of the Treviño family. They are aligned with their original employers, the Gulf Cartel. The Cártel del Noreste, a name given by Juan Francisco Treviño Morales to his Zetas faction and its creation was immediately made public, understanding that its main bastion would be Nuevo Laredo.

=== Organizational leadership ===
Juan Francisco Treviño Morales alias Kiko was allegedly arrested in September 2016 by the DEA in Houston. Command of the Northeast Cartel was assumed by Juan Gerardo Treviño Morales alias El Huevo. On 10 February 2020, Pablo César "G" alias El Takia, main lieutenant of the cartel in Nuevo Laredo, was arrested in the state of Tamaulipas, accused of participating in the execution of five officials of the then State Attorney General's Office that occurred on the night of 4 January 2017 in the Nuevo Laredo Municipality. On 26 March, 11 members of the cartel were arrested who, in various actions derived from intelligence operations, police officers seized weapons of various calibers, vehicles, cartridges, drugs and tactical equipment, in Torreón Municipality, Coahuila. On 4 August 2020, Guadalupe Villarreal Gómez "N" and her partner were arrested in the municipality of Nuevo Laredo, the leader of a faction of the Northeast Cartel. She was assigned to various municipalities in both the south and north of the state in which she maintained relationships with criminal leaders such as the Gulf Cartel and Los Zetas.

On 13 March 2022, Juan Gerardo Treviño Chávez alias El Huevo, leader of Cártel del Noreste since 2016, was arrested after an operation in the Hidalgo neighborhood in Nuevo Laredo, Tamaulipas. There were several confrontations and blockades in the city, among which 38 armed attacks against several military bases stand out, as well as an attack directed at the United States Consulate, due to its danger and relevance in the structure of the organization. To stop any rescue attempt by his criminal group, after his arrest and seizure he was transported by helicopter to Piedras Negras, Coahuila, guarded by the National Guard, Army and Mexican Air Force. He was later transported to the City of Mexico where he was held until the night of Monday, March 14 to be deported to the United States, where he has American citizenship and an arrest warrant against him since he was in Mexico illegally.

== See also ==
- List of Mexican cartels
- List of Mexican drug lords
- List of Mexican states by homicide rate
