= Security policy of the Enrique Peña Nieto administration =

The security policy of the Enrique Peña Nieto administration that governed Mexico from 1 December 2012 to 30 November 2018 prioritized the reduction of violence rather than attacking Mexico's drug trafficking organizations head-on, marking a departure from the strategy of the previous six years during Felipe Calderón's administration. Peña Nieto has set up a number of conceptual and organizational changes from the past regime policy, and one of the biggest contrasts is the focus on lowering murder rates, kidnappings, and extortions, as opposed to arresting or killing the country's most-wanted drug lords and intercepting their drug shipments. The government of Calderón, however, has justified its position by stating that the current violence in the country is a necessary stage in Mexico's drug war, as weakening criminal groups fight for territorial control against one another and the government. Moreover, part of Peña Nieto's strategy also consists on the creation of a national police made up of 40,000 members, known as a "gendarmerie." He also proposed on centralizing the sub-federal police forces under one command. The president-elect emphasized that he does not support the involvement or presence of armed U.S. agents in Mexico, but considers allowing the United States to instruct Mexico's military training in counterinsurgency tactics. Beyond that, Peña Nieto promised that no other measures will be taken by the U.S. in Mexico. While campaigning, Peña Nieto appointed a former general of the National Police of Colombia as his external advisor for public security, and boldly promised to reduce 50% of the murder rates in Mexico by the end of his six-year term.

Critics of Peña Nieto's security strategy, however, say that he offered "little sense" in exactly how he will reduce the violence. During the three-month campaign, Peña Nieto was not explicit on his anti-crime strategy, and many analysts wonder whether Peña Nieto is holding back politically sensitive details in his security strategy or simply does not know yet how he will squelch the violence and carry out the next stage in Mexico's drug war. Moreover, U.S. officials were concerned that the return of Peña Nieto's Institutional Revolutionary Party (PRI) to power may mean returning to the old PRI tactics of "corruption [and] backroom deals" with the cartels in exchange for bribes and relative peace. Peña Nieto later denied that he would negotiate with the cartels.

== Security policy ==
=== Kingpin strategy ===
Throughout the administration of Felipe Calderón, the Mexican government argued that the arrests of the top leaders in the drug trafficking organizations did not lead to violence. In a new public campaign, the government released 10 videos that explained the "myths" behind Mexico's drug war, one of them including the so-called "kingpin strategy," which focuses on taking down the drug lords and leaders of the drug cartels. The government's counterargument against critiques was that killing or arresting drug kingpins had no effect on the already rising murder rates in an area. In some cases, however, the government argued that violence went down after a drug kingpin was taken out. The most common critique against the kingpin strategy is that arresting or killing leaders in criminal organizations leaves a leadership void, fracturing the cartels and allowing rival groups to take over the assets of the cartel. The theory is used to explain why violence has spiked in the states of Tamaulipas and Nuevo León, where the arrest of the Gulf cartel's leader – Osiel Cárdenas Guillén – led to the split of the two groups that composed the organization: the Gulf Cartel and Los Zetas. Back in 2010, the state of Chihuahua lived a similar phenomenon with the rupture of the Sinaloa Cartel and the Beltrán Leyva cartel after the military gunned down Arturo Beltrán Leyva, a top leader in the Beltrán Leyva cartel. Calderón has a different interpretation of the situation, however. He argues that taking down the kingpins does not increase the violence in states that are already among the most dangerous in Mexico. By this theory, the army was sent in to restore order in states already plagued with violence; hence, their presence is a product, not a cause, of the rising murder rates.

Peña Nieto, however, said in a news conference that he can ease the waves of violence in Mexican drug war by redirecting the focus of the military approach carried out by Mexico's current president, Felipe Calderón. Instead of focusing primarily on taking down the heads of the criminal organizations and the most-wanted drug lords of the cartels, he proposes to use government resources to put down homicides, kidnappings, and extortions—crimes that do the most damage to the Mexican people—by flooding troops and police into places with the highest rates of violence crimes. Peña Nieto, however, said that his proposal does not mean that the government will not tackle other crimes nor prevent drug trafficking, but rather noted that arresting drug bosses will no longer be the focus of his administration. Opponents of Peña Nieto have said that the PRI's return will mean the going back to the "old PRI model" of making deals with the cartels. Nonetheless, the presidential candidate has praised Calderón's decision of sending in troops to fight the cartels, and has emphasized plans to increase the military presence in areas most affected by drug-related violence, like Monterrey and Veracruz. The security policy of Peña Nieto does not say that it will stop fighting the drug cartels; it proposes that it will simply shift away from targeting the heads of the cartels. This redirection is a response to the criticism made by critics to Calderón for targeting a few main cartels and splitting them up into smaller and more violent factions. Peña Nieto's strategy would align with a new strain of thinking for the general public, which calls for law enforcement in both the United States and Mexico to make the reduction of violence, kidnappings, and extortion their overwhelming focus in the war on drugs. According to Reuters, other experts argue that Mexico's criminal groups do not have to be provoked and often ambush Mexico's security forces when they are on patrol, and that the cartels have become so violent that the Mexican government will have no other option but to keep battling them – whether they want to or not.

Nonetheless, Eric Olson, a U.S.-Mexico security co-operation scholar from the Woodrow Wilson International Center for Scholars, advocates a similar strategy for the reduction of violence. Olson acknowledged that the government should slow down its attacks against cartels that are less violent than others, and focus on Mexico's "biggest problem, the violence that is terrorizing the population and undermining the legitimacy of the state." Olson said that crime will always exist, but one can make it less harmful by getting it out of people's lives as much as possible. He concluded by saying that this proposal is not a "de facto negotiation" with the cartels—but rather a question of what comes first. Some U.S. officials, however, are concerned that Peña Nieto's strategy will mean the return to the old and corrupt practices of the PRI regime, where the government made deals and turned a blind eye on the cartels in exchange for peace. After all, they worry that Mexico's drug war, which has cost over 50,000 lives, will make Mexicans question on why they should "pay the price for a US drug habit." Peña Nieto denies, however, that his party will tolerate corruption and stated he will not make deals with the cartels. On 1 July 2012, the day of the election, the president-elect said the following:

"The fight against crime will continue, yes, with a new strategy to reduce violence and above all protect the lives of all Mexicans ... Let it be very clear: There will be no deal, no truce with organized crime."

— Enrique Peña Nieto

=== Gendarmerie ===
Peña Nieto has repeated throughout his campaign that he will build a new 40,000-member paramilitary police that will be dispatched to the areas plagued by drug-violence. The creation of the "national gendarmerie" is planned to be bigger than the size of the Federal police, with added patrols, greater intelligence, and made up by soldiers already deployed during the sexenio of Felipe Calderón. His aim in the creation of this new police, besides reducing the violence, is supporting the municipalities with major institutional weakness, since he said that some municipalities in Mexico lack a police force. The success of the new gendarmerie is largely going to be reflected on its funding level; for years, Mexico has reorganized, renamed, and created new security organizations because the past agencies have proven to be inefficient and corrupt. The funding capacity of the government will therefore be crucial for the success of the gendarmerie, because if it is poorly funded it will most likely be infiltrated by the drug trafficking organizations and be doomed to failure.

The new gendarmerie will be deployed mostly to rural areas, but security experts have mentioned that moving security resources out of the urban areas may be troubling for cities. The idea of such a force appears to be a response to the assuaging critics of Felipe Calderón's overwhelming dependence on the Mexican Armed Forces to confront the drug cartels. Human rights advocates and policy experts said that the use of the troops brought human rights violations, and emphasized the building of a capable civilian police force. Peña Nieto's new gendarmerie, however, will be composed of ranks from the Mexican military, raising doubts on whether or not his proposal will simply be a repackaging of Calderón's military-led strategy. In addition, Alejandro Hope, a security expert and former member of the CISEN, Mexico's intelligence agency, wrote in May 2012 about the unanswered questions regarding the creation of the new gendarmerie. In one case, he wrote that the creation of Peña Nieto's new police force will not be much different from keeping the current troops under a military command. As Hope points out, "unless the [new gendarmerie] is magic," the scenario will be the same people performing the same duties and with the same equipment. In a second scenario, Hope wrote how the military will actively support the gendarmerie in problem areas. Consequently, he pointed out that this scenario will eliminate the only advantage of having a gendarmerie: lacking any involvement or command from a military unit. The final critique of Hope was the idea that the new gendarmerie will be made up of ex-military members. He points out that the two largest pools to get these kind of people would be from retired or deserters of the Armed Forces, neither which Hope considers desirable members in a gendarmerie. According to InSight Crime, the gendarmerie proposal issued by Peña Nieto gives critics an opening to suggest that he is "playing to the frustrations of the Mexican people" and suggesting police reforms simply for the sake of changing Calderón's strategy, even if it does not improve the security measures throughout Mexico.

The force's impact would also depend on how it is used. If Peña Nieto decides to shift the gendarmerie from hotspot to hotspot and not allow the force to pave its continuity in a given area, it may have little impact in putting down the violence. Nonetheless, if Peña Nieto decides to focus the gendarmerie to target certain cells within the cartels that are involved extortions and kidnappings, it may be successful.

According to a 2013 report published by the Washington Office on Latin America looking at the first year of Peña Nieto's administration, the gendarmerie, originally advertised as a 40,000-member paramilitary police force, will be reduced to 5,000 civilian members within the Federal Police, and will not be operational until July 2014.

==== Colombian advisor ====
Peña Nieto promised that if he was voted in, he would appoint Óscar Naranjo as his security advisor, a prominent Colombian police general. Naranjo is highly qualified for the job, having already lived the transformation of a discredited police force in Colombia. In the 1980s, when Naranjo was a young officer, Colombia's police force had very similar problem to the one in Mexico: almost all the police was under the payroll and service of the drug lords. Today, the National Police of Colombia is a model of reform in Latin America and often train police forces around the hemisphere. As head of the police force, Naranjo's "single greatest achievement" was Colombia's creation of the most effective and sophisticated intelligence agency in the region. According to InSight Crime, Naranjo has worked closely with several corrupt officials, and accused on more than one occasion of being corrupt himself. But although rarely acknowledged, working on a regular basis with officials one cannot trust and gently discharging them with minimal harm like Naranjo did is essential to reform efforts. CS Monitor alleges that Naranjo knew how to marginalize corrupt officials and maximize the use of his honest personnel. Nonetheless, Naranjo will be working in Mexico, a country with twice the population of Colombia, and with many of the police forces working at a municipal and state level and out of the federal control. The bureaucratic and political challenges that Naranjo will face in Mexico may stifle his attempts to reform the country's police force. Naranjo will also be handling a different organizational structure, which may perpetuate "political battles" between the SPP, the Secretariat of National Defense, and the Attorney General of Mexico over who keeps certain resources, information, and prestige.

Peña Nieto promises that Naranjo's incorporation will bring Mexico into a robust focus on the financial networks of the cartels, just like the strategy that was implemented in Colombia. Nonetheless, it is still unclear whether attacking the financial sectors of the drug cartels will bring down the violence. According to The Huffington Post, Naranjo said that the new gendarmerie will not just target major drug traffickers, but mid-level and lower-level cartel hitmen as a way of reducing the violence. He also mentioned that Peña Nieto might fulfill his promise of bringing down the number of murders and kidnappings by 50% during his six years as president. The tactic used by Naranjo in Colombia has generated questions whether that strategy could produce similar results in a different country. In addition, according to InSight Crime, it is highly unlikely that Peña Nieto will bring such a drop in the murder rate with his security policies alone. However, there are tentative signs as of 2012 that the violence in Mexico is already peaking and that the cartels are opting for policies of more cautiousness and lower visibility, which could mean that it could begin to decline significantly during Peña Nieto's administration.

=== Drug legalization debates ===
During an interview with PBS NewsHour as president-elect, Peña Nieto said that Mexico – along with Latin America and the United States – should have a debate about drug legalization and the regulation of drug sales in the country, an approach advocated by some Latin American leaders who want to reduce the revenues of the drug trafficking organizations by legalizing marijuana. He insisted, however that he is not in favor of legalizing narcotics, but is in favor of opening a new debate to fight drug trafficking. According to Peña Nieto, the war on drugs has not provided positive results because it has not reduced drug consumption nor drug trafficking, which means that the policy is "not moving in the right direction." Peña Nieto also spoke with Fareed Zakaria in an airing interview through CNN where he called for a "new debate" on the drug war, saying the U.S. should play a major role in the discussion and stating:

"Yes, I do believe we should open up a new debate regarding how to wage war on drug trafficking. Personally, I'm not in favor of legalizing drugs. I'm not persuaded by that as an argument. However, let's open up a new debate, a review, in which the U.S. plays a fundamental role in conducting this review ... What we seek now in our new strategy is to adjust what's been done up until now. It is not a radical change. It is to broaden the coverage and above all, the emphasis I aspire to of reducing the violence in Mexico."

— Enrique Peña Nieto

By arguing that the legalization debate should be discussed, Peña Nieto is echoing that Mexico is prepared to move in the direction that several leaders in Latin America have openly debated. During the 6th Summit of the Americas in April 2012, for the first time, many leaders in the Latin American world debated at the summit – although behind closed doors – whether they should stop following the "U.S.-sponsored-and-dictated" war on drugs, partially legalize drugs, or regulate the drug trade. According to The Huffington Post, the debate reached President Barack Obama, but coverage of the debate by the U.S. media was lessened because of competition from an embarrassing sex scandal involving the U.S. Secret Service and some prostitutes. Nevertheless, the message from the Latin America leaders was clear: "[they] no longer accept the American line on drug policy."

=== United States partnership ===
Peña Nieto wants to expand Mexico's drug war partnership with the United States, but discarded the presence of armed U.S. agents in Mexico. Moreover, the president-elect supported hosting U.S. military training on Mexican soil, but only for training purposes and to help the Mexican Armed Forces benefit from the U.S. counterinsurgency tactics learned in the Iraq War and in the War in Afghanistan. He also approved the continuation of flights by U.S. surveillance drones to gather information on drug trafficking, but stated that further missions would be handled by the Mexican authorities with assistance and technology from the United States. Moreover, the incorporation of the former Colombian police general Óscar Naranjo signals that Peña Nieto will be a solid partner with the U.S., since Naranjo is close to the U.S. military and law-enforcement agencies.

Unlike countries like Honduras, Guatemala, and Colombia, where the U.S. combats drug trafficking side-by-side with local police and the military, Peña Nieto resisted similar joint operations by claiming that they would violate Mexico's sovereignty and its written Constitution. There are no U.S. military bases in Mexico; and by law, American-law enforcement agents are not allowed to carry any weapons in Mexico, even for personal protection.

A report issued by the United States Senate in July 2012 concluded that the deployment of the military to fight against organized crime in Mexico has largely been "ineffective" and has increased the homicide rates in the country. It was written to help guide Congress towards the new strategy of Peña Nieto, who suggested that his regime will focus on bringing down the violence rather than arresting and killing top drug barons and carrying out drug seizures heading to the world's largest drug consumer, the United States. Rather than giving away billions of dollars in equipment to Mexico, the report urges for a policy change towards teaching and training Mexico's police, who are outgunned and corrupted by the criminal groups. Overall, the report offers an assessment that may take years, perhaps even a whole generation, to materialize. In the report, a statement concluded the following:

"Mexico's presidential transition provides a new window to discuss and debate the best security strategies to deal with the serious violence plaguing Mexico ... As the political landscape continues to change in both countries, this report underscores the importance of continuity in two critical areas — judicial and police reform."

— United States Senate Committee on Foreign Relations

In response to the report, the Federal government of Mexico rejected the claims of the U.S. Senate and stated that the government has worked extensively to disband the criminal groups, reform its courts and judicial system, improve its Federal Police, and strengthen the capacity of the Mexican Armed Forces. They also warned that their actions will be worthless and insufficient if the United States does not assume responsibility in stopping the flow of weapons to Mexico, combating money laundering, and reducing drug consumption.

== Controversies and accusations towards the Mexican government of misuse of the PGR and its resources ==
=== Accusations of lack of protection towards news journalists and of misuse of Pegasus software to spy them ===
Far from only being receiving accusations of spreading fake news, the Mexican government of EPN has also been accused of violence towards news journalists, and of spying on them, and also towards civil right leaders and their families. During his tenure as president, Peña Nieto has been accused of failing to protect news journalists, whose deaths are speculated to be politically triggered, by politicians attempting to prevent them from covering political scandals. The New York Times published a news report on the matter titled, "In Mexico it's easy to kill a journalist", on it mentioning how during EPN's government, Mexico became one of the worst countries in which to be a journalist. The assassination of journalist Javier Valdez on May 23, 2017, received national coverage, with multiple news journalists asking for "real protection", as well as freedom of speech. The president announced to be "deeply wounded" by such death, Despite this Mexican citizens, as well as political party of opposition perceived the presidential words as hypocritical, and the outlook does not look favorable with Mexico already leading as the country most journalist killed in 2017, with 5 assassinations.

On June 19, 2017, The New York Times in conjunction with news reporter Carmen Aristegui, and even backed by a Televisa news reporter Carlos Loret de Mola, reported that the Mexican Government uses a spyware software known as Pegasus, to spy on targets such as Mexican News reporters (and their families) and Civil Rights Leaders (and their families) using text messages as lures. Since 2011, the Mexican Government invested $80 million worth of spyware. Pegasus spyware infiltrates a person's cellphone and reports every detail of their messages, e-mails, contacts and calendars. After the revelation, the Israeli manufacturer of the Pegasus spyware, NSO Group, re-stated it only sold such technology to governments with an 'explicit agreement', that such technology was meant 'only to combat organized crime' by spying on it; although once it sells the software it cannot control who they use it against and basically leaves the governments on their own to monitor themselves on not abusing the software. The New York Times and independent forensic analysts analyzed the data of 'dozens of messages', multiple times before proving their accusation, and commented of such espionage towards news journalists and civil rights leaders, as 'an effort from the Mexican Government to thwart the battle against corruption infecting every limb of Mexican Society', and how highly unlikely it would be for such espionage it to receive 'Judicial Approval'. Edward Snowden who worked for US government's NSA before revealing it to spy on its citizens, also said all evidence points to the Mexican government being the spy, and on Twitter said it is "a crime to the public".

The hacking attempts were 'highly personalized' for each target, they would consist of sending text messages with an attached link, and for the spyware to enter a users smartphone, all it needed was for the smartphone owner to click on the link. The news reporter Carmen Aristegui, whom previously in 2014, had revealed a conflict of interest regarding the president ownership of a Mexican "Casa Blanca (White House)" and was unfairly fired from her job for airing such investigation, herself, received 22 hacking attempts, the most for any journalist who has been found targeted, one of those attempts disguised as a message sent by an American Embassy in Mexico, trying to help her with a problem with her Visa; additionally Aristegui's son Emilio Aristegui received attempts for 23 months despite being an under-age 16-year-old teen. News media perceived attempts at Aristegui as revenge from the Mexican government. News reporter Carlos Loret de Mora received 8 attempts. While, Juan E. Pardinas, the director of the Mexican Institute of Competitiveness, also received multiple attempts where he was told men with guns were outside his house and another where a contact not on his list invited him to his father's funeral because saying he was a "close friend", the attempt on his wife went as far as claiming Padilla was having an extramarital affair, but she could only see the evidence if she clicked the link. Also, most of the parents, protesters and the major leaders of the investigations of the "Ayotzinapa, 43 Students Massacre" received spyware messages, so did the "Women of Atenco" (a scandal directly tied to Enrique Peña Nieto's time as Governor of the State of Mexico).The New York Times article contained a picture of EPN.

On June 20, 2017, the day after. The opposition political party, National Action Party (PAN) denounced the Mexican government to the Inter-American Commission on Human Rights for suspicions of violations towards human rights and requested them, to lead an investigation citing such spying causes violations towards the article 16th of the Mexican Constitution, as well as violating article 11th of the Universal Declaration of Human Rights. While, in response to the accusations, Peña Nieto made public that such technology was bought and indeed used by the Mexican government, but he denied misuses, and stated that it was only used to protect Mexicans by searching for criminal by saying he "also felt spied upon, but there was nothing more fake than blaming the (Mexican) government", and that there was "no proof"; saying he ordered the PGR an investigation and that he hoped "under the law, it can be applied against those that have raised false accusations against the government.", with the last part of the quote making journalist hacking victims feel threatened. Which forced the Mexican president to call writer of the article Azam Ahmed to tell him, he was not menacing him. However, due to his previous presidential scandals, Peña Nieto words lacked credibility to most Mexicans, with journalists like Jorge Ramos complaining about how Enrique Peña Nieto remains in power despite his illegal actions. Later on the day political rival Andrés Manuel López Obrador (AMLO) who competed for the presidency against EPN in 2012 and intends to compete again in 2018 as the candidate from the MORENA political party, was also revealed to be among the hacking targets, with his son also as a target. On June 23, 2017, the National Human Rights Commission (Mexico) opened a case regarding the government espionage.

=== Accusations of the Internal Security Law violating Human rights ===
In November 2017, Aristegui Noticias reported that "the PRI and their allies were seeking to approve the "Ley de Seguridad Interior (Law of Internal Security)". Whom the Mexican National Human Rights Commission (CNDH) had previously said, that it violated Human Rights, because it favors the discretional usage of the army forces. Endangering citizens by giving a blank check to the army" and the president, to order an attack towards any group of people they consider a danger without requiring an explanation. This could include people such as social activists. Enrique Peña Nieto signed off the law in approval, while CNDH decided to demand the Mexican government until the law fits criteria that do not violate human rights.

=== Accusations towards EPN's government blocking its own investigations against corruption and of misuse of the PGR to interfere in the presidential election 2018 ===
New York Times published an article of December 2017, describing accusations towards EPN's government blocking its own investigations against corruption in the Mexican government, with a commissioner saying the Mexican government preventing the establishment of an impartial leader in the FEPADE in charge of investigating political corruption. Previously mentioned 22 ex-governors all members of the PRI political party are investigated for corruption with only five jailed.

By March 2018 in the dawn of the next presidential election, the PGR made official an investigation regarding PAN's candidate Ricardo Anaya laundering money. Ex-chief of FEPADE (the Mexican government's branch focused on political crimes), Santiago Nieto, whom the previous October had been controversially removed from his job as chief of FEPADE, coincidentally right after starting an investigation regarding illicit campaign money from the 2012 presidential campaign, received by EPN and would be president of Pemex, Emilio Lozoya from the Brazilian conglomerate Odebrecht. The ex-chief of FEPADE, said that the accusations towards Anaya were minor in comparison to Odebretch and EPN scandal, adding also the same opinion about the money lost by SEDESOL, to corrupt governors from the PRI such as Javier Duarte and Cesar Duarte, all while PRI's presidential candidate Jose Antonio Meade was the man in charge of SEDESOL (the scandal is known as "La Estafa Maestra (The Master Robbery)" and about $435 million pesos were lost). The same week the PRI legislators were criticized for voting towards stopping the investigation of Odebretch against the wishes of Mexican people and organizations against corruption such as "Mexicanos contra la corrupcion (Mexicans against Corruption)". The investigation about Odebretch against Pemex leader at the time Lozoya, was legally stopped after, a judge controversially ordered it days after. Satiago Nieto said that the PGR was being used as tool by EPN's government to tamper elections and benefit Meade by removing Anaya from the race, complaining that it was not neutral the manner in whom the law enforcing organizations had made more effort to investigate Anaya in a month than towards investigating EPN's Odebretch money and Meade's SEDESOL lost money in the last six years. Going as far as saying the PGR and FEPADE were only attacking the rivals of the PRI, and saying the organizations were not being neutral.

Javier Duarte went to jail in 2017, though, Cesar Duarte despite the overwhelming evidence against him, in March 2018, the PGR found him innocent of any crime. The successor governor Javier Corral from the PAN, who previously fought against the Televisa law, gave a similar opinion to Santiago Nieto, saying the PGR was being used to protect the allies of EPN and the PRI, and attack their rivals. AMLO said that not preceding towards Duarte, is one of the main reasons Mexicans lost their faith in the PRI, saying the few ex-governors declared criminals were only to simulate they care.

In an interview with The Wall Street Journal, Santiago Nieto would later reveal that EPN's government tried to bribe him to keep him silent, which he refused saying “Sorry, but I can't receive any money from Peña Nieto.”, he received menaces through phone messages with the words "Death follows you" and "Words of advice: stay out of Trouble", as a consequence he revealed to fear for the life of himself and his family.

== See also ==
- War on drugs
- Mexican drug war
- Institutional Revolutionary Party
- 2011–2012 in the Mexican Drug War
