= José Treviño Morales =

Mexican drug money launderer

- Treviño Morales after winning competition.
- Occupations: Money laundering, horse racing, horse breeding
- Employer: Los Zetas
- Spouse: Zulema Treviño
- Relatives: Miguel Treviño Morales (Brother); Omar Treviño Morales (Brother)

José Treviño Morales is a Mexican former money launderer for Los Zetas, a Mexican criminal organization. He is the brother of the former Zetas leaders Omar Treviño Morales (alias Z-42) and Miguel Treviño Morales (alias Z-40). In 2008, Treviño funded a horserace operation in Oklahoma with money he made through money laundering. Nonetheless, he was arrested by the FBI along with seven others in a horse-breeding ranch in Lexington, Oklahoma on 12 June 2012. He was found guilty of money laundering in May 2013, and was sentenced to 20 years in prison by a U.S. federal court in September of that same year.

== Events ==
On 12 June 2012, federal agents raided some stables and a house ranch of Treviño Morales in New Mexico and Oklahoma respectively. Prosecutors accuse Treviño Morales and several others of running a money laundering operation connected with Mexico's most ruthless criminal organization, Los Zetas. Los Zetas are one of Mexico's most dangerous criminal groups, notorious for kidnapping, decapitating, and completely dismembering their victims to maintain their violent reputation. His older brother, Miguel Treviño Morales, the second-in-command of the cartel, is in the list of the most-wanted drug lords by the United States and Mexico; one of his favorite brutal techniques is known as the "guiso" (stew), where enemies are forcibly placed in a 55-gallon drums and then burned alive. After an indictment accusing Treviño Morales and others of laundering money, the U.S. authorities arrested 7 out of the 14 indicted, including Treviño Morales and his wife, Zulema. They could face up to 20 years in prison if convicted. Currently, there are no charges against Treviño Morales in Mexico.

The indictment alleges how Treviño Morales, his brothers, and his close associates arranged a network where they quietly purchased race horses with drug proceeds at auctions, to then disguise the source of the funds used by them to cover up the involvement of Los Zetas. When carrying out the transactions, they would often pay in large sums of cash, or use fake names, to cover up their identities and avoid being caught. Since 2008, Treviño Morales' operation generated millions of dollars in transactions from the states of California, New Mexico, Texas, and Oklahoma; the New York Times first reported on the raids and the operation's alleged connection with the Zetas, citing several anonymous sources and investigations. The operation, Tremor Enterprises LLC, started small but quickly generated huge profits and worked in plain sight. In fact, some of the horses used for the races had references to the drug world, like Coronita Cartel and Number One Cartel, to name a few. Over time, the horses of the operation were placed among the best in their industry. One of them named Mr. Piloto won $1 million at a race in Ruidoso Downs Race Track on Labor Day in 2010, going off the odds of 22–1. Another horse, the Tempting Dash, won the Dash for Cash race in Grand Prairie, Texas. Treviño's success in quarter-horse racing allowed him to hire top trainers and jockeys. His successful record allowed him to gain social status and get a popular magazine to cover his daughter's wedding, where many well-known figures in the horse racing industry attended.

After a number of wins, Treviño "stunned the quarter-horse world," winning competition after competition with unknown horses, and rising as a well-known figure within the racing community, where he even gave interviews.

=== Seizures and raids ===
At least a half-dozen federal agents wearing military-like uniforms and baseball caps with the FBI insignias stood by Treviño Morales's ranch in Oklahoma on 12 June 2012. The raid in Oklahoma netted to Treviño Morales and his associates; however, several other raids were carried out by federal agents across the states of Texas, New Mexico, and Oklahoma, where he had properties. Federal agents and prosecutors are trying to seize their properties, bank accounts, and horses. Authorities issued a seizure warrant for 41 horses that deemed most valuable to the money laundering operation in an effort to prevent them from being sent south into Mexico. The government ordered to ensure the care of the other 384 horses in the ranch. Nonetheless, it is difficult for the authorities to seize live animals because it is expensive to feed and take good care of them.

Several raids were also carried out by the Mexican authorities in Mexico; the arrest of several cartel members in the state of Veracruz was what led to the investigation of Treviño Morales' assets in the United States.

=== Raising suspicions ===
A day after Treviño Morales was arrested by federal agents, people in the Oklahoma ranching community claimed that he was a "good neighbor". Others recall Treviño as a "family-oriented, hardworking bricklayer" who had just moved from Texas to Oklahoma to raise horses. Nonetheless, his ranch – the Zule Farms – was seen suspiciously by many of his neighbors. According to reports by The Houston Chronicle, Treviño Morales was not laundering money discreetly; his tax records state that he made around $70,000 in 2008 and $58,000 in 2009, but he somehow managed to buy a giant spotlight for his ranch, buy huge portions of land during an economic recession, and make significant improvements to a company that was not known for making large profits. Neighbors questioned how Treviño Morales, his wife, and the company's associates could afford to buy top-notch horses all in cash. It is estimated by the prosecutors that Treviño Morales spent over 20 million U.S. dollars.

It wasn't just the cash payments that brought attention to Treviño Morales and caught the eyes of those in the racing industry. Treviño Morales had earned a reputation for always paying his bills and giving out handsome prices for some of the elite horses across the nation. "They paid their bills and didn't cause any trouble," the director of the Oklahoma Quarter Horse Racing Association said. While it is common for foreigners to pay in cash for their transactions in the horse racing industry, the payments of Treviño Morales were "noteworthy in value." The quality of the horses they were buying and the amount of money they would spend to buy them "raised some eyebrows."

== Aftermath ==
=== U.S. Security Warning ===
Following the arrest of Treviño Morales, the U.S. Embassy in Mexico issued a security message on 12 June 2012 for American citizens living or planning to travel to Mexico. The message asked Americans to be aware of the incident involving Treviño Morales' arrest, and asked them to be prepared for any violent retaliation by Los Zetas for the arrests. The embassy stated that given the history and resources of the drug trafficking organizations, Americans in Mexico should maintain low profile and heighten their awareness. The message, found on the official page of the Consulate General of the United States in the Mexican border city of Matamoros, Tamaulipas, states the following:

"The U.S. Embassy alerts U.S. citizens traveling and residing in Mexico to the enhanced potential for violence related to today’s arrests of Transnational Criminal Organization (TCO) associates and family members residing in the United States ... These arrests could result in some form of retaliation and/or anti-American violence ... maintain a low profile and a heightened sense of awareness."

Moreover, the communiqué urged Americans to defer non-essential travels to the state of Tamaulipas and register at their nearest embassy online, via phone call, or in person. Previously in February 2012, the United States Department of State issued security warnings to Americans in Mexico, but particularly in Tamaulipas. It prohibited Americans to travel outside the city limits of Reynosa, Nuevo Laredo, and Matamoros due to the risks of armed robberies and carjackings. The department also encouraged them to not frequent casinos or adult entertainment establishments within the cities, and established a midnight to 6 a.m. curfew. Most of the reported crimes, however, happen from Matamoros to Tampico on the Mexican Federal Highway 101, especially through the municipality of San Fernando, Tamaulipas and in northern Tampico.

=== Tamaulipas' response ===
The Government of the state of Tamaulipas rejected the security message issued by the U.S. government and classified it as an "overreaction." In their defense, the Mexican authorities noted that Tamaulipas is safeguarded by federal forces, and that there is currently no correlation between the arrest in the U.S. state of Oklahoma and the situation in Matamoros and the rest of Tamaulipas. They also said that the incident is merely a media backlash and ignores the efforts the Mexican government is implementing. Moreover, Julio Almanza Armas, a politician from Tamaulipas, stated through Milenio that the reality in Mexico is not how the U.S. portrays it. He said that the drug-related violence that occurs in Tamaulipas often happens in isolated circumstances. He accepted, however, that Mexico lives through harsh times, but reiterated his stance in support of Tamaulipas.

=== IRS's comment ===
After an indictment was unsealed on 12 June 2012, the chief of the Internal Revenue Service (IRS) criminal investigation stated the following:

"This case is a prime example of the ability of Mexican drug cartels to establish footholds in legitimate US industries and highlights the serious threat money laundering causes to our financial system."

— Richard Weber

Horse racing is a "perfect vehicle" for laundering money from drug proceeds and hiding it from the authorities. The drug industry makes billions of dollars a year, so drug traffickers often find themselves unable to ship the cash back to Mexico, and end up laundering it in the United States. Buying ranches across the U.S. is a viable way of laundering money. When the money is not laundered, it ends up in the hands of the territorial bosses for counting and further distribution. But when the cartels turn to laundering, they make "investments in racing quarter horses purchased via bulk currency payments, wire transfers, structured deposits and bulk currency deposits." With push-to-talk Nextels, BlackBerries, UHF/VHF radio communications, the Mexican cartels can oversee their laundering operations on U.S. soil.

Treviño Morales' money laundering case serves as a worrisome reminder that the operations of the Mexican drug cartels does not end at the U.S. border with Mexico. In addition to overseeing multimillion-dollar smuggling corridors, the drug trafficking organizations often launder their money in the United States. Of these, the state of Arizona was identified by federal agents in 2012 as the "consolidation point" for drug earnings. According to InSight Crime, what is more amazing than the Zetas' operation is the blatant manner in which they carried it out in the U.S. Treviño Morales made no efforts to hide his activities and wealth, had no problem giving interviews to journalists, and even called his horse "Number One Cartel." This attack is one of the most profitable money laundering schemes of Los Zetas, and is considered by the U.S. authorities as essential for the war on drugs, since it will hurt the Zetas financially and help dismantle the violent criminal syndicate.

=== Series of Zeta arrests ===
On 15 June 2012, three days after the arrest of Treviño Morales, his nephew – Juan Francisco Treviño (a.k.a. El Quico) – was arrested in the industrial city of Monterrey. He was accompanied by a cousin, two unidentified women, and a couple of AR-15 rifles. Jesús Chávez García, his cousin, was wanted by the United States for drug trafficking, and was one of the inmates that escaped during a massive jailbreak inside a prison in Nuevo Laredo, Tamaulipas in 2010. Days later, Francisco Antonio Colorado Cessa, a businessman from the Mexican state of Veracruz with deep ties with Los Zetas, turned himself in to the Mexican authorities. He was accused of acting as a straw purchaser of racehorses and securing contracts with worth up to $100 million in Mexico's national oil company, Pemex. Finally, Gregorio Villanueva Salas, nicknamed the Czar of Piracy for his involvement in the production and distribution of piracy products, was arrested by the on 14 June 2012. Aside from being a senior member in the Zetas' financial sector, Villanueva was responsible for carrying out grenade attacks on schools, media outlets, and military bases in the border city of Matamoros, Tamaulipas.

These series of arrests target those who were suspected of laundering millions of dollars for Los Zetas in the legitimate economy. This attack on the Zetas is a response to the long-standing criticisms made to Felipe Calderón for his security policies. In addition, it fits the proposed strategy of his likely successor, Enrique Peña Nieto. He announced that if voted in, he will appoint Óscar Naranjo as his security advisor, a prominent Colombian police general. Peña Nieto promises that Naranjo's incorporation will bring Mexico into a more robust focus on the financial networks of the criminal groups, just like the strategy that was implemented in Colombia. Nonetheless, it is still unclear whether attacking the financial sectors of the drug cartels will bring down the violence. But that is not to say that the series of arrests after the capture of Treviño Morales should not be deemed as noteworthy and significant.

== Court case ==
On 3 July 2012, Treviño Morales pleaded not guilty during a detention hearing in Austin, Texas. His attorney argued that he was not a risk to flee or commit a crime; the judge agreed with the attorney's statement, but said that Treviño Morales might possibly flee to Mexico if he was given bail. Treviño Morales, along with eight others, were set to go on trial on 22 October 2012 and the trial was expected to take two weeks in length.

Federal prosecutors stated they would present 30,000 pages of documents and over 2,000 recorded phone conversations to prosecute him.

On 9 May 2013, Treviño Morales was found guilty of money laundering by a Texan jury and faced up to 20 years in prison. On 5 September 2013, he was found guilty of the charges in a federal court in Austin, Texas and sentenced to 20 years.

== Bank of America laundering scheme ==
According to the Federal Bureau of Investigation (FBI), Los Zetas used several accounts at the Bank of America corporation to hide money and invest it in the horse racing operation headed by Treviño Morales. The money was allegedly held in bank accounts in Charlotte, North Carolina with the ultimate goal of appearing as a legitimate source of income for Treviño Morales' purchases. Bank of America is not accused of any wrongdoing, and according to reports of The Wall Street Journal, the bank is actually cooperating with the FBI. Los Zetas laundered more than $1 million US dollars in this scheme.
