= Iván Velázquez Caballero =

Mexican drug lord (born 1970)

- Born: February 10, 1970 (age 56); Nuevo Laredo, Tamaulipas, Mexico
- Other names: L-50; Z-50; El Talibán
- Employer: Los Zetas
- Opponent: Miguel Treviño Morales
- Criminal charges: Drug trafficking and money laundering
- Criminal penalty: 30 years in prison (2017)
- Criminal status: Imprisoned

Iván Velázquez Caballero (born February 10, 1970), also known by his alias El Talibán, is a Mexican convicted drug lord of the criminal group known as Los Zetas. The government of Mexico listed Velázquez Caballero in 2009 as one of its 37 most-wanted drug lords and was offering up to $30 million pesos, the equivalent of over $2.5 million USD, for information leading to his capture.

When he was a teenager, Velázquez Caballero began stealing cars in Nuevo Laredo, Tamaulipas, his hometown. At the age of twenty-two, he was arrested for car theft and was imprisoned at a local jail. Upon his release, Velázquez Caballero met Héctor Sauceda Gamboa and was appointed as the regional boss of the cartel in Nuevo Laredo. By 2007, Velázquez Caballero was relocated to the state of Zacatecas, where he commanded a group of over 400 men. He later ascended to the top echelons of Los Zetas and became a major financial operator and money launderer for the criminal organization. In 2012, he was served as a top commander in several states across Mexico.

Velázquez Caballero was arrested by the Mexican Navy on 26 September 2012 in the state of San Luis Potosí. Prior to his arrest, Los Zetas had divided and Velázquez Caballero's faction had been fighting against Miguel Treviño Morales, the leader of the organization, causing a series of massacres and shootings in northern Mexico.

== Criminal career ==
Velázquez Caballero was born on 10 February 1970 in the border city of Nuevo Laredo, Tamaulipas. During his childhood, he befriended Miguel Treviño Morales, who would later become the leader of Los Zetas and his fierce rival. When he was 14 years old, Velázquez Caballero initiated his criminal career by stealing cars in Nuevo Laredo; at the age of 22, he was imprisoned at La Loma penitentiary for car theft, and eventually began to work for Hector Sauceda Gamboa.

Upon his release from prison, he then became the regional boss of the Gulf Cartel in Nuevo Laredo and was eventually sent to the state of Zacatecas in 2007, where he reportedly had around 400 men at his beck and call. Velázquez Caballero was also a top financial operator and money launderer for Los Zetas.

Unlike the original members of Los Zetas who joined the organization in the 1990s, Velázquez Caballero was not a former member of the Mexican Armed Forces. He is one of the few to rise to the leadership of the group that is not a military defector. Vazquez Caballero, much like Treviño Morales began working for the local Nuevo Laredo gangs then eventually for Grupo L or the Lobos of the Gulf Cartel before eventually becoming a part of Los Zetas.

As Velázquez Caballero ascended in the Gulf Cartel and Los Zetas, he traded his code name L-50 for the fearsome nickname El Talibán, a likely reference to the decapitation techniques practiced by Los Zetas and to the Islamist militant group based in Afghanistan, the Taliban.

=== Los Zetas infighting ===
The infighting between two factions in the Los Zetas, one led by Heriberto Lazcano Lazcano, alias El Lazca, and the other led by Miguel Treviño Morales, alias Z-40, reportedly began in mid 2012. Security analysts, however, believe that Velázquez Caballero was working alongside Lazcano to kill Treviño Morales.

Amid the power struggle between the two Zeta leaders, Velázquez Caballero supposedly separated from Los Zetas and decided to join forces with the Knights Templar Cartel and Gulf Cartel, the Zeta's former allies, to put down Treviño Morales, whom they deemed as a traitor. Since late 2011, Velázquez Caballero had announced his discontent for Treviño Morales through a series of public banners left behind in several parts of northeastern Mexico and by uploading several videos on YouTube, where he accused him of setting up the arrests or deaths of his own men.

==== San Luis Potosí massacre ====
The Mexican police found 14 dead bodies stuffed inside a SUV on 9 August 2012 along a highway in the city of San Luis Potosí. The massacre bore all signs of organized crime, but it was not immediately clear which drug group was responsible for the attack. This massacre was the sixth time in recent months that the cartels had dumped fourteen bodies in Mexico, suggesting that the number 14 is a secret code among the cartels. The number "14" may possibly be a reference to Z-14, a popular deceased commander of Los Zetas named Efraín Teodoro Torres, or to the fourteen original founders.

Initial reports attributed the attack to the Gulf Cartel and other drug gangs united against Los Zetas; nonetheless, the Mexican authorities concluded that the wave of violence San Luis Potosí in August 2012 was due to a feud between rival groups within Los Zetas. Reportedly, the fourteen bodies dumped were members of the Coahuila-based faction led by Velázquez Caballero (Z-50 or El Talibán), one of the leaders of the organization. They had been killed by a hit squad working for Miguel Treviño Morales (Z-40), another high-ranking leader in the cartel.

One of the victims managed to survive the attack by faking his death and letting the attackers pile him with the other bodies. He then fled the scene when the assassins were distracted and notified that authorities of the mass killing; reportedly, the man told the authorities that the alliance between El Talibán and Z-40 was over. It was later confirmed that the massacre was triggered after Velázquez Caballero's desire to leave Los Zetas and form an alliance with the Gulf Cartel to backlash Treviño Morales' faction.

Édgar Morales Pérez, the mayor-elect of a small town in San Luis Potosí, was killed during the raging infighting in Los Zetas.

==== Nuevo Laredo massacre ====
Just after the arrest of the Gulf Cartel leader Jorge Eduardo Costilla Sánchez, 9 bodies were found dead in Nuevo Laredo, Tamaulipas on 15 September 2012, raising the number of homicides by violent acts to 63 in the city in only eight days. A federal source speaking on the condition of anonymity said that a message was left at the scene of the massacre, but the authorities did not disclose its content. Reportedly, Velázquez Caballero had tried to seize the operatives and drug distribution sites of Miguel Treviño Morales in the border city of Nuevo Laredo by attacking his assets.

== Bounty ==
Along with other drug lords, Velázquez Caballero was placed on the list of Mexico's 37 most-wanted drug lords in 2009, with a $30 million pesos reward (US$2.3 million) for information that led to his capture. He was wanted by the Mexican government for organized crime, drug trafficking, and money laundering. In addition to these charges, Velázquez Caballero is responsible for ordering assassinations across the border in Laredo, Texas.

Velázquez Caballero has several aliases, including but not limited to: El Talibán, L-50, and Z-50.

=== Kingpin Act sanction ===
On 24 March 2010, the United States Department of the Treasury sanctioned Velázquez Caballero under the Foreign Narcotics Kingpin Designation Act (sometimes referred to simply as the "Kingpin Act"), for his involvement in drug trafficking along with fifty-three other international criminals and ten foreign entities. The act prohibited U.S. citizens and companies from doing any kind of business activity with him, and virtually froze all his assets in the U.S.

== Arrest ==
The Mexican Navy, with the collaborated intelligence effort of the U.S. Drug Enforcement Administration (DEA), arrested Velázquez Caballero on 26 September 2012 in the Mexican capital city of San Luis Potosí without firing a single bullet. He was arrested with two other men, and the Mexican marines confiscated a couple of cars, 12 kilograms of marijuana, several guns and grenades, and $20,000 in cash. The following day, he was paraded in front of cameras, handcuffed, wearing a bullet-proof vest, and escorted by masked marines carrying assault rifles. Stacks of cash, weapons, and seized narcotics were displayed on a table in front of him, where reporters took pictures of the drug lord. He stood there with a "stern-face" as the Navy accused him of several charges.

According to initial reports issued by the Navy, Velázquez Caballero had controlled the operations of the cartel in the city of Monterrey in northern Mexico and worked as leader of Los Zetas in the states of San Luis Potosí, Zacatecas, Aguascalientes, Guanajuato, and Nuevo León.

During his interrogation, he admitted that his income was around $30 million a month, although 70% of it went to "operation expenses" and as payments for policemen, equipment and food, and members of his organization.

Velázquez Caballero was the third major drug trafficker arrested in September 2012 in Mexico; early that month, Mario Cárdenas Guillén and Jorge Eduardo Costilla Sánchez, two leaders of the Gulf Cartel, were arrested in separate incidents after their two factions were fighting for control.

=== Theoretical aftermaths ===
According to InSight Crime, the timing of Velázquez Caballero's arrest suggests that he was probably set up. One likely informant behind the arrest is Costilla Sánchez, who was arrested two weeks before him and was probably collaborating with the authorities by giving them information. He could have also been betrayed by his own men, who for whatever reason might have decided that they were more willing to line back behind Miguel Treviño Morales.

A clear benefactor for this arrest is Treviño Morales, mainly because Heriberto Lazcano Lazcano does not appear to be taking an active role in the Zeta's struggle for leadership, and has been spending some of his time overseas and in Central America. Nonetheless, Velázquez Caballero's arrest and Lazcano's absence does not signify a clear road for Treviño Morales; so far in 2012, two of his family members − a brother and a nephew − have been arrested. InSight Crime alleges that the arrest will only make Treviño Morales more suspicious of his own commanders and probably herald violence in the future. In addition, Velázquez Caballero's apprehension will probably do very little to stop Los Zetas from breaking apart, and may serve as a foreshadowing for the future of the organization: local and "orphan" Zeta cells will break away from their leaders and start working independently, regardless of their leaders' permission.

Many security experts have theorized that this capture can allow Joaquín "El Chapo" Guzmán of the Sinaloa Cartel to support the Gulf Cartel and gain access to Matamoros, Tamaulipas, a lucrative smuggling route. With the split in Los Zetas, Guzmán Loera may be calculating if his organization is capable of erasing Los Zetas and the Gulf Cartel altogether in order to control larger parts of Tamaulipas. This move may be a "herculean task" for him, but since both the Gulf Cartel and Los Zetas are divided, "he can't complain about the good timing." In addition, if Velázquez Caballero had a number of gunmen under his command, the arrest can mark the beginning of an upsurge in violence, since they arrested the leader and not his subordinates. Nevertheless, it is still unclear how many went with him when he decided to switch alliances and join the Gulf Cartel. It is also unclear how strong and organized the faction is to put up someone to take up the hierarchy. The future for Tamaulipas' criminal underworld is at stake; Velázquez Caballero's arrest may increase the violence in northeastern Mexico, but it can also alleviate if Los Zetas are able to appoint someone to take the lead quickly, or if El Chapo decides to move into Tamaulipas.

== Extradition and conviction ==
Velázquez Caballero was extradited to the United States and made his initial court appearance in Laredo, Texas on the morning of November 22, 2013. On 28 November, he pleaded not guilty to the drug trafficking and money laundering charges. The case was transferred to McAllen, Texas and he appeared before U.S. District Court Judge Micaela Alvarez there on 6 March 2014 for a status hearing. He is expected to re-appear in court in McAllen on 7 April 2014 to either plead guilty for drug trafficking charges or go to trial. If convicted, Velázquez Caballero may face life imprisonment. A large contingency of law enforcement officers from the U.S. Marshals and the McAllen Police Department surveyed the area while the hearing took place. He appeared again in court on 7 April 2014 in McAllen where he pleaded guilty to drug trafficking and money laundering offenses.

He was sentenced to 30 years in prison by a federal judge in Laredo, Texas, on 21 July 2017. He was ordered to forfeit US$10 million in drug proceeds. According to U.S. officials, he is expected to be deported from the U.S. to Mexico after the completion of his sentence.

== Family ==
Mauricio Ramírez Támez, the brother-in-law of Velázquez Caballero, was a cartel boss of the Gulf Cartel but had previously served as a member of Los Zetas. "El Diamante" ('The Diamond'), as he was known, was arrested on 12 October 2012 by the Mexican Navy in Reynosa, Tamaulipas.

== See also ==
- Mexican drug war
- Infighting in the Gulf Cartel
- 2011–2012 in the Mexican Drug War
- List of Mexico's 37 most-wanted drug lords
