= Miguel Treviño Morales =

Mexican drug lord

- Born: Miguel Ángel Treviño Morales; 18 November 1970 (age 55); Nuevo Laredo, Tamaulipas, Mexico
- Other names: L-40; La Mona; El Cuarenta (40, Z-40, Zeta 40); David Estrada-Corado; Comandante Cuarenta; El Mike
- Occupation: Leader of Los Zetas
- Organization: Los Zetas
- Known for: Drug trafficking, murder, money laundering
- Height: 5 ft 8 in (173 cm)
- Predecessor: Heriberto Lazcano
- Successor: Omar Treviño Morales
- Criminal status: Extradited to the United States
- Spouse: Juanita del Carmen Ríos Hernández
- Relatives: Five members: Omar Treviño Morales (brother); José Treviño Morales (brother); Juan Francisco Treviño Chávez (nephew); Juan Francisco Treviño Morales (brother)

Miguel Ángel Treviño Morales (born 18 November 1970), commonly referred to by his alias Z-40, is a Mexican former drug lord and former leader of the criminal organization known as Los Zetas. He was one of Mexico's most-wanted drug lords until his arrest in July 2013.

Born into a family with six brothers and six sisters, Treviño Morales began his criminal career as a teenager, working for Los Texas—a local gang from his hometown of Nuevo Laredo, Tamaulipas. His fluent English and experience of moving contraband along the U.S.–Mexico border enabled him to be recruited in the late 1990s by the drug lord Osiel Cárdenas Guillén, who headed the Gulf Cartel and Los Zetas. Around 2005, he was appointed as the regional boss of the Gulf Cartel including Los Zetas in Nuevo Laredo and was given the task to fight off the forces of the Sinaloa Cartel, which was attempting to take over the lucrative drug trafficking routes to the United States. After successfully securing these routes in Nuevo Laredo in 2006, Treviño Morales was moved to Veracruz and appointed as the Gulf/Zeta leader in the state after the death of the drug lord Efraín Teodoro Torres. Two years later, his boss Heriberto Lazcano Lazcano sent him to Guatemala to wipe out his competitors; after completing the task successfully, he appointed Treviño Morales as the national commander of Los Zetas in 2008. In 2010, Los Zetas gained their independence from the Gulf Cartel, their former allies, and both organizations went to war with each other.

As the national commander of Los Zetas, Treviño Morales earned a notorious reputation for intimidating officials and citizens throughout Mexico. The Mexican authorities believe that he is responsible for a significant part of the violence in Mexico, including the murder of 72 migrants in 2010 and the massacre of 193 people in 2011. A common torture method of his was known as el guiso (stew), in which victims would be dumped into oil barrels, doused with gasoline or diesel fuel, and burned alive. Following the death of his boss Lazcano Lazcano in October 2012, Treviño Morales became his successor and the top leader of Los Zetas drug cartel amid an internal power struggle within the organization.

Mexican Marines arrested Treviño Morales on 15 July 2013 in the state of Nuevo León without a single bullet being fired. At the time of his capture, the Mexican government was offering up to a 30 million pesos (US$2.3 million) reward for information leading to his arrest. However, there is evidence that on December 4, 2012, an individual identified as "Miguel Treviño Morales, AKA Z40" was arrested in Texas. According to the record from the Texas court, the detainee is of "Mexican" nationality and was held at Bastrop County Jail on charges of "Conspiracy to Commit Money Laundering." The United States Department of State was offering, and continue offering, up to US$5 million for information leading to his arrest and conviction. Authorities on both sides of the border believe that he was succeeded by his younger brother Omar Treviño Morales, a man who was also on the most-wanted list. On February 27, 2025, Morales and his brother would be extradited to the United States.

== Early life ==
Miguel Ángel Treviño Morales was born on 18 November 1970 in Nuevo Laredo, Tamaulipas, Mexico. (Note: 18 November 1970 is his official date of birth, but the United States Department of State also includes several "Alternative dates of birth" on Treviño Morales's wanted poster. The dates are 17 July 1980; 25 January 1973; 15 July 1976; 28 June 1973.) His parents, Rodolfo Treviño and María Arcelia Morales, created a large family with six daughters and seven sons, including Miguel. (Note: Miguel Treviño Morales' siblings were Juan Francisco (1955), Arcelia (1957), Irma (1959), Alicia (1961), Rodolfo (1963), María Guadalupe (1964), José (1966), Ana Isabel (1968), Jesús (1970), Óscar Omar (1976), Cristina (1978), and Adolfo (1980).) Like many families along the U.S.-Mexico border, the Treviño family travelled from Mexico to the United States and vice versa, where they bought properties and opened several businesses. His father abandoned his family at a very young age, forcing Treviño Morales to single-handedly raise the whole family. Treviño Morales grew up in a lower-class neighborhood in Nuevo Laredo, but as a teenager, he worked for the wealthy by fixing their yards and washing their cars. He also did chores for the local drug lord Héctor Manuel Sauceda Gamboa (alias El Karis), who later became his mentor; Treviño Morales eventually replaced him as Gulf Cartel leader in Nuevo Laredo. Treviño Morales grew up disliking Mexico's class disparity and developed so much resentment as to partially explain his violent behavior as an adult. Treviño Morales frequented Dallas, Texas with his family. In 1993, he was apprehended in Dallas County and charged with avoiding police arrest, after he had tried to evade the police in a car chase that ended in a street dead end. He paid a $672-dollar fine and was subsequently released from the county prison. Few details are known of Treviño Morales's life in Dallas; the U.S. authorities believe he learned about "power, money, weapons and the vast consumer market for illegal drugs" while living in Texas. They also believe that he perceived an anti-Mexican bias among Americans, and especially towards Mexican immigrants like him. However, Treviño Morales considered Dallas his home because of his large family network that lives in the surrounding areas. According to U.S. investigators, he was last seen in the Dallas area in 2005 after entering the United States illegally, where he visited his family and was said to have been at a strip club.

== Criminal origins and ascension ==
As a teenager, he began to work for Los Tejas, a gang that ran the criminal activities in his hometown of Nuevo Laredo. From washing cars, running errands, and stealing car parts in Nuevo Laredo, Treviño Morales turned to the drug trade, starting with small-scale drug retail sales and smuggling. Unlike the first members of Los Zetas, he was never in the military. He was hired by the Gulf Cartel in the late 1990s for his experience moving contraband across the border. His fluent English and his criminal contacts on both sides of the U.S.-Mexico border allowed him to gain the trust of the then-leader of the Gulf Cartel, Osiel Cárdenas Guillén. When he joined the Gulf Cartel, Los Tejas, the local gang he once worked for, was absorbed by Los Lobos or Grupo L under the leadership of Treviño’s at the time direct boss, El Karis. Around 2005, Treviño Morales became the regional boss of Nuevo Laredo, replacing Sauceda Gamboa; he was in charge of fighting off the incursions of the Sinaloa Cartel, which was attempting to take control of the smuggling routes in the area. The Laredo–Nuevo Laredo area is a lucrative smuggling route for narcotics because of the Interstate 35 highway, which serves as a strategic pathway to San Antonio, Austin, and Dallas for future drug distribution. While in power, he orchestrated a number of assassinations in American cities and in Mexico by young U.S. citizens whom he put on his payroll. Treviño Morales was good at identifying and grooming young teenagers who he believed had the potential to become professional assassins for Los Zetas. These recruits, sometimes called Zetitas ("Little Zetas"), usually joined organized crime as young as twelve-years old to work first as smugglers and later as paid assassins.

By 2006, the Gulf Cartel and Los Zetas managed to defeat the forces of the Sinaloa Cartel in Nuevo Laredo. The latter organization concentrated its efforts in northeastern Mexico, becoming dominant there. Los Zetas started to expand into other criminal activities beyond drug trafficking. Under Treviño Morales, the organization smuggled immigrants to the United States, carried out extortions and kidnappings, sold bootlegged CDs and DVDs, and intimidated and/or killed residents who failed to cooperate with them. Treviño Morales remained in charge of Los Zetas in the state of Nuevo León and in Piedras Negras, Coahuila, until March 2007. He was reassigned to the coastal state of Veracruz, shortly after high-ranking Zetas leader Efraín Teodoro Torres (alias Z-14) was killed in a gun battle at a local horse race. Though Cárdenas Guillén was imprisoned in 2003, he reportedly directed the Gulf Cartel and Los Zetas behind bars; when he was extradited to the United States in 2007, Treviño Morales and Heriberto Lazcano Lazcano pushed for Los Zetas' independence from the Gulf Cartel.

In November 2007, the city of Laredo, Texas, issued an arrest warrant for Treviño in connection with a 2006 double homicide in Texas. In 2008, Treviño Morales and Lazcano Lazcano, the two leaders of Los Zetas, forged an alliance with the Beltrán Leyva Cartel. It had just gone to war with the Sinaloa Cartel, believing that El Chapo Guzmán, their leader, had betrayed them. Treviño Morales subsequently joined them to kill the leader of the Sinaloa Cartel. Government sources said Los Zetas were fighting for control against La Federación (The Federation), an alliance of several drug trafficking groups led by Joaquín El Chapo Guzmán and Ismael El Mayo Zambada, two drug lords who used to work for the Beltrán Leyva Cartel.

In February 2008, Lazcano Lazcano sent Treviño Morales to kill rival drug traffickers and take control of the drug trafficking routes in Guatemala. Reportedly, he carried out a military-like ambush that resulted in the death of the Guatemalan drug lord Juan José León Ardón (alias Juancho) in March. An unnamed U.S. official said that Treviño Morales may have been the man who fired the bullet that killed the drug kingpin. Having succeeded outside of Mexico, Treviño Morales was appointed by Lazcano Lazcano as the national commander of Los Zetas, a position traditionally reserved to Zetas members with military background. In this position, Treviño Morales had a say in nearly all the decisions Los Zetas made at a national level, creating some resentment among the old-generation commanders of Los Zetas who, unlike him, had been in the Mexican Armed Forces before turning to the drug trade.

== Leadership position ==
Treviño Morales acted as a cartel 'gate-keeper,' and his people collected a piso (tariff) at all drug territories controlled by Los Zetas. He controlled the highly lucrative Nuevo Laredo plaza (turf), across the border from Laredo, Texas. He bribed and intimidated officials to help maintain control, and responded to any challenges to his authority or control with brutal violence. Treviño was feared and very few local journalists dared to write about him. He was alleged to have favored a torture method known as el guiso (stew), in which people are stuffed into an oil barrel, doused with gasoline or diesel fuel, and set on fire to burn alive. His violent behavior gained him "the notoriety of a cult figure." He reportedly survived gun battles unharmed, avoided making alliances with anyone, dismembered dozens of victims while they were still alive and dumped them, and "seemed unafraid to die." Organization members claimed that Treviño Morales enjoyed driving around the city in a car, pointing at people randomly and saying, "kill this one and kill that one." A former hitman who worked for him told the press in 2013 that Treviño Morales could not sleep at night if he did not kill someone. He also said that the drug lord would ask his victims how they wanted to be killed. Journalist Alfredo Corchado, head of The Dallas Morning News in Mexico, wrote in one of his books that Treviño Morales enjoyed eating out the hearts of his victims—even when they were still alive—because he believed that doing that would make him invincible among his enemies and authorities.

Treviño Morales reportedly coordinated several violent attacks throughout Mexico, including the murder of 72 migrants in 2010 and the massacre of 193 people a year later in San Fernando, Tamaulipas. He is also believed to have threatened to shoot down the plane of the former President Felipe Calderón in August 2012 while on a trip to the state of Tamaulipas. Although it was not the first time Calderón received death threats from organized crime, the authorities deemed the drug lord's threat as credible, and urged the President to cancel his trip (though he ultimately went anyway). Under Treviño Morales' leadership, Los Zetas were considered by the Drug Enforcement Administration (DEA) to be highly sophisticated, advanced, and one of the most dangerous criminal organizations operating in Mexico and the hemisphere. He was widely regarded as one of the most violent drug lords operating in Mexico.

Treviño Morales reportedly moved around through Mexico and Central America, and often met with Colombian drug lords in Mexico City, the nation's capital, to do business. To escape law enforcement notice, he used "caravans" of purported businessmen and religious persons. In the northern part of the country, he reportedly maintained a close tie with a number of politicians. His brother Omar Treviño Morales (Z-42) leads Los Zetas in the Gulf of Mexico.

== Split between Los Zetas and the Gulf Cartel ==
Cárdenas Guillén was arrested in Matamoros, Tamaulipas, in 2003 and extradited to the United States in 2007. While in prison in Mexico, he reportedly coordinated the Gulf Cartel and Los Zetas from his prison cell. But with his extradition, Treviño Morales's organization experienced a leadership crisis. La Compañía (The Company), a name used to describe the Gulf Cartel and Los Zetas as a conglomerate, remained in a loose cooperation until early 2010, when violence erupted between both groups. On 18 January 2010, several members of the Gulf Cartel kidnapped Víctor Peña Mendoza (alias Concord 3), a leader of Los Zetas and close associate and friend of Treviño Morales. When he was held captive, Peña Mendoza was asked to switch alliances and join the Gulf Cartel, but he refused, earning a beating followed by execution, presumably carried out by Samuel Flores Borrego.

Treviño Morales heard about the incident and issued an ultimatum to Flores Borrego and Gulf Cartel leader Jorge Eduardo Costilla Sánchez:

Hand over the assassin of my friend, you son of a bitch ... You have until the 25th, if you don't comply, there will be war.

Both of the Gulf Cartel leaders ignored the command, and Treviño Morales moved swiftly to avenge the death of his former comrade. On 30 January 2010, Treviño Morales kidnapped and slaughtered 16 Gulf Cartel members in Reynosa, Tamaulipas, marking the start of the cartel war between the Gulf Cartel and Los Zetas in the Mexican states of Tamaulipas, Nuevo León, and Veracruz that has led to thousands of deaths. Los Zetas used violent and intimidatory tactics to expand, forging a reputation as Mexico's most violent drug trafficking organization. It managed to take control of most of the territories owned by the Gulf Cartel when they had essentially served as a single organization. With Treviño Morales as the second-in-command of the criminal organization, Los Zetas began killing Gulf Cartel members and other rival drug traffickers en masse and winning their territories.

== Infighting in Los Zetas ==
In 2011, however, Treviño Morales's criminal organization entered a new internal strife after Jesús Enrique Rejón Aguilar (alias El Mamito), one of their highest-ranking leaders, was arrested in July. Though he did not call out any names, he stated that someone within Los Zetas had betrayed him. Shortly thereafter, alleged organized crime members uploaded a narcocorrido music video on YouTube portraying Treviño Morales "as the New Judas" and accusing him of setting up the arrests and deaths of other commanders within the criminal organization and being disloyal to Lazcano Lazcano, his boss. In several articles published in August 2012, a U.S. law enforcement official told the press that Treviño Morales had successfully taken the leadership of the cartel and displaced Heriberto Lazcano Lazcano, the long-time leader. Treviño Morales began to take over the assets of Los Zetas and was working to remove Lazcano Lazcano as the head since early 2010. Amidst the Zetas civil war, many high-ranking members in Los Zetas began to fall. High-ranking Zetas leader Iván Velázquez Caballero (alias El Talibán) was arrested in September 2012, presumably set up either by rival gang members or gangsters aligned with a group related to Treviño Morales. On 6 October 2012, drug lord Salvador Alfonso Martínez Escobedo (alias La Ardilla) was arrested in Nuevo Laredo by the Mexican Navy. After Velázquez's fall, a split off group known as Los Legionarios (The Legionaries) was born in Nuevo Laredo and vowed to bring down Treviño Morales for allegedly betraying him. A second faction from Los Zetas, known as Sangre Zeta (Zetas Blood), also broke up from the organization to join forces against him.

The active role of Treviño Morales got him the loyalty and respect of many in Los Zetas, and eventually many stopped paying to Lazcano Lazcano. In order to avoid his arrest or death from betrayal, Lazcano Lazcano reportedly fled the country and lived in Germany and Costa Rica for an unknown time with surrounding rumors that he had terminal cancer. (Note: Post-mortem reports indicated that Heriberto Lazcano Lazcano did not suffer from any terminal disease.) Back in Mexico, Treviño Morales had become the stronger of the two in Los Zetas. Lazcano Lazcano was then killed by the Mexican Navy in the state of Coahuila on 7 October 2012, and Treviño Morales succeeded him as the top leader of Los Zetas.

== Bounty and indictments ==
In 2009 in New York and in 2010 in Washington, the U.S. Department of Justice released an indictment against Treviño Morales for conspiracy to manufacture and distribute cocaine into the United States from Mexico and Guatemala. There was a bounty for him in Mexico set at $30 million MXN (US$2.3 million) and another one in the U.S. at US$5 million ($62.4 million MXN). Los Zetas are responsible for the smuggling of multiple tons of cocaine, marijuana, and heroin into the United States from Mexico annually. He was also considered one of Mexico's most-wanted drug lords.

Treviño Morales is known by various aliases: L-40 (40, Z-40, Zeta 40), Comandante Cuarenta, El Cuarenta, David Estrada-Corado, and La Mona.

On October 16, 2024, the United States Ambassador to Mexico, Ken Salazar, announced a new formal indictment in the District of Columbia, adding to the extradition requests made by the United States Department of Justice in 2013 and 2015. Various legal obstacles have prevented the extradition from proceeding. For instance, on September 25, 2014, an opinion was issued regarding criminal case 68/2012 filed in the State of Mexico, Mexico. Based on witness statements and a photographic session held on September 10, 2014, at the Federal Center for Social Rehabilitation No. 2 "Occidente," in Puente Grande, Jalisco, it was concluded that the characteristics mentioned by several witnesses, such as tattoos, body build, and scars, did not match those of the detainee, leading to the conclusion that they were two different individuals. Regarding this issue, on September 17, 2024, during a press conference, Miguel Ángel Treviño Morales's lawyers argued that the detainee of the same name is not the leader of Los Zetas but rather a namesake accused by the then Attorney General's Office of Mexico.

Another document supporting this version is the existence of a record in the Western District Court of Texas documenting the detention of a Mexican named "Miguel Ángel Treviño Morales AKA 40," which took place on December 4, 2012. The Texas court file states that the detainee is of "Mexican" nationality and was held in Bastrop County Jail on charges of "Conspiracy to Launder Monetary Instruments."

In this regard, the defense has the ruling issued in criminal case 02/2008 by the 10th District Court of the State of Tamaulipas and the criminal appeal 24/2019 by the Seventh Unitary Court of the State of Tamaulipas, which acquit Treviño Morales of the crime of organized crime. These documents demonstrate that, according to cooperating witnesses, the detained individual is not the same person known as "Z40" but another person with the same name. These rulings were confirmed in a new decision dated November 30, 2023, in case 295/2023 issued by the Collegiate Appeals Court of the Nineteenth Circuit, which again established that the detainee, named Miguel Treviño Morales, was not the one nicknamed "Z40." To date, the United States Embassy has not responded to these disputes and has instead reinforced its extradition request to President Claudia Sheinbaum Pardo, alleging that Treviño Morales continues to control the Northeast Cartel.

=== Kingpin Act sanction ===
On 20 July 2009, the United States Department of the Treasury sanctioned Treviño Morales under the Foreign Narcotics Kingpin Designation Act (sometimes referred to simply as the "Kingpin Act"), for his involvement in drug trafficking along with three other international criminals. The act prohibited U.S. citizens and companies from doing any kind of business activity with him, and froze virtually all his assets in the U.S.

== Arrest ==
A month before his capture, U.S. authorities had been passing down information to their counterparts in Mexico that Treviño Morales was making frequent visits to the Nuevo Laredo border area to see his newborn baby. They got this intelligence from wiretaps, conversations, and informants' tips. Treviño Morales was apprehended by the Mexican Marines in Anáhuac, Nuevo León, near the border of Tamaulipas state, at around 3:45 a.m. on 15 July 2013 without a single shot fired. The truck he was traveling in was intercepted on the road by a Black Hawk helicopter from the Navy; when the Marines got off the helicopter and tried to apprehend him, the capo attempted to escape by running through some bushes but was later caught. He was in possession of US$2 million ($25,316,100 MXN) in cash, eight weapons, and hundreds of rounds of ammunition; two other men were arrested with him and taken into custody. Rumors of Treviño Morales's arrest and a mugshot of him in custody began to circulate through Twitter and other social media outlets around noon that day, but the Mexican government did not confirm the arrest, nor did the U.S. authorities receive a formal confirmation until hours later.

=== Imprisonment ===
At the time of his arrest, Treviño Morales had pending charges for organized crime involvement, drug trafficking, torture, money laundering, and the illegal use of firearms under Mexican law, among other charges. However, he only declared the money and firearms that were confiscated during his arrest. Following his arrest, the drug lord was flown to Mexico City and kept at the SEIDO installations, Mexico's organized crime investigatory agency. On 19 July 2013, he was transferred to the Federal Social Readaptation Center No. 1 maximum security prison in Almoloya de Juárez, State of Mexico, via helicopter.

In January 2014, a New York federal district court issued other criminal charges against the drug lord. The investigation alleged that Treviño Morales conspired to order killings against rival gangsters of Los Zetas, members of his own criminal organization, and Mexican policemen and personnel of the Mexican Army from September 2004 to July 2013. The court, which sought his extradition, also stated that the drug lord conspired to traffic drugs to the U.S.

On 27 March 2017, Treviño Morales was transferred to a federal prison in Ciudad Juárez, Chihuahua, through a precautionary inmate rotation program. He was then imprisoned in Puente Grande, Jalisco, outside of the city of Guadalajara, until 30 June 2020, whereupon he was transferred to the Federal Center for Social Readaptation (Cefereso) 17, located in Buenavista Tomatlán, in Tierra Caliente, Michoacán.

=== Extradition to the United States ===
On 27 February 2025, Treviño along with 28 other cartel figures were extradited to the United States. His brother Omar would be among those extradited as well.

== Family ==
Miguel's brother José Treviño Morales was arrested on 12 June 2012 by a combined U.S. federal task force. He has been indicted as one of the money launderers for the Zetas through an Oklahoma-based American Quarter Horse racing operation. His nephew Alejandro Treviño Chávez was killed during a shootout in the state of Coahuila on 5 October 2012 by a law enforcement group; in response, Miguel ordered the murder of José Eduardo Moreira, nephew of governor of Coahuila Rubén Moreira, and son of Humberto Moreira (Governor of the State of Coahuila from 2005 to 2011).

His younger brother is Omar Treviño Morales, who is said to have replaced Miguel's leadership role in Los Zetas. At around 4:00 a.m. on 4 March 2015, Treviño Morales was captured inside a residence in Fuentes del Valle, an upper-class neighborhood in San Pedro Garza García, Nuevo León, by the Federal Police and the Mexican Army. Not a single shot was fired in the operation. In a nearby neighborhood, authorities arrested his financial operator Carlos Arturo Jiménez Encinas, along with four other people. Four days later he was transferred to the Federal Social Readaptation Center No. 1, a maximum-security prison in Almoloya de Juárez, State of Mexico. He was formally charged in a federal court in Toluca, State of Mexico on 13 March for money laundering and for violating Mexico's Federal Law of Firearms and Explosives.

Miguel's older brother, Juan Francisco Treviño Morales, is currently imprisoned in the United States; his son (and nephew of Miguel), Juan Francisco Treviño Chávez, alias El Quico, was arrested in Monterrey on 15 June 2012. Eduardo Treviño Treviño, another nephew of Miguel, was arrested in Nuevo Laredo in May 2013 and awaits an extradition to the United States for kidnapping and drug trafficking charges that date back to 2010. Miguel's wife Juanita del Carmen Ríos Hernández was included in the Foreign Narcotics Kingpin Designation Act in February 2014, banning U.S. citizens from doing any kind of business activities with companies under her name.

== Bibliography ==
- Bunker, R.J. (2006). Networks, Terrorism and Global Insurgency. Taylor & Francis. ISBN 0-415-38594-6.
- Grayson, George (2012). The Executioner's Men: Los Zetas, Rogue Soldiers, Criminal Entrepreneurs, and the Shadow State They Created. Transaction Publishers. ISBN 978-1-4128-4617-2.
- Hernández, Anabel (2010). Los señores del narco. Random House. ISBN 978-607-31-0104-2.
- Robinson, Jeffrey (2011). The Takedown: A Suburban Mom, A Coal Miner's Son, and The Unlikely Demise of Colombia's Brutal Norte Valle Cartel. Macmillan Publishers. ISBN 978-0-312-61238-2.
