= Zetas Vieja Escuela =

Mexican drug cartel

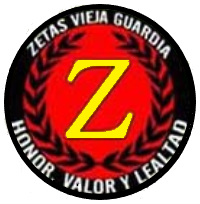
- Founded: 2016
- Founded by: José Guizar Valencia; Antonio Salas Perea
- Founding location: Ciudad Victoria, Tamaulipas
- Years active: 2016−present
- Territory: Coahuila, Nuevo León, Tamaulipas, San Luis Potosí, Quintana Roo, Veracruz and Zacatecas
- Ethnicity: Mexican
- Membership: ~3,000
- Criminal activities: Drug trafficking, extortion, kidnapping, murder, oil theft
- Allies: Gulf Cartel; CJNG
- Rivals: Mexico; Northeast Cartel; Sinaloa Cartel

The Zetas Vieja Escuela (English: Old School Zetas) is a Mexican criminal organization that splintered from Los Zetas. It was founded by José Guizar Valencia, alias "Z-43", along with other dissidents of the original organization. The group took the name Vieja Escuela, arguing that they would continue the "original business" of drug trafficking, including the same brutality.

== History ==
The Zetas Vieja Escuela is a splinter group of Los Zetas that had been operating since 1997 in the northern and northeastern states of the country. Los Zetas originated from the special forces of the Mexican Army that were launched against the Zapatista uprising. However, these forces were not used at the time, and instead were sent to northern Mexico to carry out anti-narco operations. After splitting off, the Zetas Vieja Escuela began with a base in northern Veracruz and have since split. gradually extended through much of the center and east of the country, with a presence in Coahuila, Nuevo León, Tamaulipas (especially the municipalities of Río Bravo, Valle Hermoso and San Fernando), San Luis Potosí, Quintana Roo and Zacatecas.

== Attacks and incidents ==
In March 2019, members of the Jalisco New Generation Cartel executed a member of the Zetas Vieja Escuela, possibly in the state of Veracruz. On April 2, members of the ZVE shot dead three people (one woman and two men) alleged members of the CJNG, abandoning them in the center of the municipality of José Azueta, in southern Veracruz.

== Arrests and deaths of ZVE members ==
On 17 November 2017, Martiniano de Jesús Jaramillo Silva, nicknamed "El Pata de Queso" or "Z-74", died due to a kidney complication, hours after being arrested by the Federal Police. "Z-74" was pointed out as one of the direct perpetrators of the 2010 San Fernando massacre.

On 9 February 2018, Mexican authorities arrested the new leader José María Guízar Valencia alias "Z-43" in Mexico City in Roma neighbourhood. The United States government offered $5m reward for his capture, he is responsible for importing thousands of kilograms of cocaine and methamphetamine to the US every year and murdered an untold number of Guatemalan civilians during the systematic takeover of the Guatemalan border region.

Several months later on 20 November, Luis Reyes Enríquez, alias "El Rex" or called "Z-12" is assassinated in a Nuevo Laredo prison. The former criminal leader was found with multiple injuries caused by a stabbing weapon in his cell. The former criminal leader has been imprisoned since 2015 in the Miahuatlán de Porfirio Díaz federal prison, Oaxaca, where he served his sentence, but when he was released, he was rearrested and transferred to Tamaulipas, where he was charged with homicide. On 27 November, his body was taken from the Valdez funeral home, and parts of his body was scattered outside the Topo Chico, Apodaca and Cadereyta prisons.

On 9 April 2019, José Roberto Stolberg Becerra, also known as "La Barbie", was arrested in Jalisco. He was reported to have been the leader of Zetas Vieja Escuela.

== See also ==
- Sangre Nueva Zeta
- List of Mexican cartels
