= Héctor David Delgado Santiago =

Mexican drug trafficker (1975–2013)

- Héctor David Delgado Santiago holding a G3 rifle
- Born: 23 December 1975; Matamoros, Tamaulipas, Mexico
- Died: 15 January 2013 (aged 37); Reynosa, Tamaulipas, Mexico
- Other names: M4; El Metro 4
- Occupation: Gulf Cartel leader
- Predecessor: Samuel Flores Borrego
- Opponent: Los Zetas
- Parent(s): Armando Delgado and María Elvia Salgado

Héctor David Delgado Santiago (23 December 1975 – 15 January 2013), commonly referred to by his alias El Metro 4, was a suspected Mexican drug lord and high-ranking leader of the Gulf Cartel, a criminal group based in Tamaulipas. Born and raised in Matamoros, Tamaulipas, El Metro 4 initiated his criminal career by working with Los Metros, an enforcer gang of the Gulf Cartel.

After several years, his position in the cartel grew, and he later became the regional leader in Reynosa, Tamaulipas and the right-hand man of the drug lord Mario Ramírez Treviño. Although no official reports have been released, several media outlets alleged that El Metro 4 was found dead in Reynosa on 15 January 2013. The motives behind his murder are still unknown, but the two prevailing theories suggest that he was killed by the rival gang Los Zetas or betrayed by members of his own cartel.

== Criminal career ==
Héctor David Delgado Santiago was born and raised in the Mexican border city of Matamoros, Tamaulipas on 23 December 1975. (Note: His exact date of birth is not in the given citation, but he was born somewhere in the mid to late 1970s because he died in his late 30s. In addition, other sources refer to El Metro 4 as David Salgado and not as Héctor Delgado Santiago.) His father was a former customs broker in the area. He started his criminal career as a gang member for Los Metros, a muscle group of the drug trafficking organization known as the Gulf Cartel. As time passed, El Metro 4 became acquainted with some corrupt Mexican law enforcement officials, and his rank in the Gulf Cartel grew.

Delgado Santiago, unlike other drug traffickers of his time like Gregorio Sauceda-Gamboa (Metro 2) and Samuel Flores Borrego (Metro 3), managed to keep a low-profile by working alongside corrupt law enforcement and staying out of the Mexican and U.S. authorities' radar. At some point in his career, El Metro 4 worked as the regional boss of the Gulf Cartel in Reynosa, Tamaulipas and as the right-hand man of the current leader Mario Ramírez Treviño.

Between September and October 2012, El Metro 4 was riding a battered old car (to avoid detection by the military) while heading to Río Bravo, Tamaulipas when he was pulled over by the transit police. The police tried to extort him, and did not believe he was a Gulf Cartel leader. "Feeling offended, he punished them all..." and forced all of the transit police in the area to do patrolling on foot for approximately six weeks for pulling him over.

El Metro 4 was known by authorities on both sides of the border as a coldblooded and ruthless assassin. In 2011, the Texas Department of Public Safety indicated that he had given orders to his henchmen to fire at U.S. agents if they interfered with drug shipments of the cartel. There were also several attacks carried out in the United States that were attributed to El Metro 4, who had a reputation of disregarding "borders when scores needed to be settled."

=== Cartel infighting ===
On 2 September 2011, the bullet-ridden body of Samuel Flores Borrego was found in the outskirts of Reynosa. Preliminary reports suggested, however, that he was abducted, tortured, and executed by members of his own cartel. With his death, the Gulf Cartel separated into two factions: one faction was known as Los Rojos, which was originally composed by members loyal to the family of the imprisoned leader Osiel Cárdenas Guillén; the second faction was called Los Metros, and was headed by the former leader Jorge Eduardo Costilla Sánchez. In an effort to find those responsible, El Metro 4 worked with Osiel's nephew Rafael Cárdenas Vela (El Junior) and decided that they were going to lead an investigation inside the Gulf Cartel.

=== Disappearance and death ===
Although there is not an official statement from the U.S. and Mexican authorities, several media outlets that cited "extra-official sources" alleged that El Metro 4 was killed in Reynosa, Tamaulipas on early hours of the morning on 15 January 2013. Initial reports indicated that he was wounded in a shootout and was taken to a local hospital, where he later died of complications from the gunshot wounds he received.

It was later indicated, however, that the man who died in the hospital was another top criminal in the Gulf Cartel, and that El Metro 4 had actually disappeared a few days before and that his body was found dead by the Mexican authorities in Reynosa.

There are two different versions surrounding the motives behind El Metro 4's death: (1) one of them is that he was killed by rival gang members of Los Zetas, who managed to make an incursion in Reynosa; (2) the other version is that he was betrayed and killed by members of his own cartel. InSight Crime believes that if Los Zetas were responsible for his death, the attack was probably a direct response to the Gulf Cartel incursions in Monterrey in 2012. In addition, Reynosa is typically regarded as a stronghold of the Gulf Cartel, but it has not been immune to incursions by Los Zetas. If El Metro 4 was betrayed, it remains unclear for whom the assassins were working, whether or not some Gulf Cartel members shifted to Los Zetas, or if it was an internal strife. (Note: Borderland Beat alleges that El Metro 4 was killed by members of his own enforcer gang Los Metros. There are no official reports on the incident, however.)

Aftermath

On the night of 10 March 2013, a three-hour gun battle broke out between alleged rival factions of the Gulf Cartel in the streets of Reynosa, Tamaulipas. Government reports suggest that two innocent civilians were killed in the crossfire, but a law enforcement official with direct knowledge of the incident indicated that at least 36 people were killed; the number may even be higher, considering that Gulf Cartel gunmen managed to pick up the bodies of their fallen soldiers. Large armed convoys of over a dozen vehicles with the signs "M4" were seen throughout the city.

According to Valor por Tamaulipas, the shootout was caused by a power struggle within the Gulf Cartel, which skyrocketed with the death of El Metro 4. Borderland Beat indicated that Los Metros gang of the Gulf Cartel experienced several disputes with Miguel El Gringo Villarreal and El Commandante Puma, leaders of another group within the cartel. Although no official reports exists, there are rumors that El Commandante Puma were killed in the gunfight.

== See also ==
- List of people who disappeared mysteriously: post-1990
- List of unsolved murders (2000–present)
- Mexican drug war
