= Gilberto Barragán Balderas =

Mexican drug lord

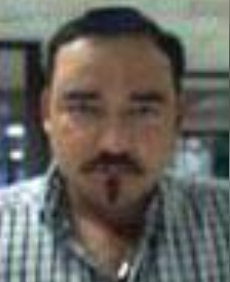
- Born: Gilberto Barragán Balderas; 19 May 1970 (age 55); Miguel Alemán, Tamaulipas, Mexico
- Other names: Heriberto; Tocayo; Metro 18
- Employer: Gulf Cartel (suspected)
- Criminal charge: Drug trafficking
- Criminal status: Arrested

Notes
- Extradited in 2020 to face trial in the U.S. District Court for the District of Columbia

Gilberto Barragán Balderas (born 19 May 1970) is a Mexican suspected drug lord and high-ranking member of the Gulf Cartel, a criminal group based in Tamaulipas, Mexico. He joined the cartel in the late 1990s and was a trusted enforcer of kingpin Jorge Eduardo Costilla Sánchez. Barragán Balderas was the regional boss of Miguel Alemán and helped coordinate international drug trafficking shipments from South and Central America to Mexico and the U.S. His role in the cartel also included providing them with information on the movement and location of Mexican security forces to ensure safe passage of their cocaine and marijuana shipments. In 2008, an indictment issued by the U.S. District Court for the District of Columbia detailing his criminal activities was unsealed in court.

In 2009, the U.S. Department of State and the Drug Enforcement Administration (DEA) issued a US$5 million bounty for information leading to his arrest and/or conviction. In 2010, the U.S. Department of the Treasury sanctioned Barragán Balderas under the Kingpin Act. Barragán Balderas was arrested by the Mexican Federal Police at a ranch in Reynosa in 2011 while he celebrated his birthday. He was imprisoned at the Federal Social Readaptation Center No. 1, a maximum-security prison in the State of Mexico. In 2020, he was extradited to the U.S. for his outstanding drug trafficking charges.

== Early life and background ==
Gilberto Barragán Balderas was born in Miguel Alemán, Tamaulipas, Mexico, on 19 May 1970. He is related to Manuel Balderas Ramírez, who served as the mayor of Miguel Alemán Municipality from 1990 to 1992. According to information from the Secretariat of Public Security (SSP), Barragán Balderas joined the Gulf Cartel, a criminal group based in Tamaulipas, Mexico, in the late 1990s when former kingpin Osiel Cárdenas Guillén became its leader. In the cartel he was the regional boss of Miguel Alemán, which is across the U.S.-Mexico border from Roma, Texas, located in an area known as La Frontera Chica. He coordinated international drug trafficking shipments for the cartel from there. He was a close collaborator of former kingpin Jorge Eduardo Costilla Sánchez. In the Gulf Cartel, he worked under a faction known as Los Metros. His code name was "Metro 18" ("M-18"). Like Barragán Balderas, Los Metros were loyalist to Costilla Sánchez.

According to his U.S. Department of State (DOS) criminal profile, Barragán Balderas goes by his aliases "Heriberto" and "Tocayo", is 5 ft 10 in (1.78 m) tall and weighs 200 lb (91 kg). He has black hair and brown-colored eyes. The DOS's Narcotics Rewards Program is offering up to US$5 million for information that leads to his arrest and/or conviction. In conjunction with the DOS, the U.S. Drug Enforcement Administration (DEA) listed him among the top ten most-wanted Gulf Cartel and Los Zetas members in 2009. This list was made up with information compiled from the DEA's Dallas jurisdiction. The total reward for Barragán Balderas and his collaborators was up to US$50 million. He was later moved to the most-wanted fugitives list of the DEA's Houston jurisdiction.

== Career and indictments ==
According to a sealed indictment sworn in by a grand jury of the U.S. District Court for the District of Columbia (D.D.C.) on 15 November 2007, on or around June 2006, Barragán Balderas and other members of the Gulf Cartel and Los Zetas conspired with intent to distribute at least 5 kg (11 lb) of cocaine and 1,000 kg (2,200 lb) of marijuana from Mexico, Colombia and elsewhere into the U.S. In addition, the D.D.C. stated that in November 2007, Barragán Balderas was charged with conspiring with intent to distribute at least 5 kg (11 lb) of cocaine. For these two counts, Barragán Balderas was ordered to forfeit all money and properties derived from the sale of these drugs, as well as any properties used to facilitate his operations. If such properties could not be located, were sold or transferred to a third-party, and/or largely diminished in value, Barragán Balderas was ordered to forfeit other assets to make up for the total amount of said property. This indictment was unsealed in court on 12 March 2008.

In a superseding indictment issued by the D.D.C. on 15 May 2009, Barragán Balderas was charged with more international drug charges. The prosecution also added more details of his criminal activities. Concerning the cocaine trafficking charges against him in the previous indictment, the prosecution specified that the cocaine shipments came from Colombia, Guatemala, Panama, Mexico and elsewhere before they reached the U.S. They also stated that he was responsible for coordinating cash smuggling activities from the U.S. to Mexico, and referred to his criminal organization as La Compañía (English: The Company), a name that collectively referred to the co-organization of the Gulf Cartel and its former paramilitary group, Los Zetas. They also charged him with providing his criminal group with information on law enforcement operations directed against them. The information included the movement and checkpoints erected by the Mexican Armed Forces, the Federal Police (PF) and the Tamaulipas State Police to prevent disruption of their marijuana and cocaine shipments.

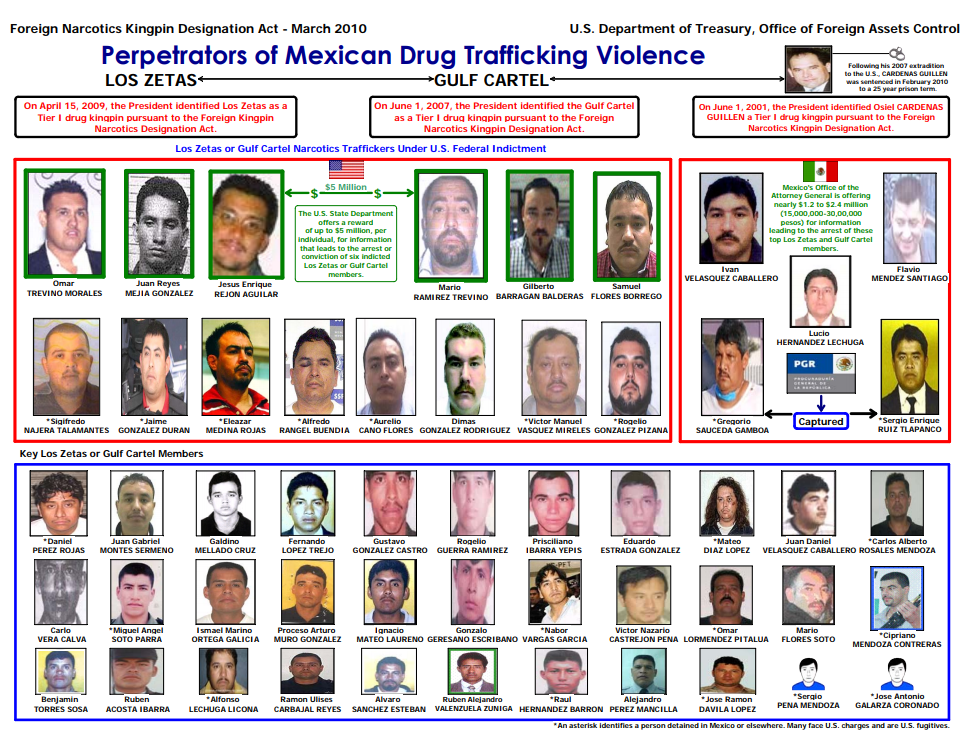
Gilberto Barragán Balderas pictured within the leadership chart of the Gulf Cartel and Los Zetas

The indictment also detailed that on or around 30 November 2007 in Colón, Panama, Barragán Balderas along with Costilla Sánchez, Mario Ramírez Treviño, Samuel Flores Borrego and other members of La Compañía shipped approximately 2,400 kg (5,300 lb) of cocaine with the intent of distributing it in the U.S. In a phone conversation on or around 8 December 2007, Barragán Balderas and Flores Borrego discussed the seizure of the shipment in Panama. They talked about who was responsible for the seizure and how the merchandise was to be recovered. In a phone conversation on or around 18 February 2008, Barragán Balderas and Flores Borrego discussed two cocaine deals. In their first conversation, they discussed a 15 kg (33 lb) cocaine shipment. In their second conversation, they talked about the distribution of 50 kg (110 lb) of cocaine from McAllen, Texas, to Tennessee. According to the indictment, Barragán Balderas expected a payout of US$23,000 for each kilogram sold. About a month later, on 4 March 2008, Barragán Balderas and Flores Borrego discussed a marijuana handover of 5,000 kg (11,000 lb) intended for four suspects. 1,000 kg (2,200 lb) of marijuana were given to Jaime González Durán, another high-ranking member of La Compañía. Barragán Balderas and Flores Borrego discussed storing the marijuana with Juan Reyes Mejia-González and other unnamed suspects. The U.S. government again ordered Barragán Balderas to forfeit his earnings from these drug transactions or forfeit other assets to make up the total value.

In a D.D.C. superseding indictment sworn in by a grand jury on 7 May 2012 and unsealed in court on 9 May 2013, U.S. authorities detailed more information on his drug trafficking activities. They stated that in or around 2000 and up to February 2010, Barragán Balderas and other of his colleagues manufactured and intended to distribute 5 kg (11 lb) or more of cocaine from Colombia, Guatemala, Panama, Mexico and elsewhere into the U.S. They also charged him with intending to distribute 1,000 kg (2,200 lb) of marijuana from Mexico to the U.S. The U.S. government again ordered Barragán Balderas to forfeit his drug proceeds or other assets equivalent to the total value he made from these drug deals.

According to the former PF chief Ramón Eduardo Pequeño García, Barragán Balderas was responsible for commanding Gulf Cartel cells in Tamaulipas to fight off rival cells from Los Zetas (though previously together, both groups broke ties in 2010). On 6 February 2011, Barragán Balderas's henchmen reportedly mutilated five alleged Zetas' members bodies and dumped them beside a highway in Los Ramones. They were piled together on public display. The victims were tortured before being killed (as shown by their visible torture wounds and duct tape covering their eyes). They were then beheaded and mutilated; their torsos, arms and legs were chopped off. Their assassins left a banner reportedly signed by Barragán Balderas. In its message, Barragán Balderas taunted Los Zetas leader Jesús Enrique Rejón Aguilar's ("El Mamito") attempt to send his forces to the Gulf Cartel's turf. "Keep on sending more idiots like these," the banner read.

=== Economic sanctions ===
On 24 March 2010, the Office of Foreign Assets Control (OFAC), a branch of the United States Department of the Treasury, sanctioned 54 high-ranking members of the Gulf Cartel and Los Zetas, including Barragán Balderas, under the Foreign Narcotics Kingpin Designation Act (Kingpin Act). This sanction was made after U.S. and Mexican officials met in Mexico City the day before as part of the Mérida Initiative. It also included the support of the U.S. Drug Enforcement Administration (DEA) and their special operations team, which assisted the OFAC in identifying the designated suspects. The list of designated suspects included drug traffickers, money launders, hitmen, and enforcers. Several of them controlled drug trafficking operations in Tamaulipas, Nuevo León, and other parts of Mexico, and had previous drug charges in the U.S.

As part of the sanction, the U.S. government prohibited U.S. citizens from engaging in business activities with Barragán Balderas and froze all of his U.S.-based assets; this was done to reduce his financial support to the Gulf Cartel and Los Zetas and prevent him from having access to the international financial sector. Corporate officers could face up to US$5 million in fines and up to 30 years in prison for violations of these provisions.

== Arrest ==
On 20 May 2011, the PF arrested Barragán Balderas while he celebrated his birthday at a ranch on the outskirts of Reynosa, alongside a highway that led to Miguel Alemán. Authorities were tipped off that he was planning to attend a birthday party along with other high-ranking cartel members. When they confirmed his location, they proceeded to the place to apprehend him. No shots were fired during this operation. He was arrested with two of his accomplices—Romeo Eduardo Mejía González and Sergio Gutiérrez Castañón. (Note: Romeo Eduardo Mejía González is the brother of Juan Reyes Mejía González, another high-ranking Gulf Cartel member.) At the scene, security forces seized a Chevrolet vehicle with U.S. license plates, an AR-15 rifle with two supplied magazines, and a .357 Glock pistol and two .9 mm handguns with supplied magazines. Reynosa residents reported on Twitter that there was gunfire and heavy law enforcement presence in neighborhoods southwest of the city. The PF presented Barragán Balderas to the media at their offices in Mexico City, and explained the charges and investigations he faced to national press.

The PF confirmed that the detainees were handed over to the Subprocuraduría de Investigación Especializada en Delincuencia Organizada (SIEDO), Mexico's organized crime investigation agency. He gave his legal declaration at the SIEDO offices on the day of his arrest. Authorities confirmed that the SIEDO had 48 hours to determine his legal status, though they could request more time to gather more evidence against him. On 26 May, a federal penal judge ordered Barragán Balderas to remain under SIEDO custody for 40 days. This was granted after the SIEDO presented evidence to the judge that Barragán Balderas was wanted for his suspected participation in drug trafficking (including drug possession), organized crime involvement and illegal possession of military-exclusive firearms. The SIEDO continued to gather more evidence against him. He was kept at the Federal Investigation Center (CIF) of the Attorney General's Office (PGR) in Colonia Doctores during this 40-day period.

On 14 July 2011, Barragán Balderas was transferred to the Federal Social Readaptation Center No. 1 ("Altiplano"), a maximum-security prison in the State of Mexico, after a judge issued an arrest warrant for his formal transfer to a penitentiary. The judge considered the charges he faced were sufficient to order his imprisonment. Federal authorities confirmed that Barragán Balderas's accomplices were also sent to Altiplano.

== Extradition ==
On 13 January 2020, Barragán Balderas was extradited from Mexico to the U.S. along with seven other suspected drug traffickers from the Gulf Cartel, Los Zetas and the Juárez Cartel to face his outstanding drug trafficking charges. At the time of his extradition, per Article 12 of the National Code of Criminal Procedures (CNPP), he was considered innocent until proven guilty through due process.

== See also ==
- Mexican drug war

== Bibliography ==
- Grayson, George W. (2012). The Executioner's Men: Los Zetas, Rogue Soldiers, Criminal Entrepreneurs, and the Shadow State They Created (1st ed.). Transaction Publishers. ISBN 9781412846172.
- Hearn, Patrick H. (2007). "United States of America v. Gilberto Barragan-Balderas" (PDF). United States District Court for the District of Columbia.
- O'Brien, Paul M.; Hearn, Patrick; Gillies, John M. (2009). "Superseding Indictment: United States of America v. Gilberto Barragan-Balderas" (PDF). United States District Court for the District of Columbia. Archived from the original (PDF) on 5 December 2020.
- Wyatt, Arthur G.; Torriente, Sean (2012). "Superseding Indictment: United States of America v. Gilberto Barragan-Balderas". United States District Court for the District of Columbia.
