= Mario Ramírez Treviño =

Mexican drug trafficker (1962–2025)

- Born: Mario Armando Ramírez Treviño; 5 March 1962; Mexico
- Died: 13 March 2025 (aged 63)
- Other names: X-20; Pelón (Baldy); Mario Pelón (Mario the Baldy); Comandante X-20 (Commander X-20)
- Occupation: Gulf Cartel leader
- Employer: Tamaulipas State Police
- Known for: Drug trafficking
- Predecessor: Samuel Flores Borrego; Jorge Eduardo Costilla Sánchez
- Successor: Homero Cárdenas Guillén

Mario Armando Ramírez Treviño (5 March 1962 – 13 March 2025), commonly referred to by his aliases El Pelón and/or X-20, was a Mexican suspected drug lord and leader of the Gulf Cartel, a drug trafficking organization.

In the early 2000s, Ramírez Treviño was a close associate of Jaime González Durán (El Hummer), a founder and top leader of Los Zetas drug cartel. In 2008, González Durán was arrested and sentenced to 35 years in prison; by 2010, Los Zetas, who were working as the armed wing of the Gulf Cartel, separated from the organization to operate independently. Both criminal organizations went to war with each other, but Ramírez Treviño remained in the Gulf Cartel. Under the tutelage of Samuel Flores Borrego (El Metro 3), he worked as the second-in-command for the criminal organization in Reynosa, Tamaulipas. In an apparent power struggle within the Gulf Cartel, however, El Metro 3 was killed, and he became the regional kingpin in September 2011.

With the death of El Metro 3, several groups within the Gulf Cartel went to war with each other, but Ramírez Treviño remained loyal to his faction, Los Metros. In late 2012, the Gulf Cartel leaders Mario Cárdenas Guillén and Jorge Eduardo Costilla Sánchez were arrested by the Mexican Armed Forces, forcing him to take the lead of the criminal organization. To keep the Gulf Cartel under his control and in a single command structure, Ramírez Treviño resorted to kill El Metro 4, Miguel "El Gringo" Villarreal, and other cartel leaders who stood in his way. He was arrested by the Mexican Army and Navy on 17 August 2013 in Reynosa. On 18 December 2017 Ramírez Treviño was extradited to the United States.

== Early life and career ==
Mario Armando Ramírez Treviño was born in Mexico on 5 March 1962. For many years, he worked under the radar as he ascended in the ranks of the Gulf Cartel. In the early 2000s, he worked with Jaime González Durán (El Hummer), one of the leaders and founders of Los Zetas, an organization that served as the armed wing of the Gulf Cartel. El Hummer was eventually arrested in November 2008 and sentenced to 35 years in prison; Los Zetas later separated from the Gulf Cartel in early 2010 and went to war with them. But when the two organizations separated, Ramírez Treviño remained loyal to the Gulf Cartel and became the second-in-command in Reynosa, Tamaulipas, an area formerly controlled by the deceased Samuel Flores Borrego (El Metro 3). He was Flores Borrego's right-hand man in Reynosa. On 2 September 2011, however, the Mexican authorities discovered the bullet-ridden corpse of Flores Borrego inside a Ford Lobo truck on a highway that connects Reynosa with Monterrey. Although the information has not been confirmed, the Mexican Army alleges that Ramírez Treviño's boss was killed by "members of his own cartel," presumably on orders from the Gulf Cartel leaders Juan Mejía González (El R-1) and Rafael Cárdenas Vela (El Junior). Within a few hours after his death, Ramírez Treviño, who had been working as the regional boss of Ciudad Victoria, Tamaulipas, succeeded him as the kingpin of Reynosa. The top echelons of the Gulf Cartel gave him "explicit orders to make the [drug market] profitable again."

The death of Ramírez Treviño's boss triggered a war within the Gulf Cartel, resulting in the deaths and arrests of several high-ranking drug traffickers from 2011 to 2013. When the Gulf Cartel's top leaders Mario Cárdenas Guillén and Jorge Eduardo Costilla Sánchez were arrested in early September 2012, Ramírez Treviño decided to step up for the job and become the undisputed leader of the cartel. In efforts to keep the Gulf Cartel under a single command structure, he ordered the assassination of high-ranking drug trafficker El Metro 4 on 15 January 2013 in Reynosa. His death, however, sparked a turf war.

== Reynosa turf wars ==
=== Battle with Miguel "El Gringo" Villarreal ===
On the night of 10 March 2013, rival factions within the Gulf Cartel clashed when gunmen loyal to Ramírez Treviño and henchmen of Miguel "El Gringo" Villarreal, another high-ranking drug trafficker, battled in a three-hour gunfight in Reynosa, paralyzing the avenues and streets of the city while the Mexican Armed Forces missed most of the fighting. When the melee ended, the Mexican government initially confirmed two civilian deaths, but unofficial reports suggested that around 40 Gulf Cartel gunmen were reportedly killed; the number may possibly be higher, considering that the cartel members were reported to have carried away the corpse of their fallen comrades in their vehicles. (Note: According to the authorities of Tamaulipas, only two bystanders were killed that day, a taxi driver and a boy. The Monitor newspaper reported at least three dozen bodies (36 people), while other outlets talked of over 50. One anonymous officier in Reynosa indicated that investigators managed to recover only two bodies. He believes that if there were more casualties, "... their bodies had been removed by the time he arrived.") In the shootout, unofficial reports claimed that El Gringo's ally, Jesús García Román (El Puma), was killed. And that high-ranking Gulf Cartel leader Sergio Ortegón Silva (Comandante Cortez), who heads the faction known as Los Ceros (The Zeros), confronted El Gringo and his forces. (Note: Los Ceros is a group within the Gulf Cartel that allegedly served as the private army of Samuel Flores Borrego, a deceased drug trafficker.)

Ramírez Treviño and El Gringo vied for the control of the drug trade operations in Reynosa, but the former had taken the overall command of the Gulf Cartel and had committed himself to kill anyone that he considered his enemy, which included El Gringo. In order to put him down, Ramírez Treviño ordered his men to "erase everything and [kill] everyone that had ties El Gringo", thereby creating a single structure among the cartel's commanders. With the help of the Sinaloa Cartel, Ramírez Treviño was planning to oust El Gringo for reportedly failing to stay low-profile in Reynosa, and for considering him a "bloodthirsty" leader. In addition, he distrusted El Gringo because he had ties with his rival Juan Mejía González (El R1). Stratfor indicates that the infighting between both men might have triggered after El Gringo allegedly betrayed the Gulf Cartel and started working with Heriberto Lazcano Lazcano (El Lazca), the deceased leader of the rival Los Zetas cartel. Intelligence reports indicate that the infighting between Ramírez Treviño and El Gringo left at least 60 dead throughout the state of Tamaulipas in March 2013, particularly in Miguel Alemán and Camargo, Tamaulipas.

After several prolonged battles for the control of Reynosa, Ramírez Treviño became the top leader of the Gulf Cartel in 2013, a position he had been vying since the drug lords Costilla Sánchez and Cárdenas Guillén were arrested in late 2012. Although the information has not been officially confirmed, Stratfor intelligence agency suggests that El Gringo and several of his top associates were killed in the infighting on 10 March 2013.

== Bounty and status ==
According to the United States Department of State, Ramírez Treviño is 1.73 m (5 ft 8 in) tall, and weighs approximately 90.1 kilograms (200 lbs). He has black-colored hair and brown eyes, and his aliases are X-20, Comandante X-20 ("Commander X-20"), Pelón ("Baldy"), and/or Mario Pelón.

Ramírez Treviño was an active participant and coordinator of cocaine and marijuana shipments heading to the United States from Mexico. He is also involved in moving large sums of money from drug sales heading back to Mexico from the U.S. through the Reynosa corridor. He was also the leader of Los Metros, a Gulf Cartel subgroup. In 2008, he was charged with a federal indictment in the District of Columbia for violations of Title 21 USC Sections 959, 960, 963, and Title 18 USC Section 2. The United States Department of State was offering up to US$5 million for information leading to his arrest and/or conviction. Mexico, however, did not have him on its most-wanted list and was not offering any financial reward for information leading to his arrest.

His criminal profile portrays Ramírez Treviño as a violent, cold-blooded, and intelligent criminal. Assassins who have worked for him say that the drug lord enjoyed spending time alone, gambling, and drinking; they also say that he was an introvert and was easily frustrated. To instill fear among his enemies and respect among his men, Ramírez Treviño reportedly tortured his victims. He was considered "at least as violent" as former Zetas leader Miguel Treviño Morales.

=== Kingpin Act sanction ===
On 24 March 2010, the United States Department of the Treasury sanctioned Ramírez Treviño under the Foreign Narcotics Kingpin Designation Act (sometimes referred to simply as the "Kingpin Act"), for his involvement in drug trafficking along with fifty-three other international criminals and ten foreign entities. The act prohibited U.S. citizens and companies from doing any kind of business activity with him, and virtually froze all his assets in the U.S.

== Months prior to arrest ==
After Los Zetas leader Miguel Treviño Morales (alias Z40) was arrested in July 2013, the authorities speculated that Ramírez Treviño was planning to lead the Gulf Cartel into new grounds by retaking the turfs controlled by Los Zetas, their former allies, in northeastern Mexico. With a new armed squad known as Los Deltas (a parallel version of what Los Zetas was for the Gulf Cartel prior to their separation), the drug lord was planning to fight off Los Zetas at a border area known as "La Frontera Chica," which encompasses Miguel Alemán, Camargo and Ciudad Mier – directly across the U.S-Mexico border from Starr County, Texas. Other crime specialists believed that Ramírez Treviño stood a chance of reunifying the Gulf Cartel and Los Zetas as they were in early 2010.

=== Capture ===
Ramírez Treviño was arrested during a joint operation between the Mexican Army and Navy in Reynosa, Tamaulipas, on the morning of 17 August 2013. (Note: Preliminary reports indicated that Ramírez Treviño was arrested at his home in Río Bravo, Tamaulipas.) In the operative the federal agents confiscated three assault rifles, nine communication equipment, and more than US$38,000 and $25,000 pesos (about US$2,000). They also arrested the drug lord with two of his bodyguards. The Mexican federal government first confirmed the arrest of the drug lord via Twitter and then issued a short statement of the operative, but did not offer major details until the following day during a formal press conference. That same day, he was flown from the General Lucio Blanco International Airport in Reynosa to Mexico City under tight security and kept at the SEIDO installations, Mexico's organized crime investigatory agency. The government responded to the arrest by strengthening security and increasing the presence of federal troops in northeastern Mexico in order to neutralize any incursion from rival criminal organizations like Los Zetas in the region. On 21 August 2013, he was transferred to the Federal Social Readaptation Center No. 1 maximum security prison in Almoloya de Juárez, State of Mexico, by the Mexican Army.

The Mexican government has not officially confirmed the existence of a successor to Ramírez Treviño's reign. However, the most rumored name is Homero Cárdenas Guillén (El Majadero), the brother of the former leaders Osiel and Antonio. According to U.S. sources, there are three other possible leaders for the Gulf Cartel: Luis Alberto Trinidad Cerón (El Guicho); Juan Francisco Carrizales (El 98); and Alberto de la Cruz Álvarez (El Juanillo).

== Death ==
Ramírez Treviño died in U.S. custody on 13 March 2025 before the conclusion of his trial. He was 63.

== See also ==
- Mexican drug war
