= Homero Cárdenas Guillén =

Mexican crime boss (1966–2014)

- Born: 16 March 1966; Matamoros, Tamaulipas, Mexico
- Died: 28 March 2014 (aged 48)
- Cause of death: Liposuction surgery complications
- Other names: El Orejón ('Big Ears'); El Majadero ('The Stubborn One')
- Occupation: Gulf Cartel leader
- Known for: Drug trafficking
- Predecessor: Mario Ramírez Treviño
- Relatives: Osiel Cárdenas Guillén; Antonio Cárdenas Guillén; Mario Cárdenas Guillén

Homero Enrique Cárdenas Guillén (13 March 1966 – allegedly 28 March 2014), also known by his aliases El Majadero and El Orejón, was a Mexican suspected drug lord and alleged leader of the Gulf Cartel, a drug trafficking organization. He is the brother of the former Gulf Cartel leaders Antonio, Mario, and Osiel Cárdenas Guillen. During the late 1990s, Homero worked for the Gulf Cartel under the tutelage of his brothers. However, after several years of government crackdowns, the Gulf Cartel suffered severe drawbacks, including the death and arrests of Homero's brothers and allies. In August 2013, Homero became the de facto leader of the Gulf Cartel following the arrest of Mario Ramírez Treviño. However, he reportedly died of a heart attack on 28 March 2014.

== Early life ==
Homero Enrique Cárdenas Guillén was born at around 23:45 hours on March 13, 1966 in Matamoros, Tamaulipas, Mexico. He registered his birth certificate on June 22, 1972 and listed his parents as Enrique Cárdenas Gracia and Manuela Guillén Mancilla. He had several brothers and sisters, including Mario, Antonio, and Osiel. Homero left the countryside and relocated in Matamoros like his sister and the rest of his brothers.

== Criminal career ==
Guillén's brother Mario helped Osiel start an auto repair store in Matamoros when Homero was a young adult. However, Mario also introduced his brothers to the drug trade. Mario, the eldest of the three, headed the micro drug business with several other men. Antonio bought the cocaine from other dealers; Osiel sold it in the streets; and Homero had the task of coordinating small-scale drug trafficking rings to the United States.

By the late 1990s, Osiel took control of the Gulf Cartel, a drug-trafficking organization based in northeastern Mexico, while Homero played a lesser role in the organization. Following Osiel's arrest in 2003 and extradition to the United States in 2007, the cartel's leadership passed on to Heriberto Lazcano, who headed Los Zetas (Osiel's private army), Jorge Eduardo Costilla Sánchez, an ex-policeman from Matamoros, and Antonio, one of the Cárdenas Guillén brothers. In 2009, Homero coordinated the cocaine shipments of the Gulf Cartel from the border state of Tamaulipas to the U.S. cities of Brownsville, Houston, and Atlanta. Los Zetas separated from the Gulf Cartel in early 2010 and formed their own criminal group, while Costilla Sánchez and Antonio remained loyal. However, Antonio was killed in a firefight with the Navy in Matamoros in 2010 and his leadership was passed down to his brother Mario, who was arrested in 2012.

=== Gulf Cartel leadership ===
Following its split from Los Zetas, the Gulf Cartel suffered a series of internal strifes between groups loyal to the Cárdenas Guillén clan and those behind the former leader Costilla Sánchez, arrested in 2012. The internal antagonism simmered until the first months of 2013; by that time, however, most of the high-ranking leaders of the criminal organization had been arrested or killed. In August 2013, the Gulf Cartel leader Mario Ramírez Treviño was arrested in a joint operation between the navy and army in northeastern Mexico. Although Mexican officials did not comment on who was next in the line of succession, they speculated that Homero –known by the aliases El Orejón and El Majadero – became the de facto leader.

Guillén's succession as leader, however, was not welcomed by everyone within the Gulf Cartel; on 3 and 4 November 2013, a rival cell of the cartel, a faction known as Los Metros, made their way into Matamoros from Reynosa, Tamaulipas and clashed with Homero's Gulf Cartel faction, a group known as Los Ciclones, in an effort to take over his territory. The incursion put Matamoros residents under a virtual state of siege and resulted in at least 13 deaths of cartel members, according to official reports by the government. Unconfirmed reports placed the death toll much higher, alleging that the killings committed in the rural communities were not counted in the official statement. The authorities allege that the fighting erupted following a disagreement over who should control the Matamoros area; after Los Ciclones and the Cárdenas Guillén clan decided not to give up the turf, violence broke out with Los Metros, the faction based in Reynosa and Río Bravo, Tamaulipas. The Metros were also angry at Homero's faction because one of his family members, Rafael Cárdenas Vela (arrested in 2011), had become a witness for the U.S. government.

In early 2014, the regional Gulf Cartel leaders in Reynosa were reportedly at odds with other high-ranking regional leaders along the U.S.-Mexico border in Tamaulipas over whether or not to allow their factions to fall under the single command structure imposed by Homero, who was making major decisions in the criminal organization and maintaining a low-profile status.

== Alleged death ==
According to sources outside of law enforcement, there were rumors that Homero reportedly died of a heart attack on 28 March 2014 at a hospital in Monterrey, Nuevo León. He had reportedly suffered medical complications following a liposuction surgery at a clinic in Matamoros. The information has not been confirmed and details surrounding his reported death remain in question.

== See also ==
- Mexican drug war
