= Miguel "El Gringo" Villarreal =

American drug trafficker (??–2013)

Miguel Villarreal
- Born: United States
- Died: 10 March 2013 (Not confirmed); Reynosa, Tamaulipas, Mexico
- Other names: El Gringo; Gringo Mike; El Gringo Villarreal; Comandante Gringo (Commander Gringo)
- Occupation: Gulf Cartel leader
- Opponents: Los Zetas; Mario Ramírez Treviño

Miguel Villarreal (died 10 March 2013) was a U.S.-born Mexican suspected drug lord and high-ranking leader of the Gulf Cartel, a criminal group based in Tamaulipas. He was the crime boss of Reynosa, Tamaulipas. Nicknamed El Gringo in reference to his U.S. nationality, Villarreal was identified by authorities as a Gulf Cartel leader in 2010, when he allegedly commanded cells that fought Los Zetas drug cartel in northeastern Mexico. By 2011, he served as the regional kingpin in Miguel Alemán, Tamaulipas and ordered several kidnappings and killings in the South Texas border area from Mexico.

During 2011 and 2012 Mexican media outlets reported on two occasions that Villarreal had been killed in an armed confrontation with either rival drug traffickers and Mexican law enforcement officers. By that point, rival factions within the Gulf Cartel were fighting each other for control of Tamaulipas and the cartel. Although not officially confirmed, Stratfor intelligence agency reported that Villarreal was killed in a three-hour gunfight that left at least three dozen dead in Reynosa, Tamaulipas on 10 March 2013. The shootout was caused by an attempt by Mario Ramírez Treviño, another high-ranking drug lord of the Gulf Cartel, to remove his rivals and become the undisputed leader of the cartel.

== Criminal career ==
Miguel Villarreal acquired his nickname El Gringo by being a U.S. citizen. (Note: He is also known by his aliases Gringo Mike, El Gringo Villarreal, and Comandante Gringo ('Commander Gringo').)

He was identified as a high-ranking leader of the Gulf Cartel by the Procuraduría General de la República (PGR) and the Drug Enforcement Administration (DEA) in July 2010. According to the government report, Villarreal operated as the second-in-command in the Gulf Cartel. He led armed confrontations against Los Zetas, the cartel's rival group in Tamaulipas, Nuevo León, and its neighboring states in northern Mexico.

Los Zetas were a group of soldiers who defected in the late 1990s to work as assassins, bodyguards and drug runners for the Gulf Cartel, then led by Osiel Cárdenas Guillén. They split off from the Cartel in early 2010 following Cárdenas Guillén's arrest and extradition and attempts by Cartel leadership to limit their activities.

By early 2011, Villarreal was the regional boss of the Gulf Cartel in the border city of Miguel Alemán, Tamaulipas, just across the international border from Roma, Texas. Reportedly, Villarreal had ordered his henchman in South Texas to carry out several kidnappings in the Rio Grande Valley and take their victims to Mexico after a cocaine shipment was stolen in 2011. He was also accused of ordering several murders in the Texas-Mexico border area. The modus operandi of Villarreal on U.S. soil was similar to that of the imprisoned Zetas drug lord Jaime González Durán (El Hummer), who conducted kidnappings of rival cartel members in South Texas in 2008. Also in 2011, an internal power struggle within the Gulf Cartel broke loose when the drug lord Samuel Flores Borrego was killed by his own men. Villarreal later became a key player in the cartel's internal strife in the first quarter of 2013.

Although none of the allegations have been confirmed, Villarreal had been reported dead several times by media outlets and civilians. In October 2011, he was reported dead by a Texan media outlet in Valle Hermoso, Tamaulipas following the Gulf Cartel's internal power struggle that broke out in September 2011. A Mexican media outlet claimed that Villarreal was killed during a shootout between drug traffickers and the Mexican Armed Forces in Reynosa, Tamaulipas on 14 August 2012. According to official reports by the Mexican Army, four alleged drug traffickers were killed, but they did not comment on nor confirm any of the rumors surrounding Villarreal's death. They did state, however, that he was working as the Gulf Cartel's jefe de plaza (crime boss) in Reynosa.

Villarreal was allegedly responsible for planting several car bombs in Nuevo Laredo, Ciudad Victoria, and Monterrey in 2012. He was also behind a car theft operation in Reynosa on 9 March 2013, when gunmen working for him stole 18 vehicles from 6 car dealerships.

=== Gulf Cartel infighting ===
==== Battle with Mario Pelón Ramírez ====
On the night of 10 March 2013, rival factions within the Gulf Cartel clashed when gunmen loyal to Villareal and henchmen of Mario Pelón Ramírez, another high-ranking Gulf Cartel leader, battled in a three-hour gunfight in Reynosa, paralyzing the avenues and streets of the city while the Mexican Armed Forces missed most of the fighting. When the melee ended, the Mexican government confirmed two civilian deaths, but unofficial reports suggested that about 40 Gulf Cartel gunmen were killed; the number may be higher because the cartel members reportedly carried away the corpses of their fallen comrades in their vehicles. (Note: According to the authorities of Tamaulipas, only two bystanders were killed that day, a taxi driver and a boy. The Monitor newspaper reported at least three dozen bodies (36 people), while other outlets talked of over 50. One anonymous officier in Reynosa indicated that investigators managed to recover only two bodies. He believes that if there were more casualties, "... their bodies had been removed by the time he arrived.")

In the shootout, unofficial reports claimed that Villarreal's ally, Jesús García Román (El Puma), was killed. Other reports stated that high-ranking Gulf Cartel leader Sergio Ortegón Silva (Comandante Cortez), who led the faction known as Los Ceros (The Zeros), confronted Villarreal and his forces. (Note: Los Ceros is a group within the Gulf Cartel that allegedly served as the private army of Samuel Flores Borrego, a deceased drug trafficker.)

Ramírez Treviño and Villarreal vied for the control of the drug trade operations in Reynosa, but the former had taken the overall command of the Gulf Cartel and committed himself to kill anyone that he considered his enemy, which included Villarreal. Ramírez Treviño ordered his men to "erase everything and [kill] everyone that had ties with El Gringo", thereby creating a single structure among the cartel's commanders. Ramírez Treviño was planning, with the help of the Sinaloa Cartel, to oust Villarreal for failing to stay low-profile in Reynosa, and because he considered Villarreal a "bloodthirsty" leader. In addition, Ramírez Treviño distrusted him because Villarreal had ties with Ramírez Treviño's rival Juan Mejía González (El R1). Stratfor global intelligence agency indicated that the infighting between both men might have occurred after Villarreal allegedly betrayed the Gulf Cartel and started working with Heriberto Lazcano Lazcano (El Lazca), the former leader of the rival Los Zetas cartel. Intelligence reports indicated that Ramírez Treviño ordered his men to kill more than 60 people associated with Villarreal in Miguel Alemán and Camargo, Tamaulipas throughout March 2013 to reunify the Gulf Cartel under his power.

After several prolonged battles for the control of Reynosa, Ramírez Treviño became the top leader of the Gulf Cartel in 2013, a position he had been vying since the drug lords Costilla Sánchez and Cárdenas Guillén were arrested in late 2012. Although the information was not officially confirmed, Stratfor intelligence agency had suggested that Villarreal and several of his top associates were killed in the infighting on 10 March 2013.

== See also ==
- Mexican drug war
