= Mario Cárdenas Guillén =

Mexican cartel leader

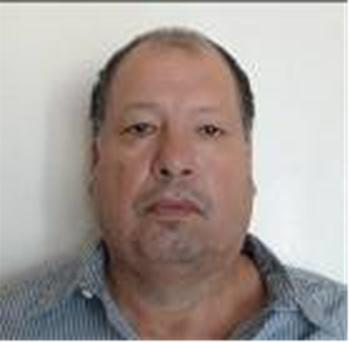
- Born: Matamoros, Tamaulipas, Mexico
- Other names: M-1; El Gordo
- Occupation: Gulf Cartel leader
- Predecessor: Antonio Cárdenas Guillén (Brother)
- Criminal charges: Organized crime, drug trafficking
- Criminal status: Arrested
- Children: Mario Alberto Cárdenas Medina

Mario Alberto Cárdenas Guillén is a former leader of the Mexican criminal group called the Gulf Cartel. He is the brother of Osiel Cárdenas Guillén and Antonio Cárdenas Guillén.

Mario was imprisoned in Matamoros from 1995 to 2003, but was later transferred to another prison in Jalisco after the Mexican authorities concluded that he was still managing marijuana and cocaine shipments behind bars. In 2007, he completed his sentence and was released. When his brother Antonio was killed on 5 November 2010, Mario took the lead of the Gulf Cartel along with Jorge Eduardo Costilla Sánchez. But by then, the Gulf Cartel had separated from Los Zetas, the former enforcer gang of the cartel. Part of the Gulf Cartel, instead of lining up behind Mario, decided to work for Costilla Sánchez. This led for cartel's division and infighting between the two factions, where Mario and Costilla Sánchez turned their guns against each other and Los Zetas.

On 3 September 2012, the Mexican Navy arrested Mario in the city of Altamira, Tamaulipas. He was extradited to the United States on 17 May 2022.

== Criminal career ==
Cárdenas was first arrested in 1995 in Mexico on charges of organized crime and drug trafficking and spent 11 years in prison. While incarcerated in the 'Cereso II' prison in Matamoros, Mario Cárdenas continued to organize the shipment of large amounts of cocaine and marijuana into the U.S. from an automobile body repair shop within the prison walls, having his sentence increased in 2003. While in prison, Mario was also known for holding large parties, inviting prostitutes, organized gambling rings for horse races and cockfights, and having all sort of commodities. He was then transferred to 'Puente Grande', a maximum security prison and after serving an 11-year sentence he was released in 2007 and rejoined the Gulf Cartel.

=== Arrest ===
Cárdenas Guillén, wearing a black bullet-proof vest and flanked by two ski-masked marines, was presented on national television on 4 September 2012. According to reports issued by the Mexican Navy, Cárdenas Guillén was arrested a day before in the city of Altamira, Tamaulipas. At the time of his arrest, Cárdenas Guillén was carrying a rifle in front of a building entrance, along with $10,000 in cash, radiocommunication equipment, ammunition, several credit cards, and four envelopes containing cocaine. The arrest of Mario was one of the "highest-profile arrests in months" and a powerful blow to the Gulf Cartel, which lost much of its influence after it separated from Los Zetas in early 2010.

Mario took the leadership of the Gulf Cartel after the death of his brother Antonio Cárdenas Guillén, alias Tony Tormenta, in November 2010. Nonetheless, the death of his brother, among other things, created a division in the Gulf Cartel: those loyal to Cárdenas Guillén and those loyal to Jorge Eduardo Costilla Sánchez. The latter, however, reportedly enjoys some protection from the Mexican military and aid of the Sinaloa Cartel, another drug trafficking organization. Nonetheless, the arrest of Mario weakens the power of the Cárdenas Guillén family.

A close associate of Mario known as Juan Gabriel "Sierra" Montes was captured by the Mexican Naval Infantry in Guadalajara, Jalisco on 11 September 2012. He allegedly conducted drug trafficking operations for the Gulf Cartel and headed a hit squad faction in the cartel called Los Kalimanes.

== Gulf Cartel infighting ==
=== Background ===
In the late 1990s, Osiel Cárdenas Guillén, the former leader of the Gulf cartel, had other similar groups besides Los Zetas established in several cities in Tamaulipas. Each of these groups were identified by their radio codes: the Rojos were based in Reynosa; the Metros were headquartered in Matamoros; and the Lobos were established in Laredo. The infighting between the Metros and the Rojos of the Gulf cartel began in 2010, when Juan Mejía González, nicknamed El R-1, was overlooked as the candidate of the regional boss of Reynosa and was sent to La Frontera Chica, an area that encompasses Miguel Alemán, Camargo and Ciudad Mier – directly across the U.S.–Mexico border from Starr County, Texas. The area that Mejía González wanted was given to Flores Borrego, suggesting that the Metros were above the Rojos.

Unconfirmed information released by The Monitor indicated that two leaders of the Rojos, Mejía González and Rafael Cárdenas Vela, teamed up to kill Flores Borrego. Cárdenas Vela had held a grudge on Flores Borrego and the Metros because he believed that they had led the Mexican military to track down and kill his uncle Antonio Cárdenas Guillén (Tony Tormenta) on 5 November 2010. Other sources indicate that the infighting could have been caused by the suspicions that the Rojos were "too soft" on the Gulf cartel's bitter enemy, Los Zetas. When the Gulf cartel and Los Zetas split in early 2010, some members of the Rojos stayed with the Gulf cartel, while others decided to leave and join the forces of Los Zetas.

InSight Crime explains that the fundamental disagreement between the Rojos and the Metros was over leadership. Those who were more loyal to the Cárdenas family stayed with the Rojos, while those loyal to Jorge Eduardo Costilla Sánchez, like Flores Borrego, defended the Metros.

Originally, the Gulf cartel was running smoothly, but the infighting between the two factions in the Gulf cartel triggered when Flores Borrego was killed on 2 September 2011. When the Rojos turned on the Metros, the largest faction in the Gulf cartel, firefights broke throughout Tamaulipas and drug loads were stolen among each other, but the Metros managed to retain control of the major cities that stretched from Matamoros to Miguel Alemán, Tamaulipas.

== Personal life ==
Guillén was born in Matamoros, Tamaulipas, Mexico. Mario had two brothers working for the Gulf cartel: Osiel, who was arrested by the Mexican Army on 2003 and sentenced to 25 years in prison, and Antonio, who was killed during a confrontation with Mexican Marines on 5 November 2010.

Mario has one son, Mario Alberto Cárdenas Medina (a.k.a. El Betillo), who was captured along with three others by the Mexican authorities in Matamoros, Tamaulipas on 9 June 2009. He confessed to have been a top lieutenant of the Gulf Cartel under his uncle Antonio Cárdenas, co-leader of the organization. Cárdenas Medina allegedly took control of the shipments of cocaine in the Playa Bagdad area before moving them north to the United States.

Reports indicated that Mario's brother, Homero Cárdenas Guillén, was allegedly part of the Gulf Cartel in late 2010.

On 30 June 2019, Mario's son was once again arrested by Mexican authorities. He was arrested in the State of Mexico with a female companion identified as Miriam "M."

== See also ==
- War on drugs
- Mérida Initiative
- Mexican drug war
