= Los Rojos =

Mexican drug organization

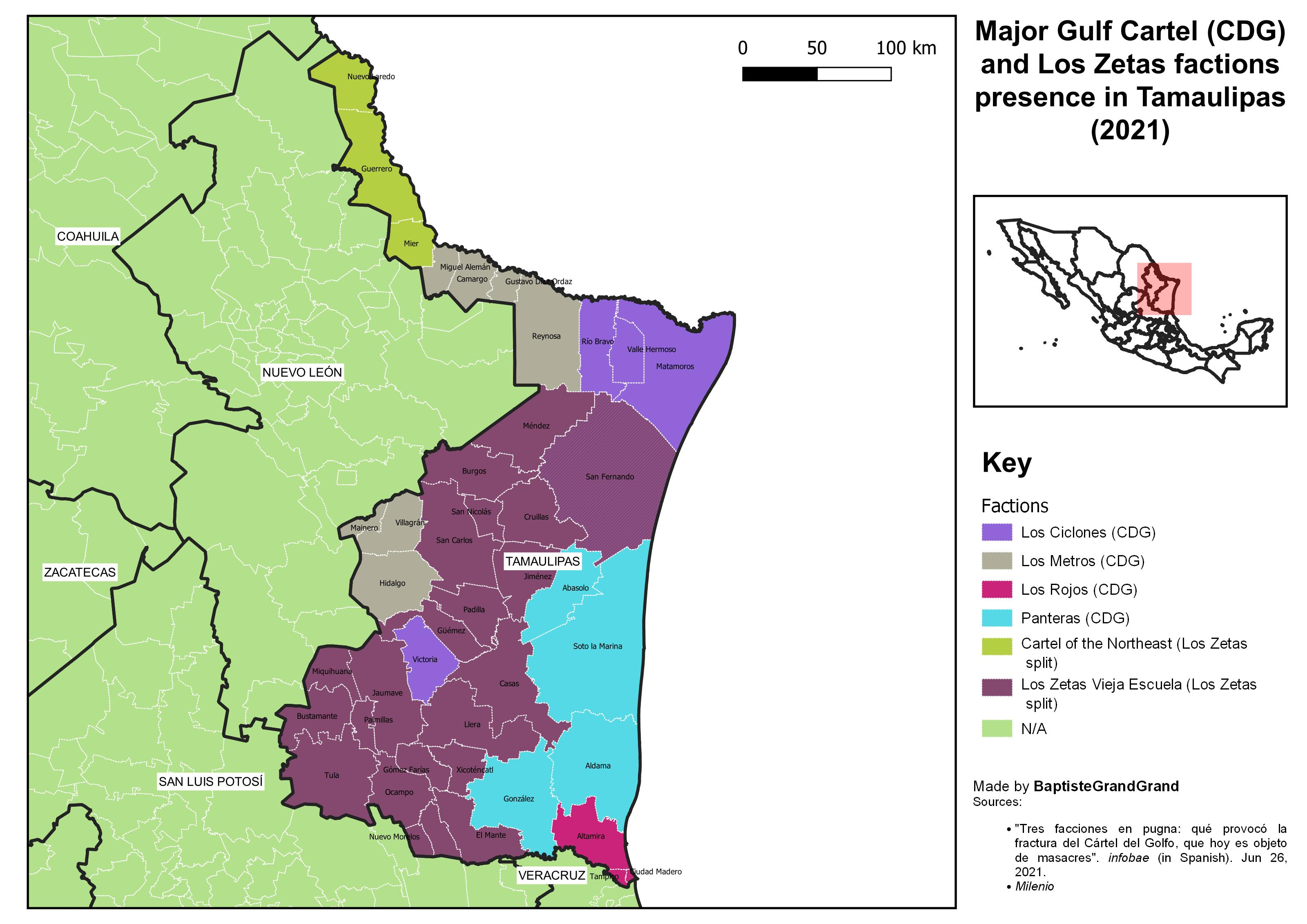
- Los Rojos (2021)
- Founded: 1990s by Osiel Cárdenas Guillén
- Founding location: Reynosa, Tamaulipas, Mexico
- Years active: 1990s–present
- Territory: Tamaulipas, Morelos, Puebla, Guerrero
- Ethnicity: Mexican
- Leader: Zenen Nava Sánchez
- Activities: Murder, kidnapping
- Allies: Gulf Cartel; Los Mexicles; Sureños; Mexican Mafia; Sinaloa Cartel
- Rivals: Los Metros; Los Zetas; MS-13; Los Negros; Jalisco New Generation Cartel; Beltrán-Leyva Cartel; Los Ardillos; Guerreros Unidos

Los Rojos is a faction of a Mexican drug trafficking organization known as the Gulf Cartel. The group was formed in the late 1990s during the reign of Osiel Cárdenas Guillén, the former leader of the cartel, to provide security to the organization's leaders as the cartel's armed wing.

The former leader was Juan Mejía González, alias El R1. On 2 September 2011, Mejía González and Rafael Cárdenas Vela, two leaders of the Rojos, ordered the assassination of the drug lord Samuel Flores Borrego, who commanded the Metros, another faction within the Gulf cartel.

The death of Flores Borrego triggered a series of confrontations between the Rojos and the Metros throughout the end of 2011. Nonetheless, in early 2012, the Metros emerged victorious in the infighting and have relegated the Rojos to a less-powerful position in the cartel operatives.

== Fight with Los Metros ==
In the late 1990s, Osiel Cárdenas Guillén, the former leader of the Gulf cartel, had other similar groups besides Los Zetas established in several cities in Tamaulipas. Each of these groups were identified by their radio codes: the Rojos were based in Reynosa; the Metros were headquartered in Matamoros; and the Lobos were established in Laredo. The infighting between the Metros and the Rojos of the Gulf cartel began in 2010, when Juan Mejía González, nicknamed El R-1, was overlooked as the candidate of the regional boss of Reynosa and was sent to the "Frontera Chica," an area that encompasses Miguel Alemán, Camargo and Ciudad Mier – directly across the U.S.–Mexico border from Starr County, Texas. The area that Mejía González wanted was given to Flores Borrego, suggesting that the Metros were above the Rojos.

Unconfirmed information released by The Monitor indicated that two leaders of the Rojos, Mejía González and Rafael Cárdenas Vela, teamed up to kill Flores Borrego. Cárdenas Vela had held a grudge on Flores Borrego and the Metros because he believed that they had led the Mexican military to track down and kill his uncle Antonio Cárdenas Guillén (Tony Tormenta) on 5 November 2010. Other sources indicate that the infighting could have been caused by the suspicions that the Rojos were "too soft" on the Gulf cartel's bitter enemy, Los Zetas. When the Gulf cartel and Los Zetas split in early 2010, some members of the Rojos stayed with the Gulf cartel, while others decided to leave and join the forces of Los Zetas.

InSight Crime explains that the fundamental disagreement between the Rojos and the Metros was over leadership. Those who were more loyal to the Cárdenas family stayed with the Rojos, while those loyal to Jorge Eduardo Costilla Sánchez, like Flores Borrego, defended the Metros.

Originally, the Gulf cartel was running smoothly, but the infighting between the two factions in the Gulf cartel triggered when Flores Borrego was killed on 2 September 2011. When the Rojos turned on the Metros, the largest faction in the Gulf cartel, firefights broke throughout Tamaulipas and drug loads were stolen among each other, but the Metros managed to retain control of the major cities that stretched from Matamoros to Miguel Alemán, Tamaulipas.

== Southern Mexico ==
Santiago Mazari Hernández "El Carrete" was arrested in Leonardo Bravo, Guerrero on August 1, 2019 after a ten-year search. Also arrested was "Marco N," his presumed principal operator. Mazari Hernández's sister, Gabriela Mazari Hernández "La Gorda", said to be responsible for logistics of the group, had been arrested last March. With these arrests, police believe the cartel has been virtually dismantled. Their primary rivals in Morelos and Guerrero were Jalisco New Generation Cartel, the Beltrán-Leyva Cartel, and Guerreros Unidos.
