= Samuel Flores Borrego =

Mexican drug trafficker (1972–2011)

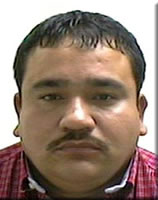
- Born: 6 August 1972; Matamoros, Tamaulipas, Mexico
- Died: 2 September 2011 (aged 39); Reynosa, Tamaulipas
- Cause of death: Shooting
- Other names: Eight aliases: Tres; El M3; M Three; El Metro 3; El Cabezón; Metro Three; Commander Tres
- Occupation: Gulf Cartel's drug lord
- Employers: Tamaulipas State Police; Gulf Cartel
- Known for: Drug trafficking
- Predecessor: Gregorio Sauceda Gamboa, Hector Sauceda Gamboa
- Successor: Mario Ramírez Treviño

Notes
- U.S. wanted $5 million for his arrest.

Samuel Flores Borrego (a.k.a. Metro 3; 6 August 1972 – 2 September 2011) was a Mexican drug lord and high-ranking lieutenant of the Gulf Cartel. He was a former state judicial policeman who protected the ex-leader of the Gulf cartel, Osiel Cárdenas Guillén. Upon his arrest, Flores Borrego became a close associate of Jorge Eduardo Costilla Sánchez, the former leader of the criminal organization.

Although born in Matamoros, Flores Borrego was closely linked to the cities of Miguel Aleman, Tamaulipas where he was the plaza boss for the Gulf Cartel for several years after the arrest of Gulf Cartel boss Osiel Càrdenas Guillén and Reynosa, Tamaulipas, where he had the biggest impact after taking over after the death of fellow drug lord and close associate Héctor Sauceda Gamboa, who was also the brother of fellow Metro founder and another close associate to Flores Borrego, Gregorio Sauceda Gamboa.

The Mexican authorities believe that Flores Borrego is responsible for the split of the Gulf cartel and Los Zetas, a cartel originally formed by deserters of the Mexican Army Special Forces hired in the late 1990s as the private army of the Gulf cartel. While operating in Reynosa in early 2010, Flores Borrego ordered the abduction and execution of a leader of Los Zetas. After the slaying, Los Zetas demanded Flores Borrego's death and threatened to go to war if the Gulf cartel did not hand over the assassin. Nonetheless, Flores Borrego ignored their demands and consequently broke the organization's alliance.

On 2 September 2011, Flores Borrego was found dead along with a local police officer on the outskirts of the border city of Reynosa, Tamaulipas. The Mexican authorities indicated that he had been killed by members within his own criminal group over disagreements and territorial disputes.

== Gulf-Zeta cartels split ==
In the late 1990s, Osiel Cárdenas Guillén, the former leader of the Gulf Cartel, began recruiting members of the Mexican Army to protect his territory, personnel, and drug trafficking operations. These original deserters, who were known as Los Zetas, came from the Special Forces squadron of the army, arguably the best trained branch of the Mexican military. Upon the arrest and extradition of Cárdenas Guillén in 2003 and 2007 respectively, Los Zetas strengthen its role in the Gulf cartel, but managed to retain its alliance. Nonetheless, that alliance lasted until early 2010, when disagreements reached a turning point. On 18 January 2010, several members of the Gulf cartel kidnapped Víctor Peña Mendoza, a leader of Los Zetas nicknamed Concord 3 and a close associate and friend of Miguel Treviño Morales, alias Z-40. When he was held captive, Peña Mendoza was asked to switch alliances and join the Gulf cartel, but he refused, earning a beating and an execution, presumably carried out by Flores Borrego.

Treviño Morales heard about the incident and issued an ultimatum to Flores Borrego and Jorge Eduardo Costilla Sánchez:

"Hand over the assassin of my friend, you son of a bitch ... You have until the 25th, if you don't comply, there will be war."

Both of the Gulf cartel leaders ignored the command, and Treviño Morales did not wait to avenge the death of his friend. On 30 January 2010, Treviño Morales kidnapped and slaughtered 16 Gulf cartel members in Reynosa, Tamaulipas, marking the start of the cartel war between the Gulf cartel and Los Zetas in the Mexican states of Tamaulipas, Nuevo León, and Veracruz that has left thousands of people killed. Los Zetas used violent and intimidation tactics to expand and gained a notorious reputation as Mexico's most violent drug trafficking organization. Over time, it managed to take control of most of the territories owned by the Gulf cartel when they had once essentially operated as a single organization.

== Kingpin Act sanction ==
On 24 March 2010, the United States Department of the Treasury sanctioned Flores Borrego under the Foreign Narcotics Kingpin Designation Act (sometimes referred to simply as the "Kingpin Act"), for his involvement in drug trafficking along with fifty-three other international criminals and ten foreign entities. The act prohibited U.S. citizens and companies from doing any kind of business activity with him, and virtually froze all his assets in the U.S.

== Assassination ==
On 2 September 2011, the Mexican authorities discovered the bullet-ridden corpse of Flores Borrego inside a Ford Lobo truck on a highway that connects Reynosa, Tamaulipas with the industrial city of Monterrey. His body was found along with the corpse of a policeman named Eloy Lerma García from Gustavo Díaz Ordaz, Tamaulipas. Before being executed, the two men were stripped to their underwear, severely beaten, tortured and then shot dead execution-style; their corpses were then left on the bed of the Ford Lobo along with a written message directed to the Gulf Cartel faction Flores Borrego commanded – a group known as Los Metros. Although the information was never confirmed, the Mexican Army alleges that Flores Borrego was killed by "members of his own cartel," presumably on orders from the Gulf Cartel leaders Juan Mejía González (El R-1) and Rafael Cárdenas Vela (El Junior). After his death, several factions within the Gulf Cartel went to war with each other, resulting in the deaths and arrests of several high-ranking drug traffickers. An anonymous informant outside of law enforcement but with direct knowledge of the Gulf Cartel criminal workings suggests that El Metro 3 was killed because Mejía González was appointed as the crime boss of "La Frontera Chica," a narrow stretch in the northern part of Tamaulipas, while Flores Borrego was moved to Reynosa after the death of Sauceda Gamboa, suggesting that he was above Mejía González in the cartel's structure. Other unconfirmed reports suggest that Cárdenas Vela teamed up with Mejía González to kill Flores Borrego because the former believed that the Gulf Cartel betrayed his uncle Antonio Cárdenas Guillén (Tony Tormenta) by leading the Mexican military to his whereabouts, and eventually killing him after a gun fight in November 2010 in Matamoros.

Mario Ramírez Treviño, who had been working as the regional boss of Ciudad Victoria, Tamaulipas, was appointed within few hours of Flores Borrego's death as the new crime boss of Reynosa, and was given "explicit orders to make the [drug market] profitable again."

=== Rooster statue ===
In January 2012 at the entrance of a neighborhood in Reynosa, Tamaulipas, where Flores Borrego was rumored to have lived and on one of Reynosa's busiest avenues, a bronze rooster statue was erected in tribute of him. It is not clear who placed the statue but it was adorned with a wreath of flowers bearing the name of "Samuel Flores Borrego." Nicknamed El Gallo de Vista Hermosa ("The Rooster of Vista Hermosa"), the statue mysteriously appeared overnight, and has worried, puzzled, and attracted curious residents of Reynosa. The rooster statue became a Twitter sensation, where Reynosa residents uploaded their own pictures of the monument and created a hashtag to specifically talk about it. During the first week, the residents showed fear of the statue, but that feeling quickly dissolved; one Twitter user said on his page that people were posing for pictures in front of the statue. In addition, a Twitter user noticed that the statue used its own light source at night, and wondered how it got connected and who was paying for the electric bill. A month later, however, the rooster was moved to the Reynosa Palenque, a rodeo arena and live-music venue a few blocks from its original location. Reportedly, the rooster statue once stood outside a restaurant located along a highway that connects Reynosa with Nuevo Laredo. The man who supposedly owned the restaurant was the slain boss of the Gulf cartel, Samuel Flores Borrego, El Metro 3.

The statue's location was found on the same highway where the banda singer Valentín Elizalde (nicknamed the "Golden Rooster") was gunned down in November 2006. According to The Monitor, it is rumored that Elizalde had close ties with the Sinaloa Cartel and that he was gunned down by Los Zetas, who were still under an alliance with the Gulf cartel – which was a bitter enemy of the Sinaloa cartel. The night he was killed, Elizalde had sung To My Enemies on YouTube at a concert in Reynosa, but "had been warned not to sing that song in Reynosa..." because some speculated that the song mocked the Gulf cartel and Los Zetas and would lead to his assassination. Despite the threats, Elizalde did sing it and was killed; his slaying served as a symbolic blow of the Gulf cartel against the Sinaloa organization. But over the years, the alliances have broken and that sentiment has changed. The Gulf cartel and Los Zetas broke relations in early 2010, and the Sinaloa's battle against Los Zetas has "turned old enemies into friends." The rooster statue now serves as a symbolic reminder that the Sinaloa cartel is present in the area, with the flowers as a display that they have respect for the Gulf cartel.

=== Narco-Rap legacy ===
There are several Narco-Rap music videos on YouTube dedicated to Flores Borrego from a Reynosa hip-hop group composed of two rappers, Cano and Blunt. The song is called The Song of Metro 3 on YouTube and praises the drug lord for his "ferocity and loyalty." The video consists of a handful of images of Cano and Blunt in gangster poses and in mafia outfits. The narco hip hop video also has photos of bullet-ridden SUV's, police checkpoints, and military convoys.

=== Shirt references ===
During a routine patrol in Reynosa on 10 February 2012, Mexico's Federal Police spotted six abandoned SUV's parked in the city's major avenue. Inside the vehicles – which turned out to be stolen – the police officers found several ammunition magazines and rounds. The most noteworthy finding in the seizure were several T-shirts, caps, and patches with the insignias bearing "CDG," the Spanish acronym for the Gulf Cartel. Some of the shirts found inside the vehicles, however, had references to Flores Borrego, who had been slain in September 2011.

=== Birthday banners ===
Early in the morning on 6 August 2012, several banners celebrating Flores Borrego's birthday were put up on bridges in several cities across Mexico by alleged members of the Gulf Cartel. In the border city of Reynosa, Tamaulipas, where Flores Borrego was killed in September 2011, a banner was hung from a major avenue. The written text, found below, was signed with several nicknames from alleged members of the cartel. Those alleged members are from "The School of Metro 3" who were a part of the Metros loyal to Metro 3. Those members were el Puma, el Toro, el Simple just to name a few, as well as 2 founding members of Los Zetas, Galindo Mellado Cruz and Raúl Hernández Barrón, who sided with the Gulf Cartel and joined Los Metros after the split.

"Mr. Samuel Flores Borrego, Lt. Metro 3, where ever you are, we know you are doing fine – we know you're doing much better. Today is your birthday, and we remember you in a special way for what you represented in our lives and for what you still represent, even though you are not physically present. You preferred to be betrayed than to mistrust your friends.

You taught us how to carry out justice rather than vengeance ... [and] today we call you our carnal (brother); we will always remember you, and that will be easy. The difficult thing will be forgetting you."

A day after the banners were put up in the city of Matamoros, Tamaulipas, gunfights broke out between the Metros and the Rojos. The fact that the Metros made a push into Matamoros serves as a sign that they are determined to kill off those who had turned against the Gulf cartel in the past – the Rojos. Reportedly, Jorge Eduardo Costilla Sánchez sent in several armed convoys of the Metros into the city with the backing of the Sinaloa Cartel.

== Gulf Cartel infighting ==
The division of the Gulf Cartel into separate factions started in November 2010, following the death of drug lord Antonio Cárdenas Guillén, who was killed by the Mexican Navy in an eight-hour-long shootout in Matamoros. The gangsters loyal to the Cárdenas Guillén clan formed their own group: Los Rojos. Those remaining and loyal to Jorge Eduardo Costilla Sánchez (El Coss) started their own group too: Los Metros. The fight between these two factions began in September 2011, when alleged members of the Los Rojos cartel killed Flores Borrego. During the 1990s and early 2000s, however, the cartel was headed by the imprisoned Osiel Cárdenas Guillén, who "operated with a certain structure that allowed for rivalries among lieutenants to exist without affecting the organization as a whole". When he was arrested and extradited to the United States in 2003 and 2007 respectively, the remaining lieutenants in the Gulf Cartel fought for the leadership void left by Cárdenas Guillén. This resulted in the death of several leaders and in the split with Los Zetas, the armed wing of the Gulf Cartel that was originally formed by soldiers who deserted the Mexican Army to serve as bodyguards of Cárdenas Guillén.

The Gulf Cartel maintains a strong operational control over Reynosa and Matamoros, Tamaulipas, where they earn much of their income from the international narcotics trade and from human smuggling. They receive support from the Sinaloa Cartel and the Knights Templar Cartel in their fight against Los Zetas across northeastern Mexico. Los Metros gang of the Gulf Cartel, in particular, receives aid from the Sinaloa Cartel to confront Los Rojos.

== Bibliography ==
- Gibler, John (2011). To Die in Mexico: Dispatches from Inside the Drug War. City Lights Bookstore. ISBN 978-0872865174.
- Grayson, George (2012). The Executioner's Men: Los Zetas, Rogue Soldiers, Criminal Entrepreneurs, and the Shadow State They Created. Transaction Publishers. ISBN 9781412846172.
