= Juan Reyes Mejía-González =

Mexican drug lord (born 1975)

Juan Mejía González
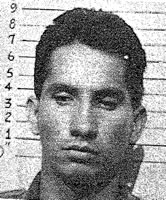
- Born: 18 November 1975 (age 50); Ciudad Mier, Tamaulipas, Mexico
- Other names: El R1; El Quique; El Kike
- Occupations: Gulf Cartel's drug lord and leader of Los Rojos
- Known for: Drug trafficking money laundering
- Height: 5 ft 9 in (175 cm)

Notes
- *The U.S. Department of State offers up to $5 million US dollars for information leading to his arrest/conviction.

Juan Reyes Mejía-González (born 18 November 1975), commonly referred to by his alias R1, is a Mexican drug lord and high-ranking member in the Gulf Cartel who allegedly heads Los Rojos, a faction within the cartel.

Mejía González was often accredited as the "second-in-command" in the Gulf organization. He is responsible for controlling the flow of cocaine from Central America and South America to the drug corridors between Nuevo Laredo and Reynosa, Tamaulipas. In March 2008, Mejía González was indicted in Washington, D.C., and placed as one of the most-wanted fugitives by the U.S. government.

Mejía González is allegedly responsible for ordering the assassination of Samuel Flores Borrego, a drug lord of the Metros faction in the Gulf cartel, on 2 September 2011. Flores Borrego's assassination triggered a series of confrontations between the two factions in the Mexican state of Tamaulipas. The Metros faction emerged victorious in early 2012, and Mejía González has fallen off the radar and has not been heard of since then.

== Kingpin Act sanction ==
On 24 March 2010, the United States Department of the Treasury sanctioned Mejía González under the Foreign Narcotics Kingpin Designation Act (sometimes referred to simply as the "Kingpin Act"), for his involvement in drug trafficking along with fifty-three other international criminals and ten foreign entities. The act prohibited U.S. citizens and companies from doing any kind of business activity with him, and virtually froze all his assets in the U.S.

== Gulf cartel infighting ==
=== Background ===
In the late 1990s, Osiel Cárdenas Guillén, the former leader of the Gulf cartel, had other similar groups besides Los Zetas established in several cities in Tamaulipas. Each of these groups were identified by their radio codes: the Rojos were based in Reynosa; the Metros were headquartered in Matamoros; and the Lobos were established in Laredo. The infighting between the Metros and the Rojos of the Gulf cartel began in 2010, when Mejía González was overlooked as the candidate of the regional boss of Reynosa and was sent to La Frontera Chica, an area that encompasses Miguel Alemán, Camargo and Ciudad Mier, Tamaulipas – directly across the U.S.–Mexico border from Starr County, Texas. The area that Mejía González wanted was given to Flores Borrego, suggesting that the Metros were above the Rojos.

Unconfirmed information released by The Monitor indicated that two leaders of the Rojos, Mejía González and Rafael Cárdenas Vela, teamed up to kill Flores Borrego. Cárdenas Vela had held a grudge on Flores Borrego and the Metros because he believed that they had led the Mexican military to track down and kill his uncle Antonio Cárdenas Guillén (Tony Tormenta) on 5 November 2010. Other sources indicate that the infighting could have been caused by the suspicions that the Rojos were "too soft" on the Gulf cartel's bitter enemy, Los Zetas. When the Gulf cartel and Los Zetas split in early 2010, some members of the Rojos stayed with the Gulf cartel, while others decided to leave and join the forces of Los Zetas.

InSight Crime explains that the fundamental disagreement between the Rojos and the Metros was over leadership. Those who were more loyal to the Cárdenas family stayed with the Rojos, while those loyal to Jorge Eduardo Costilla Sánchez, like Flores Borrego, defended the Metros.

Originally, the Gulf cartel was running smoothly, but the infighting between the two factions in the Gulf cartel triggered when Flores Borrego was killed on 2 September 2011. When the Rojos turned on the Metros, the largest faction in the Gulf cartel, firefights broke throughout Tamaulipas and drug loads were stolen among each other, but the Metros managed to retain control of the major cities that stretched from Matamoros to Miguel Alemán, Tamaulipas.

== Supposed death references ==
Los Zetas put up a banner in the state of Zacatecas on 20 September 2012 alleging that Mejía González was dead and speaking out against the alliance between the Gulf Cartel and the Knights Templar Cartel.

== Family ==
On 20 May 2011, Romeo Eduardo Mejía González, Mejía González's brother, was arrested in Reynosa along with two other cartel members.

== Indictments ==
Mejía González was charged in a Federal indictment in 2008 with money laundering and drug trafficking conspiracies, and the U.S. Department of State is currently offering up to $5 million US dollars for information leading to his arrest.
