= Rafael Cárdenas Vela =

Mexican drug lord

- Mug shot of Cárdenas Vela
- Born: Matamoros, Tamaulipas
- Other names: El Rolex; El Junior; Comandante 900
- Occupation: Gulf Cartel leader
- Known for: Drug trafficking, Identity theft, money laundering
- Title: Gulf Cartel drug lord
- Term: 2000–2011
- Predecessor: José Luis Zúñiga Hernández
- Relatives: Osiel Cárdenas Guillén; Antonio Cárdenas Guillén; Mario Cárdenas Guillén (uncles)

Rafael Cárdenas Vela (a.k.a. El Junior) is a former Mexican drug lord and high-ranking lieutenant of the Gulf Cartel. He is the nephew of Antonio and Osiel Cárdenas Guillén, two men who at one time led the criminal organization.

Born and raised in Matamoros, Tamaulipas, Cárdenas Vela began his criminal career in the year 2000, where he served as the regional boss of the Gulf Cartel in San Fernando, Tamaulipas. During his time in power, he reportedly bribed and threatened local leaders and policemen in order allow the Gulf Cartel to introduce and move narcotics around the municipality freely. Nine years later, Cárdenas Vela was promoted by his superiors to the Río Bravo, Tamaulipas corridor, directly south across the U.S-Mexico border. In Río Bravo, he reportedly supervised cocaine and marijuana shipments heading to the United States and oversaw human smuggling rings.

The death of his uncle Antonio in November 2010 created an internal division in the Gulf Cartel, but Cárdenas Vela managed to become the regional boss of the cartel in Matamoros in March 2011. Amid the turmoil, Cárdenas Vela began to have problems with the drug lord Jorge Eduardo Costilla Sánchez and his henchmen. Fearing for his own life, Cárdenas Vela fled to the state of Texas and managed the operatives of the cartel behind the scenes. But his career came to an end on 20 October 2011 when federal agents arrested him in Port Isabel, Texas.

In the Gulf Cartel, Cárdenas Vela made more than $5 million and ensured that that money "went into the pockets of Mexican law enforcement officers as bribes," and had about "500 armed men at his beck and call."

== Criminal career ==
=== Rise to power ===
Beginning in the year 2000, Cárdenas Vela spent several years as the drug boss of San Fernando, Tamaulipas, a city just 30 miles south of Matamoros and with an important drug corridor. As leader, the first thing he reportedly did was visit the city's mayor, police forces, newspapers, and media outlets to pay them off or made sure they understood that he was in charge. When it was time to move cocaine shipments, Cárdenas Vela notified the police and warned them not to get out of their headquarters until he called them back. Introducing cocaine through San Fernando, however, was a difficult task for the Gulf Cartel; due to the military checkpoint in the municipality, the cartel had to find its way in moving narcotics. If they could not get it through the checkpoints or surround the base by using dirt roads, aircraft would be used to bring cocaine in 500 kilograms per load. The planes would then arrive at strips the cartel made, and over ten men would unload the drugs and take them for storage in San Fernando, under the supervision of Cárdenas Vela. Once all the drugs were unloaded and in San Fernando, the drug bosses of the border cities would send their henchmen to pick up the loads in large armed convoys. The armed men reportedly made checkpoints throughout the highway to prevent any rival drug gangs to interrupt their operatives and to make sure the military did not get near. According to Cárdenas Vela, sometimes it took all day and night to count all of the drug loads. When the Gulf Cartel was sure that the highways were safe, they would move the drugs north to the border.

By the year 2009, he became the gatekeeper of Río Bravo, Tamaulipas, a city that lies directly across the Mexico-United States border from Donna, Texas a major smuggling route to the United States. Cárdenas Vela led the cartel in Río Bravo very similarly to how he managed the cartel operatives in San Fernando. However, given its geographical location, Río Bravo was much more violent than San Fernando. In Río Bravo, Cárdenas Vela's men smuggled marijuana across the Rio Grande and trafficked cocaine through the international bridges. But to ensure that the cocaine was not intercepted, the cartel reportedly bribed U.S. Border Patrol agents in the bridges at Donna and Progreso, Texas. Cárdenas Vela also controlled the human smuggling rings in the area and had them go across the Rio Grande, although separately from the marijuana traffickers. Half of the river was used to smuggle illegal aliens across the border, and the other half was used for marijuana traffickers. These two activities were never mixed, particularly because the U.S. Border Patrol agents catch immigrants much easier.

After the death of his uncle, Antonio Cárdenas Guillén (a.k.a. Tony Tormenta) on 5 November 2010, infightings within the Gulf Cartel triggered, and Cárdenas Vela faced problems with Jorge Eduardo Costilla Sánchez (a.k.a. El Coss) and other Gulf cartel members, who at one time worked along his uncle Osiel Cárdenas Guillén. In March 2011, Cárdenas Vela became the top drug baron in Matamoros, Tamaulipas, but fled to the Texas to seek refuge from Costilla Sánchez. According to the U.S. authorities, he was also looking for safe haven in the United States because the rival cartel of Los Zetas was tracking his whereabouts and wanted him dead. La Jornada reported on 26 October 2011 that Cárdenas Vela made several enemies within his own organization, as some cartel members grew jealous of the power he attained and of the fact that he sometimes hid in Texas while they "faced full-time heat in Mexico." Once on U.S. soil, Cárdenas Vela communicated with his subordinates through daily emails, and continued to control the drug transportation and distribution cells that trafficked cocaine and marijuana across the Mexico–United States border.

He had made more than $5 million throughout his eleven-year career as leader of the Gulf Cartel.

=== Arrest ===
On 20 October 2011, while heading to his luxury house in South Padre Island, Texas with his bodyguards and an "attractive lady," Cárdenas Vela was pulled over in Port Isabel, Texas by the police at around 6:39 p.m. on Texas State Highway 100, who were reportedly working with federal agents that had been tipped to his whereabouts. Nonetheless, The Brownsville Herald stated that the police chief of Port Isabel claimed that Cárdenas Vela was pulled over due to a "routine traffic stop" because he "was speeding." Reportedly, the officer was unaware that Cárdenas Vela was a top drug baron in the Gulf Cartel.

Cárdenas Vela was the passenger driver in a Ford F-150 silver truck with temporary license plates, and was wearing pink shorts and loafers. When he was stopped, Cárdenas Vela presented a Mexican passport and a visa name with a false name. Once confronted with his true identity, he admitted to have traveled with another man's passport, and that for years he had trafficked cocaine and marijuana to the United States. The Mexican passport he was carrying (which was under the name of a supposed Pedro García González), along with his visa, were authentic documents. According to CNN, Cárdenas Vela explicitly said that he was involved in "the transportation and importation of marijuana and cocaine into the United States for several years," and admitted to have sold five kilograms of marijuana in 2009 to people he knew were smuggling across the U.S. for further distribution. Moreover, he admitted to have crossed illegally into the United States from Mexico before being caught by the authorities.

Upon his arrest in Port Isabel, his cellphones and ledgers were confiscated by the authorities. A phone toll analysis proved his connectivity with several active and ongoing drug investigations and a ledger was also analyzed that indicated the personnel structure of the armed and unarmed individuals in the Gulf Cartel, as well as the purchase of firearms, protective equipment, automobiles and gasoline for these vehicles. No firearms, drugs, or high bulks of cash were found in his vehicle when he was taken into custody. Initial reports after his arrest stated that Cárdenas Vela had three houses in the Texan cities of Rio Hondo, Port Isabel, and Brownsville—all within 30 miles of the U.S.-Mexico border. He confessed to have dozens of vehicles, a condominium in South Padre Island, and a collections of exotic animals in his house in Rio Hondo. But none of these properties he owned in the Rio Grande Valley were under his name. On 13 December 2011, The Monitor reported that the U.S. Immigration and Customs Enforcement (ICE) was keeping track of Cárdenas Vela's location in South Texas before he was arrested, and deduced the drug lord's possible location at a ranch in Rio Hondo. When he left the ranch and headed towards South Padre Island on 20 October 2011, he was tracked down by the authorities; the ICE agency later confirmed that they had Port Isabel's police stop Cárdenas Vela on his way to the beach.

Cárdenas Vela's arrest triggered a series of road blocks and gunfights in Valle Hermoso and Matamoros, Tamaulipas, the city in which he operated. By 27 October 2011, El Universal reported a total of 14 killings as a result of his arrest and of the Gulf Cartel infighting.

==== Context of arrest ====
Stratfor and the San Antonio Express-News released a report on 3 November 2011 putting more context on the arrest of Cárdenas Vela in South Texas. They mentioned that the drug lord must have been living tough times in his position because his uncle Osiel Cárdenas Guillén is believed to have cooperated with the U.S. authorities as a protected witness. Cárdenas Vela was believed to be part of Los Rojos, a faction of the Gulf cartel that is loyal to the Cárdenas family and headed by Juan Mejía González, alias El R1. According to Stratfor, Los Rojos were under a power struggle with Los Metros, once headed by Samuel Flores Borrego (a.k.a. El Metro 3) and now headed by Jorge Eduardo Costilla Sánchez. Below is a quote of the report:

Cartels usually try to avoid conducting hits on U.S. soil, which may explain why Costilla Sanchez's faction may have tipped off U.S. authorities instead of killing him. There has not been any confirmation that Los Metros was responsible for the tip to U.S. authorities, but even if it was not, it will benefit from the hit taken by its intra-cartel rivals with the loss of their leader.

— Stratfor

The Monitor reported on 27 October 2011 that a rescue attempt for Cárdenas Vela was very unlikely. Despite being a powerful leader in the Gulf Cartel, his rude actions "burned many bridges in the organization." A source outside law enforcement but with direct knowledge of the situation stated that Cárdenas Vela was "very hardheaded and impulsive," which made him have many enemies in the organization. "(Some of the) comandantes are glad he is gone," the source said. In addition, George W. Grayson, author and professor at The College of William & Mary, that even though Cárdenas Vela was the plaza boss of Matamoros, the core network of the Gulf Cartel will remain untouched, since he was not part of the inner circle of the current syndicate boss, Jorge Eduardo Costilla Sánchez. On the other hand, Sylvia Longmire, a drug war analyst, said that Cárdenas Vela's blood relationship with Osiel Cárdenas Guillén and Antonio Cárdenas Guillén, two former leaders in the Gulf Cartel, makes the arrest a significant event.

While cartel members have been living in the United States for years, their desire to not attract attention on U.S. soil means that their behavior is different than how they operate in Mexico. According to The Monitor, several drug lords have been living in the U.S. for years, but generally do not engage in any sort of violent behavior. The last thing they want to do is attract the attention of American law enforcement officers.

== Court case ==
=== Indictment ===
On 18 November 2011, a federal Grand Jury in the city of Brownsville, Texas indicted Cárdenas Vela for managing a drug trafficking ring, laundering money, and using false Visa documents. After the arrest, he made his first court appearance the following day, and was ordered held without bond for the charges that were pending. In an effort to conceal the drug distribution, Cárdenas Vela's organization utilized vehicles which had hidden compartments to conceal all kinds of drugs. In addition, the cartel members often encoded their oral and written descriptions, along with aliases and call signs, to avoid detection. His criminal organization then distributed narcotics across the United States, including but not limited to Houston, Brownsville and McAllen, Texas. The indictment alleges that Cárdenas Vela paid law enforcement officers in Mexico for protection. He also reportedly helped oversee a network of "guardias" (guards) by keeping surveillance over the Mexican Armed Forces, law enforcement officials, and rival drug cartels.

Moreover, the indictment states that firearms are often used during drug trafficking activities; "bullet proof vehicles, automatic weapons, grenades, homemade cannons and body armor" were reportedly purchased by Cárdenas Vela and other members of the Gulf Cartel to further their drug distribution. These weapons were allegedly used by him and other cartel members to fight off Los Zetas, a rival drug cartel that fights for territorial control. The indictment concluded by stating the following:

He is charged with conspiracy to possess with intent to deliver and conspiracy to import more than five kilograms of cocaine and more than 1,000 kilograms of marijuana. For each of these two charges, he faces a mandatory minimum of 10 years up to life in prison, a fine of up to $10 million and up to five years of supervised release. Upon conviction of conspiracy to launder money, Cardenas Vela faces up to 20 years imprisonment, a fine of a maximum $500,000 or twice the amount of the money instruments or funds involved in the conspiracy, as well as a period of supervised release of up to five years. Also charged with procuring a fraudulent Mexican passport and United States Visa, he faces as additional 20 years, a $250,000 fine and five years of supervised release if convicted.

According to the U.S. authorities, Cárdenas Vela agreed to cooperate with the federal agents, just as his uncle did, for a soother life sentence.

==== First appearance in court ====
Cárdenas Vela entered the courtroom handcuffed and with his attorneys C.J. Quintanilla and Roberto J. Yzaguirre on 21 October 2011 wearing "a messy blue shirt and khaki pants." In soft-spoken Spanish, he told Judge Hanen that he was born and raised in Matamoros, Tamaulipas, and only has a middle school education. The Assistant U.S. Attorney Jody Young read a three-page document out loud from the plea agreement the drug lord had signed as factual, detailing the decade-long career Cárdenas Vela had in the Gulf Cartel. The documented stated that he had managed the distribution of cocaine and marijuana as the plaza boss in the Mexican cities of San Fernando, Río Bravo, and Matamoros. It was then stated that Cárdenas Vela had ousted José Luis Zúñiga, also known as Comandante Wicho, to become the cartel boss of Matamoros, Tamaulipas.

According to The Houston Chronicle, the court session was only available to those who were able to walk into the courthouse in Brownsville, Texas or who had subscribed to an online federal document service.

=== Guilty plea ===
On 12 March 2012, Cárdenas Vela pleaded guilty to one count of conspiracy to possess and distribute cocaine and marijuana in exchange for the government dropping money laundering and immigration charges. With this plea, prosecutors agreed to recommend that his punishment come at the lower end of the scale. But they also said that they are preparing a forfeiture order to seize the assets Cárdenas Vela, including but not limited to all-terrain vehicles, wave-runners, and a loaded Dodge Charger. Moreover, Jerry Robinette, a special agent-in-charge for ICE, said Cárdenas Vela's plea was a "successful result" of the local and federal authorities coordinating "to attack the command and control structure of the Gulf Cartel and to minimize its ability to use [the Rio Grande Valley] community as a safe haven."

The two bodyguards that were with Cárdenas Vela during his arrest – Francisco Javier Escalante Jiménez and Germán Alejandro Huízar Marroquín – were sentenced in February 2012 for lying to federal agents about the identity of Cárdenas Vela during his arrest. In Spanish, Escalante Jiménez apologized to his family, while Huízar Marroquín addressed the court and asked for the "lowest sentence possible." The third man that was in the vehicle when Cárdenas Vela was pulled over by the police on 20 October 2011 declared his true identity to the agents and remains uncharged. In addition, sources outside of law enforcement stated that Huizar Marroquín was a member of the Tamaulipas State Police. That same month, Judge Hanen put down the sentence the body guards had served.

The federal court judge Andrew S. Hanen said Cárdenas Vela's sentencing is projected for 18 June 2012.

=== Sentence ===
On 17 November 2014, Cárdenas Vela was sentenced to 20 years in prison and was ordered to pay a US$100,000 fine by U.S. District Court Judge Andrew Hanen. The sentence had previously included a forfeit of US$5 million in cash and a property in Brownsville, Texas. The drug lord admitted to smuggling large shipments of cocaine and marijuana from Mexico to the U.S. while working for the Gulf Cartel. Court records showed that Cárdenas Vela was facing life in prison. However, given his plea deal, his sentence was reduced in exchange for his cooperation with law enforcement. Part of the deal was that he had to describe the inner workings of the Gulf Cartel for federal agents.

== Family and personal life ==
Cárdenas Vela is the nephew of Osiel and Antonio Cárdenas Guillén, two former leaders of the Gulf Cartel.

He was known in the Gulf Cartel by his aliases: "El Junior," "El Comandante 900," and "El Rolex."
