= Jaime González Durán =

Mexican drug trafficker (born 1971)

- Born: 8 October 1971 (age 54); Xolmón, Aquismón, San Luis Potosí
- Other name: El Hummer
- Employers: Mexican Army (1991–1999); Gulf Cartel/Los Zetas (suspected)
- Status: Incarcerated
- Criminal charges: Murder, drug trafficking, organized crime, mercenary
- Penalty: 35 years

Jaime González Durán (a.k.a. El Hummer, born 8 October 1971) is a Mexican former drug lord who was one of the 14 original founding members and third-in-command of the criminal organization known as Los Zetas. A former Mexican Army elite soldier of the Grupo Aeromóvil de Fuerzas Especiales (GAFE), he was trained in counter-insurgency and locating and apprehending drug cartel members. At the age of 20, he joined the Armed Forces, on 15 November 1991, being accepted into the Army and Air Force with the military registration B-8987689 processed in Salinas Victoria, Nuevo León. He received specialized training by US forces and the Israeli Defense Force, integrating the Special Forces Airborne Group (GAFE), with the specialty of location, combat and apprehension of members of drug trafficking groups, but at seven years, four months and nine days of service defected as a specialized soldier, on 24 February 1999. After Osiel's arrest, González controlled a large-scale illegal drug distribution and transfer to the United States, mostly of cocaine and marijuana. He also controlled much of the illegal drug trade in the Mexican states of Nuevo León, Michoacán, Hidalgo, Veracruz, Tabasco, Quintana Roo and Mexico City. The Attorney General has cataloged him as one of the most dangerous and violent of organized crime members, and one of the most wanted by Mexican and U.S. justice.

González Durán is believed to have been responsible for the murder of narcocorridos singer Valentín Elizalde.

== Arrest ==
González was arrested on 7 November 2008 and taken into custody by Mexican Federal Police agents in Reynosa, Tamaulipas. A vast arsenal of firearms and ammunition were confiscated with his arrest. The Mexican Attorney General filed charges against him for his probable responsibility of organized crime and crimes against health. He was admitted in the maximum security federal prison Penal del Altiplano, in Almoloya de Juarez, Mexico State, where he was serving a sentence of 35 years. He was extradited from Mexico to the United States on Oct. 20, 2022.

== Kingpin Act sanction ==
On 24 March 2010, the United States Department of the Treasury sanctioned González Durán under the Foreign Narcotics Kingpin Designation Act (sometimes referred to simply as the "Kingpin Act"), for his involvement in drug trafficking along with fifty-three other international criminals and ten foreign entities. The act prohibited U.S. citizens and companies from doing any kind of business activity with him, and virtually froze all his assets in the U.S.

== See also ==
- Mexican drug war
- Mérida Initiative
