= InSight Crime =

Organized crime investigative nonprofit

- Founded: April 2010
- Type: 501(c)(3)
- Purpose: Investigative journalism
- Location(s): Washington, D.C., United States; Medellín, Colombia
- Region served: United States, Latin America, Caribbean
- Website: InSightCrime.org

InSight Crime is a non-profit think tank and media organization specializing in organized crime in Latin America and the Caribbean. The organization has offices in Washington, D.C., and Medellín, Colombia.

InSight Crime receives funding from the United States Department of State, the Swedish International Development Cooperation Agency and the Open Society Foundations. It has also worked with the Center for Latin American and Latino Studies at American University and with the Colombian think tank Fundación Ideas para la Paz.

== History ==
InSight Crime was founded in April 2010 under the endorsement of the Fundación Ideas para la Paz (FIP) in Bogotá, Colombia, and with the financial support of the Open Society Foundations. By August 2010, the Center for Latin American and Latino Studies at the American University became a sponsor.

According to the organization, it was founded in order to create an online platform that "connects the pieces, the players and organizations" involved in Latin America crime and "the effectiveness of the initiatives designed to stop them."

== Website ==
Its website intends to create an "information resource and networking tool designed for students, academics, analysts, researchers, policymakers, journalists, non-governmental workers, government officials and businesses to obtain the information and contacts they need to tackle the problems that organized crime increasingly presents in Latin America and the Caribbean."

== Consultancy ==
Apart from publishing information on its website, InSight Crime also conducts investigations across Latin America for private and government organizations.

== External funding ==
Insight Crime is funded by a mixture of government grants and corporate philanthropy.

Between 2022 and 2023, Insignt Crime received US$530,900 in grants from the Bureau of Western Hemisphere Affairs of the United States Department of State. For the period December 2023 through to June 2027, the Swedish government development agency (Sida) will fund Insight Crime US$890,410. As of 2016, Insight Crime indicated that the Open Society Foundation was a "major funder".

== See also ==
- Southern Pulse
