= Ciudad Miguel Alemán =

- City
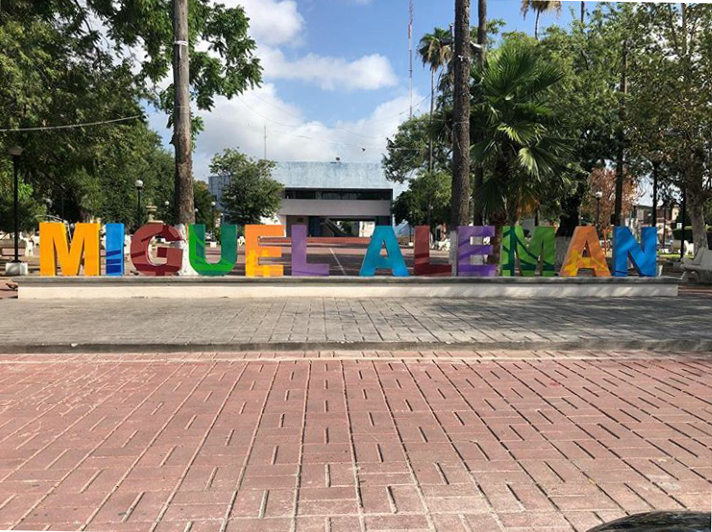
- Miguel Alemán Center

- Location within Mexico
- Coordinates: 26°24′01″N 99°01′31″W
- Country: Mexico
- State: Tamaulipas
- Municipality: Miguel Alemán Municipality
- Established: October 11, 1950

Population (2010)
  - Total: 19,997

Ciudad Miguel Alemán, known prior to 1950 as San Pedro de Roma, is a city located in Miguel Alemán Municipality, Tamaulipas, Mexico, across the Rio Grande from the U.S. city of Roma, Texas. The two are linked by the Roma – Ciudad Miguel Alemán International Bridge, a suspension bridge. As of 2010, the population of the city was 19,997. The total population of the surrounding municipality was 27,015.

== Geography ==
Ciudad Miguel Alemán is located in the northwest of the state of Tamaulipas. Its municipality shares borders with both the U.S. state of Texas and the Mexican state of Nuevo León. Within Tamaulipas, the municipality is bordered by the municipality of Camargo to the east and the municipality of Mier to the west. To the north it borders Starr County, Texas, and to the south the Municipalities of Los Aldamas and Doctor Coss in Nuevo León.

== History ==
Ciudad Miguel Alemán was founded on October 11, 1950, by decree of the State Congress of Tamaulipas, with General Raúl Gárate as the mayor of the new municipality.

The town of San Pedro de Roma was among the first in the region, but it was not until 1927, when the international bridge was constructed, that the town gained an international significance, gaining itself the title of "city" and becoming the seat of a new municipality.
