= Osiel Cárdenas Guillén =

Mexican former drug lord (born 1967)

- Cárdenas in the early 2000s
- Born: 18 May 1967 (age 59); Matamoros, Tamaulipas, Mexico
- Known for: Gulf Cartel and Los Zetas top leader
- Status: Imprisoned
- Convictions: Conspiracy to possess cocaine and marijuana with intent to distribute (21 U.S.C. §§ 841 and 846); Conspiracy to commit money laundering (18 U.S.C. § 1956); Threatening to assault and murder federal agents (18 U.S.C. §§ 2 and 115) (3 counts)
- Penalty: 25 years imprisonment

Details
- Imprisoned at: ADX Florence -> USP Florence High -> USP Lewisburg -> USP Terre Haute -> Federal Social Readaptation Center No. 1

Osiel Cárdenas Guillén (born 18 May 1967) is a former Mexican drug lord and the former top leader of the Gulf Cartel and Los Zetas.

Originally a mechanic in Matamoros, Tamaulipas, he entered the cartel by killing his friend Salvador Gómez, after the former's arrest in 1996. As confrontations with rival groups intensified, Osiel Cárdenas sought and recruited over 30 deserters from the Mexican Army, including from the Grupo Aeromóvil de Fuerzas Especiales, to form the cartel's armed wing. Los Zetas served as the hired private mercenary army of the Gulf Cartel.

After a shootout with the Mexican military in 2003, Cárdenas was arrested and imprisoned. In 2007 he was extradited to the U.S. and in 2010 he was sentenced to 25 years in prison for money laundering, drug trafficking, and for having threatened two U.S. federal agents in 1999. His brother, Mario Cárdenas Guillén, worked for the Gulf Cartel, as did another brother, Antonio Cárdenas Guillén, who was killed by Mexican Marines on 5 November 2010. Osiel Cárdenas Guillén was imprisoned at USP Terre Haute and was released on 30 August 2024. His inmate number was 62604–079. In December 2024, he was returned to Mexico and arrested. He is incarcerated in the maximum-security Altiplano prison outside Mexico City.

Osiel Cárdenas Guillén was a key architect of the Gulf Cartel's massive expansion, transforming the country's criminal dynamics with the creation of Los Zetas and laying the groundwork for the Mexican drug war.

== Arrest of García Abrego ==
Following Juan García Abrego's 1996 arrest by Mexican authorities and subsequent extradition to the United States, his brother Humberto García Abrego tried to take over the leadership of the Gulf Cartel but ultimately failed, having neither the leadership skills nor the support of the Colombian drug-provisioners. In addition, he was widely known and under surveillance; his surname alone guaranteed this. He was to be replaced by Óscar Malherbe de León and Raúl Valladares del Ángel, until their arrest a short time later. This led several cartel lieutenants to fight for the leadership. Malherbe tried to bribe officials with $2 million to obtain his release, but it was denied. Hugo Baldomero Medina Garza, known as El Señor de los Tráilers, is considered one of the most important members of the Gulf Cartel. He was one of the top cartel officials for more than 40 years, trafficking about 20 long tons (22 short tons) of cocaine to the United States each month. His luck ended in November 2000 when he was captured in Tampico, Tamaulipas and imprisoned in La Palma. After Medina Garza's arrest, his cousin Adalberto Garza Dragustinovis was investigated for allegedly forming part of the Gulf Cartel and for laundering money; this case is still open. The next in line was Sergio Gómez alias El Checo, however, his leadership was short-lived when he was assassinated in April 1996 in Valle Hermoso. After this, Cárdenas took control of the cartel in July 1999 after assassinating Salvador Gómez Herrera alias El Chava, co-leader of the Gulf Cartel and his close friend, earning his nickname Mata Amigos (Friend Killer).

== Cárdenas era and Los Zetas ==
In 1997, the Gulf Cartel began to recruit military personnel that Jesús Gutiérrez Rebollo, an army general of that time, had assigned as representatives from the Attorney General of Mexico's offices in certain states across Mexico. After his imprisonment a short time later, Jorge Madrazo Cuéllar created the National Public Security System (SNSP), to fight the drug cartels along the U.S-Mexico border. After Osiel Cárdenas took full control of the Gulf Cartel in 1999, he found himself in a no-holds-barred fight to keep his notorious organization and leadership untouched, and sought out members of the Mexican Army Special Forces to become the military armed-wing of the Gulf Cartel. His goal was to protect himself from rival drug cartels and from the Mexican military, in order to perform vital functions as the leader of the most powerful drug cartel in Mexico. Among his first contacts was Arturo Guzmán Decena, an Army lieutenant who was reportedly asked by Cárdenas to look for the "best men possible". Consequently, Guzmán Decenas deserted from the Armed Forces and brought more than 30 army deserters with him to form part of Cárdenas’ new criminal paramilitary wing. They were enticed with salaries much higher than those paid by the Mexican Army. Among the original defectors were Jaime González Durán, Jesús Enrique Rejón Aguilar, and Heriberto Lazcano, who was killed in 2012 while he was the supreme leader of Los Zetas. The creation of Los Zetas ushered in a new era of drug trafficking in Mexico. Between 2001 and 2008, the organization of the Gulf Cartel and Los Zetas was collectively known as La Compañía (The company).

One of the first missions of Los Zetas was to eradicate Los Chachos, a group of drug traffickers under the orders of the Milenio Cartel, who disputed the drug corridors of Tamaulipas with the Gulf Cartel in 2003. This gang was controlled by Dionisio Román García Sánchez alias El Chacho, who had decided to betray the Gulf Cartel and switch his alliance to the Tijuana Cartel; however, he was eventually killed by Los Zetas. Once Cárdenas consolidated his position and supremacy, he expanded the responsibilities of Los Zetas, and as years passed, they became much more important to the Gulf Cartel. They began to organize kidnappings, impose taxes, collect debts, operate protection racket, control the extortion business, secure cocaine supply and trafficking routes known as plazas (zones) and execute its foes, often with grotesque savagery. In response to the rising power of the Gulf Cartel, the rival Sinaloa Cartel established a heavily armed, well-trained enforcer group known as Los Negros. The group operated similarly to Los Zetas, but with less complexity and success. There is a circle of experts who believe that the start of the Mexican drug war did not begin in 2006 when Felipe Calderón sent troops to Michoacán to stop the increasing violence, but in 2004 in the border city of Nuevo Laredo, when the Gulf Cartel and Los Zetas fought off the Sinaloa Cartel and Los Negros.

The death of Arturo Guzmán Decena (2002), and the capture of Rogelio González Pizaña (2004), the second-in-line, marked the opportunity for Heriberto Lazcano to take charge of Los Zetas. Upon the arrest of the Gulf Cartel boss Cárdenas in 2003, and his extradition in 2007, the actions of Los Zetas changed—they began to become synonymous with the Gulf Cartel, and their influence grew within the organization. Los Zetas began to grow independently from the Gulf Cartel, and eventually a rupture occurred between them in early 2010.

== Cárdenas' standoff with U.S. agents ==
On 9 November 1999, two U.S. agents from the Drug Enforcement Administration (DEA) and Federal Bureau of Investigation (FBI) were threatened at gunpoint by Cárdenas and approximately fifteen of his henchmen in Matamoros. The two agents traveled to Matamoros with an informant to gather intelligence on the operations of the Gulf Cartel. Cárdenas demanded that the agents and the informant get out of their vehicle, but they refused to obey his orders. The incident escalated as Cárdenas threatened to kill them if they did not comply and his gunmen prepared to shoot them. The agents tried to reason with Cárdenas that killing U.S. federal agents would result in a massive manhunt by the U.S. government. Cárdenas eventually let the men go and threatened to kill them if they ever returned to his territory.

The standoff triggered a massive law enforcement effort to crack down on the leadership structure of the Gulf Cartel. Both the Mexican and U.S. governments increased their efforts to apprehend Cárdenas. Prior to the standoff, he was regarded as a minor player in the international drug trade, but this incident grew his reputation and made him one of the most-wanted criminals. The FBI and the DEA filed numerous charges against him and issued a US$2 million bounty for his arrest.

== Kingpin Act sanction ==
On 1 June 2001, the U.S. Department of the Treasury sanctioned Cárdenas under the Kingpin Act, for his involvement in drug trafficking along with eleven other international criminals. The act prohibited U.S. citizens and companies from conducting any kind of business activity with him, and virtually froze all his assets in the U.S.

== Cárdenas' arrest and extradition ==
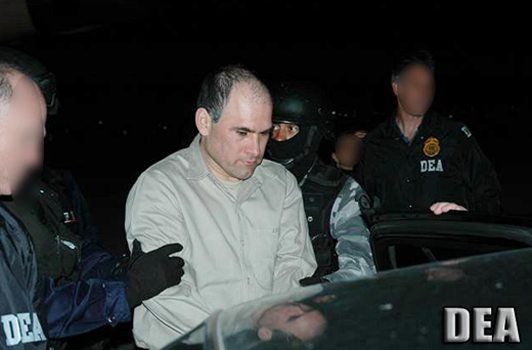
Osiel Cárdenas' extradition to the United States from Mexico.

Osiel Cárdenas Guillén was captured in the city of Matamoros, on 14 March 2003 in a shootout between the Mexican military and Gulf Cartel gunmen. He was one of the FBI Ten Most Wanted Fugitives; they were offering $2 million for his capture. According to government archives, this six-month military operation was planned and carried out in secret; the only people informed were President Vicente Fox, Mexico's Secretary of Defense Gerardo Clemente Vega, and Mexico's Attorney General, Rafael Macedo de la Concha. It is believed that he was located based on information provided by Alejandro Lucio Morales Betancourt (Z-2), Osiel Cardenas personal pilot and former Special Forces Intelligence officer who acted as Guzmán Decenas second in command who possibly turned against Osiel Cardenas after his capture in 2001. After his capture, Osiel Cárdenas was sent to the federal, high-security prison La Palma. However, it was believed that Cárdenas still controlled the Gulf Cartel from prison. He was extradited in 2007 to the United States, where he was sentenced to 25 years in a prison in Houston for money laundering, drug trafficking, homicide and death threats to U.S. federal agents. Reports from the PGR and El Universal state that while in prison, Osiel Cárdenas and Benjamín Arellano Félix, from the Tijuana Cartel, formed an alliance. Moreover, through handwritten notes, Osiel Cárdenas gave orders on the movement of drugs in Mexico and into the United States, approved executions, and signed forms to allow the purchase of police forces. And while his brother Antonio Cárdenas Guillén led the Gulf Cartel, Osiel Cárdenas still gave vital orders while in La Palma sending messages through his lawyers and guards.

The arrest and extradition of Osiel Cárdenas, however, caused several top lieutenants from both the Gulf Cartel and Los Zetas to fight over important drug corridors to the United States, especially in the cities of Matamoros, Nuevo Laredo, Reynosa, and Tampico—all situated in Tamaulipas state. They also fought for coastal cities Acapulco and Cancún; the state capital of Monterrey, and the states of Veracruz and San Luis Potosí. Using violence and intimidation, Heriberto Lazcano took control of both Los Zetas and the Gulf Cartel after Cárdenas’ extradition. Lieutenants who were once loyal to Cárdenas began following Lazcano's orders. He tried to reorganize the cartel by appointing several lieutenants to control specific territories. Morales Treviño was appointed to oversee Nuevo León; Jorge Eduardo Costilla Sánchez in Matamoros; Héctor Manuel Sauceda Gamboa, nicknamed El Karis, took control of Nuevo Laredo; Gregorio Sauceda Gamboa, known as El Goyo, along with his brother Arturo, took control of the Reynosa plaza; Arturo Basurto Peña, alias El Grande, and Iván Velásquez Caballero alias El Talibán took control of Quintana Roo and Guerrero; and Alberto Sánchez Hinojosa, alias Comandante Castillo, took over Tabasco. However, continual disagreement was leading the Gulf Cartel and Los Zetas into an inevitable rupture.

=== United States v. Cárdenas Guillén ===
In 2007, Osiel Cárdenas was extradited to the United States and charged with conspiracy to traffic large amounts of marijuana and cocaine, violating the Continuing Criminal Enterprise Statute (also known as The Kingpin Statute), and for threatening two U.S. federal officers. The standoff the two agents had with the drug lord in 1999 in the city of Matamoros led to the U.S. indicting Cárdenas and pressuring the Mexican government to capture him. In 2010 he was sentenced to 25 years in prison after being charged with 22 federal charges; the courtroom was locked and the public prevented from witnessing the proceedings. The proceedings took place in the United States District Court for the Southern District of Texas in the border city of Brownsville. Cárdenas was isolated from interacting with other prisoners at ADX Florence. He was transferred to USP Florence High, then to USP Lewisburg, and finally to USP Terre Haute.

Nearly $30 million of the former drug lord's assets were distributed among several Texas law enforcement agencies. In exchange for a 25-year sentence, he agreed to collaborate with U.S. agents in intelligence information. The U.S. federal court awarded two helicopters owned by Osiel Cárdenas to the Business Development Bank of Canada and GE Canada Equipment Financing respectively; and both of them were bought using "drug proceeds".

On 30 August 2024, US officials announced that Cárdenas had been released from prison and was now in the custody of U.S. Immigration and Customs Enforcement. In December 2024, Cárdenas was returned to Mexico and was immediately arrested and incarcerated at the maximum-security Altiplano prison outside Mexico City to face criminal charges in his home country.

== In popular culture ==
A character loosely based on Osiel Cárdenas Guillen, named "Raciel", was a major supporting character in the second season of the 2017 TV series "El Chapo".
