= Gilberto García Mena =

Mexican drug lord (born 1954)

- Born: Gilberto García Mena; June 1954 (age 71–72); Miguel Alemán, Tamaulipas, Mexico
- Other names: El June; El Yune
- Occupation: Drug lord
- Employer: Gulf Cartel
- Term: 1970s–2001
- Criminal charges: Drug trafficking; Illegal possession of firearms
- Criminal status: Convicted (Mexico); Fugitive (United States)
- Spouse: Laura Nallely Hinojosa Martínez

Gilberto García Mena (born 1954), also known as El June, is a Mexican convicted drug lord and former high-ranking member of the Gulf Cartel, a criminal group based in Tamaulipas, Mexico. He began his criminal career as a small-time marijuana smuggler in his teens, and later joined the Gulf Cartel under kingpin Juan García Ábrego. García Mena was arrested by U.S. authorities in Texas while possessing marijuana in 1984, but was released without a conviction. He returned to Mexico, and established a center of operations in Nuevo León. García Mena was arrested on drug-trafficking charges in 1989, but authorities were again unable to convict him. Released in 1990, he rejoined the Gulf Cartel.

Throughout his criminal career, García Mena cultivated a social image of a feared kingpin and a benefactor. He donated money to his community, and corrupt officials in the local police and the military facilitated his drug operations. García Mena consolidated his criminal empire by building a profitable marijuana-trafficking business with his brother and nephews, and successfully defended his turf from rival criminal groups. He befriended Osiel Cárdenas Guillén, who became the undisputed Gulf Cartel kingpin, during the late 1990s. García Mena had disagreements with other Tamaulipas-based traffickers, however, who eventually plotted his downfall.

On 6 April 2001, he was arrested by the Mexican Army after a week-long manhunt. García Mena's arrest triggered infighting within the Gulf Cartel, and prompted more offensives from the Mexican government. He was convicted of several charges, including drug trafficking and illegal possession of firearms. García Mena was released in 2014, after a court determined that his arrest violated due process. A fugitive from U.S. justice, he has a pending extradition request.

== Background and career ==
García Mena was born in 1954 in Miguel Alemán, Tamaulipas, Mexico, to Gilberto García Acevedo and Emma Mena. When García Mena was young, he excelled in school and athletics; he was fluent in English, and popular among his peers. At age eighteen García Mena became involved with Los Bravos Locos, a small drug-running gang which smuggled and sold marijuana in the U.S. Some gang members were devotees of Santa Muerte, a folk Catholic saint, and García Mena also became a devotee. He quickly ascended in the criminal underworld as an assassin and innovative smuggler and was recruited by the Gulf Cartel, a criminal group based in Tamaulipas.

García Mena rose to prominence during the 1970s by controlling the drug trade in La Frontera Chica region, which includes the U.S.-border municipalities of Miguel Alemán, Gustavo Díaz Ordaz, Camargo, Mier, and Guerrero. He worked with his brother, Juan Anacleto, and several of his nephews (who were known as Los Aerolitos). The police initially suspected that García Mena was a drug mule and car thief before he joined the Gulf Cartel. García Mena also smuggled drugs through tunnels connecting Miguel Alemán to Star County, Texas. The tunnels required advanced technology because they were dug below the Rio Grande River. García Mena bought properties on both sides of the border to ensure drugs were smuggled smoothly.

=== Early arrests ===
In 1984, he was arrested for the first time after U.S. authorities found him in possession of 454 kg (1,001 lb) of marijuana in Texas. However, García Mena was not sentenced and was released from prison thirty days after his arrest. He returned to Mexico, and resumed his criminal activities. Instead of returning to his native Tamaulipas, García Mena made Nuevo León his center of operations. Disguised as a cattle rancher, he rented a house in the Monterrey neighborhood of Colinas de San Jerónimo. Residents of the neighborhood said that García Mena was a quiet, normal neighbor; although he greeted neighbors when he arrived home, however, they thought it unusual that he was usually accompanied by a man in military uniform. According to authorities, he used Monterrey as a corridor to move drugs from other parts of Mexico (primarily Oaxaca) before they were sent to Miguel Alemán to be resold. (Note: The Gulf Cartel used multiple drug corridors across Mexico to move narcotics to Tamaulipas. Drugs from Guerrero were transported to Morelos; Mexico City; Hidalgo; Ciudad Valles, San Luis Potosí; Linares, Nuevo León; Ciudad Mante, Ciudad Victoria, and Miguel Alemán, Tamaulipas. Drugs from Michoacán were smuggled through Guanajuato, Matehuala, San Luis Potosí and Monterrey before reaching the border town of Colombia, Nuevo León. Drugs from Jalisco were moved through Zacatecas and San Luis Potosí before reaching Nuevo Laredo.) His narcotics were stored in warehouses in Colonia Central de Carga and Parque Industrial Ciudad Mitras, two neighborhoods in Guadalupe and García. When the drugs reached Tamaulipas, they were smuggled into the U.S. for further distribution. (Note: The information on García Mena's operations in Nuevo León were collected by PJF investigator Juan Carlos Laredo from his confession after he was arrested.) On 12 June 1989, the Federal Judicial Police (PJF) arrested two of García Mena's associates (Jesús López Meléndez and Germán Rodríguez Mijares) in Apodaca with 2.5 tons of marijuana. In their confessions, the men said that they were hired in Oaxaca by Octavio Leal Moncada (one of García Mena's business partners) to move the drugs to one of his ranches in Hidalgo. They identified Leal Moncada, García Mena, and the brothers Omar and Sergio Hinojosa García, as owners of the marijuana, and the PJF arrested García Mena and several of his henchmen on 14 June 1989.

Once arrested, García Mena confessed that his cousin Eusebio Guadalupe Hinojosa García and Virgilio Esquivel Cabrera were also involved in his drug operations. The other detainees identified García Mena as the lead operator, and stated that the drugs were intended to be smuggled from Miguel Alemán to the U.S. in speedboats. During his first hearing, García Mena retracted from his statements and said he was tortured by the PJF to confess he was the owner of the marijuana loads. When he was first visited by his defense lawyer Horacio Moyar Quintanilla, García said he was fine, but he later stated that he was forced to say that by the PJF. He said he was in Monterrey for an appointment with doctor Óscar Támez, and that he was arrested at his mother-in-law's house, where he was tortured and forced to sign blank papers. The judge ordered the prosecution to present evidence proving that the vehicle and the properties that were linked to the drug operation were tied to García Mena. He also ordered the doctor to appear in court and show him García Mena's medical records and appointments. The doctor appeared in court in less than 72 hours and showed the judge that García Mena did visit him for a scheduled appointment. The judge thus ordered for García Mena's release, citing torture and the doctor's appointment book as evidence of García Mena's innocence.

As García Mena stepped out of prison, he was re-arrested for other drug charges. He was transferred to Reclusorio Sur (a Mexico City penitentiary), and then re-transferred to Topo Chico in Monterrey. The lead prosecutor of the case against García Mena was Alejandro Garza Delgado. His defense argued that he was not guilty because the drugs linked to him by the prosecution were not in his possession at the time of his arrest. Although judge Rodolfo Pasarin de Luna sentenced Leal Moncada to 26 years and gave minor sentences to three detainees on 26 July 1990, he said that the evidence against García Mena was insufficient and ordered his release. The Attorney General's Office (PGR) appealed the verdict, and issued an arrest warrant for him later that year. Leal Moncada and the other detainees were also later acquitted and released from prison. García Mena returned to his native Tamaulipas and settled in Guardados de Abajo, a rural community in Camargo where he lived in a mansion for twelve years.

In 1992, the U.S. Drug Enforcement Administration (DEA) suspected that García Mena managed to smuggle 30 tons of marijuana from Mexico to Texas with the assistance of ten other gang members, including his brother Antonio. U.S. authorities issued an arrest warrant for his capture and released a US$10,000 bounty. Mexican authorities, including the PGR, requested citizens' help in locating García Mena, who was referred to in the press release by his alias "The Czar of Miguel Alemán". According to the Mexican police, García Mena was believed to be hiding in his hometown of Guardados de Abajo, and highlighted that his parents owned a property adjacent to the Rio Grande River. The PGR regarded him as one of the five most-wanted fugitives in Mexico, and believed he owned a pipe trailer company, though it was unclear if he used strawpeople to manage it. In September 1993, judge Isidro Gutiérrez González issued an arrest warrant for García Mena's capture. The judge considered that the circumstances surrounding his release were suspicious.

== Leadership ==
When García Mena became involved in drug trafficking in the 1970s, the Gulf Cartel was headed by Juan García Ábrego. García Mena defended La Frontera Chica from incursions by rival criminal groups for several years, and consolidated himself as a kingpin with manpower and a profitable marijuana-trafficking business. Groups like the Juárez Cartel (under the leadership of Amado Carrillo Fuentes), the Tijuana Cartel (under the Arellano Félix siblings), and the Sinaloa Cartel (under Héctor Luis Palma Salazar) unsuccessfully tried to take over drug-trafficking routes in the region, and decided to turn away from the drug corridors at the Tamaulipas border and focus on other drug routes in Mexico. García Mena's success gave him social acceptance and a good reputation in the criminal underworld.

After García Ábrego was arrested in 1996, the cartel experienced internal strife as several factions (and leaders) vied for control. García Mena was part of a faction opposed to groups headed by cartel leaders Ángel Salvador Gómez Herrera ("El Chava"), Adán Medrano Rodríguez ("El Licenciado"), and Hugo Baldomero Medina Garza ("El Señor de los Tráilers") for control of the drug corridors in La Frontera Chica. Control of the Gulf Cartel consolidated under Osiel Cárdenas Guillén in 1998, and García Mena began working with him with other cartel leaders involved in the unrest. He was left in charge of drug-trafficking activities in La Frontera Chica, and became one of Cárdenas Guillén's top collaborators. Cárdenas Guillén initially did not know what to call García Mena when he was appointed to the executive role; learning that García Mena was born in June and enjoyed hot weather, he began calling him "El June". (Note: Years later at his trial hearing in May 2001, García Mena said that his nickname was "El Yune", not "El June" (as the media had called him).)

García Mena met Cárdenas Guillén when the latter worked in Miguel Alemán as a PJF officer during the late 1990s, prior to becoming the leader of the Gulf Cartel. As a policeman, Cárdenas Guillén oversaw drug seizures and ran a profitable drug ring with the help of corrupt fellow officers. García Mena heard of Cárdenas Guillén's activities, and approached him for a meeting; they got along well, and became trusted business partners. Cárdenas Guillén helped keep García Mena's turf free from rival drug gangs, and gave him drugs to resell which had been seized by the police. García Mena gave some of the profits to Cárdenas Guillén, who gave them to his collaborators in the police. Their partnership strengthened with time; Cárdenas Guillén was romantically involved with Adriana García García, García Mena's niece. (Note: Adriana had a sister named Aidé (sometimes spelled Aydee or Aydé). They were known as Las Cuatas (the Twins); Aidé was romantically involved with Javier Antonio Quevedo Guerrero, the military man convicted of protecting García Mena.) Adriana worked at the PJF offices in Miguel Alemán, and helped Cárdenas Guillén with leaked law-enforcement information. García Mena supported their relationship, and gave Cárdenas Guillén free rein in Miguel Alemán's drug-trafficking activities. Cárdenas Guillén eventually became the head of the Gulf Cartel, and García Mena worked under him.

== Influence and downfall ==
According to federal sources, García Mena was protected by local police, politicians, and the military. Investigators believe that García Mena was allowed to conduct drug-trafficking activities with relative impunity by these corrupt officers. In 1997, he recruited several military members who were stationed in Miguel Alemán to combat drug-trafficking groups in the region; among them were Arturo Guzmán Decena and Heriberto Lazcano Lazcano, two military officers who were his bodyguards. (Note: After García Mena was arrested in 2001, Cárdenas Guillén hired the military officers who worked under him. They formed a group called Los Zetas, which served as the Gulf Cartel's paramilitary squad.) García Mena's legal team advised him to hire mercenaries because illegal possession of firearms was considered a more serious crime than drug trafficking at that time. On 14 January 2000, García Mena was accused of collaborating with three military members based in Tamaulipas: General Ricardo Martínez Perea, Infantryman Javier Antonio Quevedo Guerrero, and Captain Pedro Maya Díaz. The report, which was issued anonymously to the Secretariat of National Defense (SEDENA), provided details of García Mena's use of the military for his drug-trafficking activities. (Note: All three military men were found guilty of protecting García Mena and sentenced to 15 years in prison in 2003.)

The military men were accused of allowing the Gulf Cartel to move drugs from Tamaulipas to the U.S. and notifying them of law-enforcement presence by sharing their communications equipment. In return, García Mena provided them with information on drug shipments by rival gangs for the military to seize. The prosecution thought it suspicious that multiple drug seizures on García Mena's turf under Martínez Perea's tenure occurred without arrests. The former mayors of Miguel Alemán and Camargo, Raúl Rodríguez Barrera ("El Chupón") and Lorenzo Ramírez Díaz, respectively, were also accused of protecting the Gulf Cartel. Rodríguez Barrera reportedly met García Mena in 1997, when the mayor worked for the PJF in Reynosa and Ciudad Victoria. García Mena reportedly met him several times at horse-racing events at Las Bugambilias, a ranch owned by his lead smuggler Edelio López Falcón ("El Yeyo"). Rodríguez Barrera and García Mena appeared together in several videos and photographs with other senior Gulf Cartel members; (Note: The Mexican government had three videos from García Mena's daughter's quinceañera. Rodríguez Barrera also appeared in videos with Osiel Cárdenas Guillén. In his defense, the mayor said that he appeared in many pictures as a politician and did not know at the time that García Mena was involved in organized crime.) Ramírez Díaz was the cousin of Mario Ramírez ("La Gata") and Eduardo Ramírez ("El Pollo"), two of García Mena's chief collaborators in La Frontera Chica.

García Mena was seen as a folk hero and a quasi-mythical figure by many residents of Guardados de Abajo. Part of his social image stemmed from his roles as benefactor and kingpin. According to local residents, he provided jobs, services and investment, and was feared and respected by local law enforcement. Residents said that García Mena bought medicine for the sick, brought people to the hospital as needed, provided jobs at his ranch, helped build a school and a church, distributed Christmas presents, paid for funerals and Holy Week vacations, and funded road-paving and access to potable water. They described him as a practicing Catholic who attended mass every Sunday and received communion. This perspective was at odds with the Mexican government's view of García Mena. (Note: Federal authorities were unaware of García Mena's public image until they carried out operations in Guardados de Abajo in 2001 to apprehend him.) Authorities suspected him of masterminding 15 homicides, including that of Reynosa PJF commander Jaime Rajid Gutiérrez Arreola. According to an anonymous police officer with knowledge of García Mena's homicide cases, García Mena was not an aggressive crime boss and was generally level-headed. The officer said that García Mena preferred to keep the peace and avoid a commotion.

García Mena had a large group of henchmen in Tamaulipas, and one of his closest associates was López Falcón. Although they worked together smuggling drugs into the U.S. from Tamaulipas, they began having differences in the late 1990s. The differences began after López Falcón began diversifying the Gulf Cartel's portfolio and began smuggling cocaine into the U.S. from Tamaulipas. García Mena sided with Cárdenas Guillén to oust López Falcón, which forced López Falcón to seek support from other organized-crime members tied to rival drug cartels. López Falcón and his enforcer, Rolando López Salinas ("El Rolis"), met with members of the Sinaloa Cartel and brokered a drug deal without the Gulf Cartel's approval during the summer of 2000. (Note: Years earlier, López Salinas and García Mena had a disagreement over control of turf. López Salinas reportedly sought protection from the Sinaloa Cartel after criminal groups from southern Mexico wanted him killed for a drug debt.) They eventually left the Gulf Cartel and joined the Sinaloa Cartel, which promised him larger profits in exchange for allowing them to smuggle drugs in Tamaulipas. This prompted García Mena and the Gulf Cartel to fully cut ties with them. At that time, the Sinaloa Cartel operated as a triangle organization and held an alliance with the Milenio Cartel and Juárez Cartel, two other criminal groups in Mexico that rivaled the Gulf Cartel. García Mena relied on Cárdenas Guillén's forces to kill López Falcón and López Salinas. In turn, López Falcón reportedly opted for a new strategy: reaching out to authorities and providing them with information on García Mena's whereabouts.

== Manhunt ==
The Gulf Cartel was under close scrutiny after several of its members threatened two U.S. agents at gunpoint in Matamoros in 1999; the incident drew attention to its leadership, which included García Mena. The first major breakthrough about the Gulf Cartel's leadership under Cárdenas Guillén occurred after the arrest of Medina Garza on 1 November 2000, which led to information on García Mena. In early 2001, García Mena and six accomplices were arrested on a highway in Tamaulipas, but he was released hours later by order of Martínez Pérez. From 31 March to 10 April 2001 about 300 soldiers from the Mexican Army and personnel from the Special Prosecutor's Office For Crimes Against Health (FEADS) were stationed in Camargo to crack down on the Gulf Cartel's operations in the area. The crackdown, headed by PGR chief José Luis Santiago Vasconcelos, (Note: The Tamaulipas State Police also provided support for García Mena's arrest, headed by police chief Luis Eduardo Rodríguez Masso.) yielded major developments against García Mena's operations. On 2 April, authorities arrested 21 members of the cartel in Guardados de Abajo. (Note: Two were released; one because he was a minor, and the other became a protected witness. The 19 other detainees are listed in the source.) The PGR confirmed that García Mena had nearly been captured, escaping seven minutes before the police reached his location. Mexican authorities reached out to the United States Federal Bureau of Investigation (FBI) and the DEA for assistance, since they suspected García Mena of fleeing to the U.S. They seized 12 tons of marijuana at the home of Juan de Dios Hinojosa Moreno, one of García Mena's top lieutenants in Guardados de Abajo, on 4 April. (Note: Juan de Dios Hinojosa was known as "El Mocho" and "El Cuatro Dedos", and the reported number of marijuana packages seized varied between 1,069 and 1,950. He was sentenced to 24 years in prison in 2008.)

The military also raided the homes of Zeferino Peña Cuéllar (head of the Miguel Alemán Municipal Police and alleged Gulf Cartel operator), and García Mena's brother Juan Anacleto; a number of firearms were seized from both houses. On 6 April, the military intercepted a phone call in which García Mena asked his associates for clothing so he could leave Guardados de Abajo (where he was suspected of hiding). The army reinforced surveillance in surrounding towns to prevent him from fleeing, and raided three more houses in Guardados de Abajo the following day in search of him. They and the Mexican Air Force conducted air and land surveillance in the adjacent rural communities of Guardados de Arriba, Carrizales, Rancherías, Los Ángeles, and Comales, discovering a clandestine airstrip in Camargo presumably used by the Gulf Cartel for their drug operations. The PGR confirmed on 6 April that they were investigating at least ten military officers in Tamaulipas protecting and supporting the cartel.

=== Re-arrest ===
Although soldiers raided García Mena's home in Guardados de Abajo with a search warrant, they were unable to locate him for several days and his family continued to access it. Authorities believed that it was a safe house for his operations, and discovered several government-issued IDs from the State of Mexico and Guerrero in his name with different photographs and addresses. (Note: Authorities discovered that García Mena had five bank accounts in Guerrero in which he deposited large sums of money. At other Guardados de Abajo properties, they found documents detailing payments received by smugglers for trafficking marijuana to the U.S.) After several fruitless days, the PGR decided to return García Mena's home to his mother. However, the army discovered a hidden compartment behind a bedroom wardrobe a few hours before they were going to leave the house. They noted the wardrobe had an electrical switch, and because they thought the location was unusual they decided to investigate, finding a cupboard wall which covered the entrance to the small room.

García Mena was hiding in the room, and was arrested by the army's Special Forces Airmobile Group (GAFE) at 12:20 p.m. on 9 April 2001. Although authorities were prepared to use force, García Mena (who was alone) was arrested without incident. He was in possession of a portable oxygen tank, a mobile phone, a radio-communication device, five firearms, food and cleaning supplies, and an altar and paraphernalia of the Santa Muerte. (Note: The PGR showed the media the Santa Muerte paraphernalia found at the house. This was the first recorded incident of members of the Gulf Cartel being Santa Muerte devotees.) The weapons, which included three .38 pistols, one .22 pistol and a German-made Heckler & Koch MP5 submachine gun, allowed the soldiers to arrest García Mena in flagrante delicto. The soldiers were particularly alarmed by his MP5 and .38 weapons; the MP5 is a military-exclusive weapon in Mexico, and civilian possession is a violation of federal law. García Mena was wearing one of the .38s on his waist when he was arrested, and admitted in custody that it was his. His four handguns had "El Coronel" insignia, which reportedly indicated the factory in which they were made. The weapons were not from a Mexican arms provider, and the PGR suspected that they originated in Colombia. The PGR did not confirm to the press if they would investigate links between García Mena's faction and Colombian drug-trafficking groups.

PGR chief José Luis Santiago Vasconcelos said at a press conference that although García Mena's arrest was a significant blow to the Gulf Cartel, it continued to operate across Mexico. The PGR confirmed that Cárdenas Guillén was the main target of their law-enforcement operations, they were close to arresting him, and were going after other high-ranking Gulf Cartel leaders. (Note: The Gulf Cartel leaders listed as fugitives were Osiel Cárdenas Guillén, José Manuel Garza Rendón, Adán Medrano Rodríguez, Rogelio García García, Víctor Manuel Vázquez Mireles, Juan Carlos de la Cruz Reyna, Jorge Eduardo Costilla Sánchez, and Baldomero González Ruiz.) They emphasized that García Mena's arrest was significant, but the Gulf Cartel was not close to being dismantled; the other cartel leaders were similar in rank. According to the PGR, the operation leading to García Mena's Guardados de Abajo arrest also yielded 127 firearms; four hand grenades; 2,134 marijuana packages, weighing more than 20 tons; 20 kg (44 lb) of marijuana seeds; 52 vehicles and 18 houses, of which 10 remained under federal jurisdiction. The government called it one of Tamaulipas' largest weapons seizures.

García Mena's arrest marked a shift in how the Mexican government confronted drug cartels. President Vicente Fox of the National Action Party (PAN), who ousted the dominant Institutional Revolutionary Party (PRI) in 2000, abandoned a passive approach to the cartels and led aggressive crackdowns on them. Fox relied heavily on the Mexican Armed Forces in counter-narcotics efforts, increasing the military's role in enforcing civilian law and conducting intelligence. (Note: Fox's decision to use the military against drug cartels was criticized by others in the federal government, who said that using the military would expose it to corruption and loss of reputation.) His efforts in apprehending García Mena were recognized by the U.S. government, who highlighted it as evidence of increasing multilateral collaboration between law-enforcement agencies in both countries. On 20 April 2001, PGR head Rafael Macedo de la Concha met with DEA administrator Donnie R. Marshall. Marshall praised the Mexican government for García Mena's arrest, saying that it indicated that Mexico was committed to fighting corruption. García Mena was wanted by the U.S. government for drug trafficking, and was the subject of a pending extradition request.

==== Government response ====
On 12 April 2001, the Tamaulipas State Police and federal agents reinforced Camargo and Miguel Alemán to prevent criminals from fleeing Tamaulipas for Nuevo León. The plan consisted of surveillance on highways connecting Tamaulipas with Nuevo León to prevent the flow of drugs. The Nuevo León State Police, the army and the PGR sent additional troops to the municipalities of Los Aldamas, Los Ramones, China and General Bravo to improve security. On 26 April, the PGR said that they would increase the law-enforcement presence in Tamaulipas and Veracruz with additional army troops and would not rely on the Federal Preventive Police (PFP). The decision was made after the PGR obtained new evidence from García Mena's arrest and prioritized the arrests of Cárdenas Guillén and Humberto García Ábrego. The increased surveillance in Miguel Alemán and Camargo forced several traffickers to flee and leave some rural communities in near abandonment. Local residents worried that with García Mena's capture, their communities would suffer economic hardship (specifically García Mena's laborers who worked at his properties). Municipal authorities countered these statements by saying that their communities had other means of economic production besides drug trafficking.

In response to police-corruption allegations during García Mena's tenure, the government of Tamaulipas laid off 76 state police officers and 35 rural officers based in La Frontera Chica. The layoffs included a number of police chiefs suspected of protecting García Mena. The decision was requested by the PGR to investigate police involvement in organized crime. (Note: Seventy-five percent of the laid-off police were reinstated on 30 June 2001 after they proved their innocence in court, and they were transferred to Tampico, Tamaulipas.) Between 2 and 6 June 2001, the Specialized Unit Against Organized Crime (UEDO, a former branch of the PGR) cracked down on the Gulf Cartel in Miguel Alemán, Ciudad Mier, Camargo and Reynosa with support from the PJF and the army. The UEDO had intelligence confirming the whereabouts of García Mena's associates José Manuel Garza Rendón ("La Brocha"), Medrano, and Cárdenas Guillén. However, the men escaped capture when security forces were delayed in obtaining search warrants and finalizing details of the raids. The raids were headed by PGR chief Santiago Vasconcelos, and the PGR said that security forces were closing in on cartel leaders and their arrests were imminent.

Troops stationed in La Frontera Chica on 5 June 2001 conducted a number of raids in search of Alesio García Peña ("El Huarachón"), one of García Mena's henchmen and a suspected successor. Although two of his properties in Ciudad Mier were raided, they were unable to locate him. The Army also set up a checkpoint in front of López Falcón's ranch, without raiding it; however, they raided one of García Mena's ranches and seized 345 kg (761 lb) of marijuana at a property in Guardados de Abajo. The PGR confirmed that the drugs were not tied to the trafficker for whom they were searching, and one person was arrested in the operation. The military also raided San Manuel, a ranch owned by García Mena's parents in Miguel Alemán, and confiscated two weapons. The operation lasted less than a day, and the federal troops returned to their barracks before midnight.

On 26 June 2001, the Mexican government sent 200 troops to Tamaulipas in continued efforts against the Gulf Cartel. They mounted a checkpoint at Guardados de Abajo's only entrance, searching vehicles entering and leaving the town, and patrolled by car and on foot. García Mena's house was not raided. The military left Guardados de Abajo on 28 July.

==== Civilian and organized-crime reactions ====
The power vacuum left by García Mena's arrest triggered violence in northeastern Mexico and led to leadership changes in the Gulf Cartel. The PGR confirmed that García Mena's arrest did not reduce Gulf Cartel operations. Under him, the cartel had developed an organizational structure made up of criminal cells; the cells had regional leaders, and carried out criminal activities for the cartel. They often shared resources with other cells, including vehicles, routes, corrupt public officials, weapons and gunmen. The cell controlled by García Mena was one of the cartel's largest. In addition, the law-enforcement operations in Guardados de Abajo discomfited local residents (who called the crackdown excessive), a number of whom filed complaints with the National Human Rights Commission (CNDH). Some of the complaints cited forced disappearances. Amnesty International stated that CNDH officials reported that the military broke into people's houses and arbitrarily detained several residents; some of them were reportedly subject to torture and death threats.

On 13 May 2001, several gunmen (presumably on García Mena's orders) stormed an arena in Guadalupe to kill López Falcón. According to investigators, García Mena believed that López Falcón betrayed him by giving authorities information on his whereabouts. On 30 October 2001, García Mena's henchmen attempted to kill López Falcón associate Peña Cuellar in Monterrey for allegedly providing authorities information leading to his arrest. (Note: Other reasons for the attempted murder were proposed by law enforcement; one suggestion was that García Mena discovered that Peña had betrayed him, not López Falcon. Another suggests that López Falcón may have ordered the attack on Peña for attempting to frame him.) Félix Alonso Fernández García, a journalist from Miguel Alemán, was murdered by unknown assailants on 19 January 2002. According to investigators, Fernández had accused mayor Rodríguez Barrera of supporting García Mena and traffickers based in La Frontera Chica. The journalist's bodyguards confirmed to police that Fernández had hired them after receiving death threats from the mayor. The perpetrators were never arrested, but investigators discovered cocaine in Fernández's vehicle (suggesting that he may have been involved in drug trafficking). On 31 October 2012, Rodríguez Barrera was murdered by gunmen as he entered his home in Miguel Alemán. He was under investigation in the U.S. for his alleged role in homicide and drug trafficking.

== Imprisonment ==
After his arrest, García Mena was flown to Mexico City by Air Force personnel and taken into custody at the PGR facility in Mexico City. He was imprisoned at the Federal Social Readaptation Center No. 1 ("Altiplano"), a maximum-security prison in Almoloya de Juárez, State of Mexico, on 10 April 2001. García Mena was escorted by about 100 soldiers and state police. Initially charged with drug trafficking, organized-crime involvement and illegal possession of military-exclusive firearms, he was assigned to judge Antonio González García from Toluca, State of Mexico. The other men arrested in Guardados de Abajo the week that García Mena entered custody were charged with the same crimes.

On 9 May 2001, medical staff from La Palma gave him a personality test in which he admitted being involved in drug trafficking. García Mena walked investigators through his criminal background and gave them details of his past activities, including his introduction to the drug trade by his brother and his partnership with Cárdenas Guillén. He said that he had been involved in marijuana trafficking, but retired from that activity two years before his arrest. García Mena insisted that the narcotics seized in Guardados de Abajo during the operation leading to his arrest were not his, and he was a victim of defamation because of his previous activities. He told investigators that the narcotics belonged to his nephew, José Fernando Guerra García, a successor to the family business.

In 2003, several prison guards confirmed that García Mena was housed with sixty-nine other inmates in Module 8, Section 2-B of Altiplano. The module also housed other high-ranking organized-crime figures, including Luis Amezcua Contreras, Jesús Labra Avilés, Óscar Malherbe de León, Hugo Baldomero Medina Garza, Miguel Caro Quintero, Alcides Ramón Magaña, Jesús Amezcua Contreras, Jesús Albino Quintero Meraz and Ismael Higuera Guerrero. In the module, García Mena was allowed four hours of recreation daily. The guards reported that despite his high profile, García Mena did not receive special treatment and ate the same food as the other inmates.

== Trial ==
=== First year ===
García Mena was defended during his trial by a number of different attorneys, including Juan Jesús Guerrero Chapa, Francisco Flores Iruegas, Jesús Solano Sánchez, and Américo Delgado de la Peña. He denied his firearms charges on 12 April 2001, but did not comment on the drug-trafficking and organized-crime-involvement charges since they were pending confirmation by a judge. On 17 April, judge José Ángel Mattar Oliva in Toluca charged García Mena with illegal possession of military-exclusive firearms. The judge dropped a charge of carrying a firearm when he was arrested, since it was not proven by the prosecution. In accordance with Mexican law, since García Mena was arrested at his home the weapons charges were split into two indictments. That day, he was also charged by Toluca-based judge Leopoldo Cerón Tinajero with organized-crime involvement and drug trafficking. The judge said that he was considering moving the case to a federal court in Tamaulipas for jurisdictional reasons. Cerón had transferred several suspects in García Mena's case to Tamaulipas because it had a maximum-security prison (like Altiplano), and the crimes had been committed in that state. The request was denied three months later, after a court ordered García Mena to be tried in Toluca.

On 25 April 2001, the Congress of Tamaulipas unanimously agreed to order state attorney general Eduardo Garza Rivas to appear before legislators and speak about corruption allegations in the Tamaulipas State Police. After García Mena's arrest, the PGR began an investigation of police officers allegedly involved in Gulf Cartel operations. The investigation originated from videos and photographs found at García Mena's home linking him to mayor Rodríguez Barrera. (Note: When the existence of the photographs and videos were made public, rumors surfaced that other Tamaulipas officials were implicated. However, the PGR said that only Rodríguez Barrera was involved.) Garza Rivas said that there were no clear indications of state-official collusion with the Gulf Cartel, but agreed to collaborate with the investigation. The congress stated that they would request access to the PGR's videos and photographs; because the files were in the possession of a federal agency, the congress required PGR approval. That day, the PGR confirmed that they were also investigating Nuevo León attorney general José Santos González Suárez and deputy attorney general César Cantú García for possible ties to García Mena. (Note: On 24 April 2001, both resigned from their government positions.) According to PGR head Rafael Macedo de la Concha, every public official related to García Mena's case would be asked to appear at the attorney general's offices for questioning; this included federal officials and members of the military.

On 1 May 2001, the Public Registry of Property and Commerce (RPPC) said that the PGR had not issued them a judicial order to seize García Mena's properties. In order to take ownership of his properties, the PGR had to get approval from a judge. On 21 May, Mattar Oliva charged García Mena with drug possession and marijuana transportation (pending charges against him in the state of Guerrero). The judge dismissed an additional drug-transportation charge. According to the PGR witness Arnulfo Garza Silva, García Mena offered him US$2 million to move drugs from Zihuatanejo to Miguel Alemán. However, the judge rejected his testimony because of his description of García Mena as a light-skinned man in his twenties (which did not match his age and complexion).

On 26 July 2001, his defense team registered a complaint against Cerón that the judge was unfair to their client. According to the team, Cerón did not carefully weigh the evidence against García Mena and swiftly convicted him of organized-crime involvement and illegal possession of firearms. García Mena complained that an unnamed member of the court prevented him from speaking with his attorneys during a hearing, violating his constitutional rights. On 3 October 2001, a State of Mexico court charged García Mena with organized-crime involvement, illegal possession of military-exclusive firearms, drug trafficking, providing financial support to drug-trafficking activities, and for having a supervisory and promotional role in drug-trafficking activities. The court acquitted him of marijuana trafficking and transportation, but said that he would remain in prison on the other charges.

=== Following years ===
García Mena's defense appealed the use of protected witnesses at the trial on 4 November 2002, saying that protected witnesses were used unfavorably by the prosecution. His defense asked judge José Manuel Quintero Montes on 28 November to move his case to a court in Nuevo León, because their client had a pending 1989 charge in Monterrey which was linked to one of his charges in the State of Mexico. PGR prosecutor Otilia Moreno Ramirez appealed the defense's transfer request, saying that a transfer to a Nuevo León prison would pose a security threat and a flight risk. According to the PGR, the pending Monterrey charge was unrelated to his State of Mexico charges. Ninfa Delia Domínguez Leal, the former head of Nuevo León's state penitentiaries, said that García Mena's transfer was unlikely to be approved because Nuevo León did not have a maximum-security prison. The defense request was denied by a federal court, and García Mena remained in Altiplano.

On 3 March 2003, a State of Mexico court dropped six of the seven drug charges after deciding that the prosecution had not proven its case. According to the court, the prosecution only proved marijuana possession; the PGR claims that García Mena was guilty of knowingly reinvesting drug proceeds and of drug trafficking with intent to sell, distribute, import, and export were unproven. Although the prosecution tried to have it reviewed, the court confirmed that the decision was final. García Mena remained imprisoned in Altiplano because he had a pending drug-trafficking charge in Nuevo León and a firearms charge in the State of Mexico. Federal authorities raided an alcohol business owned by García Mena's sister, Evangelina, in Miguel Alemán on 22 May as a suspected money-laundering front.

Federal authorities announced on 13 January 2005 that they were going to question García Mena for the murder of Sinaloa Cartel member Arturo Guzmán Loera ("El Pollo"), who was executed by an Altiplano inmate. According to investigators, they would also question Cárdenas Guillén and Tijuana Cartel leader Benjamín Arellano Félix. Although it was initially suspected that the murder was ordered by the Gulf Cartel leadership, investigators later concluded that it was planned by the Juárez Cartel as revenge for the murder of clan member Rodolfo Carrillo Fuentes the year before. On 15 January, García Mena's defense issued a recurso de amparo in a Toluca court to prevent their client from being transferred to another Mexican prison (the government was transferring groups of high-profile criminals due to strikes and murders in Altiplano). García Mena's defense alleged that the transfer would ensure poor treatment and keep him in solitary confinement. On 18 January, a court confirmed that he would remain in Altiplano.

== Convictions ==
On 30 May 2003, García Mena was found guilty of illegal possession of military-exclusive firearms and was sentenced to eight years in prison. His organized-crime involvement and drug trafficking were pending when he was convicted, and he also had charges pending in Matamoros and Toluca. At trial, García Mena was deemed a criminal of mid-tier menace but he was denied several legal benefits because of the seriousness of his conviction. He was also fined MXN$4,500. Prosecutor Carlos Javier Vega Memije said that the PGR were unhappy because the court did not include his drug-trafficking and organized-crime-involvement charges in the conviction, and would appeal the decision.

On 30 June 2003, (Note: According to another source, the date was 17 June 2003.) State of Mexico judge Andrés Pérez Lozano charged García Mena with money laundering – specifically, with conspiracy to invest and acquire properties with illegal funds. The charge originated from an investigation which began in Tamaulipas on 22 April; García Mena bought a ranch to grow sorghum and other agricultural plants, a country estate with an event center and two houses, and deposited funds in multiple bank accounts. Investigators said that García Mena used his wife, Laura Nallely Hinojosa Martínez, as a strawperson. (Note: Their son, Gilberto García Hinojosa ("El Junito"), was also suspected by law enforcement of Gulf Cartel involvement.) According to the indictment, García Mena laundered MXN$19.7 million and nearly US$50,000. Peña Cuellar was also indicted along with García Mena and his wife. On 2 November 2003, Hinojosa Martínez accused the GAFE of illegally raiding her home and destroying personal property. On 30 July 2004, an association of ranchers in Tamaulipas notified the court that García Mena was not a registered member; his defense had claimed that García Mena was a businessman and rancher to demonstrate that he was not involved in drug trafficking.

On 19 April 2007, a Nuevo León court sentenced him to 16 years and one month in prison for possession and transportation of six tons of marijuana. This charge was part of the pending 1989 investigation in Nuevo León. On 1 September 2007, State of Mexico judge Octavio Bolaños Valadez sentenced García Mena to 54 years and nine months in prison for organized-crime involvement, illegal possession of military-exclusive firearms, and drug trafficking. The drug-trafficking charge was marijuana possession with intent to distribute. He was also ordered to pay MXN$549,244 (approximately US$48,600 in 2007) in fines. Four of García Mena's associates were also found guilty of the same charges, and received 19 to 33 years in prison.

On 1 March 2008, State of Mexico judge Rafael Zamudio Arias reduced García Mena's sentence to 43 years and nine months for drug trafficking and illegal possession of military-exclusive firearms after his defense appealed the sentence. The Federal Judicature Council (CJF) said that the court had confirmed that he was a drug-trafficking leader in Guardados de Abajo and responsible for safeguarding marijuana loads through his associates. The court also found four of García Mena's associates guilty of drug trafficking and/or illegal possession of military-exclusive firearms, and sentenced them to 15 to 24 years in prison. García Mena was ordered to pay MXN$281,925 in fines. He requested a recurso de amparo in 2010, saying that he was subject to torture and negligence while receiving medical attention.

=== Release and aftermath ===
State of Mexico judge Carlos Sáinz Martínez overturned García Mena's March 2008 conviction on 21 January 2014, ruling that the property raids which led to his 2001 arrest did not meet all the requirements of Article 16 of the Constitution of Mexico and Article 61 of the Federal Criminal Procedure Code. The court also determined that one person who testified against García Mena was questioned by an unqualified person, making his evidence inadmissible. This decision was made after García Mena's defense appealed his conviction, saying that his right to due process was violated when he was arrested. He was released from prison because his arrest was determined to have violated Mexican federal law. The other detainees who were arrested and convicted for collaborating with García Mena in 2001 were also expected to appeal their convictions.

On 29 May 2014, the U.S. District Court for the Southern District of Texas (S.D. Tex.) indicted 16 suspected members of the Gulf Cartel who operated a marijuana ring in south Texas and the greater Houston area. Among those indicted was a man listed as Gilberto Mena García ("El Yune"), who was described as a Mexican national in his sixties, but the prosecution did not confirm if he was García Mena. According to the DEA and Homeland Security Investigations (HSI), who headed the investigation, the suspects were involved in a conspiracy with intent to distribute 1,000 kg (2,200 lb) of marijuana. If convicted, Mena García faces 10 years to life imprisonment and US$4 million in fines. He was also charged with drug possession with intent to distribute 100 kg (220 lb), which carries penalties of 5 to 40 years in prison and US$2 million in fines. The proceeds of the marijuana operation were used to buy properties in the Texas counties of Hidalgo, Starr, and Montgomery.

== Family ==
García Mena is the uncle of Samuel García, a politician who was elected as governor of Nuevo León in 2021.

== See also ==
- Mexican drug war

== Bibliography ==
- Ravelo, Ricardo (2012). Osiel: Vida y tragedia de un capo (in Spanish). Penguin Random House. ISBN 978-6073107716.
- Gómez, María Idalia; Fritz, Darío (2005). Con la muerte en el bolsillo: seis desaforadas historias del narcotráfico en México (in Spanish). Planeta Group. ISBN 978-9703700271.
- Brook, John Lee (2016). Blood+death: The Secret History of Santa Muerte and the Mexican Drug Cartels. SCB Distributors. ISBN 978-1909394223.
- Cedillo, Juan Alberto (2018). Las guerras ocultas del narco (in Spanish). Penguin Random House. ISBN 978-6073171038.
- Osorno, Diego Enrique (2011). El cártel de Sinaloa (in Spanish). Penguin Random House. ISBN 978-6073102346.
- Valdés Castellanos, Guillermo (2013). Historia del narcotráfico en México (in Spanish). Penguin Random House. ISBN 978-6071127129.
- Editorial Posada (2001). Boletín mexicano de la crisis (in Spanish). Mexico City: Editorial Posada. OCLC 33979670.
- Nicaso, Antonio; Lamothe, Lee (2005). Angels, mobsters & narco-terrorists: the rising menace of global criminal empires. Wiley. ISBN 0470835184.
- Almazán, Alejandro (2001). "'El June' combinaba ceremonias paganas con catolicismo". Línea privada (in Spanish). Vol. 436–446. Agencia Informativa Tamaulipas. OCLC 31864071.
- Ambrosi, Ana Paula; Zárate, Silvia D.; Saragoza, Alex M. (2012). Mexico Today: An Encyclopedia of Life in the Republic: An Encyclopedia of Life in the Republic. ABC-CLIO. ISBN 978-0313349492. OCLC 318420872.
