= Luis Alberto Guerrero Reyes =

Mexican drug lord

- Born: Luis Alberto Guerrero Reyes
- Died: 10 May 2004; Matamoros, Tamaulipas, Mexico
- Cause of death: Gunshot wounds
- Other names: Z-5; Z12-HK44; El Guerrero
- Employers: Mexican Army (1987–1999); Los Zetas (suspected)
- Criminal charges: Murder; Drug trafficking
- Criminal status: Deceased
- Spouse: Jovanna Lizbeth Melchor Ceballos (wife)
- Partner: Erica Edith González (girlfriend)

Luis Alberto Guerrero Reyes (died 10 May 2004) was a Mexican suspected drug lord and high-ranking member of Los Zetas, a criminal group based in Tamaulipas, Mexico. He joined the Mexican Army in 1987, specializing in explosives, martial arts and grenade launchers. In 1999, he deserted the military and joined the Gulf Cartel under kingpin Osiel Cárdenas Guillén, becoming one of the first members of its newly formed paramilitary wing, Los Zetas. Like Guerrero Reyes, most of the first members of Los Zetas were ex-military. Los Zetas was responsible for providing security services to Cárdenas Guillén and carrying out executions on the cartel's behalf.

Guerrero Reyes was a suspect in multiple murders, including those of his girlfriend and wife. Investigators suspect he was part of the commando group that assassinated kingpin Edelio López Falcón. Guerrero Reyes was also an instructor to new Zetas members, training them in combat and counter-insurgency. In 2004, he was killed in a drive-by shooting by unknown assailants along with four other people after he left a discotheque in Matamoros. His murder remains unsolved; it is not known if he was killed by his own cartel or by a rival criminal organization.

== Early life and career ==
Guerrero Reyes joined the Mexican Army on 1 March 1987, as an infantry soldier in the 70th Infantry Battalion. From 11 April to 17 June 1989, he served as a paratrooper in the Parachute Rifle Brigade (BFP). In the BFP, he became a specialist in explosives, martial arts and grenade launchers. Guerrero Reyes was promoted to the rank of corporal in the infantry division on 1 November 1990 and was assigned to lead a small squadron of five soldiers. On 1 March 1992, he was promoted to second degree sergeant. Guerrero Reyes reportedly received military and counter-drug training in the United States. He also received special forces training as a member of the elite Grupo Aeromóvil de Fuerzas Especiales (GAFE). (Note: When Guerrero Reyes joined the BFP, it was one of the elite branches of the military along with Grupo Aeromóvil de Fuerzas Especiales (GAFE).) In addition to his military duties, he was also assigned to work temporarily in the National Counter-Narcotics Institute (INCD). He deserted from the military on 4 January 1999.

After this, Guerrero Reyes joined the Gulf Cartel, a cartel organization based in Tamaulipas. He became a member of the cartel's newly created paramilitary group, Los Zetas, which was largely made out of ex-commandos. He was hired to work for the cartel boss Osiel Cárdenas Guillén, and was assigned under Zetas leader Arturo Guzmán Decena ("Z-1"). When Guerrero Reyes joined Los Zetas, the group's purpose was to provide security services to Cárdenas Guillén and conduct executions for the cartel. Over the years, Los Zetas underwent organizational changes and became increasingly involved in other criminal activities alongside the Gulf Cartel, including drug trafficking. With the collaboration of several Gulf Cartel and Zetas members, (Note: The Gulf Cartel members were: Sergio Garza Garza ("El Pollo"), Rogelio García García ("El Roger") and Jorge Eduardo Costilla Sánchez ("El Coss"). The Zetas members were: Jesús Enrique Rejón Aguilar ("El Mamito"), Heriberto Lazcano Lazcano ("El Lazca") and Óscar Guerrero Silva ("El Winniepooh").) Guerrero Reyes forged alliances with South American drug suppliers like Andrea Posada Williamson, Rubén Darío Nieto Benjumea, Elkin Fernando Cano Villa and Edwin Torrado. In the cartel, Guerrero Reyes went by the alias "El Guerrero" (English: The Warrior), which derived from his surname Guerrero, and as "Beto", derived from his middle name, Alberto. He also held the code names of "Z-5" and "Z12-HK44". Guerrero Reyes is cited as one of the founding members of Los Zetas. He was reportedly part of the Grupo de los 14 (English: Group of 14), who were the first fourteen Zetas members. He was based out of Matamoros.

According to the testimony of Agustín Hernández Martínez, a close associate of Cárdenas Guillén, who later became a protected witness under the code name "Rafael", Guerrero Reyes was also an instructor for new Zetas recruits. Under the instruction of Guzmán Decena, Guerrero Reyes and former Army lieutenant Carlos Hau Castañeda led Los Zetas's first training course at a farm known as Punta Selva in Matamoros. Guerrero Reyes provided instruction on how to use AK-47s, AR-15s with grenade launchers, and .50-calibre machine guns. He also taught how to conduct ambushes, rapid deployments, prisoner rescues, counter-insurgencies, intelligence gathering, marksmanship, aerial assault tactics, surveillance, and advanced communication techniques. The course included an intimidation tactics class and rigorous physical fitness tests. The training program lasted about a month. These sessions in Matamoros lasted until September 2001, when Cárdenas Guillén ordered them to be moved to Nuevo León and other parts of Tamaulipas.

Guerrero Reyes was also reportedly responsible for participating in two prison breaks in Tamaulipas and Michoacán. The first one occurred in Matamoros on 27 December 2002, when approximately fifty Zetas members stormed the Federal Social Readaptation Center No. 3 ("Noroeste") and released four inmates linked to the Gulf Cartel. Investigators stated that the Zetas went into the prison dressed in police uniforms and driving vehicles similar to those from the Army. Once inside the prison, they identified themselves as federal officers and showed the prison staff a forged document ordering the release of four individuals. When the staff reviewed the document, they were disarmed by the gunmen, who then forcibly retrieved the four prisoners. The second incident occurred in Apatzingán on 4 January 2004, when approximately forty Zetas members stormed the penitentiary to release five imprisoned Gulf Cartel members linked to Carlos Rosales Mendoza ("El Tísico"). They entered the prison wearing police uniforms and simulated carrying out a routine inspection. Once inside the prison, they overwhelmed the guards and penetrated the security doors. During the raid, around twenty other inmates managed to escape.

=== Criminal charges ===
On 18 June 2003, Mexico's Attorney General's Office (PGR) placed an unspecified bounty on 31 members of Los Zetas, including Guerrero Reyes. Authorities stated that he was "highly dangerous" given his military background and his suspected role in homicides, drug trafficking, kidnappings, and carjackings. This announcement was made after the Specialized Unit Against Organized Crime (UEDO) identified him as a high-ranking member of Los Zetas following the 14 March 2003 arrest of Cárdenas Guillén. Unlike other Zetas members who voluntarily requested their release from the military, Guerrero Reyes had deserted and joined organized crime, which is considered high treason in a military court. Guerrero Reyes was wanted by the PGR, the Secretariat of National Defense (SEDENA) and the Secretariat of Public Security (SSP) for his outstanding charges.

Guerrero Reyes had an arrest warrant issued for his suspected involvement in multiple killings from 12 February to 10 March 2003. He was suspected of killing his girlfriend Erica Edith González, who was found dead in the rural community of La Venada along with two other people, and of his wife Jovanna Lizbeth Melchor Ceballos, who was killed with another man. According to the PGR and SEDENA, Guerrero Reyes was also a main suspect in the murder of kingpin Edelio López Falcón ("El Yeyo"). López Falcón was a former member of the Gulf Cartel, but left to join a rival criminal group after he encountered differences with the cartel after senior cartel member Gilberto García Mena was arrested in 2001. Several within the cartel blamed López Falcón for his arrest. Cárdenas Guillén reportedly commissioned Guerrero Reyes and others, including Zetas members Jesús Enrique Rejón Aguilar ("El Mamito"), Heriberto Lazcano Lazcano ("El Lazca") and/or Óscar Guerrero Silva ("El Winniepooh"), to execute him. López Falcón was killed inside a restaurant on 6 May 2003.

== Death ==
At around 4:30 a.m. on 10 May 2004, Guerrero Reyes was killed by unknown assailants in a drive-by shooting in Matamoros. The attack occurred before dawn near the Wild West discotheque while Guerrero Reyes was inside a silver Jeep Liberty between Michoacán and 16 de Septiembre streets in Colonia Modelo, an industrial neighborhood. Guerrero Reyes had just left the discotheque and was described by authorities as a regular in strip clubs and night clubs in Matamoros. Besides Guerrero Reyes, four other people were killed. One of them was Leandro García González, a former Matamoros Municipal Police officer and alleged cartel member. The other victims were female and identified as Perla Lourdes García Torres, Rosa Isela Purata Cárdenas and Nancy López González. Four of them died at the scene, but the last one was taken alive to the Dr. Alfredo Pumarejo Hospital, where she eventually succumbed to her wounds. The victims' ages and addresses were not revealed to the press.

Neighbors and witnesses stated that the shootout lasted between three and five minutes. One resident stated that at first he thought the noise was caused by the muffler of a vehicle, but as the attack progressed, he realized it was a shootout. The Mexican Federal Police arrived at the scene along with the Tamaulipas State Police and municipal police officers. Onlookers arrived at the scene to observe the aftermath hours later. Investigators discovered that Garcia's corpse was holding a grenade in his hand. Guerrero Reyes was wearing a grenade as a necklace. Matamoros fire fighters and bomb specialists were called to the scene to remove the grenades from Garcia's hand and from Guerrero Reyes' corpse. They were able to remove it without causing a detonation, but it took them around eight hours to defuse Guerrero Reyes's grenade. The vehicle was hit over 100 times with automatic and semi-automatic firearms; many made it through the windshield. Inside the vehicle, the police found two handguns and a machine gun. The vehicle was sent to the Tamaulipas State Police headquarters in southern Matamoros for further investigation.

Near the crime scene, the police arrested José Jesús Quintanilla (aged 19). He was driving a white Ford Mustang that authorities suspected was used by the shooters as a getaway vehicle. The vehicle was also taken to the state police headquarters. A police officer identified Quintanilla as a local customs broker; authorities did not reveal what charges he was arrested for, but they did confirm that he was captured for driving the vehicle that was presumably used by the assassins. It was later revealed that Guerrero Reyes was killed by four unidentified hitmen who carried out the attack in a white taxi. The motive behind the attack was not revealed, and state police chief Arturo Pedroza Aguirre said it was too early to determine if a drug cartel was involved. However, Mexican investigators not authorized to speak with the press stated that it was organized crime-related. U.S. and Mexican authorities did not confirm if the attack was carried out by the Gulf Cartel or conducted by a rival gang which had sprung up in high numbers after the arrest of Cárdenas Guillén. Guerrero Reyes's code name Z-5 was vacated after his death and taken by Zetas member Braulio Arellano Domínguez, who initially held the code name Z-20.

== See also ==
- Mexican drug war

== Bibliography ==
- Grayson, George W. (2010). Mexico: Narco-Violence and a Failed State?. Transaction Publishers. p. 291. ISBN 978-1412811514.
- Grayson, George W. (2017). The Executioner's Men: Los Zetas, Rogue Soldiers, Criminal Entrepreneurs, and the Shadow State They Created. Routledge. ISBN 978-1351296021.
- Marley, David (2019). Mexican cartels: an encyclopedia of Mexico's crime and drug wars. ABC-CLIO. ISBN 9781440864766. OCLC 1096213037.
- Ravelo, Ricardo (2007). Los capos: las narco-rutas de México (in Spanish). Editorial Debolsillo. ISBN 978-9707804463.
- Garcia Cabrera, Jose Luis (2012). 1920-2000 ¡El Pastel! Parte Dos (in Spanish). Palibrio. ISBN 978-1463337018.
