= Edelio López Falcón =

Mexican drug lord (1965–2003)

- Image of Edelio López Falcón
- Born: Edelio López Falcón; 1965; Miguel Alemán, Tamaulipas, Mexico
- Died: 6 May 2003 (aged 37–38); Guadalajara, Jalisco, Mexico
- Cause of death: Gunshot wounds
- Resting place: Roma, Texas, U.S.
- Other names: El Yeyo; Adelio López Falcón
- Employer: Gulf Cartel (suspected)
- Height: 1.75 m (5.7 ft)
- Partner: María Eugenia Garza Díaz (girlfriend)
- Relatives: Rolando López Salinas (cousin)

Edelio López Falcón (1965 – 6 May 2003), commonly referred to as El Yeyo, was a Mexican suspected drug lord and former high-ranking member of the Gulf Cartel, a criminal group based in Tamaulipas, Mexico. Prior to his involvement in drug trafficking, López Falcón owned a flower business in Miguel Alemán. He was part of the cartel during the 1990s and was a trusted enforcer of the former kingpin Gilberto García Mena. López Falcón's role in the cartel was managing drug shipments from Tamaulipas to the United States. Security forces believed López Falcón was not a violent crime boss; he preferred to indulge in his personal interests, which included promoting music and entertainment, managing his restaurant chains, and running his horse-breeding business. After joining the cartel, he continued to pose as a legitimate businessman to keep a low profile.

In the late 1990s, López Falcón encountered problems with García Mena, who sought the support of the cartel's leader Osiel Cárdenas Guillén to oust him. López Falcón broke ties with the Gulf Cartel and forged alliances with the Sinaloa, Milenio, and Juárez cartels. The Gulf Cartel reportedly blamed López Falcón for the April 2001 arrest of García Mena and plotted to kill him. He fled to Nuevo León, where he established his center of operations. López Falcón survived an attempt on his life a month later but he was killed in Guadalajara in May 2003. His murder remains unsolved, but investigators believe his killers were probably members of Los Zetas, the Gulf Cartel's former paramilitary group.

== Personal life and career ==
López Falcón, who is commonly referred to by his nickname El Yeyo, was born in Miguel Alemán, Tamaulipas, Mexico, in 1965. Before becoming involved in drug trafficking, López Falcón owned a flower business in Miguel Alemán. He later joined the Tamaulipas-based criminal group the Gulf Cartel and worked as a smuggler under the kingpin Gilberto García Mena ("El June"). López Falcón and García Mena worked with the drug trafficker Fidel Hinojosa ("El Choco"); Ricardo Garza Manríquez, the former Miguel Alemán Public Security Department head; and Zeferino Peña Cuéllar ("Don Zefe"), the former head of the Miguel Alemán Municipal Police. In the Gulf Cartel, López Falcón was reportedly responsible for coordinating drug trafficking shipments from Nuevo Laredo, Tamaulipas, to the United States. In 1999, the Secretariat of National Defense (SEDENA) identified López Falcón as a rising drug smuggler. Security forces suspected he kept a low-profile status and posed as a businessman. He used the pseudonyms Gilberto Salinas and Edelio Flores to hide his real identity.

López Falcón's cousin Rolando López Salinas ("El Rolis") was reportedly his personal assistant. López Salinas acted as López Falcón's personal bodyguard and head of his security services. Murder operations conducted by López Salinas were ordered directly by García Mena; López Falcón allowed this because he preferred not to be linked to that part of the business. According to Mexican security forces, López Falcón was not known to be a violent criminal leader. He reportedly avoided ordering murders, preferring to focus on drug trafficking and his other interests, which included promoting ranchera music and entertainment, cockfighting, managing his restaurant chains, and equestrianism and horse breeding. His affinity for breeding fine horses earned him the nickname "El Señor de los Caballos" (English: The Lord of the Horses). López Falcón was one of the wealthiest people in Miguel Alemán; he owned multiple properties, including an estate known as The Bougainvilleas (Spanish: Las Bugambilias), where he hosted the city's anniversary parties and multiple horse-racing events. García Mena and the Miguel Alemán mayor Raúl Rodríguez Barrera sometimes attended these events. Other invitees included local officials, members of the Mexican military, and bettors from across Mexico. Authorities suspected his horse-breeding business was a money laundering front and that he used a strawperson to manage it.

One of López Falcón's last public appearances was on 22 June 2000 when he was seen at the opening of a restaurant in Monterrey; nine pictures of the event were leaked to the Monterrey-based newspaper Diario de Monterrey two years later. López Falcón appeared with multiple people, including the Nuevo León governor Fernando Canales Clariond. (Note: A link between Canales and López Falcón was not confirmed. The picture, however, was largely criticized by Canales' political opposition, who said it was a sign of his administration's collusion with organized crime. Canales said he did not know López Falcón and that as a politician, he was bound to take pictures with several people.) Other attendees included the Santiago mayor Eduardo Manuel García Garza and the priest Alejandro Leal, who conducted the inauguration blessings. López Falcón was with his girlfriend María Eugenia Garza Díaz, the daughter of the restaurant owner. When López Falcón was not attending his businesses in Tamaulipas, he spent his time in Texas, where he reportedly continued to run drug trafficking activities.

According to the Texas Department of Public Safety, López Falcón was a legal U.S. resident and lived at a house in Houston with a female named Yolanda and a male named Roberto Pérez López. Security forces suspected that López Falcón used Houston as a safe haven; he had a criminal background in Houston where he was identified as an illegal people smuggler. On his Texas driver's license, his name was listed as Adelio López Falcón. (Note: According to the cited source, Adelio may have presumably been his real first name.) He was listed as being 1.75 m (5.7 ft) tall and weighing 83 kg (183 lb). His date of birth was listed as 26 June 1955, whereas in Mexico his year of birth was listed as 1965. The U.S. driver's license was once suspended by a Texan judge; López Falcón was released on parole and was re-issued with a new license with the same Houston address.

=== New alliances ===
López Falcón and García Mena began having disagreements in the late 1990s. The differences started after López Falcón began diversifying the Gulf Cartel's portfolio and started smuggling cocaine to the U.S. from Tamaulipas. García Mena primarily smuggled marijuana through this corridor. García Mena sought support from Osiel Cárdenas Guillén, the top leader of the Gulf Cartel, to try to oust López Falcón. López Falcón sided with López Salinas and sought the support of rival organized crime groups. In mid-2000, López Falcón and López Salinas met with members of the Sinaloa Cartel and brokered a drug deal without the Gulf Cartel's approval. López Falcón eventually left the Gulf Cartel and formed an alliance with the Sinaloa Cartel, which promised López Falcón larger profits in exchange for allowing them to smuggle drugs in Tamaulipas. This prompted García Mena and the Gulf Cartel to fully cut ties with López Falcón and his group.

López Falcón forged an alliance with the Sinaloa Cartel, Milenio Cartel, and Juárez Cartel, which operated as a triangle organization. In 2000, the Attorney General's Office (PGR) confirmed an alliance between López Falcón and Arturo Beltrán Leyva, a kingpin who had ties with the drug lords Ismael "El Mayo" Zambada and Ignacio Coronel Villarreal. According to information provided by United States Drug Enforcement Administration (DEA), López Falcón also worked closely with the Milenio Cartel kingpin Armando Valencia Cornelio. López Falcón was reportedly the Milenio Cartel's main intermediary in Monterrey, Nuevo León. Investigators also believed López Falcón allowed the Milenio Cartel to smuggle drugs from Nuevo Laredo to Texas. Intelligence reports, however, indicated Valencia Cornelio did not fully trust López Falcón because he believed he was a law enforcement informant. To defend himself from the Gulf Cartel's front, López Falcón also sided with Dionisio Román García Sánchez ("El Chacho"), a former state police officer and head of a Nuevo Laredo-based smuggling group known as Los Chachos. Los Chachos had an alliance with the triangle organization López Falcón worked with and helped them smuggle drugs in Tamaulipas. Los Chachos also helped López Falcón's group fight off the Gulf Cartel's forces in their turf. (Note: Other police reports suggest that López Falcón and his alliance with Los Chachos was a pact of non-aggression to fight Cárdenas Guillén's group.)

In his new role, López Falcón continued to pose as a legitimate businessman. He was tasked with ensuring his new organization had political support and protection from the police, especially because they were operating in a locale they were not originally from. To gain political support in northern Mexico, López Falcón's new leaders tasked him with finding an influential politician to support them. López Falcón reached out to the National Action Party (PAN) politician Mauricio Fernández Garza, who was running for governor of Nuevo León in 2003. According to Fernández, López Falcón contacted him in early 2003 for a meeting; López Falcón once visited his office to deliver several suitcases filled with U.S. dollars. The money was reportedly intended to help Fernández finance his campaign in exchange for his political support and permission to operate in Nuevo León should Fernández win the election. Fernández said he did not accept the money.

==== Downfall ====
On 22 September 2000, the Gulf Cartel carried out an armed attack against López Salinas in Miguel Alemán. He was not injured in the attack but his chauffeur Héctor Arias was wounded. The attack was presumed to be carried out on García Mena's orders. Five days later, six gunmen were arrested in Ciudad Camargo, Tamaulipas, following an anonymous tip provided to the Tamaulipas State Police. In their confession to the police, the gunmen said they were hired by López Salinas and were from the Sinaloan cities of Culiacán and Guamúchil. They also said they were stationed in Nuevo León and ordered to make incursions into Tamaulipas. This alarmed the police of the presence of organized crime members from other turfs outside Tamaulipas. On 27 November 2000, the Miguel Alemán Rural Police chief Pablo Gaytán Mejía was murdered by four gunmen, presumably on López Falcón's orders. Gaytán Mejía was reportedly a close friend of García Mena and helped facilitate his drug operations. After the attack, García Mena's henchmen killed the four gunmen. Fearing for his life, López Falcón fled Miguel Alemán and settled in Monterrey. His family fled the area after learning about his issues with García Mena. (Note: López Falcón had family members in Roma, Texas. They owned several restaurants and service companies.) López Falcón's estate was abandoned but he continued to visit the city discreetly.

On 9 April 2001, the Mexican Army arrested García Mena after a week-long manhunt in Guardados de Abajo, Camargo. The Gulf Cartel suspected López Falcón plotted against him by informing Mexican authorities of his whereabouts. They also believed the way security forces raided several properties containing drugs and the house where García Mena was hiding was unusually specific, which led them to believe López Falcón had betrayed them. The Gulf Cartel thus carried out a search to kill López Falcón and other aligned with his faction. To increase law enforcement and media attention against López Falcón and several of his accomplices, Cárdenas Guillén's lawyer Juan Jesús Guerrero Chapa leaked a false rumor that López Falcón was part of a new Nuevo León-based criminal group known as the Monterrey Cartel (Spanish: Cártel de Monterrey) to the national press in mid-2001. This media strategy was also employed to help ease the increasing law enforcement pressure the Gulf Cartel was experiencing in Tamaulipas following the arrest of García Mena and to help refocus their efforts against Cárdenas Guillén's turf competitors. Federal and state officials later stated that the Monterrey Cartel did not exist.

== Assassination attempt ==
On 13 May 2001, López Falcon attended a Vicente Fernández music concert inside a cockpit arena in Guadalupe, Nuevo León. At around 4:00 am, approximately fourteen gunmen from the Gulf Cartel's former paramilitary group Los Zetas stormed the arena searching for him. Authorities confirmed that the gunmen were carrying AK-47s and .38 calibre firearms, identified themselves as members of the army, and ordered people to stay on the ground. The gunmen entered the arena and fired their guns into the air to create confusion among the attendees and force López Falcón to flee outside, where the gunmen planned to kill him. Surveillance videos captured López Falcón in the front seats of the event sitting next to a blond woman. (Note: Another source stated that López Falcón was in the arena with suspected drug lords Zeferino Peña Cuéllar ("Don Zefe"), Dionisio Román García Sánchez ("El Chacho"), and Miguel Ángel Alanís Caballero ("La Chiva"), among others.) He was able to leave before the gunmen entered the arena after his bodyguards alerted him of the presence of armed men outside. (Note: Another source stated that López Falcón was alerted by several members of the Nuevo León State Police, including a commander, who were reportedly with him at the arena. Authorities also confirmed that López Falcón had at least one bodyguard, whose name was Nicolás Balcázar ("El Nico") and was a member of the Federal Judicial Police (PJF) in Nuevo León.) López Falcón had at least twenty bodyguards posted inside and outside the arena. He left the premises escorted by his gunmen and by merging with the crowd of concert attendees. He did not suffer any injuries. Outside the premises, Los Zetas shot at multiple vehicles and injured a bystander but they failed to kill their intended target.

Authorities initially suspected García Mena ordered the attack as retaliation for López Falcón's alleged involvement in his arrest. Other authorities suspected Cárdenas Guillén ordered the attack because he saw López Falcón as a threat to his hegemony and wanted to eliminate the competition on his turf. Investigators stated the Gulf Cartel was tracking López Falcón's whereabouts in Nuevo León and were reportedly close to killing him at his home in Monterrey days prior. Upon discovering that López Falcón was planning to attend the event that night, the Gulf Cartel mounted an operation against him. Prior to the attack, López Falcón was a relatively unknown crime boss outside his area of influence. Los Zetas was also a newly formed group within the Gulf Cartel and was not well known outside Tamaulipas. The attack catapulted to fame both Los Zetas and López Falcón to national attention. Among politicians, the incident raised worries about the presence of drug lords in Nuevo León and the alleged existence of the Monterrey Cartel.

On 3 June 2001, a picture of López Falcón sitting in the arena's seats was published by the Monterrey-based newspaper El Norte. A few days later, an anonymous citizen issued a memo to the PGR and El Norte with pictures of López Falcón accusing him of being in public places in Miguel Alemán with armed men and that local authorities did nothing to stop him. Authorities suspect this memo was submitted by his rivals. Later that month, the PGR and Nuevo León authorities confirmed López Falcón did not have a pending arrest warrant or a formal indictment at a federal and state level. Both levels of government agreed to work together to formally start an investigation against López Falcón's alleged criminal activities. PGR investigator Mario Roldán Quirino opened an investigation against him. Roldán Quirino, however, was murdered on 21 February 2002.

=== Aftermath and manhunt ===
Following the assassination attempt, authorities increased their efforts to arrest López Falcón, one of the most-wanted criminals in northern Mexico. On 5 June 2001, the Mexican Army carried out a secret operation in Mier, Miguel Alemán, and Camargo to arrest López Falcón and suspected Gulf Cartel trafficker Alesio García Peña ("El Huarachón"). They raided multiple properties, including two houses in Mier tied to García Peña, a ranch owned by García Mena, and a property in Camargo, where they seized 345 kg (761 lb) of marijuana. The Army also set up a checkpoint in front of López Falcón's estate but did not raid it. The PGR confirmed the drugs were not linked to the traffickers for whom they were searching and one person was arrested in the operation. The operation lasted less than a day; the federal troops returned to their barracks before midnight. Local authorities supported the measures carried out by the Army and the PGR, and stated that they expected more secret operations to be carried out in the area in light of the growing presence of organized crime activity in northern Mexico.

On 4 August 2001, a shootout between López Falcón's and López Salinas' gunmen broke out outside a cockfighting arena in Reynosa. According to police reports, the gunmen got into a verbal dispute at the parking lot of the arena after the Bobby Pulido music concert ended. Three people were injured in the attack. Authorities drew similarities with the shootout in Nuevo León months prior in which López Falcón was targeted. On 30 October 2001, approximately fourteen gunmen stormed an estate in Monterrey to kill Peña Cuéllar. One person was killed and two others were injured but Peña Cuéllar was not present when the incident occurred. According to police reports, the attack may have been ordered by López Falcón as vengeance after he discovered Peña Cuéllar had started the rumor that López Falcón was responsible for García Mena arrest. Security forces suspected that by framing López Falcón, Peña Cuéllar wanted to earn a high-ranking position within Cárdenas Guillén's chain of command. García Mena had originally framed López Falcón as his informant and blamed him for his capture.

On 20 November 2001, López Falcón's bodyguard Juan Martínez Torres ("El Banano") was kidnapped in Miguel Alemán. A few days later, López Falcón's lead accountant Jaime Barrera Peña was also kidnapped; police suspected they were probably kidnapped by Cárdenas Guillén's faction. On 28 November 2001, eighteen gunmen broke into an estate owned by Gabriel Garza Rodríguez, a suspected Gulf Cartel member, in Cadereyta. The gunmen killed one of the property guards and injured two children. The PGR and the Mexican Army raided the property a few days later in search of López Falcón, and continued their searches in Monterrey to arrest him and several of his associates, including Mario Ramírez ("La Gata") and René García Solís ("La Pata de Garra"), Raymundo's sibling. The attack was reportedly carried out on López Falcón's orders because René was linked to Peña Cuéllar. The gunmen mistook Raymundo's estate for René's. On 13 May 2002, the Gulf Cartel kidnapped López Falcón's associate García Sánchez in Monterrey; he was tortured and killed, and his corpse was abandoned in Nuevo Progreso, Tamaulipas, a few days later. Killings and attacks between the Gulf Cartel and López Falcón's faction continued in Nuevo León through the rest of the year. The escalating dispute between both groups led to additional military deployments of the Mexican Armed Forces in Tamaulipas and Nuevo León.

==== Closing in on López Falcón ====
In late 2002, authorities seized multiple drug shipments reportedly owned by López Falcón's group. On 9 October 2002, former Tamaulipas State Police chief Carlos González Pamatz was arrested in Houston with 100 kg (220 lb) of cocaine from López Falcón's group. The following day, federal policemen stationed in China, Nuevo León, arrested suspected drug traffickers Jorge Calzada García and Patricia Rodríguez Madrigal, who were in possession of 33 kg (73 lb) of cocaine in a vehicle. In their police confession, Calzada García said he was hired by a man named Evelio or Edelio, who went by the alias El Yeyo. He said he did not recall this man's last name. Policemen suspected he was referring to López Falcón. Calzada García was paid US$4,000 to transport the drugs; he said he was told to collect the vehicle filled with drugs at a shopping center in San Pedro Garza García and drive it to Reynosa, where he initially brokered the deal and received the vehicle's keys from El Yeyo. Rodríguez Madrigal said she was not aware of the drug deal. The couple was driving a Peugeot that was bought in the state of Jalisco but had Tamaulipas license plates. Investigators began investigating a drug link between Monterrey, Reynosa, and Guadalajara. While facing a judge, however, Calzada García retracted his statement and said he did not recall the exact name of the man who hired him. He said the man's name was Edelio Ramírez or Rodríguez, that his nickname was La Yeya, and that he lived in McAllen, Texas. This was the second largest drug seizure in Nuevo León in 2002 and showed the PGR López Falcón was likely operating in Monterrey and trying to take over the turf from Cárdenas Guillén. Reynosa was generally considered a turf controlled by Cárdenas Guillén.

On 14 March 2003, the Mexican Army arrested Cárdenas Guillén in Matamoros. Prior to his capture, the Gulf Cartel experienced several major blows from law enforcement crackdowns, including the arrests of some of Cárdenas Guillén's lieutenants such as García Mena, Adán Medrano Rodríguez, Rubén Sauceda Rivera, and José Manuel Garza Rendón. Authorities believed Cárdenas Guillén's possible successors were Peña Cuéllar, Víctor Manuel Vázquez Mireles, Gregorio Sauceda Gamboa, and Jorge Eduardo Costilla Sánchez. They reiterated that one of the major targets was López Falcón, who they regarded as one of the top-three Gulf Cartel leaders in the past two years. (Note: The source misspells his name as Baudelio López Falcón.) They said unlike other gangs like Los Chachos, López Falcón had the operational capacity to confront the Gulf Cartel. The Army and the PGR thus refocused their efforts to apprehend him; they feared he had become one of the leading drug lords in northern Mexico and south Texas. They also suspected he no longer lived in Tamaulipas and had relocated to Nuevo León, where he reportedly owned several money laundering fronts.

== Death ==
On 6 May 2003, two gunmen murdered López Falcón in a restaurant in Guadalajara, Jalisco. (Note: Another source stated there were three gunmen.) The gunmen sat at a table close to López Falcón, who was having breakfast with horse breeder Óscar Alejandro Coker Preciado and an unidentified woman. López Falcón finished his food and chatted for over an hour afterwards. When he ordered the check, the gunmen stood up and began walking towards the restroom. On their way, they passed next to the table where López Falcón was sitting and shot him from behind. Investigators confirmed López Falcon was shot three times in the head at point-blank range and died at the scene. According to investigators, López Falcón arrived at the restaurant after being dropped off by someone else. (Note: This was deduced by investigators because López Falcón was not carrying any vehicle keys.) He had no bodyguards with him. Authorities requested the closure of the restaurant until further notice so evidence from the crime scene could be gathered.

López Falcón was at the restaurant discussing the purchase of a pure-bred horse, which he wanted to take to one of his ranches in Texas. Coker Preciado and López Falcón had previously met in Texas and Monterrey. Coker Preciado was unharmed in the attack but suffered a nervous breakdown and was attended to by emergency staff when they arrived at the scene. The other person who was eating with them left moments before the murder. A police officer guarding a nearby bank heard the gunshots; he thought a bank robbery was underway and called for reinforcements. The Guadalajara Municipal Police were the first to arrive at the scene; they discovered López Falcón's body sitting next to his table. When he died, López Falcón had with him four cellphones, a push-to-talk device, US$1,260 and MXN$6,200 in cash, several credit cards, his Texas driver's license, a Rolex watch, a gold ring and necklace, and a business card from a McAllen-based construction company.

=== Investigation ===
When news of the murder was made public, it was not known that the victim was López Falcón and/or a suspected crime boss. Preliminary reports described the victim as a businessman from Monterrey; rumors the businessman was a crime boss, likely López Falcón himself, began circulating. Mexican authorities doubted the victim was López Falcón because they thought it was unusual that he was in Guadalajara, which was far from his center of operations. Investigators had information that he was hiding in McAllen. López Falcón's identity card named him by his alternate first name Adelio. Jalisco authorities suspected the victim was probably López Falcón and federal authorities did not discard this possibility. His identity was confirmed by the Jalisco authorities on 8 May after they cross-referenced his identity cards with information federal authorities had on file. Jalisco authorities confirmed that López Falcón had no pending criminal charges in Jalisco but said he was suspected of being involved in drug trafficking in Tamaulipas and Nuevo León.

The same day, Jalisco's attorney general Gerardo Octavio Solís Gómez confirmed the PGR was taking over the case and placing it under federal jurisdiction; the case would be headed by the Specialized Unit Against Organized Crime (UEDO), one of the PGR's former branches. State officials requested the PGR's assistance on the case because of López Falcón's criminal profile and his alleged involvement in drug trafficking, a crime that falls under federal jurisdiction. The UEDO said the investigation would also include the charges of illegal possession of military-exclusive firearms and organized crime involvement against the suspects. They were expecting Jalisco authorities to open a separate homicide case under state jurisdiction. Federal authorities asked state officials to withhold information about the case from the public and recommended secrecy in the investigation.

The federal government dispatched troops from the Federal Investigation Agency (AFI) and the PGR to Guadalajara. They were planning to increase security in Jalisco and Nuevo León to prevent a violent response from organized crime groups. López Salinas was the suspected successor to López Falcón; authorities believed a turf war between his faction and those aligned with Cárdenas Guillén was a possible aftermath. The UEDO also took Coker Preciado to Mexico City for questioning. Coker Preciado confirmed to investigators that there were two gunmen in the attack and that they escaped the crime scene in a white vehicle. Eyewitnesses said López Falcón's killers were dressed in white and walked away from the scene after killing him but most were unable to provide investigators with physical descriptions of them. The policeman at the bank said he saw the gunmen; he was the only person who provided the PGR with this information. Some eyewitnesses said a woman arrived at the restaurant moments after the murder to inspect the scene but investigators could not link her with López Falcón. At the scene, investigators discovered two .45 pistol bullet casings. (Note: Another source stated that there was at least one firearm used that had a .38 caliber.)

According to the PGR and SEDENA, their main line of investigation was that López Falcón was killed by members of Los Zetas on Cárdenas Guillén's orders. They suspected Jesús Enrique Rejón Aguilar ("El Mamito"), Heriberto Lazcano Lazcano ("El Lazca"), Luis Alberto Guerrero Reyes ("El Guerrero"), and/or Óscar Guerrero Silva ("El Winniepooh") may have participated in the murder. Before joining organized crime, these men were members of the Mexican Army's Special Forces Airmobile Group (GAFE) and were hired by Cárdenas Guillén as part of his security circle. Another line of investigation suggested López Falcón may have been killed by a gambling group within the horse-racing or cockfighting industries; he was known for gambling millions on these sports and the police believed the method the gunmen used to kill López Falcón was one not usually used by Tamaulipas-based criminal groups. The police did not discard the possibility López Falcón may have been betrayed and killed on orders of the Milenio Cartel's leadership circle, or by members of Los Texas, a Nuevo Laredo-based gang that was a rival to both López Falcón and the Gulf Cartel.

=== Body handling and funeral ===
López Falcón's corpse was first kept at the Forensic Medical Service in Jalisco, where authorities expected his family members to reclaim it. They wanted to interview his relatives about the case. On 8 May, a man who identified himself as López Falcón's nephew telephoned the morgue asking how to reclaim the body but he did not arrive in person. Another man called the morgue asking for similar details; he grew angry at staff and told them he would forcibly take the body if they did not give it to him. This incident alarmed authorities, and forced them to guard the morgue and López Falcón's body using security forces from Guadalajara metropolitan area, the Jalisco State Police, the PGR, and AFI, until further notice.

On 9 May, López Falcón's sister traveled from Roma, Texas, to Guadalajara to confirm the identity of the corpse. She was accompanied by her two attorneys to start the body reclamation process. (Note: Another source stated that she was accompanied by only one attorney.) The UEDO interviewed his sister before meeting with the Jalisco Institute of Forensic Sciences, who gathered her blood samples and conducted DNA tests on the body. The test results were expected to be ready in one or two weeks, (Note: Another source stated the results were expected in two or three weeks.) and Jalisco authorities stated that the corpse would not be given to relatives until their family link was confirmed. The PGR were responsible for setting the date when the body would be given to López Falcón's family. After the DNA tests, his sister returned to Texas and awaited the notification from Mexican authorities. The police thought his family would hold a wake in Miguel Alemán or Mexico City, and that López Falcón would be buried in Guardados de Arriba, a rural community in Miguel Alemán where his wife, who died in the 1990s, was buried.

On 11 May, the Secretariat of Health approved López Falcón's transfer; his corpse was flown from Miguel Hidalgo International Airport in Guadalajara to General Lucio Blanco International Airport in Reynosa. The body was then transported to the U.S. and sent to a funeral home in Rio Grande City, Texas, where it was prepared for burial. At Roma–Ciudad Miguel Alemán International Bridge, the Mexican Army set up a checkpoint to search for suspicious vehicles and individuals with drugs or weapons. They questioned drivers about their destination and purpose of their travel, and were wary of vehicles with license plates other than Tamaulipas' and of luxurious vehicles. A wake and mass were held on 12 May; his sister said López Falcón would be buried in Roma on 14 May. At the morgue and funeral, his family asked the local police to control attendees' access; visitors were eventually allowed to visit López Falcón's services but the police did not allow the media to access the area. Multiple corrido and mariachi songs were composed for López Falcón and played during his funeral.

== See also ==
- List of unsolved murders (2000–present)
- Mexican drug war

== Bibliography ==
- Ravelo, Ricardo (2012). Osiel: Vida y tragedia de un capo (in Spanish). Penguin Random House. ISBN 978-6073107716.
- Grayson, George W.; Logan, Samuel (2012). The Executioner's Men: Los Zetas, Rogue Soldiers, Criminal Entrepreneurs, and the Shadow State They Created. Transaction Publishers. ISBN 978-1412846172.
- Correa-Cabrera, Guadalupe (2017). Los Zetas Inc.: Criminal Corporations, Energy, and Civil War in Mexico. University of Texas Press. ISBN 978-1477312773.
- Brook, John Lee (2016). Blood+death: The Secret History of Santa Muerte and the Mexican Drug Cartels. SCB Distributors. ISBN 978-1909394223.
- Osorno, Diego Enrique (2011). El cártel de Sinaloa (in Spanish). Penguin Random House. ISBN 978-6073102346.
- Valdés Castellanos, Guillermo (2013). Historia del narcotráfico en México (in Spanish). Penguin Random House. ISBN 978-6071127129.
- Gómez, María Idalia; Fritz, Darío (2005). Con la muerte en el bolsillo: seis desaforadas historias del narcotráfico en México (in Spanish). Planeta Group. ISBN 978-9703700271.
- G. Aguiar, José Carlos; Suárez de Garay, María Eugenia (2008). Policía, seguridad y transición política: acercamientos al estado del México contemporáneo (in Spanish). Universiteit van Amsterdam: Centre for Latin American Studies and Documentation. ISBN 978-9070280499.
- Marley, David (2019). Mexican cartels: an encyclopedia of Mexico's crime and drug wars. ABC-CLIO. ISBN 9781440864766. OCLC 1096213037.
