= Rolando López Salinas =

Mexican drug lord (1948/53–2018)

- Born: 1948/1953; Tamaulipas, Mexico
- Died: September 2018 (aged 65–70)
- Body discovered: San Pedro Garza García, Nuevo León, Mexico
- Other names: El Rolis; El 8
- Employers: Gulf Cartel (suspected); Beltrán-Leyva Cartel (suspected)
- Relatives: Edelio López Falcón (cousin)

Rolando López Salinas (1948/1953 – September 2018), also known as El Rolis, was a Mexican suspected drug lord and former high-ranking member of the Gulf Cartel, a criminal group based in Tamaulipas, Mexico. López Salinas started his criminal career as the right-hand man of his cousin Edelio López Falcón and was in charge of his security services, and later became involved in drug trafficking operations. During his criminal career, López Salinas survived two assassination attempts—one in 1999 and another in 2000—which were reportedly triggered by his differences with Gilberto García Mena, a former cartel boss. After López Falcón came into conflict with the cartel's leadership, both he and López Salinas broke ties with the cartel and forged alliances with rival criminal groups.

López Salinas eventually joined the Beltrán-Leyva Cartel, a criminal group that arose from the remnants of the Sinaloa Cartel, and became one of its senior members. In 2015, law enforcement agencies identified him as the head of the cartel in Monterrey and San Pedro Garza García. On 4 September 2018, gunmen kidnapped López Salinas in San Pedro Garza García; his corpse was found a few days later, bearing visible signs of torture. His assassins left a sign at the crime scene warning other cartel members that they would be killed if they did not surrender. Investigators suspect he was murdered by members of his own cartel.

== Career ==
Rolando López Salinas, also known by his nickname "El Rolis", was born in Tamaulipas, Mexico between 1948 and 1953. (Note: His date of birth was calculated based on his estimated age (65 to 70 years old) when he was found dead in 2018.) In the 1990s, he was reportedly a member of the Gulf Cartel, a criminal group based in Tamaulipas, and worked under his cousin Edelio López Falcón ("El Yeyo") as his top enforcer and his personal bodyguard, and was responsible for managing his security services. Although López Salinas reported directly to his cousin, murder operations conducted by López Salinas and his faction were ordered directly by the drug lord Gilberto García Mena ("El June"), to whom both reported. López Falcón allowed this because he preferred to not be linked to that part of the business. In the late 1990s, however, López Falcón and García Mena entered into conflict with one another.

The conflict started after López Falcón began diversifying the Gulf Cartel's portfolio and smuggling cocaine to the U.S. from Tamaulipas, a corridor through which García Mena primarily smuggled marijuana. García Mena sought support from Osiel Cárdenas Guillén, the leader of the Gulf Cartel, to try to oust both López Salinas and López Falcón, both of whom sought the support of rival organized crime groups. In mid-2000, López Salinas and López Falcón met with members of the Sinaloa Cartel and brokered a drug deal without the Gulf Cartel's approval. Both men eventually left the Gulf Cartel and formed an alliance with the Sinaloa Cartel, which promised them larger profits in exchange for allowing them to smuggle drugs in Tamaulipas. This prompted García Mena and the Gulf Cartel to fully cut ties with López Salinas and his group. At that time, the Sinaloa Cartel operated as a triangle organization and had an alliance with the Milenio and Juárez Cartels, criminal groups that rivaled the Gulf Cartel.

In 2001, López Salinas was accused of collaborating with three military personnel based in Tamaulipas: General Ricardo Martínez Perea, Infantryman Javier Antonio Quevedo Guerrero, and Captain Pedro Maya Díaz. The investigation against López Salinas began in January 2001, when residents from Miguel Alemán complained to federal authorities that several drug traffickers based in the area were receiving protection from the Mexican Armed Forces. An anonymous fax was sent to the Secretariat of National Defense (SEDENA); the fax provided details of the Gulf Cartel's use of the military for their drug-trafficking activities. López Salinas was accused of receiving information to prevent his drug shipments from being seized he was notified of the movements of law enforcement personnel in the area. The Mexican military sent undercover troops to the area to investigate the incident. Upon gathering information from Miguel Alemán residents, they were made aware that López Salinas reportedly owned a health clinic in the city and that Quevedo, Maya, and other military officials were hospitalized there sometime between June and July 2000 after overdosing on cocaine. (Note: The defense team of the military men accused denied the claims; they said the military men were in San Luis Potosí during that time and that López Salinas did not own a health clinic.)

=== Assassination attempts ===
In February 1999, Cárdenas Guillén met with his enforcer Arturo Guzmán Decena ("Z-1"), the head of the Gulf Cartel's former paramilitary group Los Zetas, at a safe house in Reynosa and ordered him to gather twenty of his henchmen to kill López Salinas. Cárdenas Guillén and López Salinas had been friends but the former wanted to kill him because of his conflict with García Mena. According to government files, Cárdenas Guillén's gunmen arrived at López Salinas' home in Miguel Alemán and surrounded it. Only Guzmán Decena and his associate Heriberto Lazcano Lazcano ("Z-3") entered the premises. The rest of the henchmen, including Juan Carlos de la Cruz Reyna ("Z-36"), Braulio Arellano Domínguez ("Z-20"), Hugo Ponce Salazar ("Z-4"), Mateo Díaz López ("Z-10"), Rogelio García García ("El Roger"), and Baldomero González Ruiz ("El Viejo Fox"), remained outside. A shootout between them and López Salinas' gunmen broke out at the property. During the shootout, Lazcano shot at a gas tank, causing an explosion that killed several people inside. Guzmán Decena and Lazcano fled the scene shortly thereafter. González Ruiz suffered a gunshot wound on his jaw. According to a government protected witness, (Note: The protected witness was Alejandro Lucio Morales Betancourt ("Z-2"), a former high-ranking member of Los Zetas.) multiple gunmen died inside the house but he stated that the Tamaulipas State Police covered up the incident. The Gulf Cartel failed to reach López Salinas, their intended target. After the operation, the gunmen returned to the safe house in Reynosa and notified Cárdenas Guillén of what occurred.

After learning of López Salinas' defection from the Gulf Cartel, García Mena plotted to kill him. On 22 September 2000, López Salinas was nearly killed in a drive-by ambush in Miguel Alemán. He was traveling in an armored Escalade vehicle with his chauffeur and bodyguard Héctor Arias when the attack occurred. As they turned at a street corner, they noticed two vehicles with their hoods raised as though they had engine problems blocking the road. Arias put the vehicle into reverse but two more vehicles corralled behind them to prevent them from escaping. Arias and López Salinas reached for their weapons as they saw several gunmen exiting their vehicles. The assailants fired at López Salinas' vehicle using a number of firearms but the bullet-proof windows prevented any gunshots from penetrating it. López Salinas and Arias then lowered their side windows and fired back. During this exchange, Arias was shot on the elbow. Both of them were able to drive away from the scene shortly thereafter.

==== Aftermath ====
To protect himself from future attacks, López Salinas hired six assassins from the state of Sinaloa. (Note: Their names were Humberto Rodríguez (aged 20), Carlos Gutiérrez González (aged 24), Carlos Castillo Leija (aged 36), Esteban Fabela Valenzuela (aged 24), Santos Arellano Silva (aged 32), and Jorge Alberto Salazar Soto (aged 47). Another source stated that López Salinas hired the gunmen to protect himself from a criminal group in southern Mexico that wanted him dead for a drug debt.) On 27 September 2000, however, the hitmen were arrested at Colonia Infonavit Rinconada in Miguel Alemán; they initially resisted arrest and fired at the police officers when confronted but they surrendered after the Tamaulipas State Police surrounded them and ordered them to turn themselves in. According to police reports, the gunmen were posing as state policemen and were arrested after authorities received an anonymous tip. In their confession, they stated they were in Tamaulipas to protect López Salinas, and that their center of operations was in Nuevo León. The police suspected López Salinas was planning to use the gunmen to carry out an attack against García Mena's forces. After learning the gunmen were working for López Salinas, the PGR confirmed they were joining state officials in the investigation. Two agents and a commander from the Tamaulipas State Police were under investigation for allegedly providing support to López Salinas and his gunmen. In addition, Nuevo León authorities were also investigating the gunmen for their alleged involvement in the homicide of three people in Apodaca on 22 September. (Note: The three people killed were José Eligio Beltrán Aranguren (who was using the alias José Alberto Torres González), Artemio Sauceda Pérez, and María del Socorro Muñoz Alvarado. Cristina Alvarado Rodríguez was injured in the attack. Law enforcement proposed multiple motives for multiple homicides.)

After waiting several days for a warrant, judge María Guadalupe Gómez Núñez granted the Mexican Army and the Federal Judicial Police (PJF) permission to raid López Salinas' home in Miguel Alemán on 30 September 2000. Security forces suspected his house was being used as a safe house for the cartel's operations. At the scene, authorities found six AK-47s, two handguns, 871 rounds of ammunition, a grenade, and twenty packages of marijuana weighing 157 kg (346 lb). They also seized two vehicle air bags, which investigators suspected López Salinas removed from his vehicles to hide grenades. The grenades were intended to be used during shootouts and were retrieved by operating a sophisticated electronic system. Authorities also confirmed the six gunmen arrested days prior had been staying in this house and that they were probably preparing for an attack against López Salinas' rivals.

=== Manhunt and resurgence ===
On 9 April 2001, the Mexican Army arrested García Mena after a week-long manhunt in Guardados de Abajo, Camargo. The Gulf Cartel suspected López Falcón plotted against García Mena and informed Mexican authorities on his whereabouts. The Gulf Cartel thus carried out a search to kill him and those aligned with his faction. About a month after the arrest, López Falcón was subject to an assassination attempt in Guadalupe, Nuevo León. On 13 May 2001, several gunmen from Los Zetas stormed into a cockfighting arena and music concert that López Falcón was attending. He left the arena unharmed by merging with the rest of the concert-goers, but the incident spawned national headlines and catapulted López Falcón to fame. Both he and his cousin became top priorities for law enforcement. In June 2001, an anonymous citizen issued a memo to the PGR and the Monterrey-based newspaper El Norte with pictures of López Salinas and López Falcón; the memo accused López Salinas of being in public places in Miguel Alemán with armed men and that local authorities reportedly did nothing to stop him. Authorities suspect this memo was submitted by López Salinas' rivals.

To increase law enforcement and media attention against López Salinas and several of his accomplices, Cárdenas Guillén's lawyer Juan Jesús Guerrero Chapa leaked a fake rumor that López Salinas and López Falcón were part of a new Nuevo León-based criminal group known as the Monterrey Cartel (Spanish: Cártel de Monterrey) to the national press in mid-2001. This media strategy was also used to help ease the increasing law enforcement pressure the Gulf Cartel was experiencing in Tamaulipas following the arrest of García Mena and to help refocus their efforts against Cárdenas Guillén's turf competitors. The rumors prompted the PGR to investigate López Salinas' links with members of the PJF and the Nuevo León State Police. Federal and state officials later stated that the Monterrey Cartel did not exist.

On 31 July 2001, the Specialized Unit Against Organized Crime (UEDO), one of the PGR's former branches, carried out a joint operation with the Mexican military to arrest López Salinas in Miguel Alemán and Camargo. Security forces believed López Salinas and his associate Mario Ramírez ("La Gata") were trying to become the leading cocaine traffickers in the area. Both López Salinas and Ramírez reportedly formed an alliance to defend themselves from the Gulf Cartel in the border area known as La Frontera Chica. They said this was due to the leadership void resulting from García Mena's arrest and López Falcón's assassination attempt, which forced him to leave Tamaulipas. The UEDO carried out this operation after U.S. authorities seized two tons of cocaine that were reportedly owned by López Salinas and Ramírez. The military was withdrawn from the area on 28 July.

On 4 August, a shootout between López Falcón's and López Salinas' gunmen broke out outside a cockfighting arena in Reynosa. According to police reports, the gunmen argued in the arena's parking lot following a Bobby Pulido music concert. Three people were injured in the attack. Authorities drew similarities with the shootout in Nuevo León months prior when López Falcón was targeted. On 1 October, security forces raided another of López Salinas' properties in Rancherías, a rural community in Camargo. The property was described as a field house and had a football field. Authorities seized a grenade, six rifles, two handguns, and slightly over 550 kg (1,210 lb) of marijuana inside. The PGR did not dismiss the possibility of raiding more properties owned by López Salinas.

On 3 May 2003, López Falcón was murdered by two gunmen inside a restaurant in Guadalajara, Jalisco. According to investigators, the attack was likely carried out by Los Zetas under Cárdenas Guillén's orders. The police stated that López Salinas was the natural successor to his cousin but that he was at risk of a similar fate. After leaving the Gulf Cartel, López Salinas sided with the Beltrán-Leyva Cartel, a criminal group that formed from the remnants of the Sinaloa Cartel. In 2015, authorities suspected López Salinas had been appointed as head of the Beltrán-Leyva Cartel in Monterrey and San Pedro Garza García by his boss Héctor Huerta Ríos ("La Burra"). He was reportedly appointed to the position to help defeat the forces of Eleazar Medina Rojas ("El Chelelo"), a leader of the Northeast Cartel faction of Los Zetas. According to a source within Mexico's organized investigatory agency SEIDO, López Salinas was referred to by his code name "El 8" in the Beltrán-Leyva Cartel. In San Pedro Garza García, the Beltrán-Leyva Cartel also had a lieutenant known as Eleazar Palomo Castillo ("El Cochi"), who reportedly worked under López Salinas.

== Kidnapping and death ==
On 4 September 2018, López Salinas was kidnapped at the intersection of San Agustín and Monte Everest streets in San Pedro Garza García. Municipal authorities were unsure whether he lived in the city. According to eye-witnesses, the abductors arrived at the scene in three vehicles and forcibly took López Salinas and the car he was driving. López Salinas remained missing for several days. His body was found at around 2:15 a.m. on 15 September after state authorities discovered an abandoned corpse at a parking lot in the neighborhood Colonia Fuentes del Valle. His body was found wrapped in a black plastic bag. On a fence at the scene, his assassins had hung a written message warning other members of his criminal group they would also be killed if they did not surrender. Authorities stated that López Salinas' corpse had visible signs of torture and three gunshot wounds to the head. He suffered asphyxia and had multiple cuts and bruises on his face, neck, legs, and back. After disposing of his body, the assassins were captured driving away by two municipal surveillance cameras. The police did not reveal the car's description to the press.

Initially, authorities were uncertain the deceased was López Salinas; preliminary reports identified the man as an "old-school" crime boss from Miguel Alemán and a border area known as La Ribereña. His body was taken to a hospital in Monterrey without being fully identified. His family officially confirmed his identity upon viewing the corpse. López Salinas was between 65 and 70 years old when he was killed. The police suspected López Salinas was murdered as a result of a turf dispute between cells of the Beltrán-Leyva Cartel in San Pedro Garza García. The message his killers left at the scene identified López Salinas as a member of the faction headed by the cartel leaders Huerta Ríos and Jorge Barrera Lozano ("El Izquierdo"). The message also mentioned several other suspected cartel members, including Ray García, Jaime Garza, and three people referred to by their aliases; "El Negro", "El Veneno", and "El Sonrics". (Note: Three criminal leaders who operated in Nuevo León under those aliases were Héctor Saldaña Perales ("El Negro"), Arnesio Leal ("El Veneno"), and Miguel Ábrego Nava ("El Sonrics").) According to the police, the murder was likely ordered by José Rodolfo Villarreal Hernández ("El Gato"), another cartel leader and rival to López Salinas' faction.

The city's mayor Mauricio Fernández Garza spoke to the press the following day and expressed his opinion of the incident. He warned the press López Salinas' murder was likely the start of a turf dispute between factions of the Beltrán-Leyva Cartel for the control of San Pedro Garza García. He also said it was probably linked to changes in the municipal government because it was his last month as mayor, which possibly provoked the Beltrán-Leyva Cartel into reorganizing its leadership structure and to kill López Salinas. He expected the city would likely experience more drug-related violence under the new administration. Fernández declined to give details about the murder. The mayor-elect Miguel Bernardo Treviño de Hoyos declined to speak to the press about the murder and its possible aftermath.

== See also ==
- Mexican drug war

== Bibliography ==
- Ravelo, Ricardo (2012). Osiel: Vida y tragedia de un capo (in Spanish). Penguin Random House. ISBN 978-6073107716.
- Osorno, Diego Enrique (2011). El cártel de Sinaloa (in Spanish). Penguin Random House. ISBN 978-6073102346.
- Brook, John Lee (2016). Blood+death: The Secret History of Santa Muerte and the Mexican Drug Cartels. SCB Distributors. ISBN 978-1909394223.
- Grayson, George W.; Logan, Samuel (2012). The Executioner's Men: Los Zetas, Rogue Soldiers, Criminal Entrepreneurs, and the Shadow State They Created. Transaction Publishers. ISBN 978-1412846172.
- Astorga Almanza, Luis Alejandro (2007). Seguridad, traficantes y militares: el poder y la sombra (in Spanish). Tusquets Editores. ISBN 978-9706991768. OCLC 181194619.
