= Gilberto Lerma Plata =

Mexican drug lord

- Born: Gilberto Lerma Plata; 1962 or 1963 (age 63–64)
- Occupations: Police chief; Drug lord
- Employers: Tamaulipas State Police (1993–2012); Gulf Cartel
- Criminal charge: Drug trafficking
- Criminal penalty: 151 months
- Criminal status: Convicted

Notes
- Served sentence at the Federal Correctional Institution in Beaumont, Texas; released in January 2022

Gilberto Lerma Plata (born 1962/1963) is a Mexican former police chief and convicted drug lord. He began his career in 1993 as a police officer in the Tamaulipas State Police when his cousin Manuel Cavazos Lerma became Governor of Tamaulipas. Lerma Plata was eventually promoted to police commander in Reynosa and Miguel Alemán. In the late 1990s, while still working for the police, Lerma Plata joined the Gulf Cartel, a criminal group based in Tamaulipas, for whom he facilitated drug trafficking operations from Mexico to the US, coordinated cash smuggling operations, and aided in the procurement of firearms.

In 2011, Lerma Plata was indicted by the United States District Court for the District of Columbia for cocaine and marijuana trafficking, but the indictment remained initially sealed in court. In 2012, he attempted to cross the US–Mexico border to visit family members in Texas and was arrested by US officials, as he was unaware of the charges he faced in the US. In 2013, he pleaded guilty to marijuana trafficking and was later sentenced to 151 months in prison. He was also ordered to forfeit US$10 billion in drug proceeds. Lerma Plata served part of his sentence at the Federal Correctional Institution in Beaumont, Texas, and was released in January 2022.

== Early life and career ==
Gilberto Lerma Plata was born in 1962 or 1963. He started his career as a police officer in the Tamaulipas State Police in 1993 when his cousin Manuel Cavazos Lerma from the Institutional Revolutionary Party (PRI) became Governor of Tamaulipas. (Note: According to one local newspaper in Tamaulipas, Lerma Plata was not related to Cavazos Lerma. The newspaper reportedly interviewed Cavazos Lerma's family members, who clarified that they had a relative named Gilberto Lema Plata but that he had died in Ciudad Victoria, Tamaulipas in 2010. Various US officials who were not authorized to speak to the press stated that Lerma Plata was indeed a relative of Cavazos Lerma.) He was eventually promoted to commander in Reynosa before being transferred to head the force in Miguel Alemán, a post that also included the municipalities of Mier and Guerrero. In the late 1990s, while still employed by the state police, Lerma Plata joined the Gulf Cartel, a criminal group based in Tamaulipas. According to security forces, Lerma Plata was on the Gulf Cartel's payroll and used his authority as a police officer to facilitate drug trafficking operations. Two police officers who eventually joined the cartel, Samuel Flores Borrego and Aurelio Cano Flores, worked under him in the state police. Both of them would eventually become high-ranking cartel members.

According to the US government, Lerma Plata became involved in drug trafficking operations since 1998 and was active continuously until 2001. During this period, he received bribery payments from La Compañía (English: The Company), a name that collectively referred to the co-organization of the Gulf Cartel and its former paramilitary group Los Zetas, in exchange for protection of their operations in Miguel Alemán. Leaked reports from Mexico's Attorney General's Office (PGR) stated that the bribery payments received by Lerma Plata were used to pay politicians in Tamaulipas. In La Compañía, Lerma Plata was part of a vast network of political and police informants that included federal, state and local police chiefs. These corrupt policemen helped facilitate the cartel's drug trafficking operations, as well as expanding their business portfolio to flourish in other criminal activities like kidnappings, human smuggling, oil theft, extortion, and piracy, among others.

In or around 2006, Lerma Plata intended to smuggle 5 kg (11 lb) or more of cocaine and 1,000 kg (2,200 lb) or more of marijuana from Mexico to the US. This information was detailed in the 29 July 2011 United States District Court for the District of Columbia (DDC) indictment against him. In the indictment, US authorities described how they intercepted approximately fourteen phone conversations between Lerma Plata and Flores Borrego, where they discussed cocaine and marijuana shipments, procurement of firearms (specifically AK-47s and AR-15s), and cash smuggling operations for the Gulf Cartel and Los Zetas. These topics were often covered simultaneously in the same phone conversations, and US authorities stated that this meant that the crimes were concurrent and should not be examined separately in court. The indictment stated that Lerma Plata helped procure weapons for the cartel to facilitate their drug operations and that he was involved in money laundering. Mexican intelligence reports stated that the leader of the Gulf Cartel, Osiel Cárdenas Guillén, had direct contact with corrupt officials from state and federal police in Tamaulipas to provide the cartel with information on law enforcement's actions. Lerma Plata was responsible for communicating with commanders from the Tamaulipas State Police and the Federal Preventive Police (PFP) stationed in Miguel Alemán, Camargo, Valle Hermoso, San Fernando, and Ciudad Victoria, to coordinate with the Gulf Cartel.

In addition, the indictment stated that US authorities had a "cooperating witness" who worked for the Gulf Cartel and was willing to testify against Lerma Plata in court. According to his declarations, the unnamed witness met Lerma Plata in Miguel Alemán in 1998 and confirmed he was the head of the local police force. He stated that both of them worked together arranging bribery payments to ensure that the cartel was not interrupted by law enforcement crackdowns while conducting drug trafficking operations. He stated that he paid Lerma Plata between US$15,000 to US$20,000 a year to allow him to move marijuana through the Miguel Alemán corridor. Moreover, the witness had information about Flores Borrego's role in Lerma Plata's schemes and confirmed that Flores Borrego worked under Lerma Plata by providing protection to the cartel as a policeman. He also provided personal details of Florres Borrego's relationship with Lerma Plata, including the fact that Lerma Plata was the godfather of one Flores Borrego's children.

== Arrest and conviction ==
On 6 April 2012, (Note: Another source confused the date with 9 May 2012.) Lerma Plata was arrested by US authorities while crossing the McAllen–Hidalgo–Reynosa International Bridge from Mexico. He was crossing to the US to visit his family in the Rio Grande Valley on Good Friday but was arrested after a US official ran his information in their database and was notified that he was wanted by the DDC for drug trafficking charges. Lerma Plata was unaware of his charges in the US at the moment of his arrest because the charges against him were in a sealed indictment. The indictment was unsealed on 9 April. Lerma Plata appeared at the United States District Court for the Southern District of Texas in McAllen for an initial court hearing the following day.

An identity and bond hearing session was planned to be held on 12 April in McAllen. However, Lerma Plata's Brownsville-based attorney Noe Garza Jr. waived the identity session. He asked the judge to move his initial hearing until Lerma Plata was transferred to Washington, DC, where he would formally face his drug trafficking charges. Garza said that he planned to represent Lerma Plata after he was transferred from Texas to Washington, DC. On 13 April, he appeared before Magistrate Judge Peter Ormsby in McAllen for his initial hearing. Lerma Plata remained silent throughout the entire session as the judge read the charges against him; more than a dozen of his family members and several Mexican journalists were present in the courtroom. Since Lerma Plata was an American citizen, (Note: Besides holding US citizenship, Lerma Plata was cited as a Brownsville, Texas, resident in 2012.) he legally had the right to bail. However, in order for a bail to be considered, details from the prosecution's case would have to be openly presented in court. Once the session concluded, the US Department of Justice (DOJ) and the Drug Enforcement Administration (DEA) refused to comment on the case. Garza stated he was not in the liberty to discuss the background of his client.

The prosecution consisted of the trial attorneys Adrián Rosales and Darrin McCullough, who were part of the DOJ's Narcotic and Dangerous Drug Section (NDDS). Both the DEA field office in Houston, Texas, and the DEA's Bilateral Investigations Unit participated in the investigation against Lerma Plata. Instead of going to trial, DOJ attorney Mythili Raman and DEA administrator Michele Leonhart announced that Lerma Plata had pleaded guilty before US District Judge Colleen Kollar-Kotelly on 1 March 2013 to international marijuana trafficking. "As a Mexican police officer, [Lerma Plata] was supposed to protect the public from harm. Instead, he abused his power to further the notorious Gulf Cartel's violent narcotics trafficking operations," Raman said in the DOJ press release. Leonhart stated that Lerma Plata used violence, intimidation, and corruption to further the Gulf Cartel's drug trafficking capacity, and stated that the DEA would continue to be "aggressive" in their crackdown on the Gulf Cartel and other criminal groups who "harm neighborhoods and communities" in the US and Mexico.

On 24 October 2013, Lerma Plata was sentenced to 151 months in prison (roughly 12.5 years) by Kollar-Kotelly for the marijuana trafficking charges. In addition to his sentence, he was ordered to forfeit US$10 billion in drug profits. This amount was decided after the prosecution proved that this was the gross profit amount the Gulf Cartel made in sales between 2006 and 2011. During this period, the cartel smuggled roughly 1,400,000 kg (3,100,000 lb) of cocaine and 8,000 metric tons of marijuana from Mexico to the US. In the sentencing announcement, Raman stated that Lerma Plata used his police duties against the public good and to further his own interests. "Today, this former crime fighter will start serving his prison sentence alongside the cartel members he assisted and will be required to forfeit 10 billion dollars in ill-gotten gains – a fitting end to his criminal career," Raman stated. Lerma Plata did not appeal the sentence and was given credit for time already served in US custody.

=== Aftermath ===
On 29 July 2019, Lerma Plata issued a motion to the DDC to reduce his sentence by two levels of offense. He was originally sentenced under a US Federal Sentencing Guideline that ranged between 151 and 188 months in prison. He was requesting for it to be revised for a range between 121 and 151 months. The federal sentencing guidelines were changed in the US after his conviction. His defense used that to argue that Lerma Plata was eligible for a new sentencing range (since his original offense fell under the 121 and 151-month range in the new revision). His defense also argued that Lerma Plata was a low-level Gulf Cartel member who was on their payroll for supplying them with information for their drug operations but who was not directly involved in a large drug conspiracy. The court admitted that although Lerma Plata may not have been a high-ranking cartel leader, he abused the trust and power given to him as a police commander. They also stated that Lerma Plata knew high-ranking cartel leaders in person and was once introduced to one of them as "one of us". He was also given a Christmas bonus for his work with the cartel.

The court, however, commended Lerma Plata for his good conduct during his imprisonment. They acknowledged that he had a clean record, was working inside the prison, and had taken over 40 classes since 2014. However, although the court stated that Lerma Plata was showing signs of commitment to change his life, the circumstances of his crimes and the seriousness of the offenses were not enough to reduce his sentence. In addition, the court reminded Lerma Plata that he agreed that his 151-month conviction was appropriate when he was originally sentenced. Given these factors, Lerma Plata's request was denied by Kollar-Kotelly. Lerma Plata was imprisoned at the Federal Correctional Institution in Beaumont, Texas, and was initially expected to be released on 22 March 2023. However, he was released from prison in January 2022 and reportedly lives at his Brownsville residence.

== See also ==
- Mexican drug war

== Bibliography ==
- Cedillo, Juan Alberto (2018). Las guerras ocultas del narco (in Spanish). Penguin Random House. ISBN 978-6073171038.
- Correa-Cabrera, Guadalupe (2017). Los Zetas Inc.: Criminal Corporations, Energy, and Civil War in Mexico. University of Texas Press. ISBN 978-1477312773.
- Deibert, Michael (2014). In the Shadow of Saint Death: The Gulf Cartel and the Price of America's Drug War in Mexico. Rowman & Littlefield. ISBN 978-1493010653.
- Grayson, George W. (2013). The Cartels: The Story of Mexico's Most Dangerous Criminal Organizations and Their Impact on U.S. Security. Greenwood Publishing Group. ISBN 978-1440829864.
