= Juan Carlos de la Cruz Reyna =

Mexican criminal (born 1974/75)

- Born: Juan Carlos de la Cruz Reyna; 1974 or 1975 (age 51–52); Matamoros, Tamaulipas, Mexico
- Employers: Tamaulipas State Police (1990s); Gulf Cartel; Los Zetas
- Criminal charges: Assault; Bribery
- Criminal status: 135-month conviction (2012)

Notes
- Served US sentence at the Federal Correctional Institution in Big Spring, Texas. Released and re-arrested in Mexico.

Juan Carlos de la Cruz Reyna (born 1974/1975) is a Mexican convicted criminal and former high-ranking member of the Gulf Cartel, a criminal group based in Tamaulipas, Mexico. He was also a senior member in Los Zetas, the Gulf Cartel's former paramilitary group. In the 1990s, de la Cruz Reyna was an officer in the Tamaulipas State Police while working as a hitman for the Gulf Cartel. After he left the agency in 1999, he became a bodyguard for former Gulf Cartel kingpin Osiel Cárdenas Guillén, and was eventually promoted to regional leader of the cartel in Tampico. He reportedly had policemen on his payroll, and managed international drug trafficking shipments from Central and South America.

In 1999, de la Cruz Reyna and his associates threatened two U.S. agents at gunpoint in Matamoros after they had traveled there with an informant to gather intelligence on the Gulf Cartel's operations. The agents returned to the U.S. unharmed, but this incident triggered a massive manhunt for him. De la Cruz Reyna was arrested in 2007 and extradited to the U.S., where he was convicted of assaulting the two agents. Expecting to be released in 2012, de la Cruz Reyna attempted to bribe an undercover agent to ensure he was released to members of the Gulf Cartel upon his return to Mexico. He later pleaded guilty to charges of bribery and received a sentence of slightly more than an additional 11 more years in prison. He was released from US prison in October 2021 and deported to Mexico, where he was taken into custody by Mexican officials.

== Early life and career ==
Juan Carlos de la Cruz Reyna was born in Matamoros, Tamaulipas, Mexico in 1974 or 1975. At some point, between 1995 and 1996, he joined the Tamaulipas State Police. According to information from the Attorney General's Office (PGR), while de la Cruz Reyna served as a police officer, he also worked as a hitman for the Gulf Cartel, a criminal group based in Tamaulipas. Under the leadership of former kingpin Osiel Cárdenas Guillén, the Gulf Cartel recruited several law enforcement agents to further their drug trafficking operations and conduct killings on their behalf. (Note: A police commander who worked in the state force during de la Cruz Reyna's tenure, Carlos Landín Martínez, was also recruited by the Gulf Cartel. He was eventually promoted to regional leader of Reynosa, Tamaulipas.) De la Cruz Reyna reported to Jorge Eduardo Costilla Sánchez ("El Coss"), a former high-ranking Gulf Cartel leader. He was released from the agency on 31 May 1999. When he joined the cartel full-time, de la Cruz Reyna was part of two Gulf Cartel subgroups known as the Sierras and the Tangos. Costilla Sánchez and Víctor Manuel Vázquez Mireles ("El Meme") headed these groups. Its members used aliases and codes to ensure their anonymity. De la Cruz Reyna had several aliases, including "El JC", "Tango 36", "JC Tango", "La Torta", "La Chona", and "Z-36".

On 9 November 1999, de la Cruz Reyna and several of his associates, including Cárdenas Guillén, threatened two U.S. agents at gunpoint in Matamoros. The agents had traveled there with an informant to gather intelligence on the Gulf Cartel's operations but were intercepted by the criminal group. During the standoff, Cárdenas Guillén threatened to kill the U.S. agents and the informant, but they were allowed to return to the U.S. unharmed after a heated discussion. This incident led to increased law enforcement efforts against the Gulf Cartel's leadership. Following this incident, de la Cruz Reyna became one of the most-wanted criminals in the U.S. and Mexico. On 14 March 2000, the United States District Court for the Southern District of Texas (S.D. Tex.) in Brownsville filed a sealed indictment against de la Cruz Reyna for assaulting the two agents. The indictment was unsealed on 14 December 2000. On 9 April 2002, de la Cruz Reyna was included in a superseding indictment for the assault charges. For these charges de la Cruz Reyna faced up to 10 years in prison, up to US$250,000 in fines, and three years of supervised release for each count.

In 2003, the PGR identified de la Cruz Reyna as a direct collaborator of Cárdenas Guillén, and listed him as a senior member within Los Zetas, the Gulf Cartel's former paramilitary group. That same year, the U.S. government formally issued an extradition request to the Mexican government. It asked that de la Cruz be transferred to the U.S. should he be arrested in Mexico. While in Los Zetas, de la Cruz Reyna worked as one Cárdenas Guillén's bodyguards. He later managed security logistics for him and other Gulf Cartel leaders. Since he worked for the Tamaulipas State Police, he was tasked with informing the Gulf Cartel of law enforcement efforts against them. In addition, he was responsible for coordinating with several police agencies to facilitate Cárdenas Guillén's transportation.

According to several PGR protected witnesses who worked with de la Cruz Reyna and other Gulf Cartel leaders, (Note: The code names of the protected witnesses were "Rufino", "Karen", and "Rafael".) de la Cruz Reyna was responsible for carrying out multiple executions ordered by the cartel's leadership. In 2000, he allegedly assassinated two lawyers who had represented the Gulf Cartel, Miguel Angel Martínez Sánchez and Antonio López Nakazono. He also reportedly ordered attacks against Rolando López Salinas ("El Rolis"), a member of a smuggling group headed by Edelio López Falcón ("El Yeyo"). (Note: Cárdenas Guillén wanted to kill López Falcón and members of his group because he believed reports they gave authorities information that led to the arrest of Gilberto García Mena (alias "El June"), a high-ranking Gulf Cartel leader. López Falcón was killed by Los Zetas in 2003.) The protected witnesses also stated that de la Cruz Reyna participated in the murders of Gulf Cartel leaders Rogelio García García ("El Roger") and Ángel Salvador Gómez Herrera ("Chava Gómez"), and of police officer Gerardo Gazcón Sotero and Commander Jaime Rajid Gutiérrez Arreola.

== Leadership tenure ==
According to intelligence reports, Cárdenas Guillén promoted de la Cruz Reyna to regional leader in Tampico, Tamaulipas in 2001. A PGR-protected witnesses stated his promotion was due to de la Cruz Reyna's background as a police officer, his tenure in the Gulf Cartel, and his perceived level-headedness. As head of Tampico, he coordinated drug trafficking shipments in southern Tamaulipas and northern Veracruz and had at least 300 people under his command. Some of them were suspected to be members of the local police. These suspects helped protect drug shipments from this part of Mexico to the U.S. -Mexico border between the cities of Matamoros and Nuevo Laredo.

While heading operations in Tampico, he was charged with multiple killings and kidnappings. He was a suspect in the murder of Silvestre Bañuelos Alejos, former deputy chief of the Tamaulipas State Police, and in the death of Adolfo Velasco Ramírez, (Note: The Government of Tamaulipas stated that Velasco Ramírez committed suicide. However, critics said the evidence pointed to a homicide.) former police chief in Tampico, both in 2006. In early April 2007, de la Cruz Reyna ordered an attack against law enforcement for a seizure conducted at one of his properties in Tampico. The seizure resulted in multiple weapons, ammunition, tactical gear, and radio communication equipment being confiscated. (Note: In the same source, the date of the seizure varies between 1 and 2 April 2007.) In addition, several protected witnesses who testified against de la Cruz Reyna in Mexico stated that he had officers of the Federal Preventive Police (PFP) on his payroll. They reportedly assisted de la Cruz Reyna's human smuggling and drug trafficking operations in Tampico.

In January 2007, Cárdenas Guillén was extradited to the U.S., affecting the Gulf Cartel's drug operations. After Luis Reyes Enríquez ("El Rex"), a high-ranking leader of Los Zetas, was arrested in June 2007, the Gulf Cartel's leadership transferred de la Cruz Reyna to Mexico City. He was tasked with coordinating cocaine shipments with suppliers in Central and South America. Before buying a house in Coyoacán, a borough of Mexico City, de la Cruz Reyna lived in multiple hotels in the city. He lived a luxurious lifestyle and spent a lot of money on clothes, food, and other expensive activities, which attracted the attention of law enforcement. To disguise himself in Mexico City, he tried to dress casually; in Tamaulipas, his style was rural, and included boots and a cowboy jeans. De la Cruz Reyna traveled many times between Tamaulipas and Mexico City for work, but preferred to conduct negotiations in Mexico City.

== Arrest and aftermath ==
On 28 August 2007, security forces received an anonymous tip that led them to a restaurant in Polanco, Mexico City. There the Special Forces Airmobile Group, the elite unit of the Mexican Army, (Note: Another source stated that the Mexican Army and the SIEDO conducted a joint operation that led to his arrest.) arrested de la Cruz Reyna and eight other suspected drug traffickers. Eyewitnesses stated that de la Cruz Reyna had just paid for his meal and was about to leave when the Army entered the restaurant and conducted the arrest. Most of the other diners had left when the arrest occurred. Through an informant, authorities were kept updated on the suspects' activities inside the restaurant, including their food and drink orders. The government described the incident as a carefully calculated operation; around 30 Army personnel reached the scene in multiple vehicles and surrounded the restaurant and the adjacent premises. Two helicopters flew over the area. Local police assisted by blocking the street and redirecting traffic. Several soldiers went into the restaurant and apprehended the suspects. Later that evening, Mexican authorities arrested two other people who they suspected were involved in de la Cruz Reyna's operations. The location of their arrest was not made public, but they were in possession of an AK-47, and MXN$100,000 (approximately US$9,090 in August 2007) and US$300,000 in cash. No shots were fired during these operations; none of the detainees resisted arrest.

Investigators stated that three of the eight detainees were Colombian nationals and alleged representatives of Colombia's Norte del Valle Cartel. De la Cruz Reyna was in a meeting with them to negotiate drug trafficking shipment details between Colombia and Mexico. This meeting was the result of Reyes Enríquez's capture months earlier; he was suspected of being the Gulf Cartel's main intermediary for their drug suppliers in Colombia. Restaurant personnel stated that the three Colombian nationals had eaten there twenty days earlier. Mexican authorities stated that the Norte del Valle Cartel had operated in Mexico City since 2003 and was looking to receive several concessions from Mexican criminal groups like the Gulf Cartel in exchange for their drug supply. Among the reported concessions was that the Norte del Valle Cartel was to be allowed to conduct money laundering activities in Mexico, and use the country as a gateway to Europe (primarily Spain) for their drug trafficking shipments.

Once in custody, de la Cruz Reyna was sent to Campo Militar 1, a military installation in Mexico City, before he was transferred to the offices of the Subprocuraduría de Investigación Especializada en Delincuencia Organizada (SIEDO), Mexico's organized crime investigation agency. While at the SIEDO offices, de la Cruz Reyna and his accomplices were interrogated and made their first legal declarations. The U.S. government congratulated the administration of Felipe Calderón (2006–2012) and Mexico's law enforcement agencies for the capture. U.S. Ambassador to Mexico Tony Garza said the U.S. government would strengthened its bilateral ties with Mexico to continue combating drug trafficking and organized crime. U.S. authorities also reminded Mexico that de la Cruz Reyna was wanted in the U.S. for the assault of the two agents in 1999. The PGR confirmed that the two U.S. agents recognized de la Cruz Reyna as one of the suspects who threatened them. News of his arrest was published discretely in media outlets in Tamaulipas with the exception of a newspaper in Tampico. This raised suspicions concerning the Gulf Cartel's control over the local press.

De la Cruz Reyna's arrest weakened the Gulf Cartel and led to a series of successful crackdowns by Mexican security forces during the rest of 2007. Authorities were able to arrest members of the Gulf Cartel and Los Zetas in record numbers, as well as seize drugs, money, and weapons. On 6 October 2007, the Mexican Army seized 11.7 short tons (10.4 long tons) of cocaine from the Gulf Cartel in Tampico after a shootout. According to the PGR, this was the largest cocaine seizure in the history of Mexico. In the operation, seven suspected Gulf Cartel traffickers were arrested. On 12 October, Mexico's Secretaría de Seguridad Pública (SSP) (Secretariat of Public Security) arrested 25 officers from the PFP for collaborating with de la Cruz Reyna. (Note: A few days later, nine policemen were released due to lack of evidence. The remaining sixteen were kept in federal custody.) The police were on the Gulf Cartel's payroll and assisted de la Cruz Reyna by notifying the cartel of the government's operatives.

== Imprisonment ==
On 2 September 2007, a federal judge granted authorities a 70-day preventative arrest against de la Cruz Reyna and the suspects arrested with him. This meant that the SIEDO was allowed to keep them for this period at their facilities before they were sent to a maximum-security prison. The SIEDO continued to investigate de la Cruz Reyna and his associates for their alleged participation in organized crime and drug trafficking. That same day, federal Judge Martha Sánchez Alonso granted de la Cruz Reyna's defense constitutional protection preventing his extradition to the U.S. His defense issued two writs of amparo the day of his capture to stop any extradition efforts by the Mexican government. The two writs of amparo were served on the SIEDO and the Secretariat of Foreign Affairs (SRE). One of the amparos also asked the court to prevent de la Cruz Reyna from being kept incommunicado, segregated, or transferred to one of Mexico's maximum-security prisons.

However, on 17 September, de la Cruz Reyna was transferred to the Federal Social Readaptation Center No. 1 (also known as "Altiplano"), a maximum-security prison in Almoloya de Juárez, State of Mexico, with the rest of his accomplices. The transfer was allowed because a State of Mexico court considered the evidence against him to be sufficient and issued an arrest warrant while he was in the SIEDO's custody. On 25 September, a State of Mexico federal court officially charged de la Cruz Reyna with drug trafficking and money laundering after analyzing the evidence presented by the PGR. It stated the charges were sufficient. His accomplices, arrested with him at the restaurant, were charged with the same counts. The two other suspects arrested with firearms were charged with illegal possession of military-exclusive weapons.

Throughout most of 2008, the Mexican government was unable to convict de la Cruz Reyna of the crimes he was suspected of committing. On 21 April, he was nearly released from prison after a judge considered the evidence presented by the plaintiff was insufficient to prove his culpability. The plaintiff was unable to prove that he was guilty of attempted homicide, drug trafficking, and illegal possession of military-exclusive firearms. A few days before his release was to be approved, however, the SIEDO issued another arrest warrant that was accepted by a federal court, which charged de la Cruz Reyna for organized crime involvement. De la Cruz Reyna remained imprisoned. He was among a long list of other suspected organized crime leaders from the Gulf Cartel and other groups like the Sinaloa Cartel, Tijuana Cartel, and the Juárez Cartel who were awaiting trial.

== Extradition and sentence ==
On 31 December 2008, Mexico extradited de la Cruz Reyna to the U.S. along with nine other suspected drug traffickers, including Rubén Sauceda Rivera ("El Cacahuate") and José Manuel Barrientos Rodríguez, two senior members of the Gulf Cartel. The Mexican government stated they extradited de la Cruz Reyna as a sign of commitment to combat transnational organized crime. They confirmed his extradition was approved for the pending indictments he had in the U.S. for assaulting a federal officer. The U.S. government lauded Mexico's efforts and commitment to extradite prisoners to the U.S., and specifically highlighted de la Cruz Reyna's transfer as important. (Note: With this massive transfer of prisoners, Mexico reached a record number of extraditions in a single year. In 2008 alone, Mexico extradited 95 prisoners; the previous year, Mexico extradited 83.) As part of the National Institute for Transparency, Access to Information and Personal Data Protection (INAI), the SRE released the original details of de la Cruz Reyna's extradition for public access in 2013. The INAI also intended to release sensitive details of his case in Mexico, including the law enforcement officials and judges who presided over it, the witnesses who testified against him, the names of his close collaborators, and the victims of his crimes. However, a court decision denied this request.

De la Cruz Reyna was transported from the Matamoros International Airport to Texas. Though he was initially indicted in Brownsville, U.S District Judge Hilda G. Tagle moved his trial to Houston for security reasons. On 31 March 2009, De la Cruz Reyna pleaded guilty to two counts of assault. His attorney said that de la Cruz Reyna was unable to come to an agreement with prosecutors because he did not accept the terms of the plea. Sauceda Rivera, however, entered a plea agreement with the prosecution; he pleaded guilty to one count of money laundering, and the eleven counts of drug trafficking against him were dropped. The money laundering charge carried a sentence of up to 20 years in prison.

During the trial, the prosecution stated that de la Cruz Reyna physically struggled with one of the U.S. agents during the armed standoff, and even tried to open one of the doors of their vehicle to grab them. However, de la Cruz Reyna said the statement was false and claimed he did not know they were U.S. agents when the incident occurred. The defense stated that de la Cruz Reyna was not a major figure in the Gulf Cartel and that he backed off from the standoff as soon as the U.S. agents identified themselves. His lawyer stated that de la Cruz Reyna was simply a bodyguard for the cartel and did not give orders during the standoff. "If they had been three Canadian tourists or Winter Texans, they would have probably been asked, 'Why are you passing by our house so many times?', his attorney told the judge, in reference to the U.S. agents surveillance of Cárdenas Guillén's house the day of the standoff. De la Cruz Reyna was facing up to five years in prison for each assault charge. The sentence also carried a US$250,000 fine and three years of supervised release. On 3 July 2009, de la Cruz Reyna was sentenced to a 2 1/2-year term in prison for the assault charges. His fines were waived because of to his inability to pay them, and he was prohibited from lawfully re-entering the U.S. upon his release. He was imprisoned at the federal penitentiary in Atlanta, Georgia. De la Cruz Reyna was the first person convicted from the Matamoros standoff.

== Bribery scheme and re-arrest ==
On 14 March 2012, the month de la Cruz Reyna was expected to be released from prison, he was re-arrested on bribery charges. According to S.D. Tex. attorney Kenneth Magidson, de la Cruz Reyna and several of his accomplices tried to bribe a U.S. Immigration and Customs Enforcement (ICE) undercover agent to ensure safe passage to Mexico upon his release. They also asked the official to ensure that de la Cruz Reyna's release was not revealed to Mexican authorities, and that he be allowed to see his family while in prison. According to U.S. authorities, around May 2011, de la Cruz Reyna's associate, Julio Torres, began negotiating bribery payments with the undercover agent to arrange for de la Cruz Reyna's release in Matamoros to members of the Gulf Cartel. De la Cruz Reyna was worried that upon his release to Mexico, he faced possible re-arrest by Mexican authorities or capture by rival drug gangs if released in another location in Mexico. The undercover agent was paid US$4,000 to arrange for de la Cruz Reyna's transfer to Texas, and spoke with him over the phone to discuss the payment and arrange for additional payments. (Note: Another source stated that the first payment was US$5,000.)

On 28 June 2011, the undercover agent was introduced to another associate, Adalberto Núñez Venegas, who de la Cruz Reyna appointed to make the future payments on his behalf. Over the course of six months, Torres and Núñez Venegas made eight payments totaling US$542,090 to the undercover agent. They also pledged six properties as collateral for an additional US$460,000 they had agreed with the agent. In September 2011, the undercover agent showed de la Cruz Reyna his identification to prove he was an immigration officer after he had asked to see it. In January 2012, the agent met with de la Cruz Reyna to discuss the final payment and his transfer to Texas. In February 2012, Torres introduced the agent to Carlos Melo, another associate, who said he was aware of the bribery scheme and had agreed to be de la Cruz Reyna's driver.

On 12 March 2012, Gaspar Martínez Montes, another associate involved in the conspiracy, crossed the U.S. -Mexico border with US$134,003 and told customs officials the money was to be used to purchase items for his business. That day, he met with Torres and Juan Trejo Venegas, another associate, and delivered a US$250,010 payment to the undercover agent. The following day, the agent met with Torres, Melo, Núñez Venegas, Martínez Montes, Trejo Venegas, and another associate José Cruz Venegas Esquivel, to discuss the logistics of de la Cruz Reyna's release. Torres and Melo told the agent they would transport de la Cruz Reyna in one vehicle, and that Núñez Venegas and Venegas Esquivel would escort them in another.

On 14 March, a group of ICE agents arrested six of the conspirators at gunpoint inside a restaurant in Brownsville. Witnesses stated that the officers arrived at the restaurant in unmarked police cars and raided the patio where the conspirators were dining; De la Cruz Reyna was re-arrested in a Rio Grande Valley penitentiary. He had been transferred there from Bayview, Texas, after arriving from Atlanta on 9 March. Three of the conspirators appeared before U.S. Magistrate Judge Ronald G. Morgan for an initial hearing on 16 March. The rest waived their preliminary hearings on 20 March, but Morgan ordered all of them held without bond in federal custody because he believed their close ties to Mexico meant they were flight risks. By the end of the scheme, the bribery payments totalled nearly US$800,000. (Note: According to one FBI source, the total payments were US$796,100. Other sources from the FBI had the figure at US$797,000.)

=== Conviction ===
On 10 April 2012, the conspirators were indicted in Brownsville on bribery charges. They appeared in court again on 18 April, and each of them pleaded not guilty separately. Morgan scheduled a pre-trial hearing on 29 May and jury selection for 31 May. On 23 April, de la Cruz Reyna, Núñez Venegas, Trejo Venegas, and Venegas Esquivel, pleaded guilty to the bribery charges. On 8 May, Torres and Montes Martínez pleaded guilty. On 18 May, the last conspirator, Melo, also pleaded guilty. Some of them entered a plea agreement to receive lower sentences. De la Cruz Reyna entered a blind plea, which mean that he did not finalize the sentence he was to receive for pleading guilty. The bribery charge carried up to 15 years in prison, a US$250,000 fine, and three years of supervised release.

On 8 October 2012, Judge Hanan sentenced de la Cruz Reyna to 135 months, slightly over 11 years, in prison for bribery. He was also ordered to pay US$100,000 in fines. The other conspirators, Torres, Melo, Montes Martínez, Trejo Venegas, and Venegas Esquivel, were sentenced to 120, 84, 46, 46, and 24 months, respectively. Núñez Venegas was sentenced to 66 months in January 2013. During his sentence, de la Cruz Reyna apologized for his crime, and stated that he tried to bribe the agent to protect his life upon his release to Mexico. He said he had no intention of rejoining the Gulf Cartel and wanted to apologize to his family and children in person. The defense team complained that the undercover agent upped the payment amounts for "sentencing entrapment" to increase the length of de la Cruz Reyna's jail sentence.

However, Assistant U.S. Attorney Jody Young stated that each of the payments were made for specific things de la Cruz Reyna requested, and they were made to establish good faith with those involved. Young stated that the money used in the conspiracy derived from the proceeds of the Gulf Cartel's drug dealings. Hanen stated that he believed the defendants knew that the official they were trying to bribe was a high-ranking officer in the agency. Otherwise, he said they would not have paid the large sums of money they did to get de la Cruz Reyna released on his specific terms.

== Deportation and re-arrest ==
On 23 April 2013, de la Cruz Reyna issued a request to the U.S. Department of Justice asking to be sent to Mexico to fulfill the remainder of his sentence through the International Prisoner Transfer Program. He was imprisoned at the Federal Correctional Institution in Big Spring, Texas, and his expected release date was on 14 October 2021. On 19 October 2021, US federal agents deported de la Cruz Reyna to Mexico through a port of entry in Nuevo Laredo. Mexican authorities took him into custody as he crossed the international border. In Mexico, de la Cruz Reyna faced outstanding charges for drug trafficking and money laundering for an organized crime group.

== See also ==
- Mexican drug war

== Bibliography ==
- Ravelo, Ricardo (2012). Osiel: Vida y tragedia de un capo (in Spanish). Penguin Random House. ISBN 978-6073107716.
- Grayson, George W.; Logan, Samuel (2012). The Executioner's Men: Los Zetas, Rogue Soldiers, Criminal Entrepreneurs, and the Shadow State They Created. Transaction Publishers. ISBN 978-1412846172.
- Grayson, George W. (2016). The Impact of President Felipe Calderón's War on Drugs in the Armed Forces: The Prospects for Mexico's 'Militarization' and Bilateral Relations. Lulu Press. ISBN 978-1304056962.
