= Óscar Guerrero =

Óscar Guerrero may refer to:

- Óscar Guerrero Silva (1971-2004), Mexican drug lord
- Óscar Guerrero (footballer) (born 1985), Colombian footballer
