= Eduardo Garza Rivas =

Don Eduardo Garza Rivas LLD (October 13, 1933 – May 24, 2009) was the director of the Institute of Mediation of the State Justice in Mexico (PGJE). He was rector of Universidad Autónoma de Tamaulipas and president of the Supreme Justice Tribunal and president of the Commission on Human Rights.
