= Mier Municipality =

Mier
- Municipality
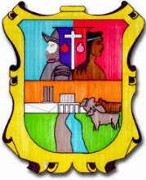
- Coat of arms

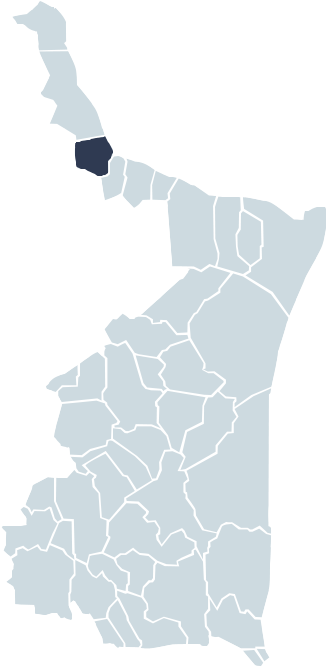
- Municipality of Mier in Tamaulipas
- Country: Mexico
- State: Tamaulipas
- Founded: 1825
- Named for: Servando Teresa de Mier
- Seat: Ciudad Mier
- Largest city: Ciudad Mier

Population (2010)
  - Total: 4,762

Mier Municipality is one of the municipalities of Tamaulipas, Mexico. The seat is at Ciudad Mier. According to the 2010 census, the entire population of the municipality resides in the municipal seat, as both have an official count of 4,762 inhabitants. There were 172 localities enumerated during the census, and all but Mier showed a population of zero.

== Adjacent municipalities and counties ==
- Miguel Alemán Municipality - southeast
- Los Aldamas Municipality, Nuevo León - south
- General Treviño Municipality, Nuevo León - south
- Agualeguas Municipality, Nuevo León - west
- Parás Municipality, Nuevo León - west
- Guerrero Municipality - northwest
- Starr County, Texas - east
