= Braulio Arellano Domínguez =

Mexican drug trafficker

- Died: 3 November 2009; Soledad de Doblado, Veracruz, Mexico
- Cause of death: Gunshot wounds
- Other names: Z-20; El Gonzo
- Organization(s): Mexican Army (1993–1999); Los Zetas (1999–2009)

Braulio Arellano Domínguez (died 4 November 2009) was a Mexican drug trafficker who was one of the founders of the Mexican criminal organization known as Los Zetas with other military men in the late 1990s.

He joined the Mexican Army in 1993, but deserted six years later in June 1999. He was later recruited by the Gulf Cartel to work as an enforcer for the drug trafficking organization's new muscle, Los Zetas. As one of the top leaders of the group, Arellano Domínguez commanded Los Zetas in the coastal state of Veracruz. While operating in the state, he reportedly met with the former state Governor Fidel Herrera Beltrán on at least two occasions. Though the information has not been officially confirmed, the accusations against the politician persist.

Following a gunfight with Mexican law enforcement in Soledad de Doblado, Veracruz on 3 November 2009, Arellano Domínguez died from gunshot wound complications. According to the Mexican Navy, the drug lord attempted to defend himself in the shootout with a golden pistol encrusted with diamonds.

== Criminal career ==
Arellano Domínguez joined the Mexican Army on 22 February 1993, but deserted on 21 June 1999 and later joined Los Zetas, the former armed wing of the drug trafficking organization known as the Gulf Cartel, which was headed by the imprisoned Osiel Cárdenas Guillén. He was briefly trained by the US Army at the School of the Americas at Fort Benning, Georgia in 1996. Los Zetas is a criminal organization that was formed in the late 1990s and early 2000s by soldiers who left the Mexican military to work as the muscle of the Gulf Cartel. Arellano Domínguez, along with at least 40 other soldiers, is considered one of the original founders of Los Zetas. He also served as the cartel's leader in Veracruz state. In order to go undetected by law enforcement, he reportedly hid in Veracruz disguised as a businessman from Córdoba, Veracruz.

=== Political corruption ===
According to the testimony of 14 protected witnesses, Arellano Domínguez is alleged to have maintained some kind of business relationship with former Veracruz Governor Fidel Herrera Beltrán. Their first meeting reportedly took place in Chicontepec de Tejeda, where someone captured a picture of the former governor and the drug lord. The second meeting supposedly took place inside a hotel in Coatzacoalcos in 2008. There have been many accusations against Herrera Beltrán, who left office in December 2010. Although his term lived a period of relative peace in the state of Veracruz, adversaries have accused him of protecting the Los Zetas drug cartel and permitting them to operate in Veracruz. The former governor, however, has "energetically rejected" the accusations.

=== Death ===
Infantry soldiers of the Mexican Navy engaged in a shootout with gunmen of Los Zetas in Soledad de Doblado, Veracruz on 3 November 2009, where Arellano Domínguez was critically wounded. On his way to the hospital, however, Arellano Domínguez died from complications from the gunshot wounds. According to Navy reports, Arellano Domínguez had used a golden M1911 pistol encrusted with his aliases El Gonzo and Z-20 in diamonds. In the clash, the authorities confiscated five vehicles, four motorcycles, an MP5 submachine gun, a grenade, four pistols, and seven magazines. They also found several radio communication equipment, three bags of cocaine and pills, and 74,900 pesos (about US$5,909) and US$107. Prior to his death, he was regarded by the Office of the General Prosecutor (PGR) as one of the most-wanted Mexican criminals and a top Zeta leader.

Two days after his death, organized crime members killed Casto Acevedo Manzano, a former Mexican Army major and delegate of Public Security in Veracruz. His corpse was mutilated by organized crime members and dumped on a street in Soledad de Doblado. Through a written message alongside his corpse, the Gulf Cartel (who at that time worked with Los Zetas) took credit for the execution.

== See also ==
- Mexican drug war
