= Jose Rodolfo Villarreal-Hernandez =

Mexican drug cartel boss (born 1978)

FBI Ten Most Wanted Fugitive
- Charges: Interstate Stalking; Conspiracy to Commit Murder-for-Hire
- Reward: $1,000,000
- Alias: "El Gato"

Description
- Born: January 16, 1978 (age 48); Mexico
- Gender: Male
- Height: 5 ft 4 in (163 cm)
- Weight: 165 lb (75 kg)

Status
- Added: October 13, 2020
- Caught: January 7, 2023
- Number: 524
- Captured

José Rodolfo Villarreal-Hernández (born January 16, 1978) is a Mexican drug cartel boss and former fugitive who was added to the FBI Ten Most Wanted Fugitives list on October 13, 2020. He was wanted for orchestrating the murder of Juan Jesús Guerrero Chapa, which was carried out on May 22, 2013, in Southlake, Texas. He is also believed to be responsible for numerous murders in Mexico. Villarreal-Hernandez was the 524th fugitive to be placed on the FBI's Ten Most Wanted Fugitives list. He replaced Santiago Villalba Mederos. The United States Department of State's Transnational Organized Crime Rewards Program offered a reward of up to $1 million for information leading directly to his arrest. He was captured on January 7, 2023. On February 27, 2025, he was extradited to the United States.

== Background ==
Villarreal-Hernandez was born in Mexico on January 16, 1978. He was a leader of the Beltrán-Leyva Cartel. A few years prior to the 2013 murder of Juan Jesús Guerrero Chapa, Villarreal-Hernandez's father was murdered by the Gulf Cartel, a rival cartel to the Beltrán-Leyva, with whom they had an ongoing feud. Guerrero, who was a lawyer, was reportedly associated with the Gulf Cartel, and represented the Gulf Cartel leader Osiel Cárdenas Guillén. Villarreal-Hernandez blamed Guerrero personally for the death of his father and sought revenge.

== Murder of Juan Jesús Guerrero Chapa ==
Villarreal-Hernandez hired a crew to assassinate Guerrero. By May 2013, Guerrero was living in Southlake, Texas, and was now a U.S. informant who was cooperating with law enforcement. Because of this, he was allowed to live legally in the United States. Villarreal-Hernandez sent a crew from Mexico to track and locate Guerrero. He was eventually located and found to be living in Southlake.

On the evening of May 22, 2013, two hitmen working for Villarreal-Hernandez, known only as Clorox and Captain, tracked Guerrero and his wife in their vehicle, as they drove to Southlake Town Square. Around 6:47 p.m., Guerrero climbed into the front passenger seat of his burgundy Range Rover while his wife placed bags into the back of the vehicle. The two assassins, driving a white Toyota Sequoia, pulled up behind them. The passenger exited the vehicle wearing a hoodie and a bandanna and fired multiple rounds from a 9mm handgun at Guerrero. Guerrero was shot in his side and back before slumping motionless against the front seats. The shooter returned to the car and the assassins escaped. Guerrero was rushed to a local hospital where he was pronounced dead. His wife escaped the shooting unharmed.

== Investigation ==
Three men who were connected to the assassination plot have since been arrested for their involvement in the crime. The two assassins remain at large. According to witness testimony, Guerrero's sister took revenge against Villarreal-Hernandez by having one of his relatives beheaded. He was then sent a video of the severed head.

Villarreal-Hernandez remained in hiding and was wanted by the FBI for interstate stalking and conspiracy to commit murder-for-hire. He was believed to be hiding in Mexico. A reward of up to $1 million was available for information leading to his arrest.

Villarreal-Hernandez was arrested in Atizapán de Zaragoza, Mexico, on January 7, 2023.

== Extradition to the United States ==
On February 27, 2025, Villarreal-Hernandez along with 28 other narco figures were extradited to the United States.

== See also ==
- List of fugitives from justice who disappeared
