= Óscar Guerrero Silva =

Mexican drug lord (1971–2004)

- Born: 1971; Reynosa, Tamaulipas, Mexico
- Died: 1 February 2004 (aged 33); Guadalupe, Nuevo León, Mexico
- Cause of death: Suicide
- Other names: Z-8; El Winnie Pooh
- Organization(s): Mexican Army (1992–1999); Los Zetas (1999–2004)

Óscar Eduardo Guerrero Silva (1971 – 1 February 2004), commonly referred to by his alias Z-8 and/or The Winnie Pooh, was a Mexican drug lord and high-ranking leader of Los Zetas, a Mexican criminal organization.

Shortly after marrying, Guerrero Silva joined the Mexican Army in early 1992 and became an infantry soldier. After being promoted to corporal the following year, he deserted from the military in 1999, and began to work as an assassin for the Los Zetas and Gulf Cartel, a drug trafficking organization, along with other ex-soldiers. His life as an outlaw overwhelmed him, and he later committed suicide through a self-inflicted gunshot wound.

== Criminal career ==
Óscar Eduardo Guerrero Silva was born in Reynosa, Tamaulipas around the year 1971, and joined the Mexican Army on 28 January 1992 as an infantry soldier. The following year, he was promoted to corporal. Nonetheless, he eventually deserted from the Armed Forces in 1999 and was recruited by the drug trafficking organization known as the Gulf Cartel, becoming one of the 50 most-wanted criminals in Mexico during his time.

He was recruited along with several other soldiers of the Mexican Army in the late 1990s by Osiel Cárdenas Guillén, the former leader of the Gulf Cartel, to work as hired assassins and bodyguards, where he earned the alias Z-8. The newly formed group founded by Guerrero Silva and other ex-soldiers became known as Los Zetas, and they were highly trained and equipped, enticed with greater salaries than in the Army. Los Zetas continued to expand by hiring former police officers and gang members alike, and diversified their criminal agenda aggressively by including kidnappings, extortions, oil theft, piracy, and other rackets into their revenue, instead of focusing solely on the international narcotics trade.

In December 2002, gunmen of Los Zetas and the Gulf Cartel wearing police uniforms raided a prison in Matamoros, Tamaulipas and liberated three men accused of drug trafficking and a woman imprisoned for homicide. The Mexican authorities alleged that Guerrero Silva was involved in the raid. Later on in January 2004, Apatzingán, Michoacán was the scene of a massive prison break when over 50 uniformed gunmen of Los Zetas, including Guerrero Silva, stormed several prison cells and liberated at least 25 inmates, including several high-ranking drug lords of the Gulf Cartel, in less than 15 minutes.

Guerrero Silva was known for having one of the most bizarre and unique Mexican criminal nicknames, Winnie Pooh, but he was "hardly a lovable bear".

=== Death ===
On 1 February 2004, elements of the now defunct Federal Investigative Agency (AFI) raided a residence at the Riveras del Río neighborhood in Guadalupe, Nuevo León, near the city of Monterrey, and discovered the corpse of Guerrero Silva.

His temple had a gunshot wound from a 9mm pistol, suggesting that his death was an apparent suicide. Guerrero Silva was reportedly overwhelmed after the Mexican authorities had him under surveillance and because he believed his own accomplices were going to betray him.

== Personal life and family ==
Gilberto López Barrera, the brother-in-law of Guerrero Silva and a member of the Gulf Cartel, was arrested in downtown Monterrey on 22 May 2005 and charged with a number of crimes. He is the brother of Ivonne López Barrera, a former romantic partner of Guerrero Silva.

In 1990, two years before joining the Mexican Army, Guerrero Silva married Gabriela Cervantes Zamorano. Both of them stopped seeing each other in 1997, and his wife later found out that he had deserted the military and was working for Los Zetas. Gabriela recalls that Guerrero Silva would send her money and call her on the phone every now and then, but that he seemed uninterested in their matrimony. Although married to Gabriela, Guerrero Silva had a romantic relationship with another woman, which explains why he visited Guadalupe, Nuevo León from Reynosa, Tamaulipas (his actual residence) periodically.

== See also ==
- Mexican drug war

== Sources ==
=== Bibliography ===
- Grayson, George W. (2010). Mexico: Narco-Violence and a Failed State?. Transaction Publishers. p. 291. ISBN 978-1412811514.
