= Miguel Alemán Municipality =

Miguel Alemán
- Municipality

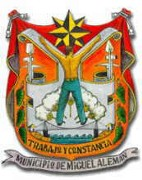
- Coat of arms

- Location within Mexico
- Coordinates: 26°14′0″N 99°14′0″W
- Country: Mexico
- State: Tamaulipas
- Municipal seat: Ciudad Miguel Alemán
- Founded: October 11, 1950

Population (2010)
  - Total: 27,015
- Climate: BSh

Miguel Alemán Municipality is a municipality located in the Mexican state of Tamaulipas.
