= Tamaulipas State Guard =

Tamaulipas State Guard Guardia Estatal de Tamaulipas
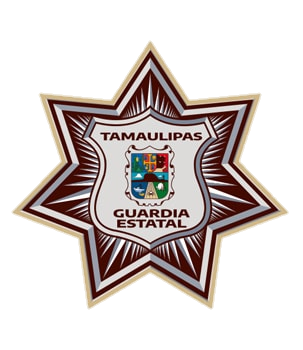
- The badge seen on Tamaulipas State Guard liveries.
- Common name: Tamaulipas Force
- Abbreviation: SSPT

Agency overview
- Formed: October 1, 2022 (Current State)
- Preceding agencies: • Tamaulipas State Police; • Tamaulipas Force
- Employees: ~5,000
- Legal personality: Governmental: Government agency

Jurisdictional structure
- Operations jurisdiction: Tamaulipas, Mexico
- Location of the state of Tamaulipas in Mexico
- Area: 80,249km2
- Population: 3,527,735 (2020)
- Legal jurisdiction: Tamaulipas
- General nature: Local civilian police

Operational structure
- Headquarters: Ciudad Victoria, Tamaulipas
- Parent agency: Secretaría Seguridad Pública de Tamaulipas
- Child agency: Fuerza Especial de Guardia Estatal

Website
- Official Site(In spanish)

The Tamaulipas State Guard (Spanish: Guardia Estatal de Tamaulipas), previously known as the Tamaulipas Force (Spanish: Fuerza Tamaulipas), is a state agency of law enforcement in Tamaulipas, Mexico. It operates public safety services. It is a division of the Secretariat of Public Safety of Tamaulipas (Spanish: Secretaría de Seguridad Pública de Tamaulipas).

== Police academy ==
The state police academy is located in Colonia Benito Juárez in Ciudad Victoria.

== Prisons ==
The agency operates the state of Tamaulipas's prisons for adults. Each is called a "Centro de Rehabilitacion Social" (CERESO, "Social Rehabilitation Center"). As of 2010 the state has eight prisons with almost 8,000 prisoners. 25% of the prisoners faced federal charges.

The prisons include:

- CERESO Altamira
- CERESO Mante
- CERESO Matamoros II - 15 miles (24 km) southwest of Matamoros
- CERESO Miguel Alemán
- CERESO Nuevo Laredo II
- CERESO Reynosa
- CERESO Tula
- CERESO Victoria

== Equipment ==
Rifles

- M4 carbine
- IWI Galil ACE
- Barrett M82
- Beretta ARX160
- FN FAL

Shotguns

- Mossberg 500

Sidearms

- Beretta 92x

Patrol Vehicles

- Dodge Charger
- Dodge Durango
- Dodge Ram
- Chevrolet Silverado
- Ford F-150
- Ford Mustang
- Ford Explorer

Armored Vehicles

- Oshkosh SandCat
- Black Mamba
