= José Manuel Garza Rendón =

Mexican drug lord

- Born: José Manuel Garza Rendón; 7 December 1952 (age 73); Matamoros, Tamaulipas, Mexico
- Other names: La Brocha; Juan Manuel Garza Rendón
- Occupation: Drug lord
- Employer(s): Federal Judicial Police (1985 - 1989), Gulf Cartel
- Criminal charges: Drug trafficking; Organized crime involvement; Illegal possession of firearms; Attempted homicide
- Criminal status: Convicted
- Spouse: Ludivina Benavides Fuentes

José Manuel Garza Rendón (born 7 December 1952), also known as La Brocha ("The Brush"), is a Mexican convicted drug lord and former high-ranking member of the Gulf Cartel, a criminal group based in Tamaulipas, Mexico. In 1979, he was convicted of drug-related charges in the U.S. Back in Mexico in 1985, Garza Rendón joined the Federal Judicial Police; released in 1989, he joined the Gulf Cartel. His roles in the cartel were managing drug shipments from the U.S. to Mexico and serving as bodyguard to former kingpin Osiel Cárdenas Guillén.

In 1999, Garza Rendón and his associates threatened two U.S. agents at gunpoint in Matamoros after the agents traveled there with an informant to gather information on the cartel's operations. Although the agents and informant returned to the U.S. unharmed, the incident triggered a manhunt for him and other cartel leaders. Garza Rendón surrendered to U.S. authorities in Texas in 2001 and was convicted of drug trafficking. In the U.S., he became an informant about the cartel's operations. Released and deported to Mexico in 2009, Garza Rendón was re-arrested and imprisoned for additional charges.

== Early life and career ==
Garza Rendón, also known as "La Brocha" ("The Brush"), was born in Matamoros, Tamaulipas, Mexico, on 7 December 1952. He dropped out of school after sixth grade. In 1979, Garza Rendón was convicted of drug-related charges in the United States. He eventually returned to Mexico and joined the now-defunct Federal Judicial Police (PJF) agency in 1985. For his first assignment as an agent, he was transferred to the state of Sonora, where he worked under former agent Rodolfo Larrazolo Rubio, the brother of former PJF commander José Luis Larrazolo Rubio. The brothers reportedly collaborated with organized crime members while they worked for the PJF, and authorities suspect that Garza Rendón gained their support. In the PJF, he was known as a firearms enthusiast. Authorities suspected that Garza Rendón began collaborating with the Gulf Cartel during the late 1980s. (Note: This calculation is based on Garza Rendón's confession in 2001, when he surrendered to U.S. officials and gave them an account of his 13 years in the Gulf Cartel.)

In 1989, Garza Rendón returned to Tamaulipas and was released from the PJF; at that time, former Gulf Cartel kingpin Juan García Ábrego was heading the syndicate. When García Ábrego was arrested in 1996, the cartel experienced internal strife as several of its factions (and leaders) vied for control. Control of the Gulf Cartel eventually consolidated under Osiel Cárdenas Guillén in 1998, and Garza Rendón became one of his bodyguards. Garza Rendón also worked closely with Gulf Cartel enforcer Gilberto García Mena ("El June"), providing support to Cárdenas.

According to his Federal Bureau of Investigation (FBI) profile, he weighed 200 lb (91 kg) and had black hair and brown eyes. Garza Rendón's height was unknown, and he had no known identifying scars or marks. He was described as Hispanic, with medium complexion, and "armed and dangerous".

=== Manhunt and charges ===
On 9 November 1999, Garza Rendón and several of his associates (including Cárdenas) threatened two U.S. agents at gunpoint in Matamoros. The agents traveled there with an informant to gather intelligence on the operations of the Gulf Cartel, and were intercepted by the cartel. Although Cárdenas threatened to kill the U.S. agents and the informant during the standoff, after a heated discussion, they were allowed to return to the U.S. unharmed. The incident led to increased law-enforcement efforts against the Gulf Cartel leadership. (Note: The cartel had threatened months before to kill Abraham Rodríguez. He was undercover Cameron County Sheriff's Office investigator working with the U.S. Customs Service in Brownsville. Garza was suspected of assaulting Rodríguez. His guilty plea later that year, however, indicated that the assault charge named only Cárdenas.) Garza Rendón's wife, Ludivina Benavides Fuentes, told investigators that he had not lived in Matamoros since 1999, but eyewitnesses reported that he frequented nightclubs there. (Note: Garza frequented El Chaparral, Jerrys, Eclipse, Barrio Antiguo, and El Gato Negro nightclubs.) Police reported that he did not have family members in Matamoros, and suspected that some of his relatives may have lived in McAllen, Texas.

In the U.S., the District Court for the Southern District of Texas (S.D. Tex.) in Brownsville filed a sealed indictment against Garza Rendón on 14 March 2000 for marijuana trafficking and for assaulting the two agents. (Note: Charges were also filed to Garza Rendón's associates, including: Cárdenas; Adán Medrano Rodríguez ("El Licenciado"); Juan Carlos de La Cruz Reyna; Jorge Eduardo Costilla Sánchez ("El Coss"); Víctor Manuel Vázquez Mireles ("El Meme"); Baldomero González Ruiz; and Rogelio García García ("El Roger").) The drug counts stated that Garza Rendón was involved in conspiracy and possession of 988 kg (2,178 lb) and 100 kg (220 lb) marijuana loads with intent to distribute. Each drug count carried a minimum mandatory sentence of 5 years and up to 40 years if found guilty, and a US$2 million fine and four years of supervised release. For the assault charges, Garza Rendón faced up to 10 years in prison, up to US$250,000 in fines, and 3 years of supervised release for each count. On 14 December 2000, the U.S. State Department announced a US$2 million bounty for Garza Rendón, Cárdenas, and Adán Medrano Rodríguez ("El Licenciado"), and unsealed the March indictment.

In Mexico, authorities issued an arrest warrant for Garza Rendón on 13 May 2000 for drug-trafficking, money-laundering, organized-crime involvement, and illegal possession of military-exclusive weapons charges. (Note: The charges were extended to other of Garza Rendón's associates: Cárdenas; Medrano; Costilla Sánchez; Vázquez Mireles; and García García.) With these charges, the Mexican government was increasing its efforts to crack down on the Gulf Cartel. Other cartel leaders were arrested during the early 2000s, sending Garza Rendón into hiding. A blow was dealt to the cartel on 30 May 2000, when García García disappeared and was later confirmed dead. García Mena was arrested on 10 April 2001. Fearing capture, Garza Rendón changed his name to José Garza Rodríguez.

Between 2 and 6 June 2001, the Specialized Unit Against Organized Crime (UEDO – a former branch of the PGR, the Attorney General's Office) cracked down on the cartel in Ciudad Miguel Alemán, Ciudad Mier, Camargo, and Reynosa. It was supported by the PJF and the Mexican Army. The UEDO had intelligence confirming the whereabouts of Garza Rendón, Medrano, and Cárdenas. However, Garza Rendón and his associates escaped capture when security forces experienced delays in gaining approval for search warrants and finalizing details of the raids. The raids were headed by PGR chief José Luis Santiago Vasconcelos, and the PGR said that security forces were closing in on cartel leaders and the arrest of Cárdenas and his associates was imminent.

== Surrender ==
On 5 June 2001, Garza Rendón surrendered to U.S. federal agents at the Pharr–Reynosa International Bridge. U.S. officials said that they were surprised to learn that Garza Rendón had decided to surrender. They speculated that he feared for his life because he was under pressure from members of the cartel, who wanted him dead for mishandling the drug business while he was addicted to cocaine. Garza Rendón was also being closely tracked by the Mexican government. According to Mexican authorities, he reached out to the U.S. government and asked to become part of the United States Federal Witness Protection Program in exchange for his surrender. An FBI spokesperson based in McAllen said that Garza Rendón telephoned U.S. authorities from Mexico and told them he was going to surrender the following day. Several U.S. agencies coordinated to avoid any issues springing from his arrest, which was made in coordination with the FBI, the Drug Enforcement Administration (DEA), the U.S. Customs, and the Immigration and Naturalization Service. Garza Rendón was held without bail, and was transferred to a prison in Cameron County, Texas.

During an S.D. Tex. hearing on 14 June 2001, Garza Rendón pled not guilty to the drug-trafficking and assault charges and said that he had no connection to Cárdenas or other members of the cartel. He said that he had a legitimate job in Mexico and was not involved in drug trafficking. Garza Rendón's court-appointed attorney said that he could not afford a private lawyer, which indicated that he was not the cartel leader alleged by the plaintiff. His attorney noted that he turned himself in, saying that if he was involved with the cartel, he would not have done that. The prosecutor limited their comments to the indictment charging Garza Rendón with drug trafficking and assault. The defense was asked to provide evidence for their client, and Garza Rendón was held without bail for the remainder of the hearings. During the hearings, U.S. authorities learned they had misidentified him when he was first charged; he was identified as Juan Manuel Garza Rendón in 2000, and his first name was later corrected. Judge John William Black confirmed that a new hearing would be held in the same court on 2 August. If convicted of the two drug charges, Garza Rendón faced up to 40 years in prison and a US$2 million fine. He faced up to 10 years in prison and a US$250,000 fine for each of the two assault charges.

== Imprisonment and deportation ==
On 6 December 2001, Garza Rendón was convicted by S.D. Tex judge Hilda G. Tagle for conspiracy to import 100 kg (220 lb) of marijuana to the U.S. from Mexico with intent to distribute. He was sentenced to nine years (108 months) in prison. His other pending 988 kg (2,178 lb) marijuana count and two assault charges were dropped on a government motion. His fines were waived, and authorities evaluated whether he needed drug treatment while serving his sentence. Garza Rendón was also prohibited from lawfully re-entering the U.S. upon his release. He served his sentence at the Reeves County Detention Complex in Pecos, Texas.

According to court records, Garza Rendón struck a deal with U.S. authorities and pleaded guilty to the drug-trafficking charges. The drug charge stemmed from the failed delivery of nearly a ton of marijuana in Houston, Texas, which Garza Rendón helped to coordinate. It was not officially known if Garza Rendón collaborated with prosecutors by testifying against other cartel members or by giving them inside information about the syndicate, but one unnamed U.S. federal agent said that the information he provided was "substantial" for their investigations of the cartel. His boss, Cárdenas, was extradited to the U.S. in 2007 and faced trial on multiple charges in Houston; it is unknown if Garza Rendón gave investigators useful information about him.

After serving most of his sentence, he was released from prison on 7 April 2009; it was unknown at the time if Garza Rendón was permitted to stay in the U.S. or if the U.S. government was planning to deport him to Mexico. A former DEA agent said that he would probably have to live the rest of his life in hiding to avoid being killed by members of the cartel for informing on them. "Basically, he is going from a safe, secure environment to being a hunted rabbit," the investigator said. A former U.S. official said that Garza Rendón also faced danger in a Mexican prison. Organized crime groups in Mexico have killed informants and rival gangsters while the victims were incarcerated. "They can reach out to him in a Mexican prison almost as easily as they can reach out to him on a Mexican street," the agent said. It was confirmed later on 7 April that Garza Rendón was handed over to U.S. Immigration and Customs Enforcement (ICE) for a deportation hearing. He was kept at the El Paso Processing Center, an immigration detention facility in El Paso, Texas, managed by ICE. On 10 April 2009, Garza Rendón was brought to the Stanton Street Bridge in El Paso and deported to Ciudad Juárez, Mexico.

In Ciudad Juárez, Federal Police and PGR officials arrested him for his Mexican charges. In a press release, the PGR said that it would continue to cooperate with international law-enforcement agencies to bring Mexican nationals like Garza Rendón to justice. His charges dated to 2000, (Note: Another source said that the charges against Garza dated to 2002.) and included organized-crime involvement, attempted homicide, drug trafficking, and possession of military-grade firearms. Although Garza Rendón said nothing to U.S. officials during his deportation, he was dismayed to see Mexican officials waiting to arrest him; it was unclear if he thought he would be free in Mexico after his deportation or if he knew that Mexican authorities were waiting to re-arrest him. He was imprisoned at Reclusorio Norte, a Mexico City penitentiary, and federal judge Olga Sánchez Contreras began legal proceedings on 4 May 2009 for the Mexican charges.

== See also ==
- Mexican drug war

== Bibliography ==
- Gutiérrez, Alejandro (2007). Narcotráfico: el gran desafío de Calderón (in Spanish). Planeta Group. ISBN 978-9703703180.
- Ravelo, Ricardo (2012). Narcomex (in Spanish). Knopf Doubleday Publishing Group. ISBN 978-0307832634.
