= Víctor Manuel Vázquez Mireles =

Mexican drug lord

- Born: Víctor Manuel Vázquez Mireles; 3 June 1967 (age 58); Tamaulipas, Mexico
- Other names: El Meme; El Meme Loco
- Employer: Gulf Cartel (suspected)
- Criminal status: Fugitive

Notes
- Wanted by the U.S. District Court for the Southern District of Texas for drug trafficking and assault

Víctor Manuel Vázquez Mireles (born 3 June 1967) is a Mexican drug lord and high-ranking member of the Gulf Cartel, a criminal group based in Tamaulipas, Mexico. Vázquez Mireles joined the cartel during the 1990s and was a trusted enforcer of former kingpin Osiel Cárdenas Guillén. He started his career in the cartel as one of his bodyguards and was eventually placed in charge of operations in Tamaulipas and Veracruz. He was reportedly responsible for supervising the purchase of drugs intended to be smuggled into the U.S. for distribution and for arranging the assistance of corrupt law enforcement officials in the cartel's operations.

In 1999, Vázquez Mireles and his associates threatened two U.S. agents at gunpoint in Matamoros after the agents traveled there with an informant to gather intelligence on the Gulf Cartel's operations. The agents and informant returned to the U.S. unharmed but this incident triggered a massive manhunt against Vázquez Mireles. He was arrested in March 2003 in Veracruz and sentenced to 7.5 years in November 2006. His conviction was later overturned and Vázquez Mireles remained without a sentence for nearly a decade. In March 2020, he was reported to have been released from custody and active in the cartel. He is a wanted fugitive in the U.S. for drug trafficking and assault.

== Early life ==
Víctor Manuel Vázquez Mireles was born on 3 June 1967 in Tamaulipas, Mexico; his birth certificate was registered in Matamoros the same year. (Note: The information on his birth certificate can be retrieved in the cited source by using his Unique Population Registry Code (CURP), VAMV670603HTSZRC06.)

== Criminal background ==
In the 1990s, Vázquez Mireles was a member of the Gulf Cartel, a criminal group based in Tamaulipas. He held a leadership role in the cartel and was a close associate of the former kingpin Osiel Cárdenas Guillén. In the late 1990s, Vázquez Mireles met with Cárdenas Guillén and his henchman Arturo Guzmán Decena to plot the murder of high-ranking Gulf Cartel leader Ángel Salvador Gómez Herrera (alias "El Chava"). Both Gómez Herrera and Cárdenas Guillén were the two visible heads of the Gulf Cartel, but Cárdenas Guillén wanted El Chava dead. Gómez Herrera was invited to a meeting with the three in Matamoros, where he was killed. Vázquez Mireles was tasked with eliminating the remaining gangsters who reported to Gómez Herrera in Matamoros, and notifying the police of the location of his corpse. After Gómez Herrera was killed, Cárdenas Guillén became the top leader of the Gulf Cartel and Vázquez Mireles remained as one of his bodyguards.

== Arrest and escape ==
On 2 January 1999, the Federal Highway Police (PFC) (es) arrested Vázquez Mireles with a 900 kg (2,000 lb) marijuana shipment at a park in Río Bravo, Tamaulipas. The marijuana was intended to be exported into the U.S. for further distribution. In Vázquez Mireles' court hearing, one police officer stated they arrested Vázquez Mireles alone while another officer contradicted this statement and said they arrested him with two other men. Considering the inconsistent testimonies and the alleged death threats the officers were receiving from the Gulf Cartel, the PFC was removed from Reynosa. (Note: On 21 March 1999, police commander Jaime Rajid Gutiérrez Arreola was murdered at the park where Vázquez Mireles was arrested. The Gulf Cartel was suspected of conducting the killing.) Vázquez Mireles was imprisoned at the Penal de Reynosa, a low-security prison in Reynosa, where he only stayed for less than a month.

On 29 January 1999, while being transported from prison to court in Reynosa for a hearing, Vázquez Mireles was freed by gunmen of the Gulf Cartel. According to police reports, around fifteen gunmen intercepted the vehicle in which he was being transported and threatened the three policemen at gunpoint. The vehicle was forced to a stop and the gunmen took Vázquez Mireles in a separate vehicle and fled the area. The operation occurred at around 11:00 a.m. and approximately between 400 m (1,300 ft) and 700 m (2,300 ft) from the prison. (Note: Another source stated that the distance was 400 m (1,300 ft).) The assailants were reportedly traveling in a marked vehicle from the Attorney General's Office (PGR) and were wearing PGR uniforms. (Note: Another source stated they had uniforms with the logos of the Federal Judicial Police.)

The prison's director blamed the three policemen for not taking the necessary logistical precautions and the judge who presided over Vázquez Mireles' case for not conducting the hearings inside the prison. The Tamaulipas State Police stated they interrogated Vázquez Mireles' lawyer because he knew of his court appearance schedule. The police also stated that the three officers who were assaulted by Vázquez Mireles' rescuers were suspects in the investigation. (Note: The policemen were Porfirio Lozano Martínez, Alonso Lira, and Rubén Vega Castro.) In response to his escape, a district court in Reynosa issued an arrest warrant against him on 1 February 1999.

== Career and manhunt ==
Federal authorities regarded Vázquez Mireles as the third-in-command within the Gulf Cartel. They suspected him of coordinating the purchase of narcotics intended to be smuggled into the U.S. through the Matamoros corridor. They also believed he managed the cartel's arrangements with corrupt officials who facilitated its operations in Matamoros. Under Cárdenas Guillén, Vázquez Mireles and Jorge Eduardo Costilla Sánchez (alias "El Coss") headed two Gulf Cartel factions known as Sierras and Tangos. These groups provided armed protection to Vázquez Mireles and conducted a range of criminal activities for the Gulf Cartel. Its members used aliases and codes to ensure their anonymity. Vázquez Mireles used several aliases throughout his career, including El Meme, El Loco, Meme Loco, El Negro, and Cabezón.

On 9 November 1999, Vázquez Mireles and several of his associates, including Cárdenas Guillén, threatened two U.S. agents at gunpoint in Matamoros. The agents traveled there with an informant to gather intelligence on the operations of the Gulf Cartel but were intercepted by the criminal group. During the standoff, Cárdenas Guillén threatened to kill the U.S. agents and the informant but after a heated conversation they were allowed to return to the U.S. unharmed. This incident led to increased law enforcement efforts against Vázquez Mireles and other Gulf Cartel leaders. The informant who was with the U.S. agents was Juan Raúl Bermúdez Núñez, a journalist from a local newspaper in Matamoros. According to the journalist, Vázquez Mireles had met with the newspaper's management to discuss monthly bribes of US$500 in exchange for not publishing stories about the Gulf Cartel. He also stated that Cárdenas Guillén and his lawyer Galo Gaspar Pérez Canales accompanied Vázquez Mireles at these meetings.

After the standoff, Mexican security forces intensified their efforts to apprehend leaders of the Gulf Cartel. On 27 March 2002, high-ranking Gulf Cartel leader Adán Medrano Rodríguez (alias "El Licenciado") was arrested in Matamoros. Vázquez Mireles was cited by security forces as one of his potential replacements. Security forces increased their surveillance in Tamaulipas to apprehend more Gulf Cartel enforcers.

On 13 May 2002, Nuevo Laredo gangster Dionisio Román García Sánchez ("El Chacho") was kidnapped by a commando of approximately twenty Zetas members in Monterrey. The operation was headed by Vázquez Mireles. Police chief Arturo Pedroza Aguirre reportedly tipped off García Sánchez's whereabouts to Cárdenas Guillén and Los Zetas; he told them that García Sánchez was hiding in a residential neighborhood, and gave them the exact home address. Los Zetas acted on his information and abducted García Sánchez at his home along with four of his henchmen; one of his gunmen, Juvenal Sánchez Torres ("El Juve"), was killed during the operation. Los Zetas suffered one casualty after their gunman Raúl Alberto Trejo Benavides ("El Alvin") was mortally wounded. García Sánchez was taken to Tamaulipas and was found dead that same day in Río Bravo; he was tortured and mutilated by his captors.

On 18 December 2002, four anti-drug investigators disappeared near Miguel Alemán, reportedly in an operation conducted by members of the Gulf Cartel. Investigators suspected Vázquez Mireles may have been involved in their disappearance. According to the PGR, Vázquez Mireles was regional leader of the Gulf Cartel in Miguel Alemán and held a higher executive position than Zeferino Peña Cuéllar. He later transferred to Veracruz to assume the cartel's operations in that region. While in charge of Miguel Alemán, he also operated in Matamoros.

A few months after the disappearance case, on 3 March 2003, Mexican security forces dealt a huge blow against the Gulf Cartel by arresting Cárdenas Guillén in Matamoros. Authorities suspected Vázquez Mireles was one of his potential successors; the other potential successors identified were Costilla Sánchez and Gregorio Sauceda Gamboa (alias "El Caramuela"). A few weeks later, before he could potentially take power, Vázquez Mireles was arrested.

=== Indictments and sanctions ===
Vázquez Mireles faced a variety of indictments in the U.S. and Mexico. On 1 February 1999, a court in Reynosa issued a re-apprehension warrant against Vázquez Mireles after he was rescued by suspected members of the Gulf Cartel. On 18 May 2002, a penal court in Mexico City issued an arrest warrant against Vázquez Mireles for his suspected involvement in organized crime, drug trafficking, conspiracy to murder, and for being in possession of military-exclusive firearms. In addition, on 10 June 2002, a penal court in the State of Mexico issued another arrest warrant against him for organized crime involvement and money laundering charges. In the U.S., the District Court for the Southern District of Texas in Brownsville filed a sealed indictment against Vázquez Mireles and other Gulf Cartel members on 14 March 2000. They were charged with two drug trafficking offenses and two counts of assault against U.S. law enforcement officers. The U.S. government issued an extradition request to the Mexican government for the charges against Vázquez Mireles there. The March indictment was unsealed on 14 December 2000. This indictment, however, was superseded on 9 April 2002 when Vázquez Mireles, along with other senior Gulf Cartel members, was charged by a court in Houston. In the new indictment, Vázquez Mireles was charged with multiple illegal marijuana and cocaine importations.

On 24 March 2010, the Office of Foreign Assets Control (OFAC), a branch of the United States Department of the Treasury, sanctioned 54 high-ranking members of the Gulf Cartel and Los Zetas, including Vázquez Mireles, under the Foreign Narcotics Kingpin Designation Act (Kingpin Act). This sanction was made after U.S. and Mexican officials met in Mexico City the day before as part of the Mérida Initiative. It also included the support of the U.S. Drug Enforcement Administration (DEA) and their special operations team, which assisted the OFAC in identifying the designated suspects. The list of designated suspects included drug traffickers, money launders, hitmen, and enforcers. Several of them controlled drug trafficking operations in Tamaulipas, Nuevo León, and other parts of Mexico, and had previous drug charges in the U.S.

Though Vázquez Mireles was already imprisoned in Mexico at the time of the sanction, he faced drug-related charges in the U.S. and was considered a fugitive. As part of the sanction, the U.S. government prohibited U.S. citizens from engaging in business activities with Vázquez Mireles and froze all of his U.S.-based assets. This was done to reduce his financial support to the Gulf Cartel and Los Zetas, and prevent him from having access to the international financial sector. Vázquez Mireles faced up to US$5 million in fines and up to 30 years in prison for such violations. In the release, the OFAC publicly named several of Vázquez Mireles' addresses in Nuevo León and Tamaulipas. In Nuevo León, the OFAC listed addresses in Guadalupe and San Nicolás de los Garza; in Tamaulipas, they listed in Matamoros and Tampico. (Note: Though not mentioned in the OFAC listing, he also had a home in Brownsville, Texas, U.S.)

== Re-arrest and aftermath ==
On 28 March 2003, police officers assigned to the Veracruz–Boca del Río intermunicipal force arrested Vázquez Mireles and several other suspects after they were seen drinking alcohol in public in Veracruz's boardwalk area while inside four vehicles—two Grand Marquis and two Ford Lobo pickups. The police conducted a routine check inside their vehicles and discovered they were in possession of multiple firearms, and proceeded to arrest them. (Note: They were in possession of two .38 Super handguns and two cartridges.) Among the detainees was Francisco Mota Uribe (alias "Chito"), the former mayor of Colipa. (Note: Three years earlier, Mexican authorities suspected that Mota Uribe was involved with drug trafficking groups and cargo theft rings. Mota Uribe disappeared on 19 April 2010 along with Mexican journalist Evaristo Ortega Zárate.) Vázquez Mireles identified himself to the policemen using an alias, Adolfo Elizalde Silva. He lied about his background and stated he was a 35-year-old cattle rancher who lived in Veracruz. Once detained, Vázquez Mireles was handed over to federal authorities for being in possession of military-exclusive firearms. The Specialized Unit Against Organized Crime (UEDO) and the Mexican Army confirmed his real identity hours later and stated that he had three arrest warrants from courts in Reynosa, Mexico City, and the State of Mexico for drug trafficking, money laundering, and organized crime involvement charges.

According to police reports, Vázquez Mireles tried to bribe Carlos Martín Espinoza Benítez, the lead officer who was conducting the arrest, to let him go. The officer stated that Vázquez Mireles offered him money and multiple properties but that he told him drinking in public was a violation of the law and he could not let him go. Espinoza Benítez said he did not know of Vázquez Mireles's involvement with the Gulf Cartel or of the weapons in the suspects' vehicles until he searched their belongings. The Governor of Veracruz Miguel Alemán Velasco gave Espinoza Benítez the Police Officer of the Year Award for his actions. (Note: In July 2017, Espinoza Benítez was released from his post as director of Veracruz's Secretariat of Public Security (SSP) for his alleged ties to organized crime groups in Poza Rica.) Espinoza Benítez stated a year after the incident that he received many death threats over the telephone from Vázquez Mireles's family members, friends, and cohorts from the Gulf Cartel. He said the people who called were angry about the arrest and told him they would seek revenge, but Espinoza Benítez told them Vázquez Mireles was never humiliated or ill-treated during his apprehension.

== Imprisonment ==
On 30 March 2003, Vázquez Mireles and the rest of the detainees were transferred to Federal Social Readaptation Center No. 1 (formerly known as "La Palma"), a maximum security prison in Almoloya de Juárez, State of Mexico. PGR anti-drug chief José Luis Santiago Vasconcelos confirmed that Vázquez Mireles was charged with money laundering, drug trafficking, conspiracy to murder, organized crime involvement, and illegal possession of military-exclusive firearms. On 6 April 2003, a State of Mexico judge charged him with organized crime involvement, drug trafficking, and money laundering, and officially started the trial against him. His defense filed a motion for his release by questioning the evidence presented by the prosecution. On 24 July 2003, a State of Mexico penal court confirmed the judge's decision and his previous charges.

While imprisoned at La Palma, officials discovered on 2 February 2005 that prison guards were smuggling cellphones to give to Vázquez Mireles and other members of the Gulf Cartel, including his boss Cárdenas Guillén. The cellphones were reportedly used to make calls to the exterior and to help Vázquez Mireles continue running the Gulf Cartel's operations from prison. The instability and corruption in La Palma forced the Secretariat of Public Security (SSP) to move several inmates to two other maximum-security prisons in Mexico on 18 May 2005. (Note: This specific measure was implemented after Guatemalan drug lord Otto Roberto Herrera García escaped from prison on 13 May 2005. Other transfers were conducted since mid-2005 when former SSP head Ramón Martín Huerta took office.) Authorities suspected Cárdenas Guillén, along with former Tijuana Cartel drug lord Benjamín Arellano Félix, was planning a massive prison break.

Prison authorities decided to transfer Vázquez Mireles to Federal Social Readaptation Center No. 3 (also known as "Santa Adelaida"), a maximum-security prison near Matamoros. This was done despite former SSP head Ramón Martín Huerta stating that none of the Gulf Cartel members imprisoned at La Palma would be sent to Santa Adelaida, a Gulf Cartel stronghold. The other option was Federal Social Readaptation Center No. 2 (also known as "Puente Grande"), a maximum-security prison in Jalisco. Vázquez Mireles was eventually transferred to Puente Grande; he filed a writ of amparo in a court in Jalisco after prison authorities passed a new regulation restricting the number of family or conjugal visitors and telephone calls the inmates could receive. The request issued by Vázquez Mireles' defense was rejected in March 2014.

== Trial and release ==
On 13 November 2006, a federal judge based in Reynosa sentenced Vázquez Mireles to 7.5 years in prison. (Note: Not to be confused with Víctor Manuel Mireles Vázquez, an alleged family member of Vázquez Mireles. He was arrested in 2004 and was sentenced to 20 years in May 2007. He was an enforcer of Los Kelines, a group commanded by Rogelio González Pizaña.) He was also fined MXN$5,580 (approximately US$510.5 in November 2006), equivalent to 162 days of minimum wage. According to the PGR, the judge found him guilty of marijuana possession; the conviction stated he was guilty of being in possession of 98 marijuana packages weighing 503.3 kg (1,110 lb). The PGR also stated he was guilty of leading the Gulf Cartel in Tamaulipas and Veracruz, and of buying narcotics for distribution in the U.S. through Matamoros with the assistance of corrupt law enforcement personnel. Vázquez Mireles' political and civil rights were suspended for the duration of his sentence. His sentence was later annulled but Vázquez Mireles remained imprisoned and was issued with other charges.

On 5 February 2009, a federal court in Jalisco issued a conspiracy to murder charge against Vázquez Mireles. (Note: Another source stated that this charge was issued on 14 July 2011.) This new charge was brought as part of an investigation headed by the Subprocuraduría de Investigación Especializada en Delincuencia Organizada (SIEDO), Mexico's organized crime investigation agency. Vázquez Mireles was not the only criminal charged in this SIEDO investigation; new charges were also issued against seventeen other suspected criminals imprisoned in Mexico. Vázquez Mireles' defense issued a writ of amparo against this charge, stating that their client was issued the charge and had not been handed a sentence for several years. They asked a court to revert the charge and allow Vázquez Mireles to be conditionally released. On 27 June 2012, however, the National Supreme Court of Justice rejected the motion and stated that they were keeping Vázquez Mireles in jail because conspiracy to murder is considered a serious crime.

On 11 September 2012, Vázquez Mireles filed a complaint to a federal court in Mexico City after being imprisoned since 2003 without receiving a sentence. He claimed this was a violation of his human rights and asked the court to allow him to be tried under conditional release. He cited violations stipulated in the International Covenant on Civil and Political Rights, which grants the right to a speedy trial within a reasonable time or a release if this right is not guaranteed. Judges Horacio Hernández Orozco, Humberto Venancio Pineda, and Guadalupe Mejía Sánchez presided over the case and requested a tribunal to decide on Vázquez Mireles' motion.

After the motion, penal court judge Olga Sánchez Contreras sentenced Vázquez Mireles to 12 years in prison for organized crime involvement based on the death threats he made to the two U.S. agents in Matamoros in 1999, but a tribunal in Mexico City canceled the sentence on 17 March 2013. The tribunal determined that the evidence presented by the PGR was deficient and asked the prosecution to re-examine the evidence and gather more. On 17 May 2019, the government confirmed that Vázquez Mireles was handed an 8-year sentence for organized crime involvement. On 3 March 2020, it was reported that Vázquez Mireles was released from prison and rejoined his organized crime activities by working with Mario Alberto Cárdenas Medina ("El Betillo").

== See also ==
- Mexican drug war

== Bibliography ==
- Gómez, María Idalia; Fritz, Darío (2005). Con la muerte en el bolsillo: seis desaforadas historias del narcotráfico en México (in Spanish). Planeta Group. ISBN 978-9703700271.
- Grayson, George W.; Logan, Samuel (2015). The Executioner's Men: Los Zetas, Rogue Soldiers, Criminal Entrepreneurs, and the Shadow State They Created. Transaction Publishers. ISBN 978-1412855310.
- Deibert, Michael (2014). In the Shadow of Saint Death: The Gulf Cartel and the Price of America's Drug War in Mexico. Rowman & Littlefield. ISBN 978-1493010653.
- Ravelo, Ricardo (2012). Osiel: Vida y tragedia de un capo (in Spanish). Penguin Random House. ISBN 978-6073107716.
- Grayson, George W. (2011). Mexico: Narco-Violence and a Failed State?. Transaction Publishers. ISBN 978-1412815512.
- Marley, David (2019). Mexican cartels: an encyclopedia of Mexico's crime and drug wars. ABC-CLIO. ISBN 9781440864766. OCLC 1096213037.
