= 1999 Matamoros standoff =

Standoff in Matamoros, Mexico

- State of Tamaulipas in Mexico
- Date: 9 November 1999; 2:30 p.m. (approximately)
- Location: Matamoros, Tamaulipas, Mexico
- Caused by: Spying on Gulf Cartel properties
- Goals: Capture of Gulf Cartel informant; Intimidate the two U.S. agents
- Methods: Armed standoff
- Result: U.S. agents and informant allowed to return to Brownsville, Texas, U.S.; Major law enforcement efforts against the Gulf Cartel and its leaders

Parties
Drug Enforcement Administration (DEA); Federal Bureau of Investigation (FBI); Policia Federal Preventiva	Gulf Cartel; Matamoros Municipal Police (suspected); Tamaulipas State Police (suspected)

Lead figures
Joe DuBois (DEA); Daniel Fuentes (FBI)	Osiel Cárdenas Guillén

Number
3	≈15

Casualties and losses
0	0

On 9 November 1999, two agents from the United States Drug Enforcement Administration (DEA) and Federal Bureau of Investigation (FBI) were threatened at gunpoint and nearly killed in Matamoros, Tamaulipas, Mexico, by gunmen of the Gulf Cartel, a criminal group based in the area. The two agents traveled to Matamoros with an informant to gather intelligence on the operations of the Gulf Cartel. As they cruised through one of the properties owned by the criminal group, they noticed several vehicles following them. The agents were forced to a stop and were corralled by a convoy of eight vehicles, from which 15 gunmen emerged and surrounded the agents' car. Some of them wore uniforms of the local police. Among the gunmen was the former kingpin Osiel Cárdenas Guillén, who recognized the informant and ordered the three of them to get out of their vehicle.

Fearing torture and interrogation, the agents agreed they would not allow the Gulf Cartel to take them alive. They decided their best chance of survival was to talk their way out of the incident. The agents repeatedly refused to comply with Cárdenas Guillén's orders and tried to reason with him that killing U.S. federal agents would result in a massive manhunt by the U.S. government. The incident escalated; profanities were exchanged and the gunmen prepared to shoot but Cárdenas Guillén ordered them to hold fire. One of the agents had a concealed handgun next to his thigh and was planning to kill Cárdenas Guillén if the gunmen opened fire. After 20 minutes, Cárdenas Guillén allowed the agents and the informant to return to Brownsville, Texas, U.S., and threatened to kill them if they ever returned.

The standoff triggered a massive law enforcement effort to crack down on the leadership structure of the Gulf Cartel. Cárdenas Guillén, who was previously regarded as a minor player in the international drug trade, became one of the most-wanted criminals in the world. The FBI and the DEA mounted numerous charges against him and issued a US$2 million bounty for his arrest. He was arrested in 2003 and extradited to the U.S. in 2007, where he was sentenced to 25 years in prison for drug trafficking, money laundering, and assaulting U.S. federal agents. He was also ordered to forfeit US$50 million, a small portion of what U.S. authorities believe he made in the Gulf Cartel. Several Gulf Cartel members involved in the standoff were also eventually arrested and convicted.

== Background ==
The Gulf Cartel, a drug cartel based in Matamoros, Tamaulipas, Mexico, was founded in the 1930s by Juan Nepomuceno Guerra. It initially smuggled alcohol and other illegal goods into the U.S. but grew significantly in the 1970s under the leadership of kingpin Juan García Ábrego. By forming alliances with Colombian drug traffickers, García Ábrego coordinated marijuana and cocaine shipments into the U.S. and helped consolidate the Gulf Cartel as a multibillion-dollar criminal enterprise. In 1996, he was arrested and extradited to the U.S., where he was sentenced to eleven life sentences. Without a clear leadership, the Gulf Cartel underwent internal strife. Osiel Cárdenas Guillén, a low-level drug dealer, rose through the ranks of the cartel as other leaders were arrested or killed in the infighting. In mid-1999, Cárdenas Guillén ordered the murder of his friend Salvador Gómez Herrera (alias "El Chava"), the last man in line in the Gulf Cartel's leadership structure. With Gómez Herrera's death, Cárdenas Guillén consolidated himself as the top leader of the Gulf Cartel. To protect himself from rival gangsters and security forces, Cárdenas Guillén formed a private army known as Los Zetas, which consisted of former military officials. Unlike García Ábrego, Cárdenas Guillén did not enjoy the same level of protection and favoritism from government networks, and consolidated his power through the use of violence.

=== Previous operations ===
In August 1996, the Drug Enforcement Administration (DEA) launched an anti-drug investigation known as Operation Limelight that initially targeted Mexico's Juárez Cartel and Amado Carrillo Fuentes. During the operation's second phase dubbed Operation Impunity I in January 1998, the DEA focused on the Juárez Cartel's drug corridors in Tamaulipas and South Texas, where the Gulf Cartel was based. The DEA suspected Cárdenas Guillén was the leading crime figure in the Matamoros corridor and was working closely with the Juárez Cartel. In 1998, the DEA opened an investigation known as Operation Cazadores with the intention of arresting him. Undercover agents met Cárdenas Guillén in person at least twice. On 9 June 1999, (Note: Another stated that the assault occurred in May 1999.) Cárdenas Guillén threatened to kill Abraham Rodríguez, an undercover Cameron County Sheriff's Office investigator working with the U.S. Customs Service in Brownsville. The undercover agent refused to deliver a 988 kg (2,178 lb) load of marijuana on behalf of the Gulf Cartel.

Logo of the Drug Enforcement Administration (DEA), which began operations against the Gulf Cartel

The Mexican and U.S. governments signed an agreement in 1998 prohibiting undercover work by U.S. officials in Mexican territory without the explicit approval and supervision of the Mexican government. Until then, most of the undercover operations in Mexico were often conducted by U.S. officials without the authorization or knowledge of the Mexican government. The agreement did not instruct U.S. officials how they should defend themselves when facing threats. One anonymous U.S. official confirmed the agents were armed during the standoff, although he stated that they never flashed or used their weapons. Other U.S. officials refused to comment on whether or not the agents were armed during the standoff. When the standoff occurred, it was illegal for the U.S. officials to conduct law enforcement operations or carry their firearms into Mexico.

In 1998, Juan Raúl Bermúdez Núñez, a journalist from El Diario de Matamoros who accompanied the two agents in Matamoros, became an informant for the DEA and the FBI. (Note: He was also referred to by his code name José Luis and Tiburcio.) He contacted the agencies and asked them to help him become a protected witness. Bermúdez Núñez had interviewed Cárdenas Guillén at his newspaper offices a few months before the standoff; in the interview, Cárdenas Guillén said he was the leader of the Gulf Cartel and threatened to kill Bermúdez Núñez. The journalist also wrote an article describing Cárdenas Guillén's ordering of the killing of Gómez Herrera. After the interview was published, Cárdenas Guillén gained the nickname "El Mata Amigos" (The Friend Killer). The Gulf Cartel had tried to bribe Bermúdez Núñez multiple times to prevent him from releasing articles about its organized crime activities. According to Bermúdez Núñez, the head representative of the newspaper, Mario Díaz, met with Cárdenas Guillén, his lawyer Galo Gaspar Pérez Canales, and Gulf Cartel member Víctor Manuel Vázquez Mireles to discuss bribery payments. They offered the newspaper US$500 a month to stop publishing about the Gulf Cartel. Bermúdez Núñez said he never accepted their money.

In October 1999, a month before the standoff, federal agents confirmed the links between the Juárez Cartel and the Gulf Cartel, and extended their law enforcement efforts to both groups under Operation Impunity II, the third phase of Operation Limelight. Most of the operation's focus was in the border cities Reynosa and Matamoros, where the Gulf Cartel had a stronghold. They confirmed that Cárdenas Guillén had united remnants of the Carrillo Fuentes' organization and those who once reported to former Gulf Cartel leader García Ábrego. Operation Cazadores continued mostly as an undercover operation against Cárdenas Guillén; it included support from the U.S. Customs Service, the Federal Bureau of Investigation (FBI), the DEA, the Cameron County Sheriff's Office, the Brownsville Police Department, the Texas Department of Public Safety, and Mexico's Attorney General's Office (PGR).

== Standoff ==
At around 2:30 p.m. on 9 November 1999, DEA and FBI agents Joe DuBois and Daniel Fuentes traveled to Matamoros to gather intelligence on the operations of the Gulf Cartel. DuBois was based in the DEA office at the Consulate General of the United States in Monterrey, Nuevo León, and Fuentes worked at the DEA offices in Houston, Texas. They picked up their informant and collaborator, Bermúdez Núñez, at a restaurant close to the Gateway International Bridge. The agents drove a white Ford Bronco bearing diplomatic plates through the streets of Matamoros. The informant gave the two agents a tour of the houses where several Gulf Cartel members lived and of the stash houses they used to keep drugs before they were transported to the U.S. They reached La Aurora neighborhood, where Cárdenas Guillén lived, and tried to take pictures of his pink-colored mansion. Within moments, they noticed a Lincoln Continental, which was followed by a second vehicle, following them. The agents called the DEA offices in Houston using their mobile telephone and asked them to investigate the Texan license plates of a cherry-red Explorer, one of the vehicles that was following them. The DEA confirmed the vehicle was stolen. The persecution continued in Matamoros' streets but the agents' car was cut off by three vehicles and forced to stop. Within moments, they were surrounded by a caravan of eight vehicles.

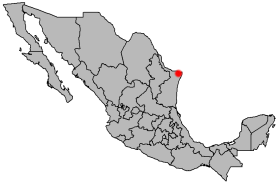
Location of Matamoros, Tamaulipas (red spot) within Mexico

According to the federal agents, up to fifteen Gulf Cartel gunmen carrying AK-47s, AR-15s, and .45-caliber pistols left their vehicles and surrounded the agents. Some of them wore police uniforms, and the agents suspected that several of the gunmen were from the Matamoros Municipal Police or the Tamaulipas State Police. The incident occurred a few blocks away from the city's police station. The Gulf Cartel blockaded the road on which the agents were corralled while other men in police uniforms helped direct traffic in another direction. The agents tried asking Tamaulipas State Police commander Gilberto García Garza through their cellphone to call for backup, but they claimed the commander took no action even though he was reportedly monitoring the incident over the telephone. (Note: According to the informant, Gilberto García Garza may have also been on the Gulf Cartel's payroll. The commander worked under police chief Pedro Hernández Quiroga, who was arrested in 2010 for providing armed protection to the Gulf Cartel.) DuBois and Fuentes recognized they were outnumbered and surrounded; they briefly discussed the situation and agreed they would not allow the Gulf Cartel to kidnap them. "[Fuentes] and I decided, if we are going to die, we are going to die here", DuBois said in an interview. Both agents made this decision after considering their options and recognizing they would likely be kidnapped, tortured, and interrogated before being killed. "I knew what they'd do to me. I'd seen many pictures of the bodies [the Gulf Cartel] leave behind", DuBois said. They decided the only viable option was to try to talk their way out of the incident.

Cárdenas Guillén stepped out of a white Jeep Cherokee and walked towards the agents' car. Cárdenas Guillén had a Colt pistol with a golden grip on his belt and was carrying a gold-plated AK-47. When he got to the car, he recognized the informant and ordered the agents to get out and hand him over. "Get off the car you sons of a bitches. I am going to kill you", Cárdenas Guillén yelled. The agents refused. Fuentes flashed his FBI badge but Cárdenas Guillén began slurring profanities at them and threatened to shoot them if they did not comply. At one point during the heated discussion, Cárdenas Guillén held his weapon to Fuentes' head. When the agents refused to concede, Cárdenas Guillén asked them to surrender the informant only, but the agents refused again. Cárdenas Guillén told the agents he did not care that they were U.S. federal agents, but DuBois told him he would regret his decision for the rest of his life if he decided to hurt them. "I told him, 'Think it over, man. There is no way that you will be able to hide anywhere. [The U.S. government will] come get you'", DuBois said. He reminded Cárdenas Guillén of the manhunt that followed after DEA agent Kiki Camarena was killed by drug traffickers in Mexico in 1985. (Note: Organized crime groups in Mexico have traditionally avoided targeting U.S. authorities since the murder of Camarena. The murder set a precedent of the possible wrath that may follow from the U.S. government for targeting their officials.) "You are fixing to make 300,000 enemies", DuBois said. The agents employed this strategy because they recognized appeals to morality would not work against Cárdenas Guillén, but appeals to self-preservation would likely persuade him to let them go. DuBois also did this to stand tough against Cárdenas Guillén and his henchmen, but also to prevent Cárdenas Guillén from having to face embarrassment in front of his men.

DuBois and Fuentes had a second option in case the gunmen attempted to kill them. Fuentes had a handgun next to his thigh and was planning to kill Cárdenas Guillén if the gunmen decided to shoot them. "Unless they got [Fuentes] in a head shot, [Cárdenas Guillén] was coming with us", DuBois said. The gunmen raised their guns in firing position but Cárdenas Guillén told them to hold fire and allowed the agents and the informant to leave. "You fucking gringos," he yelled. "This is my town, so get the fuck out here before I kill all of you. Don't ever come back", Cárdenas Guillén told them. The gunmen and Cárdenas Guillén returned to their vehicles and the agents headed back to Brownsville, Texas. The gunmen followed the agents to the border. Once in the U.S., they telephoned top government officials from both countries, who were coincidentally in a meeting in Washington D.C. that day. The following day, Cárdenas Guillén celebrated the standoff by hosting a party with his henchmen at a local taco restaurant in Matamoros.

== Manhunt ==
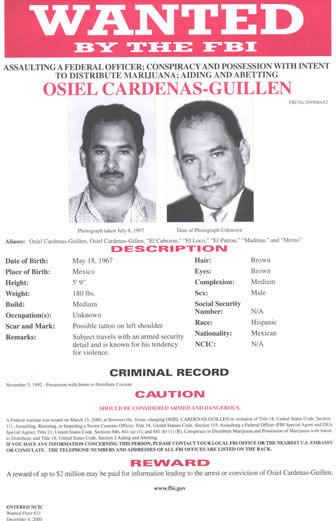
Wanted poster of Osiel Cárdenas Guillén offering a US$2 million bounty

After the standoff, the U.S. government increased its law enforcement efforts to crack down on the leadership of the Gulf Cartel and made significant efforts to apprehend Cárdenas Guillén. Prior to the incident, he was a not regarded as a key player in the organized crime scene but his involvement in the standoff increased his notability. He was eventually placed on the list of the FBI and the DEA ten most-wanted list, and was accused of international drug trafficking and assault. The DEA called the standoff one of the "most serious" incidents in Mexico since the murder of Camarena, and highlighted the vulnerabilities U.S. officials face in Mexico while on duty. They drew similarities with Camarena's murder because several policemen were also believed to have been involved in the standoff. Mexican officials stated that the involvement of the police in the standoff was not confirmed but that they were investigating the incident exhaustively. The DEA stated it was worried about the safety of its agents in Mexico and confirmed the Mexican government was working closely with it to apprehend the perpetrators. Days after the standoff, the DEA purchased several armored vehicles in the U.S. and sent them to Mexico for its agents stationed there.

The U.S. government also pressured Mexico to intensify its efforts to apprehend Cárdenas Guillén. Because the agents were nearly killed, the incident created tensions in Mexico–United States relations. Mexico's attorney general Jorge Madrazo Cuéllar and PGR anti-drug chief Mariano Herrán Salvatti met with the U.S. presidential cabinet hours later and discussed the incident. They did not recognize Cárdenas Guillén's name and asked another PGR anti-drug chief, José Luis Santiago Vasconcelos, for reports on his background. The records they retrieved stated he was a low-level criminal. President Ernesto Zedillo (1994–2000) acted on the U.S.'s request and sent the Mexican Armed Forces to Tamaulipas to apprehend Cárdenas Guillén. They carried out operations in Matamoros, Reynosa, and Nuevo Laredo. Cárdenas Guillén, however, had abandoned Tamaulipas and relocated in the state of Nuevo León with several of his henchmen. He hid in a ranch known as Las Amarrillas in China, Nuevo León. He bought the ranch from Humberto García Ábrego via his lawyer Juan Jesús Guerrero Chapa.

U.S. authorities interviewed Cárdenas Guillén's father, one of his uncles, and his brother Homero Cárdenas Guillén, who they did not suspect was involved in organized crime activities. They eventually were able to wiretap several phone conversations between Cárdenas Guillén and his wife Celia Salinas Aguilar. They concluded in these conversations that Cárdenas Guillén was hiding in Monterrey with his wife and two children: Celia Marlén and Osiel Jr. As the investigation tightened, they discovered his family travelled in a Jetta, BMW, and an X Terra, and identified the schools their kids attended. In their conversations, Cárdenas Guillén warned his wife that the phones they were using were probably wiretapped, and asked her to communicate with him through other lines. U.S. agents also researched Cárdenas Guillén's lovers and discovered that he had an affinity towards Colombian women. They interviewed a Colombian national who was dating him, Andrea Posadas Williamson. She confirmed the drug lord's whereabouts in Mexico City in September 2000.

A week after the standoff, the U.S. government gave Mexico several addresses that were linked to the Gulf Cartel. Mexican authorities carried out several raids in these properties but the information was outdated and the operations did not further the investigation. As the government increased its presence in Tamaulipas, several of Cárdenas Guillén's accomplices went for vacations in several resort areas. On 31 December 1999, Cárdenas Guillén hosted a party in Cancún with several of his henchmen. By the start of 2000, he refused to visit Matamoros under fear of being arrested. He preferred to stay in Mexico City and made only sporadic trips to Tamaulipas that year. Cárdenas Guillén stayed at multiple hotels throughout the year but eventually grew tired and bought a home in Bosques de las Lomas, Mexico City.

=== Reaction and identification of suspects ===
On 18 November 1999, DuBois and Fuentes met with a PGR head Héctor Daniel Dávalos Martínez in San Antonio, Texas, and told him what had occurred in the standoff. Dávalos Martínez showed the agents the pictures of several Gulf Cartel members the PGR had on file, and the agents recognized some of them as the perpetrators. Those involved in the standoff were Cárdenas Guillén; Baldomero González Ruiz (alias "El Viejo Fox"); Juan Carlos de la Cruz Reyna (alias "El JC"); Vázquez Mireles (alias "El Meme Loco"); Jorge Eduardo Costilla Sánchez (alias "El Coss"); José Manuel Garza Rendón (alias "La Brocha"); Adán Medrano Rodríguez (alias "El Licenciado"); Rogelio González Pizaña (alias "Z-2"); Alejandro Estévez García; Arturo Meléndez Reta; Saúl González López; Antonio Cárdenas Guillén (alias "Tony Tormenta"); Gregorio Sauceda Gamboa (alias "El Caramuelas"); and Rogelio García García (alias "El Roger").

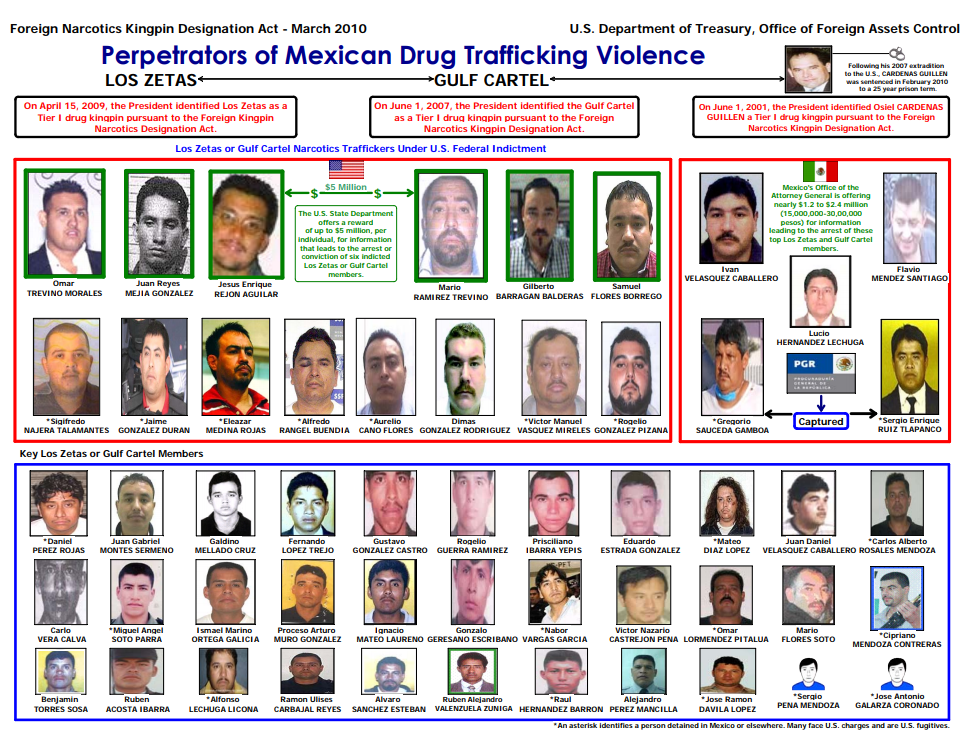
Leadership chart of the Gulf Cartel and Los Zetas issued by the U.S. Department of the Treasury

DuBois also recounted the incident to Kevin C. Whaley, former head of the DEA offices in Houston, telling him the reason they did not leave their vehicle when Cárdenas Guillén ordered them to do so. He told Whaley the agents would likely have been killed if they had done as Cárdenas Guillén asked them. He said he accepted the possibility of his death in the vehicle in front of several eyewitnesses, which DuBois said had deterred the gunmen from killing them. He also stated that their refusal to follow orders confused the gunmen because they rarely have people stand up against them.

Bermúdez Núñez also traveled to San Antonio to give his account of the incident and explain what he knew of the Gulf Cartel. He told law enforcement he had known Cárdenas Guillén since 1998, and that he knew the Gulf Cartel was supported by members of the Matamoros Municipal Police and the Tamaulipas State Police. A total of 29 policemen who were collaborating with the Gulf Cartel were mentioned by him; six were from the local police and twenty-three were from the state police force. Bermúdez Núñez also stated that Cárdenas Guillén received support from policemen stationed at General Lucio Blanco International Airport in Reynosa, and that policemen acted as his armed squad to carry out executions on the Gulf Cartel's behalf, and aided its international drug trafficking operations.

On 28 July 2000, during the 48th Annual Awards Ceremony of the U.S. Department of Justice, DuBois and Fuentes were recognized by the U.S. Attorney General Janet Reno for their "exceptional heroism". (Note: These awards are given to people who make important contributions to law enforcement efforts. The Attorney General's Awards are the highest-ranking awards offered by the department.) In the ceremony, Reno highlighted the two agents' calmness and refusal to comply with Cárdenas Guillén's demands to surrender their informant and step out of the vehicle. She stated that the agents reminded Cárdenas Guillén of the consequences of his actions and showed "professionalism and courage" despite being outnumbered and facing life-threatening circumstances.

== Aftermath ==
=== Indictments and sanctions ===
To formally build a case around Cárdenas Guillén, the U.S. government filed several indictments against him. His charges dated from 1998 to 2002, and included conspiracy to import cocaine and marijuana to the U.S. from Mexico, money laundering, and assault against U.S. law enforcement. On 14 March 2000, Cárdenas Guillén and several of his aides were indicted by a grand jury of the United States District Court for the Southern District of Texas in Brownsville; they were charged with two drug trafficking offenses and two assault counts against U.S. law enforcement officers. The first assault charge was for the June 1999 offense against the undercover agent from Cameron County. The second assault charge was for the standoff in Matamoros in November 1999. On 14 December 2000, U.S. Department of State assistant deputy Wendy Chamberlin announced a US$2 million bounty for Cárdenas Guillén, Garza Rendón, and Medrano Rodríguez. This announcement was made alongside an indictment issued in Brownsville charging Cárdenas Guillén and seven of his associates of drug trafficking and assault against federal agents. "We are sending a clear and strong message that no one can threaten or harm a federal agent with impunity," DEA chief Donnie R. Marshall said in the press release. U.S. officials stated that they believed Cárdenas Guillén was hiding in Reynosa or Matamoros.

Law enforcement pressure against the Gulf Cartel and Cárdenas Guillén was also extended to their financial networks. On 1 June 2001, Cárdenas Guillén was sanctioned under the Foreign Narcotics Kingpin Designation Act (Kingpin Act) after President Bill Clinton considered him a "significant" international drug trafficker. The sanction was also extended to 11 other suspected drug traffickers across the world, including Álvarez Tostado, Sher Afghan, Miguel Caro Quintero, Chang Ping Yun, Joseph Gilboa, Joaquín Guzmán Loera, Jamiel Hamieh, Ismael Higuera Guerrero, Nasir Ali Khan, Óscar Malherbe de León, and Alcides Ramón Magaña. As a result of the sanction, Cárdenas Guillén's U.S.-based assets were frozen and U.S. citizens and companies were prohibited from engaging in business activities with him. It also revoked the visas of his family members who benefited from his illicit funds.

In October 2001, the U.S. Customs Service placed Cárdenas Guillén on its list of top-ten most-wanted international suspects. He was the third Mexican national to be included on this list; previously, Juárez Cartel leader Juan José Álvarez Tostado and Tijuana Cartel leader David Garzón Anguiano were on the list. In the report, Cárdenas Guillén was described as an armed and dangerous criminal who could be identified by a birthmark on the right side of his face and a tattoo on his left shoulder. On 9 April 2002, Cárdenas Guillén, along with nine associates, was indicted again for cocaine trafficking and continuous criminal enterprise activities.

=== Arrests ===
At around 9:45 a.m. on 14 March 2003, Cárdenas Guillén was arrested in Matamoros by the Mexican Army after a large shootout with his gunmen. There were three different shootouts during the operation; the first one occurred inside a house in Satélite neighborhood, where Cárdenas Guillén had been hiding for several months. The shootout there lasted about half an hour, during which Cárdenas Guillén's bodyguards were outnumbered and surrounded by the Army. When the military entered the house, Cárdenas Guillén tried to escape through a backyard wall but was apprehended. As he was taken into custody, a second shootout broke out outside the house after his gunmen tried to prevent his arrest. The third shootout broke out near Matamoros International Airport when a group of gunmen tried to rescue Cárdenas Guillén and prevent the military from transporting him to Mexico City. Once in Mexico City, he was handed over to the PGR and sent to Campo Militar 1, a military installation. He was then transferred via helicopter to the Federal Social Readaptation Center No. 1 (previously known as "La Palma"), a maximum-security prison in Almoloya de Juárez, State of Mexico. Three military men were wounded in the shootouts; at least one Gulf Cartel gunmen was killed and six more were wounded. Two uninvolved civilians were also injured in the attacks. After the third shootout, the military erected checkpoints and carried out vehicle inspections on the highways connecting Matamoros with Reynosa, Ciudad Victoria, and Playa Bagdad.

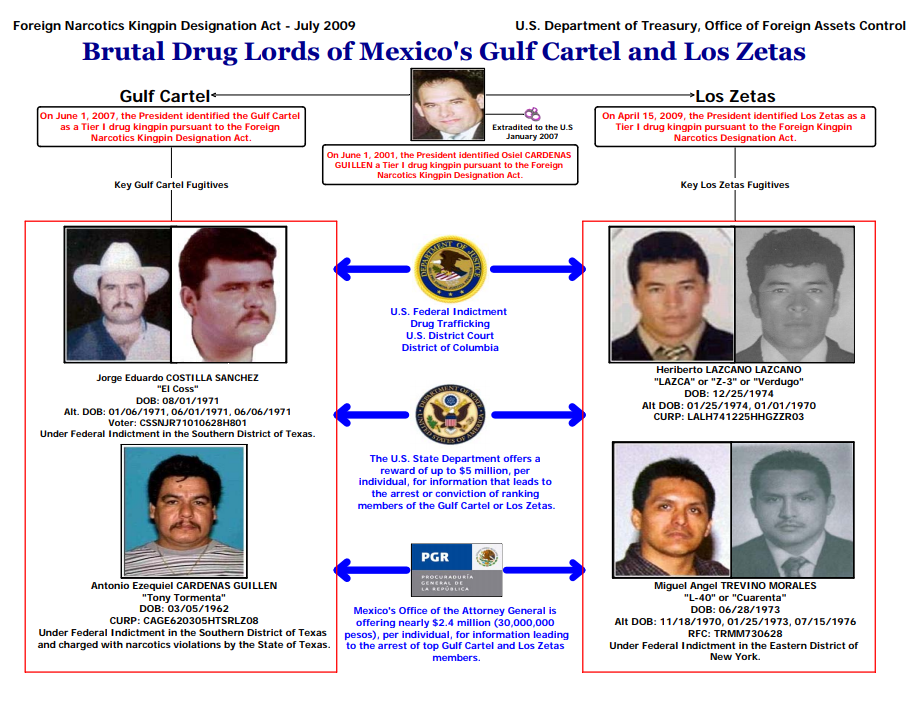
Indictment chart against leaders of the Gulf Cartel and Los Zetas, issued by the U.S. Department of the Treasury

The arrest was a significant event in the anti-crime efforts of President Vicente Fox (2000–2006). It also marked a radical shift in modus operandi of organized crime groups in Mexico; a shootout of this scale had not been seen in previous arrests of high-profile drug lords. The arrest came after six-month investigation that included undercover work. It was a combined effort by the Mexican government, the FBI, DEA, and the U.S. Customs Service, and was dubbed Operation Golden Grips. The arrest was planned in nearly absolute secrecy; the only Mexican officials aware of Cárdenas Guillén's capture were Fox, the Secretary of Defense Ricardo Clemente Vega García, and Attorney General Rafael Macedo de la Concha. The Mexican Army discovered Cárdenas Guillén's whereabouts about a week before the arrest and notified Fox, who approved the order to apprehend him. The Mexican government stated that tracing his whereabouts was a difficult task; (Note: In December 2002, four Mexican investigators were kidnapped by the Gulf Cartel: Gustavo Garza Martínez, Norma Elsa Castillo Pinales, Juan Remi Ortega Arellano, and Eduardo Díaz Reyes. They were working undercover in Tamaulipas, and Mexican authorities suspect Cárdenas Guillén may have been involved in their disappearance.) during the investigation, they discovered he had at least 300 individuals working under him and protecting him from law enforcement in various parts of Mexico.

In a press conference, Fox praised the efforts of the Army, which stated it would investigate the identity of Cárdenas Guillén's successor. In Mexico, Cárdenas Guillén had three outstanding arrest warrants for drug trafficking, money laundering, and organized crime charges; one in Mexico City and two in Tamaulipas. The PGR notified the U.S. government of the arrest because of the outstanding charges Cárdenas Guillén had in the U.S; it confirmed, however, that he would face trial in Mexico before an extradition request from the U.S. government was considered. The U.S. was enthusiastic about the arrest and recognized the efforts of the Fox administration.

In addition to Cárdenas Guillén, other Gulf Cartel members involved in the standoff were arrested and convicted. Garza Rendón turned himself in to U.S. authorities in Pharr, Texas, on 5 June 2001 after fearing for his life; he was sentenced to nine years in prison in the U.S. that year. He was deported to Mexico in 2009, where he was re-arrested on additional charges. Medrano Rodríguez was arrested on 28 March 2002 in Matamoros; he was sentenced to 44 years in prison on 12 May 2006. He was released after 2012. Vázquez Mireles was arrested in Veracruz on 1 April 2003; as of 2013, he was in prison without a conviction after a court annulled his 12-year sentence. González Pizaña was arrested in October 2004; he was given a 16-year conviction in 2014, but was released later that year after his conviction was reduced to time he had already served. De la Cruz Reyna was arrested in Polanco, Mexico City, on 30 August 2007; he was extradited to the U.S. on 31 December 2008, and sentenced to 11 years in prison on 10 October 2012. Costilla Sánchez was arrested in Tampico, Tamaulipas, in 2012; he was extradited to the U.S. in 2015.

=== Imprisonment and extraditions ===
While in prison, Cárdenas Guillén continued to lead the Gulf Cartel and created an alliance with Tijuana Cartel leader Benjamín Arellano Félix. Cárdenas Guillén and Arellano Félix orchestrated plans to destabilize La Palma, and were placed under 24-hour surveillance with limited visits from family members. In October 2003 Cárdenas Guillén planned a hunger strike with other inmates after complaining that prison authorities were limiting the availability of water for their daily showers. In December 2003, Mexican authorities discovered he had smuggled a cellphone into his prison cell. (Note: Investigators believe he commanded drug trafficking and money laundering operations with this device via his nephew José Alfredo Cárdenas Martínez.) In April 2004, he sponsored a nationwide gift delivery during Children's Day and gave money to a church. In August 2004, investigators discovered Arellano Félix and Cárdenas Guillén were planning to escape from prison with outside help from their henchmen; Cárdenas Guillén was reportedly planning to use Los Zetas to break in and free him. In January 2005, authorities also discovered that Cárdenas Guillén was depositing money into the bank accounts of several inmates and their family members to gain their favor. The same month, he ordered the execution of six prison guards in Matamoros; according to investigators, the attack was intended to show the government he was still capable of instigating violent acts. On 31 December 2005, high-ranking Sinaloa Cartel leader Arturo Guzmán Loera was killed in La Palma; investigators suspected Cárdenas Guillén may have planned the attack.

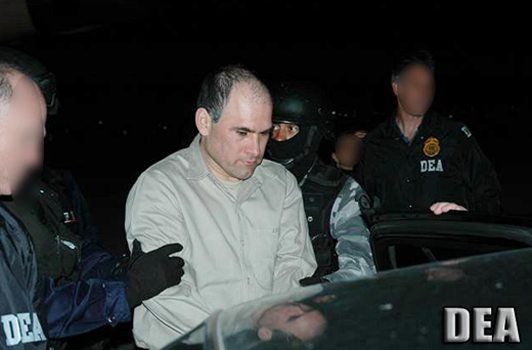
Osiel Cárdenas Guillén's extradition to the United States from Mexico

The Mexican government grew frustrated of Cárdenas Guillén's actions behind bars and decided to extradite him to the U.S. The extradition occurred on 19 January 2007, along with that of 14 other suspected criminals. He was one of the four major drug cartel leaders extradited that day; the other kingpins were Ismael and Gilberto Higuera Guerrero, former leaders of the Tijuana Cartel, and Héctor "El Güero" Palma, a former leader of the Sinaloa Cartel. The extradition came a few days after the inauguration of President Felipe Calderón (2006–2012); U.S. officials lauded Cárdenas Guillén's extradition and said they were optimistic about the new administration. U.S. officials had tried to have Cárdenas Guillén extradited to the U.S. during the Fox administration but they believed the Mexican government was reluctant to extradite criminals who faced crimes punishable with death penalties or life imprisonment; Mexico does not issue these sentences.

On 24 February 2010, Cárdenas Guillén was sentenced to 25 years in prison without possibility of parole. He was also fined US$100,000 and ordered to forfeit US$50 million; a small portion of what U.S. officials believed he generated as a leader of the Gulf Cartel. Upon his release in 2035, he will be placed in supervised release for five years. Though most of the trial was held behind closed doors, the U.S. government confirmed he pleaded guilty to threatening U.S. agents, money laundering, and drug trafficking. According to the U.S. Department of Justice, Cárdenas Guillén led a vast criminal empire that supplied multi-ton shipments of cocaine and marijuana from Mexico to the U.S., resulting in millions of dollars in drug proceeds. They also found him guilty of using violence and intimidation to further his drug conspiracies. "The successful prosecution of Cárdenas Guillén underscores the joint resolve of the United States and Mexico to pursue and prosecute the leadership of the drug trafficking cartels, dismantle their organizations and end the violence and corruption they have spawned", the prosecution said.

== See also ==
- Mexican drug war

== Sources ==
=== Bibliography ===
- Ravelo, Ricardo (2012). Osiel: Vida y tragedia de un capo (in Spanish). Penguin Random House. ISBN 978-6073107716.
- Grayson, George W. (2017). The Executioner's Men: Los Zetas, Rogue Soldiers, Criminal Entrepreneurs, and the Shadow State They Created. Routledge. ISBN 978-1351483155.
- Pérez, Ana Lilia (2016). Verdugos: Asesinatos brutales y otras historias secretas de militares (in Spanish). Penguin Random House. ISBN 978-6073138659.
- Gómez, María Idalia; Fritz, Darío (2005). Con la muerte en el bolsillo: seis desaforadas historias del narcotráfico en México (in Spanish). Planeta Group. ISBN 978-9703700271.
- Grillo, Ioan (2012). El Narco: The Bloody Rise of Mexican Drug Cartels. A & C Black. ISBN 978-1408824337.
- Gutiérrez, Alejandro (2007). Narcotráfico: el gran desafío de Calderón (in Spanish). Planeta Group. ISBN 978-9703703180.
- Deibert, Michael (2014). In the Shadow of Saint Death: The Gulf Cartel and the Price of America's Drug War in Mexico. Rowman & Littlefield. ISBN 978-1493010653.
- Longmire, Sylvia (2014). Border Insecurity: Why Big Money, Fences, and Drones Aren't Making Us Safer. St. Martin's Press. ISBN 978-1137443731.
- Correa-Cabrera, Guadalupe (2017). Los Zetas Inc.: Criminal Corporations, Energy, and Civil War in Mexico. University of Texas Press. ISBN 978-1477312773.
- Ravelo, Ricardo (2007). Los capos: las narco-rutas de México (in Spanish). Editorial Debolsillo. ISBN 978-9707804463.
