= Antonio Cárdenas Guillén =

Mexican drug lord

- Mugshot of Cárdenas
- Born: Antonio Ezequiel Cárdenas Guillén; 5 March 1962; Matamoros, Tamaulipas, Mexico
- Died: 5 November 2010 (aged 48); Matamoros, Tamaulipas, Mexico
- Cause of death: Gunshot wounds
- Other names: El Licenciado; Tony Tormenta; Marcos Ledezma; El Señor de los Truenos
- Occupation: Gulf Cartel drug lord
- Height: 1.83 m (6 ft 0 in)
- Predecessor: Osiel Cárdenas Guillén

Antonio Ezequiel Cárdenas Guillén (5 March 1962 – 5 November 2010), commonly referred to by his alias Tony Tormenta ("Tony Storm"), was a Mexican drug lord and co-leader of the Gulf Cartel, a drug trafficking organization based in Tamaulipas. He headed the criminal group along with Jorge Eduardo Costilla Sánchez. Antonio was considered by Mexican security forces to be one of Mexico's most-wanted men.

Born in Matamoros, Tamaulipas, Antonio initially worked as a car washer at a local police station with his brother Osiel Cárdenas Guillén, former leader of the cartel. By the late 1980s, he entered the drug trade, and later became the crime boss of Matamoros, where he controlled the city's drug trafficking shipments and all organized crime activities. Few details were known of Antonio's criminal career prior to 1999, when his brother Osiel confronted federal agents at gunpoint with several of his gunmen in Matamoros. In 1998, Antonio avoided arrest after FBI and DEA agents tracked his whereabouts inside a domicile in Houston. Back in Mexico, his brother Osiel was the Gulf Cartel's main leader and had created a paramilitary squad known as Los Zetas, formed by soldiers who deserted the Mexican military.

When Osiel was arrested in 2003, Antonio and Costilla Sánchez took the lead of the criminal organization, and Los Zetas eventually broke apart from the Gulf Cartel in 2010. However, Antonio was killed in an eight-hour shootout between Gulf Cartel gunmen and soldiers of the Mexican Navy in Matamoros on 5 November 2010. According to the Mexican government, ten people were killed that day in Matamoros, but local media outlets suggested that over 40 people were killed by gunfire. One anonymous law enforcement officer, witnesses, and several local newspapers indicated over 100 were killed in Matamoros.

== Criminal career ==
=== Early life ===
Antonio Ezequiel Cárdenas Guillén was born on 5 March 1962 in El Mezquital ranch in the border city of Matamoros, Tamaulipas, Mexico. As a teenager, Antonio Ezequiel and his brother Osiel earned their living by washing cars at the headquarters of the Federal Judicial Police in their hometown. By the late 1980s, Cárdenas Guillén started his criminal career under the Gulf Cartel, where he became a high-ranking leader and commanded organized crime activities and drug trafficking in Matamoros. His contact with the police in Matamoros marked the life of the Cárdenas Guillén clan; federal reports of the Procuraduría General de la República (PGR) suggest that the drug lord had solid business relations with police and military men. Witnesses indicate that Antonio frequented public places in Matamoros, Reynosa, Ciudad Victoria, and other cities in the state of Tamaulipas surrounded by a number of municipal and state police officers, whose superiors have allegedly remained loyal to the Gulf Cartel for over half a century. His henchmen reportedly wore bullet-proof vests with the Spanish insignias for the Gulf Cartel (Cártel del Golfo – C.D.G.) embellished across their chests. Although some of Antonio Ezequiel's men were reported to have worn military garbs while on duty, their uniforms have also become more subtle with time. For example, some Gulf Cartel gunmen wear tennis shoes of the same color, caps with the logo "CDG–TT" (Gulf Cartel–Tony Tormenta), or trucks emblazoned with the same logo to help them distinguish themselves from rival gangs.

A decade before ascending in the Gulf Cartel leadership rankings, Cárdenas Guillén avoided arrest by FBI and DEA agents in 1998, after they raided his home in Houston, Texas. The federal agents saw the drug lord leave, but they decided to pursue a search warrant than to chase him, given the activity in the neighborhood, the number of cars at the parking lot near his house, and the lack of sufficient agents in the operative. Inside the domicile, the US authorities discovered "cash, numerous vehicles, cocaine, marijuana, firearms and one 1996 Sea Doo Bombardier with expired Florida registration." In 1998, the federal agents knew little about Cárdenas Guillén and the criminal organization he worked for. The FBI later closed the investigation in February 1999 due to the drug lord's fugitive status, his local indictments, and the lack of information available in the Houston jurisdiction. Ten months later in November 1999, the Cárdenas Guillén surname started to gain momentum when Antonio Ezequiel's brother Osiel and several of his gunmen stopped two US federal agents at gunpoint in the streets of Matamoros. After a tense standoff, the agents convinced Osiel to let them go.

Under orders of his brother Osiel, Antonio Ezequiel ordered the drug lord Gregorio Sauceda Gamboa (alias El Goyo) and his henchmen to execute 6 prison guards in Matamoros on 20 January 2005, reportedly as a reprisal for Osiel's treatment at Altiplano prison. Their corpses were discovered inside a Ford Explorer near the Matamoros federal prison. In May 2005, he commanded a battalion of over 100 Zeta members to fight off Los Pelones, an enforcer group working for the Beltrán Leyva Cartel, in the state of Guerrero.

=== Rank accession ===
In 2003, Osiel was arrested in Matamoros following a shootout with the Mexican military, and was extradited to the United States in 2007. In exchange for a life sentence, Osiel cooperated with the U.S. authorities by supplying information on the workings of the Gulf Cartel and Los Zetas. When Osiel was arrested, Antonio Ezequiel inherited the Gulf Cartel along with Jorge Eduardo Costilla Sánchez, a former policeman in Matamoros. He and other Gulf Cartel leaders were responsible for trafficking multi-ton drug shipments of cocaine and marijuana from Mexico to the United States. Antonio Ezequiel received a federal indictment in 2008 in the District of Columbia for drug trafficking violations. He also directed the flow of narcotics through land, sea, and air from Venezuela and Colombia to Guatemala and the U.S-Mexico border. When Osiel was imprisoned, several high-ranking lieutenants in the Gulf Cartel got together to appoint leaders and their turfs. According to the declarations of Zeta leader Mateo Díaz López (alias Comandante Mateo), Antonio Ezequiel was given the turf of Matamoros, one of the leading smuggling routes for the cartel. But Antonio Ezequiel never had the edge; one of his most trusted men, Ramiro García Hernández (alias El Mati), was arrested in 2004. Deemed inexperienced, Costilla Sánchez, Lazcano, and high-ranking leader Víctor Manuel Vázquez Mireles (alias El Meme Loco) moved Antonio Ezequiel to command the Gulf Cartel in Cancún. But after failing to meet the Gulf Cartel's demands, he was replaced.

With Osiel imprisoned, however, Costilla Sánchez was deemed more powerful than Antonio Ezequiel. According to the declaration of the imprisoned drug lord Jaime González Durán (alias El Hummer), Osiel appointed Costilla Sánchez while still in prison, and left his brother Antonio as a representative of his clan. Heriberto Lazcano Lazcano, too, was part of the first tier circle, but he headed Los Zetas, while the other two commanded the Gulf Cartel directly. The triumvirate of Antonio Ezequiel, Costilla Sánchez, and Lazcano controlled the flow of narcotics from the southern state of Quintana Roo to the northern Tamaulipas state. Although initially part of a single command structure during the Osiel era, members within Los Zetas and the Gulf Cartel began to follow orders of their respective commanders. During the 1990s and early 2000s, the Gulf Cartel "operated with a certain structure that allowed for rivalries among lieutenants to exist without affecting the organization as a whole". But with Osiel's absence, several top leaders within the cartel fought to take control of the leadership void. This eventually resulted in the split of the Gulf Cartel and Los Zetas in early 2010, prompting daily shootouts and killings from both fronts. The conflict between both groups triggered in Reynosa, Tamaulipas in January 2010, when Samuel Flores Borrego of the Gulf Cartel killed a Zetas leader. When the fighting broke out in Reynosa, Antonio and Los Escorpiones, his private army, made their way into Valle Hermoso, Tamaulipas and took the city from Zetas's control. Several municipal and transit police officers – who were on Los Zetas's payroll – were hung from light poles as a message from Antonio to his rivals.

== Death ==
For at least six months, the Mexican Armed Forces were trying to hunt down Antonio Ezequiel, nearly capturing him on two occasions. The drug lord managed to avoid capture in several occasions by relying on the armed squadron known as Los Escorpiones (The Scorpions), which served as his private army. Among the first operations to capture the drug lord occurred on 31 March 2010, when the Mexican military confronted Antonio Ezequiel's bodyguards at Tres Culturas neighborhood in Matamoros. On 7 April 2010, there were two shootouts in Matamoros between Mexican marines and members of the Gulf Cartel. The intelligence information collected in these shootouts allowed the Mexican Armed Forces to locate the domicile of Antonio Ezequiel on 14 September 2010 at Fraccionamiento Río in Matamoros. But heavily armed gunmen of the Gulf Cartel intercepted the raid and protected their leader, who escaped in an armored vehicle. Two military men were killed in the operation, but the government managed to gain more information on the logistics of the inner circle of Antonio Ezequiel. On 1 November 2010, the Mexican authorities learned once again that Antonio Ezequiel was spending the night in a safe house at the Expo Fiesta Oriente neighborhood in Matamoros. But before the authorities got to the location, the drug lord left and avoided capture.

Antonio Ezequiel was killed on 5 November 2010 following an eight-hour shootout between gunmen of the Gulf Cartel and soldiers of the Mexican Navy in his hometown of Matamoros, Tamaulipas. Government sources claimed that this operation—where more than 660 marines, 17 vehicles, and 3 helicopters participated—left 10 dead: three marines, one soldier, four Gulf Cartel gunmen, journalist Carlos Alberto Guajardo Romero, and the drug lord Antonio Ezequiel. The shootout began at around 10:00 a.m. and extended to 6:00 p.m., when Antonio Ezequiel and gunmen of his inner circle were killed. The intensity of the shootout forced the temporary closure of the international bridges that connect Matamoros with the US border city of Brownsville, Texas, along with the University of Texas at Brownsville, which sits on the edge of the Rio Grande River. The daylight clashes generated a wave of panic among the citizens of Matamoros, who turned to social networks like Twitter and Facebook to report the violence. "Shelter, everyone! Don't leave your houses please. Pass the word," read one tweet. People hid inside their homes or in windowless offices, sometimes peeking to see the cartel mayhem. Witnesses reported seeing military men carrying guns, and armed Gulf Cartel members in their own military uniforms. Power went out in several parts of downtown Matamoros, where most of the heavy gunfighting took place. Communication equipment, like cellphones and radios, were not working. Gulf Cartel gunmen hijacked several buses to block roads all across the city to prevent the mobilization of the Mexican Armed Forces. Hovering helicopters from the Navy shot down at Antonio Ezequiel's henchmen. "The city was paralyzed," said an office worker who hid for hours inside a building. "It was a nightmare. It went on and on." News reports described 5 November 2010 as one of Matamoros's bloodiest days.

When the military arrived at Antonio Ezequiel's location in downtown Matamoros to arrest him at 3:30 p.m., his gunmen tried to protect the drug lord by launching several grenades and shooting at the officers. At the scene, at least 300 grenades were detonated, and gunfire perforated the building where Antonio Ezequiel hid. Gulf Cartel snipers, who hid in the rooftops of the drug lord's hiding place, shot at the Mexican marines, who later entered the building and killed Antonio Ezequiel and several bodyguards of his inner circle. Contrary to government reports, the newspapers The Brownsville Herald and The Monitor, which are based in the Rio Grande Valley, reported that at least 47 dead from the shootings that broke out on 5 November 2010 in Matamoros. According to an anonymous source inside of Mexican law enforcement, at least 30 people had been killed by noon; by the afternoon, 17 had been gunned down near the Matamoros city hall in the downtown area by grenades and heavy-calibre gunshots. Other sources varied in their countdown. Some local sources suggest that 55 or more people had been killed in the shootout. Comments left by readers at The Brownsville Herald and its sister page El Heraldo reported at least 70 dead. Although not officially confirmed, an anonymous law enforcement officer, KVEO-TV, and several online sources and witnesses mentioned that the two-day death toll in Matamoros may have "easily passed" 100. However, the exact figures of those killed in Matamoros are virtually unknown.

=== Funeral ===
The corpse of Antonio Ezequiel was given to Hermelinda Rivera (wife) and Carla Elizabeth Cárdenas Rivera (daughter) by the PGR at the Servicio Médico forensic installations in Ciudad Victoria, Tamaulipas on 9 November 2010. The family of the drug lord had plans to carry out a funeral in memory of him.

=== Aftermath ===
Antonio Ezequiel was killed by the Mexican Navy at around 6:00 p.m. in downtown Matamoros on 5 November 2010, but the roadblocks set by organized crime continued throughout the rest of the day. The drug lord had reportedly called for backup when he was surrounded by the Navy, but when he was killed, his reinforcements from Reynosa, Tamaulipas (which consisted of over 80 SUVs filled with gunmen) dispersed. The international bridges in Matamoros were reopened by 7:00 p.m. after crowds of people had waited all afternoon. In Reynosa at around 9:15 p.m., a grenade exploded inside a vehicle parked outside Plaza Real, the busiest shopping center in the city and just four miles away from the Hidalgo–Reynosa International Bridge. Reynosa also reported several shootings between the Mexican Army and organized crime on the highway that connects the city with the border town of Matamoros. In the municipalities of San Fernando, Río Bravo, Jaumave, Díaz Ordaz, Nuevo Laredo, Ciudad Mier, Guerrero, Miguel Alemán, Valle Hermoso, and Ciudad Victoria, most of the daily city activities were cancelled throughout the whole day. Organized crime gunmen and risk situations were reported in these areas, too.

Early in the morning the next day, some of the residents in Matamoros went to the site where most of the heavy fighting took place. They stood at awe as they looked at the bullet-ridden cement building and the shattered windows. Since the early morning, gossip started to surround the death of Antonio Ezequiel. Sporadic gunfire was reported in the city and in Valle Hermoso, Tamaulipas, a city south of Matamoros. Grenade attacks and armed confrontations reportedly resulted in several casualties throughout Matamoros; in Valle Hermoso, only four deaths were unofficially confirmed. Law enforcement officials confirmed that an armed confrontation broke out between gunmen of Los Zetas and the Gulf Cartel in Ejido Las Rusias neighborhood, and shootouts in the Lauro Villar and Roberto Guerra avenues in Matamoros. The casualties in these confrontations were difficult to calculate because both criminal organizations picked up the corpses of their fallen comrades and reportedly disposed them in clandestine graves. Roadblocks imposed by organized crime were set up in Reynosa following the death of Antonio Ezequiel, but it is unclear if they were directly related to his death. Phone services in the area continued to remain sporadic, with residents only able to use them at random hours of the day. With Antonio Ezequiel dead, Los Zetas celebrated the death of their rival's leader by hanging banners at pedestrian bridges in several cities in northeastern Mexico, where they mocked his brother Osiel and the Gulf Cartel. Pamphlets written with "z" instead of "s" were distributed across Matamoros with a message by Los Zetas to the general population and to members of the rival Gulf Cartel. "The group of Loz Zetaz is informing you and giving you the opportunity to join with no hard feelingz," one of the pamphlets read. "Those who don't loze their head and their dezcendants." Other banners with similar messages were put up in other states besides Tamaulipas. In the state of Veracruz, they were put up in the municipalities of Boca del Río, Medellín de Bravo, Poza Rica, Acayucan, Coatzacoalcos, Martínez de la Torre, Pánuco, Pueblo Viejo, Tampico Alto and Tantoyuca. In Nuevo León, most of the banners were put up in Monterrey, but the authorities also reported in the municipalities of Cadereyta, Juárez, Guadalupe and San Pedro Garza García. More banners were reported in San Luis Potosí, Oaxaca, and Quintana Roo.

On 6 November 2010, U.S. President Barack Obama contacted former Mexican President Felipe Calderón by phone and expressed his full support to put an end to the impunity of Mexico's organized crime syndicates. He expressed his condolences for the Mexican servicemen and the journalist who died in the operative.

Among the most intense battles between the Gulf Cartel and Los Zetas following the death of Antonio Ezequiel occurred in Ciudad Mier, Tamaulipas, a small, painteresque town on the U.S.-Mexico border. Roughly five days after the drug lord's death, over 300 people left the town to shelter in the nearby city of Miguel Alemán, while others left to seek refuge with family members that resided in Starr and Zapata County in Texas. Ciudad Mier experienced rounds of drug cartel violence because the area is a strategic route for drug traffickers. The highway that connects Ciudad Mier with Monterrey is a lucrative smuggling route for narcotics. The Mexican government responded to the citizens' plea by sending reinforcements to restore order because the violence had been "non-stop in Ciudad Mier since [Antonio Ezequiel's] death." But by the end of 2010, around 95% of the population in Ciudad Mier had left and relocated elsewhere due to the violence generated by Los Zetas and the Gulf Cartel. In 2011, President Calderón visited the border town and inaugurated a military barrack for the 105th battalion in the municipality. After long periods of sporadic violence, Ciudad Mier returned to normal in early 2013. Residents credit the presence of the Mexican Armed Forces for returning peace to the border town. "Thanks to the army, families are coming back," said a school principal from Ciudad Mier.

Antonio Ezequiel was succeeded by Costilla Sánchez and his brother Mario Cárdenas Guillén, arrested on 3 September 2012. His nephew Rafael Cárdenas Vela became the regional leader of the Gulf Cartel in Matamoros but he was displaced by Costilla Sánchez and was arrested on 20 October 2011. A month later in November 2011, Antonio Ezequiel's son Ezequiel Cárdenas Rivera was arrested by the Navy along with four other Gulf Cartel members in Matamoros. Since Antonio Ezequiel was killed, the Gulf Cartel separated into two different factions: Los Rojos, a group loyal to the Cárdenas Guillén family; and Los Metros, a group started by Costilla Sánchez.

=== Analysis of repercussions ===
Shortly after Antonio Ezequiel was killed, a mood of uncertainty surrounded civilians and authorities. Most feared that his death would shake the criminal underworld in Tamaulipas and herald more violence from Los Zetas, who might look to carry out a full-scale incursion in the Gulf Cartel territories and carry out kidnappings, extortions, and other violent acts in the state. Malcolm Beith, author of the book "The Last Narco", stated shortly after Antonio Ezequiel's death that Zeta leader Heriberto Lazcano Lazcano was possibly going to move deep into Tamaulipas and try to fight the remaining forces of the Gulf Cartel, thereby creating more violence. Researcher Humberto Palomares said, "They [the government] cut off one head and many more grow back [and create violence]", in reference to the fall of Antonio Ezequiel. Stratfor and border security expert Sylvia Longmire, however, believed that Antonio Ezequiel's death was not going to drastically alter the dynamics of the criminal world, and that his absence may possibly bring some level of relative peace in the Tamaulipas area. The intelligence agency stated that Antonio Ezequiel was only a leader in the Gulf Cartel because of his brother Osiel; Costilla Sánchez, on the other hand, was the one who actually controlled the day-to-day operations. Antonio Ezequiel was also known for his explosive personality and cocaine addiction. It was rumored that the drug lord was hot-tempered and lived an outlandish lifestyle, and that many commanders within the Gulf Cartel believed in more than one occasion that his position as leader threatened the whole organization. Longmire believed that Los Zetas would move into Reynosa and Matamoros shortly after the drug lord's death to "test the waters", but she stated that the Gulf Cartel, under the command of Costilla Sánchez, stood a chance to fight them off and continue its illicit activities.

Former President Felipe Calderón made taking down drug kingpins a security priority of his political administration (2006–2012). His aggressive campaign against organized crime successfully removed many drug cartel leaders from Mexico's leading drug trafficking organizations. However, his strategy has also been criticized for sparking more violence. When a drug baron is arrested or killed, the criminal organization may experiences a leadership void, which leads to infighting for succession, possible fragmentation, and new competition from other crime syndicates. This practice, commonly referred to as the "kingpin strategy", worked to bring down the hegemony of the Cali and the Medellín Cartels in Colombia in the 1990s. But its implementation in Mexico has brought more violence and has led to instability in the criminal underworld. However, the Mexican government provides a different interpretation of the strategy. They suggest that violence does not increase in Mexico's already violent states, and that troops are sent when violence already exists in an area. Therefore, the strategy is a product, not the cause, of the violence.

== Los Escorpiones ==
Antonio Ezequiel commanded an elite enforcer group known as Los Escorpiones (The Scorpions), which served as his private army during the 5 November 2010 shootout in Matamoros that resulted in the drug lord's death. Los Escorpiones reportedly set up roadblocks, rocket-propelled grenade attacks, and snipers to prevent the capture of their leader. According to the PGR and the Mexican Armed Forces, the group was originally formed by Antonio Ezequiel in 2002 as a parallel to his brother's personal army, Los Zetas. However, his brother Osiel never approved of the group's creation and subsequently cut all communication with him, although he allowed him to work on his own. Known for their brutal tactics, Los Escorpiones is composed of at least 60 former state, judicial, and municipal police officers. The enforcer group served as the armed wing of the Gulf Cartel, and they were key in the territorial war against Los Zetas in Reynosa and Matamoros in the first half of 2010.

Along with Antonio Ezequiel, the following members of Los Escorpiones were killed on 5 November 2010 in Matamoros: Sergio Antonio Fuentes (alias El Tyson or Escorpión 1); Raúl Marmolejo Gómez (alias Escorpión 18) Hugo Lira (alias Escorpión 26) and Refugio Adalberto Vargas Cortés (alias Escorpión 42). The arrests of Marco Antonio Cortez Rodríguez (alias Escorpión 37) and of Josué González Rodríguez (alias Escorpión 43) allowed the authorities to understand the structure of Los Escorpiones. There are several music videos on YouTube that exalt the power of Los Escorpiones through narcocorridos, a Mexican drug ballad that tells stories of drug lords and their exploits.

== Charges and bounty ==
Antonio Ezequiel was one of the eleven most-wanted Mexican fugitives sought by the Drug Enforcement Administration (DEA). He was charged in a 2008 federal indictment in the District of Columbia, and the United States Department of State was offering a reward of up to US$5 million for information leading to his arrest and/or conviction. The Mexican government under the Attorney General of Mexico (PGR) was offering a $30 million pesos bounty (about US$2.5 million).

According to the U.S. Department of State and the DEA, Antonio Ezequiel was 6 ft (1.83 m) tall, and weighed approximately 215 lbs (97.5 kilos). He had an alternative date of birth on 5 May 1962. He had black-colored hair and brown eyes, and his aliases were Marcos Ledezma, El Licenciado (The Certified or The Lawyer), and Tony Tormenta (Tony the Storm), which he earned for his explosive personality and for beheading and torturing his rivals.

=== Kingpin Act sanction ===
On 20 July 2009, the United States Department of the Treasury sanctioned Antonio Ezequiel under the Foreign Narcotics Kingpin Designation Act (sometimes referred to simply as the "Kingpin Act"), for his involvement in drug trafficking along with three other international criminals. The act prohibited U.S. citizens and companies from doing any kind of business activity with him, and virtually froze all his assets in the U.S.

== In popular culture ==
A character loosely based on Antonio Cárdenas Guillén was featured in the 2017 TV series El Chapo.

== See also ==
- Mexican drug war
