= El Licenciado =

El Licenciado (The Professional) may refer to:

- Adán Medrano Rodríguez (born 1969), convicted Mexican drug lord
- Óscar Malherbe de León (born 1964), convicted Mexican drug lord
