= Carlos Alberto Guajardo Romero =

Mexican crime journalist and murder victim

- Born: c. 1973
- Died: 5 November 2010 (age 37); Matamoros, Tamaulipas, Mexico
- Cause of death: Shooting
- Body discovered: Pedro Cárdenas avenue (Inside his vehicle)
- Resting place: Panteón Jardín (Cemetery)
- Occupation: Journalist
- Organization: Expreso de Matamoros
- Spouse: Patricia Guajardo Adame

Carlos Alberto Guajardo Romero (c. 1973 – November 5, 2010) was a Mexican journalist and crime reporter who worked for the Expreso de Matamoros local newspaper in the border city of Matamoros, Tamaulipas.

While covering a shootout between drug traffickers of the Gulf Cartel and the Mexican Army in the streets of Matamoros on 5 November 2010, Guajardo Romero was caught in the crossfire and killed. His pickup was shot more than 20 times, reportedly by military officers who mistook him for one of the drug traffickers involved in the gunfight. Guajardo Romero had left home earlier that day to cover the military-led operation targeting Antonio Cárdenas Guillén, one of Mexico's most-wanted drug lords, who was killed that afternoon.

News reports described 5 November 2010 as one of bloodiest days in Matamoros' history. While the official death toll was 10, local newspapers and eyewitnesses reported from 50 to 100 dead as a result of the gunbattles.

== Career ==
Guajardo Romero was a journalist who worked for local daily Expreso de Matamoros as a print and crime beat reporter in Matamoros, Tamaulipas since 2008. He had previously worked for three other local newspapers: El Bravo, El Mañana, and El Contacto.

Guajardo was also member of the Journalists Association of Matamoros ("Asociación de Periodistas de Matamoros").

Although not confirmed, several journalists in Matamoros and Reynosa, Tamaulipas described Guajardo Romero as an enlace (informant) of the Gulf Cartel.

=== Death ===
Guajardo Romero, 37, left his home at around 11:00 a.m. to cover a gunfight between the gunmen of the Gulf Cartel and the Mexican Armed Forces in the Mexican border city of Matamoros, Tamaulipas. While heading to the Secretariat of Homeland Security to gather more information, Guajardo Romero was caught in the crossfire and killed. His pickup truck was shot at least 20 times, reportedly by soldiers who mistook him for a drug trafficker involved in the shootout. According to reports by the Mexican Army, a convoy of eight vehicles from the Gulf Cartel opened fire at several soldiers at around 11:00 a.m. in Fraccionamiento Victoria neighborhood in southern Matamoros. One soldier was killed, while two others were wounded and taken to the nearest hospital. When the smoke cleared, the soldiers discovered the corpse of Guajardo Romero; it was not clear if the journalist was killed by bullets from the Army or from drug traffickers. Guajardo Romero was found dead inside his white Ford Lobo on Pedro Cárdenas avenue and was recognized by his brother, who is also a journalist.

The incident was one among a number of armed confrontations and violent events that were registered that day in Matamoros, and led to the death of the drug lord Antonio Cárdenas Guillén, the former co-leader of the Gulf Cartel.

Guajardo Romero was buried in the Panteón Jardín cemetery in Matamoros, Tamaulipas on 6 November 2010.

==== Context ====
Since 2006, Mexico has been in a prolonged drug war with rival drug trafficking organizations, and violence from the drug war has spilled over from conflicts between Mexican military and the cartels to the general population, including journalists. President Felipe Calderón first confronted the drug cartels militarily in 2006, and has used the Mexican Armed Forces to fight them. The Gulf Cartel, which was headed by the drug lord Antonio Cárdenas Guillén, is primarily involved in the cocaine and marijuana trade through the Matamoros−Brownsville corridor. Mexico has one of the most abundant crops of illicit drugs in the world. The arrest of Antonio's brother Osiel Cárdenas Guillén in 2003, among other factors, caused the split and rivalry between the Gulf Cartel and Los Zetas.

The drug cartels have fought back violently against the military and have used violence to strike fear on the civilian population. In addition, journalists have also been targets of the drug gangs when they have reported on their criminal activities.

==== Reactions ====
In a phone call between President Barack Obama and President Felipe Calderon, Obama offered his condolences for the loss of Mexican lives in the gunfight, which included Carlos Guajardo.

The Ministry of National Defense (SEDENA) in Mexico released the following statement: "Generals, chiefs, army officers and air force personnel, together express their condolences of our supreme citizen commander Felipe Calderon Hinojosa, President of the Republic, towards the families of our fellow soldier and the journalist Carlos Guajardo-Romero, who both lost their lives in the line of duty."

Gregorio Salazar, director of International Federation of Journalists' Latin American office, said: "Danger is never far away for our Mexican colleagues who operate in one of the most hostile environment for media. The need for better protection and a safer practice of journalism has never been greater in Mexico."

The Expreso de Matamoros newspaper issued an article speaking out against the drug-related violence in the state of Tamaulipas and asking for an extensive investigation for the death of their reporter.

Guajardo's death marked the 11th Mexican journalist to have been killed while reporting in Mexico in 2010 and the 66th killed since the year 2000.

== Legacy ==
Guajardo Romero is survived by his wife Patricia Guajardo Adame and his three children. Patricia was presented with a plaque by the La Asociación de Periodistas de Matamoros in January 2011 as a tribute to Guajardo's contributions to the journalism profession.

== See also ==
- Mexican drug war
- List of journalists killed in Mexico
