= José Luis Santiago Vasconcelos =

Mexican lawyer, politician and civil servant

José Luis Santiago Vasconcelos (7 June 1957 – 4 November 2008) was a Mexican lawyer, politician and civil servant.

Santiago Vasconcelos, a native of Mexico City, earned a law degree at the National Autonomous University of Mexico (UNAM). In 1993 he began working for the office of the federal Attorney-General (PGR), in the drug-trafficking control area. He was later appointed Assistant Attorney-General for Legal and International Affairs and, following that appointment, served as Assistant Attorney-General at the Organized Crime Specialized Investigation Office (SIEDO), Mexico's top anti-drug prosecutor. The last position he held was as head of the PGR's technical secretariat for implementing the recent constitutional reforms on criminal justice and public security.

He died on 4 November 2008 when the aircraft he was traveling on crashed in Mexico City, killing all nine persons on board, including his friend, Secretary of the Interior Juan Camilo Mouriño, and seven people on the ground.
