= Jorge Eduardo Costilla Sánchez =

Mexican drug lord (born 1971)

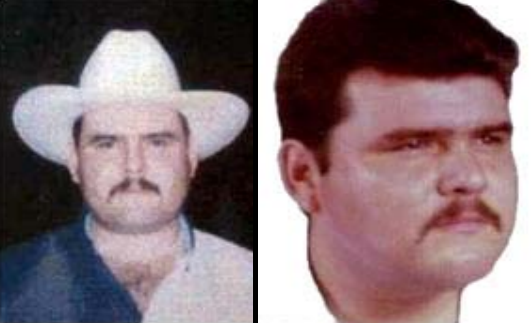
- Born: 6 January 1971 (age 55); Matamoros, Tamaulipas, Mexico
- Other names: Cos; Costi; El Coss; Sombra; George XX
- Occupation: Former leader of the Gulf Cartel
- Employer: Matamoros Municipal Police (1992 - 1995)
- Predecessor: Osiel Cárdenas Guillén
- Successor: Mario Ramírez Treviño
- Opponents: Los Zetas; Los Rojos
- Criminal charges: Drug trafficking, money laundering, murder, assault
- Criminal penalty: Life imprisonment
- Criminal status: Incarcerated

Jorge Eduardo Costilla Sánchez (born 6 January 1971) is a former Mexican drug lord and top leader of the criminal drug trafficking organization known as the Gulf Cartel. He was among Mexico's most-wanted drug lords, until his arrest in 2012.

He joined the ranks of the Gulf Cartel in the late 1990s after he had served as a policeman in Matamoros, Tamaulipas. Under the tutelage of Osiel Cárdenas Guillén, Costilla Sánchez became a lieutenant for the cartel and started controlling several drug trafficking activities for the organization. In 1999, two U.S. federal agents were stopped at gunpoint in Matamoros by several gunmen of the cartel while conducting an investigation. Among the dozen heavily armed men were Cárdenas Guillén and Costilla Sánchez. After the tense standoff, the agents persuaded the gunmen to let them go, but Costilla Sánchez and the other cartel members earned a U.S. indictment.

When Cárdenas Guillén was arrested and extradited to the United States in 2003 and 2007 respectively, Costilla Sánchez took the control of the cartel along with Antonio Cárdenas Guillén, who was later killed in a gunbattle in November 2010. Amid the power struggles, Los Zetas separated from the cartel to work independently initially working in tandem with the gulf cartel as an organisation known as la compania, until in 2010 going to war transforming northeastern Mexico into a "war zone" with daily confrontations and gruesome assassinations.

Costilla Sánchez was arrested by the Mexican marines in the city of Tampico, Tamaulipas, on 12 September 2012. The Gulf Cartel, however, was suffering from an infighting by the time of his arrest.

On 16 September 2022, Costilla Sánchez pleaded guilty to conspiracy to distribute cocaine and marijuana into the United States. He was sentenced to life in prison and was ordered to pay a forfeiture judgement of $5 million.

== Criminal career ==
Costilla Sánchez was born on 6 January 1971 in the city of Matamoros, Tamaulipas; he is the son of a woman who worked as the principal of a middle school in Matamoros. At the age of 21, he became a municipal police officer in Matamoros and worked from 1992 to 1995, where he became familiar with the drug trade. Costilla Sánchez then left the police and formed a kidnapping ring called "Los Sierra."

He joined the works of the Gulf Cartel in the late 1990s and become a lieutenant during the reign of then-leader Osiel Cárdenas Guillén. The Gulf Cartel is responsible for the importation and distribution of thousands of kilograms of cocaine and marijuana into the United States annually. After the arrest of the cartel leader Osiel Cardenas, Costilla Sánchez took control and became partner with Antonio Cárdenas Guillén, Heriberto Lazcano and Héctor Manuel Sauceda Gamboa (El Karis). Sauceda was killed in a gun battle with the Federal Police on 17 February 2009, and Heriberto Lazcano transformed Los Zetas into his own cartel in 2010, becoming rival to the Gulf Cartel.

Costilla Sánchez is one of a number of high-ranking members of the Gulf Cartel who has been indicted in the United States for drug trafficking activities. Costilla Sánchez has also been indicted for threatening U.S. law enforcement officials in November 1999. In that incident, FBI and DEA agents in Mexico were forcibly stopped at gunpoint by a group of heavily armed men, allegedly including Costilla Sánchez and other key members of the Gulf Cartel. Costilla Sánchez and the other cartel members were said to have pointed AK-47 rifles at the U.S. federal agents and threatened to kill them. After a tense standoff, the FBI and DEA agents were allowed to leave.

When Osiel was arrested in 2003, Costilla Sánchez joined the drug lord's brother, Antonio Cárdenas Guillén, in running the Gulf Cartel's operations. The power struggle after Osiel's extradition in 2007 prompted for Los Zetas, the mercenary gang formed by ex-commandos of the Mexican Army and the former armed wing of the cartel, to separate and form their own criminal organization. Both groups officially went to war in early 2010, after a Zeta leader was assassinated allegedly under orders of Costilla Sánchez. The fight between the Gulf Cartel and Los Zetas transformed northeastern Mexico into a "war zone" with daily gunfights, decapitations, and other gruesome slayings. After the death of Antonio in a gunfight with the Mexican Marines on 5 November 2010, Costilla Sánchez took full control of the Gulf Cartel and began directing the daily drug trafficking activities of the organization.

The recent fights between Los Metros and Los Rojos, the two subgroups within the Gulf Cartel, were reportedly caused by Costilla Sánchez, who set up his rivals to get arrested or killed by the government. Among other charges, Costilla Sánchez is accused of being involved in the 2004 assassination of the journalist Francisco Arratia Saldierna, who covered drug trafficking and organized crime reports in Matamoros. In addition, the Proceso magazine alleges that Costilla Sánchez had some connections with high-ranking military officials in the Mexican Armed Forces between 2011 and 2012.

=== Standoff with U.S. agents ===
On 9 November 1999, two U.S. agents from the Drug Enforcement Administration (DEA) and Federal Bureau of Investigation (FBI) were threatened at gunpoint by Cárdenas Guillén, Costilla Sánchez, and approximately fifteen of his henchmen in Matamoros. The two agents travelled to Matamoros with an informant to gather intelligence on the operations of the Gulf Cartel. Cárdenas Guillén demanded the agents and the informant to get out of their vehicle, but they refused to obey his orders. The incident escalated as Cárdenas Guillén threatened to kill them if they did not comply and as his gunmen prepared to shoot. The agents tried to reason with him that killing U.S. federal agents would bring a massive manhunt from the U.S. government. Cárdenas Guillén eventually let them go and threatened to kill them if they ever returned to his home turf.

The standoff triggered a massive law enforcement effort to crackdown the leadership structure of the Gulf Cartel. Both the Mexican and U.S. government increased their efforts to apprehend Cárdenas Guillén. Prior to the standoff, he was regarded as a minor player in the international drug trade, but this incident catapulted his reputation and made him one of the most-wanted criminals. The FBI and the DEA mounted numerous charges against him and issued a US$2 million bounty for his arrest.

=== Gulf-Zeta cartels split ===
In the late 1990s, Osiel Cárdenas Guillén, then leader of the Gulf Cartel, began recruiting members of the Mexican Army to protect his territory, personnel, and drug trafficking operations. These original deserters, who were known as Los Zetas, came from the Special Forces squadron of the army, arguably the best trained branch of the Mexican military. Upon the arrest and extradition of Cárdenas Guillén in 2003 and 2007 respectively, Los Zetas strengthen its role in the Gulf Cartel, but managed to retain its alliance. Nonetheless, that alliance lasted until early 2010, when disagreements reached a turning point. On 18 January 2010, several members of the Gulf Cartel kidnapped Víctor Peña Mendoza, a leader of Los Zetas nicknamed Concord 3 and a close associate and friend of Miguel Treviño Morales, alias Z-40. When he was held captive, Peña Mendoza was asked to switch alliances and join the Gulf Cartel, but he refused, earning a beating and an execution, presumably carried out by Samuel Flores Borrego.

Treviño Morales heard about the incident and issued an ultimatum to Flores Borrego and Costilla Sánchez:

"Hand over the assassin of my friend, you son of a bitch ... You have until the 25th, if you don't comply, there will be war."

Both of the Gulf Cartel leaders ignored the command, and Treviño Morales did not wait to avenge the death of his friend. On 30 January 2010, Treviño Morales kidnapped and murdered 16 Gulf Cartel members in Reynosa, Tamaulipas, marking the start of the cartel war between the Gulf Cartel and Los Zetas in the Mexican states of Tamaulipas, Nuevo León, and Veracruz that has left thousands of people killed. Los Zetas used violent and intimidation tactics to expand, emerging with a notorious reputation as Mexico's most violent drug trafficking organization. Through these tactics, it has managed to take control of most of the territories "owned" by the Gulf Cartel where they had once essentially served as a single organization.

=== PRI candidate assassination ===
On the morning of 28 June 2010, Rodolfo Torre Cantú, the leading candidate of the Institutional Revolutionary Party (PRI) for the Tamaulipas state elections, was heading to the airport in Ciudad Victoria to close his campaign in Valle Hermoso and Matamoros, Tamaulipas six days before the elections. While heading to the airport, Torre Cantú's convoy was ambushed by armed assailants, killing the candidate and six other people who were in his entourage. His death marked the highest-profile murder in the Mexican drug war and the highest-profile assassination in Mexico since the death of Luis Donaldo Colosio, the PRI presidential candidate for the 1994 elections. By 2011 and into 2012, the Mexican authorities still did not have solid evidence to prosecute Torre Cantú's assassins.

Nonetheless, Costilla Sánchez was linked to Torre Cantú's assassination by the PGR and the DEA agencies on 20 September 2012. Reportedly, Torre Cantú was killed by an armed squad directly linked to Costilla Sánchez for refusing to protect the cartel's investments that allowed money laundering from drug proceeds. Tamaulipas' former governor, Tomás Yarrington, has also been linked to Torre Cantú's death by the DEA since February 2012.

=== Arrest ===
The Mexican Navy arrested Costilla Sánchez on 12 September 2012 at the residential Lomas de Rosales neighborhood in Tampico, Tamaulipas without firing a single bullet. Around 30 marines chased a convoy of gunmen that led to the house where Costilla Sánchez was staying. Hours before the arrest, five men working for Costilla Sánchez were apprehended in Río Bravo, Tamaulipas. Costilla Sánchez was presented on camera on the morning of 13 September 2012, handcuffed and wearing a long-sleeve shirt. Ten bodyguards of Costilla Sánchez were also arrested during the operation. Ernesto Banda Chaires, one of the detainees, is believed to be the regional boss of the cartel in Tampico. In the Wednesday arrest, the Mexican authorities confiscated several assault rifles, pistols encrusted with jewelry, and a number of expensive-looking watches. When asked if he had anything to say about his criminal charges and if he had a lawyer, Costilla Sánchez shook his head. His arrest came a few days after the apprehension of Mario Cárdenas Guillén, the leader of one of factions in the cartel. Moreover, Costilla Sánchez is currently detained at the installations of the SIEDO, Mexico's intelligence agency.

Costilla Sánchez was an evasive capo who preferred to stay low-profile. Only two photographs of him were ever made public prior to his arrest.

It is likely that Costilla Sánchez will be extradited to the United States, raising political implications for the top politicians in the states of Tamaulipas and Veracruz who have been accused of taking bribes from the Gulf Cartel. Among them is Tomás Yarrington, the former governor of Tamaulipas who is now a fugitive. If the testimonies end up being damaging, President Enrique Peña Nieto will have to take steps to clean up the image of the Institutional Revolutionary Party (PRI), which governed Mexico for 71 years and was tainted with an image of corruption. In addition, with Costilla Sánchez's capture, the Gulf Cartel appears to be extremely weakened and the stage is set for Mexico's two largest criminal organizations – the Sinaloa Cartel and Los Zetas – to fight for the turf of the Gulf Cartel. This will be troubling for the government, which has vowed to reduce the drug violence that has left more than 55,000 dead in six years.

Two days after the arrest of Costilla Sánchez, 16 people were killed as a result of the Gulf Cartel infighting in two separate attacks carried out in Nuevo Laredo and San Fernando, Tamaulipas. Reportedly, a message was left aside the bodies, which were dumped in public view.

==== Theoretical aftermaths ====
The capture of Costilla Sánchez and Mario Cárdenas Guillén leaves the Gulf Cartel without a definite successor. Both arrests, in effect, wipe out the traditional old-time bosses of the cartel, putting an end to a generation of drug traffickers. When Cárdenas Guillén was arrested on 4 September 2012, it looked as if Costilla Sánchez had finally won the leadership of the Gulf Cartel. Throughout the end of 2011 and until the time of his arrest in 2012, Costilla Sánchez had carried out a campaign to put down Cárdenas Guillén and his faction – the Rojos – by reportedly setting up its members to get arrested or killed. His attempts to successfully put down his rivals allegedly gave him the protection of some high-ranking officials in the Mexican Armed Forces.

Nonetheless, Costilla Sánchez's own tactics backfired after a group of his henchmen arrested in Río Bravo, Tamaulipas reportedly betrayed him and notified the authorities of his whereabouts. It is also possible Cárdenas Guillén's declarations resulted in the apprehension of Costilla Sánchez as well.

Without a clear successor of Costilla Sánchez, his faction – the Metros – could come to an end, although it is still likely that there are other old-crime bosses of lesser importance still trying to keep the Gulf Cartel operating. With the arrest of a Gulf Cartel representative in Colombia on 10 September 2012, the drug business could be disrupted even further. One clear benefactor of the fall of the Gulf Cartel is its rival group, Los Zetas. It is also possible that several within the Gulf Cartel may decide to join the Sinaloa Cartel or Los Zetas, although the latter seems unlikely given the bitter feelings between both groups. The Mexican government has essentially gotten rid of the leadership in both the Metros and the Rojos factions in the Gulf Cartel. The first possible group to take control of the smuggling routes in Tamaulipas is Los Zetas, who can decide to make a violent push into the last territories of the Gulf Cartel and finally take control of Matamoros, Tamaulipas. That city is the birthplace of the Gulf Cartel and has been the stronghold of the cartel ever since its creation. By taking Matamoros, Los Zetas will not only take a valuable drug corridor from the hands of the cartel, but it can score a major "psychological victory" over the Gulf Cartel.

As of mid-2013, however, Los Zetas is also experiencing a power struggle within its own ranks, so the future of the Gulf Cartel is difficult to predict.

The Mexican authorities believe that the next leader of the Gulf Cartel could be a woman, presumably one of the two sisters of Osiel, Antonio, and Mario. While women leading Mexico's "macho" criminal underworld is quite unusual, it is not entirely unprecedented. Enedina Arellano Félix of the Tijuana Cartel now manages the organization along with her son Luis Fernando Sánchez Arellano. Another woman, Sandra Ávila Beltrán, served as an important link between the Sinaloa Cartel and the Norte del Valle Cartel in Colombia until her arrest in 2007. The authorities believe that if one of the Cárdenas Guillén sisters takes over leadership of the Gulf Cartel, it could serve to unite the broken organization. Nonetheless, InSight Crime argues that if the Gulf Cartel's last chance to regain its hegemony lies on a female successor, there is little chance that the cartel will ever recover. As previously reported by the agency, "drug queens" in Mexico tend to have difficulty commanding their cartels, and have been forced to work alongside men to legitimize their positions.

In addition, the arrest of Costilla Sánchez opens a bigger role for the Sinaloa Cartel in the state of Tamaulipas. Since their leader Joaquín "El Chapo" Guzmán and the Gulf Cartel tend to be "business-oriented," both organizations may possibly strengthen their alliances by acknowledging that "violence is bad for business." This is one reason why the Gulf Cartel and El Chapo might fight off Los Zetas together. Mario Ramírez Treviño, the right-hand man of the fallen Samuel Flores Borrego, was the next in line after Costilla Sánchez. Nonetheless, whoever decides to lead the Gulf Cartel will most likely have a close relationship with El Chapo. The Gulf Cartel is knowledgeable of the trafficking routes and operations in Tamaulipas, and it would not be convenient for the Sinaloa Cartel to take them "out of the picture." If the Sinaloa Cartel manages to have significant presence in Tamaulipas, the population can expect a decrease in violence just like in Tijuana and Ciudad Juárez, which saw downturns in drug-related homicides after the Sinaloa Cartel gained control of the smuggling routes.

== Extradition and case ==
On 30 September 2015, Costilla Sánchez was extradited to the U.S. along with twelve other criminals, including former high-ranking Beltrán Leyva Cartel leader Edgar Valdez Villarreal. On 1 October, he declared himself not guilty of the charges imposed at a federal court in Brownsville, Texas. On 26 September 2017, he pleaded guilty to conspiracy to possess narcotics with intent to distribute cocaine and cannabis, in addition to two counts of assault on federal agents for the standoff in 1999. His sentencing was originally scheduled for 18 January 2018. On 22 September 2022, Costilla Sánchez was sentenced to life in prison and was ordered to pay a forfeiture judgment of $5 million, the amount that he was found to have profited from his involvement in drug trafficking.

== Gulf Cartel infighting ==
=== Background ===
In the late 1990s, Osiel Cárdenas Guillén, the former leader of the Gulf Cartel, had other similar groups besides Los Zetas established in several cities in Tamaulipas. Each of these groups were identified by their radio codes: the Rojos were based in Reynosa; the Metros were headquartered in Matamoros; and the Lobos were established in Laredo. The infighting between the Metros and the Rojos of the Gulf Cartel began in 2010, when Juan Mejía González, nicknamed El R-1, was overlooked as the candidate of the regional boss of Reynosa and was sent to La Frontera Chica, an area that encompasses Miguel Alemán, Camargo and Ciudad Mier – directly across the U.S.–Mexico border from Starr County, Texas. The area that Mejía González wanted was given to Samuel Flores Borrego, suggesting that the Metros were above the Rojos.

Unconfirmed information released by The Monitor indicated that two leaders of the Rojos, Mejía González and Rafael Cárdenas Vela, teamed up to kill Flores Borrego. Cárdenas Vela had held a grudge on Flores Borrego and the Metros because he believed that they had led the Mexican military to track down and kill his uncle Antonio Cárdenas Guillén (Tony Tormenta) on 5 November 2010. Other sources indicate that the infighting could have been caused by the suspicions that the Rojos were "too soft" on the Gulf Cartel's bitter enemy, Los Zetas. When the Gulf Cartel and Los Zetas split in early 2010, some members of the Rojos stayed with the Gulf Cartel, while others decided to leave and join the forces of Los Zetas.

InSight Crime explains that the fundamental disagreement between the Rojos and the Metros was over leadership. Those who were more loyal to Mario Cárdenas Guillén stayed with the Rojos, while those loyal to Jorge Eduardo Costilla Sánchez, like Flores Borrego, defended the Metros.

Originally, the Gulf Cartel was running smoothly, but the infighting between the two factions in the Gulf Cartel triggered when Samuel Flores Borrego was killed on 2 September 2011. When the Rojos turned on the Metros, the largest faction in the Gulf Cartel, firefights broke throughout Tamaulipas and drug loads were stolen among each other, but the Metros managed to retain control of the major cities that stretched from Matamoros to Miguel Alemán, Tamaulipas.

== Alleged ties with the Mexican military ==
The power struggle within the Gulf Cartel in northeastern Mexico throughout 2011 and 2012 was a sign of the organization's decline. Part of the shifting landscape, according to Proceso magazine, is attributed to the alleged protection the Mexican Armed Forces gave to Costilla Sánchez. An anonymous source told the magazine that Costilla Sánchez set up his rivals, the Cárdenas Guillén family, to get arrested or killed by the Mexican Navy, consequently allowing him to emerge as the leader of the Gulf Cartel. Costilla Sánchez reportedly gave millions of dollars to the Navy to allow him to operate freely in Tamaulipas, and in return the Navy reportedly protected his faction by ceasing to target them and going against the Cárdenas Guillén clan.

The last days of Costilla Sánchez's leadership began on 3 September 2012, when several banners were reportedly put up in Ecatepec, State of Mexico, accusing the capitan of the Mexican Naval Infantry, Marina Efraín Martínez Talamantes, of protecting Costilla Sánchez. Nine days later, Costilla Sánchez was arrested in an operative where not a single shot was fired. The anonymous source said that the Navy arrested him because the accusations were starting to gain some weight, while others said that once the Navy was done "using Costilla Sánchez" to their advantage, they "betrayed him" so that his capture could serve as a symbolic medal for the Navy and the administration of Felipe Calderón. The sources stated that before his arrest, Costilla Sánchez was allegedly seeking to forge an alliance with Miguel Treviño Morales (Z-40), one of the leaders of Los Zetas, the former armed wing of the Gulf Cartel.

InSight Crime, however, states that the fact that the whole article relies on a single anonymous source and that there are no voice recordings raises suspicions about the reliability of the story. The agency does recognize that Costilla Sánchez's ties with the Navy were possible, but indicated that "if his enemies were looking to make life difficult both for him and for the military units operating in Tamaulipas, feeding falsehoods to reporters would be an easy way to do so."

== Bounty ==
Costilla Sánchez was placed among the most-wanted drug lords in Mexico, and the government was offering a 30 million pesos (US$2.3 million) bounty for information leading to his arrest. In the United States, he has been charged with 12 counts of drug trafficking and money-laundering and is also wanted for assaulting a federal law enforcement officers in 1999 in Matamoros, Tamaulipas.

The U.S. Department of State was offering a reward of up to US$5 million for information leading to his arrest and/or conviction.

Costilla Sánchez has several aliases, including but not limited to: Cos, El Coss, Costi, El Judas, George XX, and Sombra.

=== Kingpin Act sanction ===
On 20 July 2009, the United States Department of the Treasury sanctioned Costilla Sánchez under the Foreign Narcotics Kingpin Designation Act (sometimes referred to simply as the "Kingpin Act"), for his involvement in drug trafficking along with three other international criminals. The act prohibited U.S. citizens and companies from doing any kind of business activity with him, and virtually froze all his assets in the U.S.

== See also ==
- List of Mexico's 37 most-wanted drug lords
- Mérida Initiative
- Mexican drug war
- War on drugs

== Bibliography ==
- Grayson, George (2012). The Executioner's Men: Los Zetas, Rogue Soldiers, Criminal Entrepreneurs, and the Shadow State They Created. Transaction Publishers. ISBN 9781412846172.
