= Federal Judicial Police =

Former federal police force of Mexico

The Federal Judicial Police (Spanish: Policía Judicial Federal, the PJF) was the federal police force of Mexico until it was shut down in 2002 due to corruption.

The jurisdiction of the Federal Judicial Police encompassed the entire nation and was divided into thirteen zones with fifty-two smaller detachment headquarters. Under the coordination of the local federal prosecutor, each zone was headed by a Second Commandant of the Federal Judicial Police, who in turn directs the group chiefs in the outlying detachments. Individuals arrested by the Federal Judicial Police were placed at the disposition of the local federal prosecutor, who appointed subordinate attorneys to assess each case.

One of the smaller law enforcement agencies in Mexico, the Federal Judicial Police grew from 500 personnel in 1982 to over 1,500 in 1984. In 1988 an assistant attorney general's office for investigating and combating drug trafficking was formed with an additional 1,500 Federal Judicial Police agents. In 1990 the office was expanded and given interagency coordinating functions in the battle against narcotics.

Beginning in 2002, the Federal Judicial Police was replaced by the Mexican Federal Investigative Agency due to corruption problems. Between December 1994 and August 1996, 1,250 members, or 22% of the force, were arrested for connections to drug cartels. During the 1980s it was also reported that top officials and police commanders had alliances with the Guadalajara Cartel.

== Human rights abuses ==
During the war in Chiapas, PJF agents were accused by Zapatista prisoners of carrying out torture in federal prisons.

== See also ==
- Scotland Yard
- Royal Canadian Mounted Police (1868)
- United States Federal Bureau of Investigation (1908)
- People's Armed Police of China (1982)
