= Zeferino Peña Cuéllar =

Mexican drug lord (died 2025)

- Born: Zeferino Peña Cuéllar; Tamaulipas, Mexico
- Died: 23 December 2025; Santiago, Nuevo León, Mexico
- Cause of death: Gunshot wounds
- Other names: Don Zefe
- Education: Civil engineering
- Employers: Miguel Alemán Municipal Police (former member); Gulf Cartel (suspected)
- Criminal charges: Homicide; Drug trafficking
- Spouse: Cynthia Torres García (wife)
- Parent: Israel Peña Barrera (father)

Zeferino Peña Cuéllar (died 23 December 2025), also known as Don Zefe, was a Mexican suspected drug lord and high-ranking member of the Gulf Cartel, a criminal group based in the state of Tamaulipas. He was part of the cartel during the 1990s and was a trusted enforcer of former kingpins Gilberto García Mena and Osiel Cárdenas Guillén. From 1999 to 2001, he served as the municipal police chief of Miguel Alemán. Peña Cuéllar reportedly relied on corrupt Mexican military officials to run drug trafficking activities in Tamaulipas. This group of military officers would later become the foundation for the creation of Los Zetas, the Gulf Cartel's former paramilitary group originally made up of ex-soldiers. In the cartel, he headed organized crime operations in the municipalities of Gustavo Díaz Ordaz, Camargo, Miguel Alemán, Mier, and Guerrero.

After García Mena was arrested in April 2001, several within the cartel blamed Peña Cuéllar for informing Mexican authorities of his whereabouts. This triggered an attempt on his life in October 2001 at one of his estates in Nuevo León. Though Peña Cuéllar was not there when the attack occurred, the incident raised his profile in law enforcement circles. Authorities effectively moved against many of his assets in subsequent investigations. Few details of his criminal activities are known; Peña Cuéllar remained active for a few years after the attack, but when several of his accomplices were arrested and/or killed, he disappeared from public view. Peña Cuéllar withdrew from organized crime for an extended period, fleeing Mexico and living in Canada and the United States with the fortune he accumulated during his criminal career. He later re-emerged from retirement and was located and killed by authorities during a shootout in Santiago, Nuevo León, in 2025.

== Early life ==
Peña Cuéllar was born in Tamaulipas, Mexico. He grew up in a large family with numerous siblings. He graduated from college with a degree in civil engineering. From 1999 to 2001, he served as the police chief of the Miguel Alemán Municipal Police force during the administration of the city's mayor, Raúl Rodríguez Barrera ("El Chupón"). Peña Cuéllar's father Israel Peña Barrera also worked for the local police from 1996 to 1998. (Note: His father died on 22 July 2012; Peña Cuéllar and the rest of his siblings, including: Blanca Isela, Israel Francisco, Ricardo, Alma Delia, Martín, Juan de Jesús, Teresita de Jesús, and María Idolina, presented a motion to a judge on 1 August 2018 to enable them inherit all of his assets.) Police reports state that Peña Cuéllar met Rodríguez Barrera before he became mayor. The two had become close friends working together on the police force. Peña Cuéllar was assigned the job of local police chief when Rodríguez Barrera became mayor. Peña Cuéllar was reportedly an informant for the Federal Judicial Police (PJF) in Tamaulipas when Rodríguez Barrera was working there. Their friendship grew once Rodríguez Barrera became mayor, and both were often seen together at public events.

Location of Tamaulipas, where Peña Cuéllar was born and operated from, within Mexico

Besides his police duties, Mexican authorities suspected that Peña Cuéllar also worked with the Gulf Cartel, a criminal group based in Tamaulipas. He reportedly worked alongside organized crime kingpin Gilberto García Mena ("El June") and his lead smuggler Edelio López Falcón ("El Yeyo"). They were responsible for heading drug trafficking operations from Tamaulipas to the United States. Peña Cuéllar also worked with the trafficker Fidel Hinojosa ("El Choco") and with Ricardo Garza Manríquez, the former Miguel Alemán Public Security Department head. Peña Cuéllar was originally García Mena's financial operator, but both eventually became involved in drug trafficking activities together.

In 1997, Peña Cuéllar recruited several military members who were stationed in Miguel Alemán to combat drug-trafficking groups in the region. Among them were Arturo Guzmán Decena and Heriberto Lazcano Lazcano, two military officers who were his bodyguards. They eventually hired other military men using their contact in the police, Aurelio Cano Flores. García Mena's legal team advised both men to hire mercenaries because illegal possession of firearms was considered a more serious crime than drug trafficking at that time. Investigators believe that García Mena's faction was allowed to conduct drug-trafficking activities with relative impunity by the corrupt officers. Peña Cuéllar was reportedly responsible for paying large amounts of cash to corrupt military personnel stationed in Tamaulipas. He collected the money he used to pay them from the U.S. Peña Cuéllar traveled there in a vehicle and smuggled the money back into Mexico in bags disguised and hidden with food supplies, with Lazcano Lazcano and Guzmán Decena providing armed protection. The military men he relied on would become founding members of Los Zetas, the Gulf Cartel's former paramilitary group that was originally composed of ex-commandos. Although he lacked military training, Peña Cuéllar is cited as a founding member of Los Zetas.

In April 2001, the Mexican Army carried out a massive manhunt in Guardados de Abajo, Camargo, that resulted in García Mena's arrest. One of Peña Cuéllar's properties was raided during the operation; multiple firearms were seized at his home, and authorities linked him to the Gulf Cartel. Authorities had information that Peña Cuéllar was hiding in a city in Texas when they raided his home in Miguel Alemán.

== Assassination attempt ==
On 30 October 2001, fourteen gunmen dressed in military uniforms stormed an estate in the Hacienda Santa Lucía neighborhood in Monterrey to kill Peña Cuéllar. They arrived at the property at around 5:45 a.m, and surrounded it with two Hummers and two Suburbans. The gunmen then entered the premises using several portable ladders that helped them to reach the estate's rooftop. Other gunmen destroyed the main entrance gate. A shootout broke out between the gunmen and Peña Cuéllar's henchmen. Around twenty of his gunmen were inside the premises when the shootout occurred. After nearly an hour of gunfire, Peña Cuéllar's men surrendered; some were kidnapped and taken forcibly to the assailants' vehicles. The gunmen then left the scene. On a nearby highway, they were intercepted by a police officer who was responding to the sounds of gunfire at the estate. They told the police officer they were part of the military and were carrying out an operation there. The gunmen then fled the scene and possibly headed to El Faisán and El Uro, two nearby neighborhoods. René Montiel Muñiz and Eduardo Luna Estrada, two of Peña Cuéllar's alleged operators, were injured in the attack. Daniel de la Garza Aguilar, a former police officer and chauffeur, was killed. Peña Cuéllar was not at the estate when the attack occurred, but he frequented it and had been there just hours before the attack. (Note: When Peña Cuéllar visited Monterrey, he frequently traveled with a large number of armed bodyguards.)

When police officers arrived at the scene, Carlos Joel Torres Ortiz, a former customs agent and Peña Cuéllar's in-law, said he was the owner of the property. The Public Registry of Property and Commerce showed the property was registered to Alicia Magdalena García Armendariz, his mother-in-law. At the crime scene, investigators recovered several bullet casings from 9 mm, AK-47s, and AR-15 firearms. They also seized four handguns and two ammunition magazines. At a press conference the following day, Nuevo León authorities said the attack was likely part of a settling of scores within an organized crime group. Investigators confirmed Peña Cuéllar was notified that assassins were after him and had been able to leave the property before the attack. A tip that an attack was imminent first reached Cárdenas Guillén, who quickly notified Peña Cuéllar and warned him to protect himself. Peña Cuéllar reportedly left with an entourage of bodyguards. The day after the attack, the PGR arrived at the estate and investigated the property for about 45 minutes along with chemical experts. They did not mention the specifics of their investigation there.

Authorities were mainly interested in the attempt by organized crime members to kill Peña Cuéllar. However, other investigators did not discount the possibility the attack may have been carried out by members of the military—though they said this was unlikely because the assailants fled the scene shortly after the attack. (Note: The Mexican Army rejected this version and stated they do not flee during shootouts and often support the state police in law enforcement efforts.) Investigators said the attack likely stemmed from the arrest of García Mena. Initially, the Gulf Cartel suspected that López Falcón provided authorities with information that led to his arrest. However, the police suspected that the García Mena later discovered that it was Peña Cuéllar and not López Falcón who plotted against him. Another reason suggested by the police was the attack may have been ordered by López Falcón as revenge after he discovered that Peña Cuéllar started the rumor that he was responsible for García Mena's arrest. López Falcón was also a victim of an assassination attempt in May 2001 after he was blamed for García Mena's capture. By framing López Falcón, security forces suspected that Peña Cuéllar wanted to earn a high-ranking position within Cárdenas Guillén's chain of command.

=== Investigation and aftermath ===
==== First year ====
On 1 November 2001, the Mexican Army and agents from the Specialized Unit Against Organized Crime (UEDO) arrived in Miguel Alemán searching for Peña Cuéllar. They believed he was hiding in the area following an assassination attempt against him. During the operation, they also raided several houses owned by other suspected drug traffickers who were reportedly involved in the plot to murder Peña Cuéllar. Authorities dispatched a convoy through several neighborhoods with air support from a helicopter. Residents said they saw several Hummer vehicles in a number of neighborhoods that matched the description investigators had of those seen during the attack. The PGR questioned seven people linked to the estate, including the two survivors, Peña Cuéllar's in-laws, and the estate's interior decorator Jacobo Pedro González Suárez. Luna Estrada and Montiel Muñiz, the two men injured in the attack in Hacienda Santa Lucía, were placed under arrest, while being treated at a hospital in Monterrey. They were accused of illegal possession of firearms, using military-exclusive weapons, and involvement in organized crime. Luna Estrada refused to make a statement about the incident and asked to be moved to another hospital, but his request was denied. Doctors confirmed he was shot in the leg while attempting to flee during the shootout. Montiel Muñiz admitted he was armed and that he defended himself from the aggressors, but he said he could not identify the attackers. Autopsy reports showed that de la Garza Aguilar was shot in the back of the head and in his right hand.

The assassination attempt against Peña Cuéllar brought increased attention on him and his properties. On 3 November, the UEDO raided the Hacienda Santa Lucía estate and another one linked to him in the El Faisán neighborhood in Santiago. Federal investigators and the military arrived at Hacienda Santa Lucía around 12:00 pm. They were there for nearly four hours conducting ballistic studies and appraising assets on the property. Authorities said the estate possibly had a secret tunnel; one witness claimed they overheard people saying during the shootout they could escape through a tunnel on the property. Authorities suspect the tunnel may have been used by Peña Cuéllar during emergency situations. They did not confirm if they were able to find it during the investigations conducted at the scene. An unidentified person drove away from the house using one of Peña Cuéllar's daughter's vehicles. Once the investigation concluded, they cordoned the entrance and left four Nuevo León State Police officers guarding the property. Investigators then moved on to the El Faisán estate. At this property, authorities seized multiple belongings, including a collectable vehicle, pictures linking the two estates, and multiple weapons. The investigation at this property ended at 7:30 pm. UEFO seized the estate and it was cordoned off by the state police. The following day, Peña Cuéllar's defense issued a writ of amparo. (Note: The petition for a writ of amparo is a remedy available to any person whose right to life, liberty and security is violated or threatened with violation by an unlawful act or omission of a public official or employee, or of a private individual or entity.) Both Luna Estrada and Montiel Muñiz were also granted a motion that prevented them from being incommunicado or removed from the hospital.

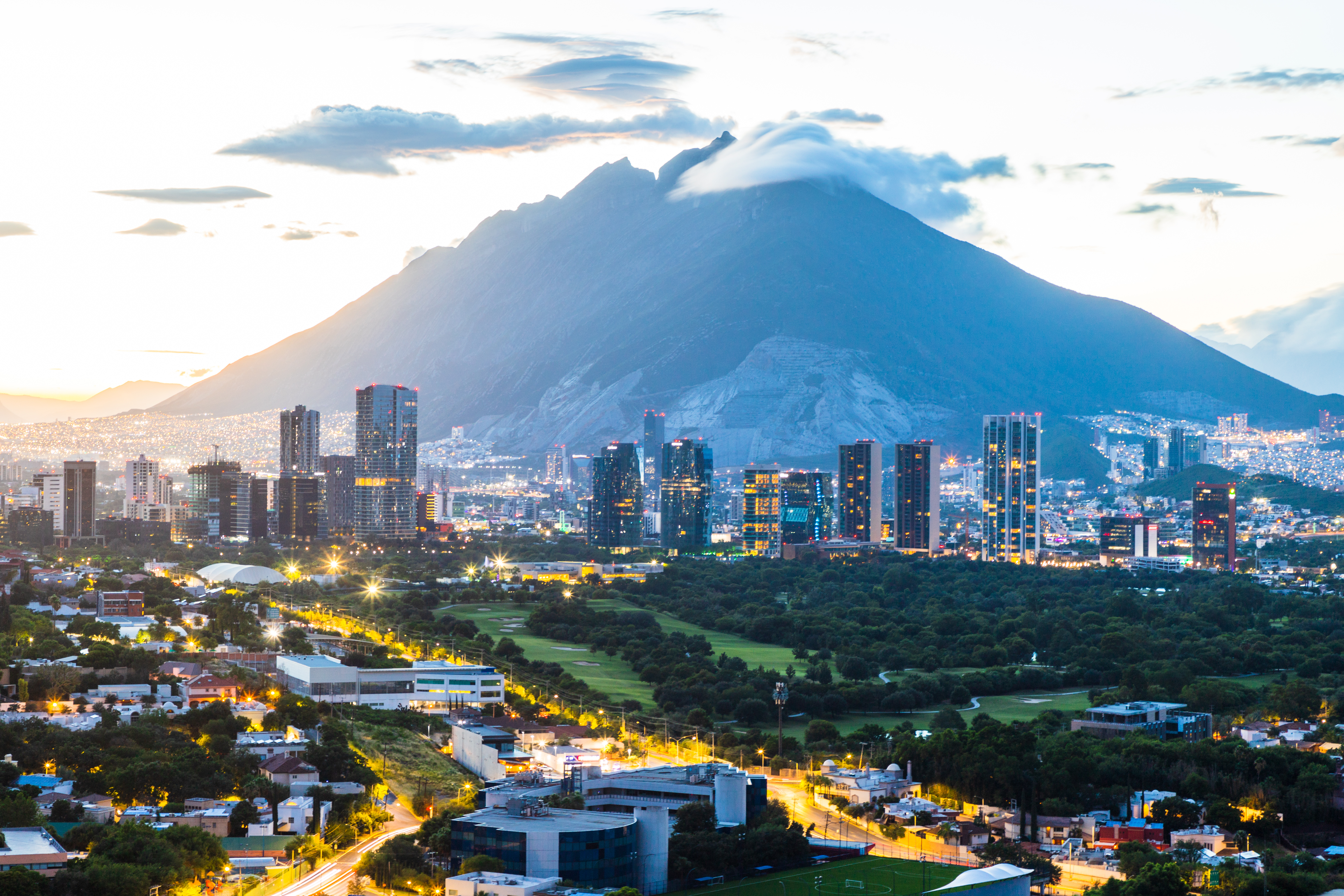
Peña Cuéllar had several properties across the Monterrey metropolitan area, pictured above

On 6 November, the PGR and the UEDO in Nuevo León confirmed they were investigating other properties in southern Monterrey with possible ties to Peña Cuéllar and the suspects involved in the shootout. This investigation was started after federal agents found several documents at the estate confirming the existence of other properties in the area and possible ties to them. The PGR and the UEDO requested information from the PGR's office in Tamaulipas on Peña Cuéllar's profile and the license plates of the vehicles used in the attack. On 8 November, investigators confirmed that Peña Cuéllar had multiple properties in the Monterrey metropolitan area that he used as safe houses for his illegal activities. They confirmed he also had large properties in exclusive neighborhoods in the municipalities of Monterrey, San Pedro Garza García, and San Nicolás de los Garza. They did not rule out the possibility of more properties being under his name in the state of Nuevo León. The police confirmed that other properties were under construction. Authorities said none of the properties were in his name; investigators said Peña Cuéllar did this to avoid detection by the police or rival criminal groups. Although investigators did not confirm if Nuevo León was a major drug trafficking hub, they did accept that houses owned by Peña Cuéllar showed it was likely that important organized crime meetings took place there.

On 9 November, Peña Cuéllar's attorney Américo Delgado de la Peña issued a writ of amparo to prevent authorities from arresting him for his links to the Gulf Cartel. This request guaranteed constitutional protection from the PGR, the UEDO, and the Nuevo León authorities. Federal judge Federico Jorge Martínez Franco granted the motion temporarily, which effectively prevented authorities from these agencies from legally arresting Peña Cuéllar. The only situation where he could be arrested was if he was found in flagrante delicto. A hearing was set for 30 November but was later pushed back to an unspecified date. From the date the writ of amparo was issued until the hearing, the prosecution was asked to gather evidence against Peña Cuéllar. The defense was working to prove Peña Cuéllar was in fact, an agriculture engineer, and did not participate in any homicides or other illegal activities. On 9 November, sixteen members from the UEDO and the Mexican Army raided Garza Aguilar's property in the Residencial Anáhuac neighborhood of San Nicolás de los Garza. This was carried out as part of the investigation into his attempted assassination. Three people were arrested inside the house. (Note: Of the three detainees, two were brothers of Daniel de la Garza Aguilar, an alleged collaborator with Peña Cuéllar who died at the October 2001 shootout. Their names were Rolando and Rodolfo de la Garza Aguilar.) Most of the neighbors refused to speak to the press about who lived in the house; one of them, however, explained that a family lived there. He said he did not know who they were.

On 10 November, Mexican authorities launched an investigation to find the Hummers used in the attack; at that time, Hummers were available only to the Mexican military, not civilians. Authorities found it unusual these vehicles were used in the attack. The police asked civilians to report any sightings of the Hummers. Police advised the press they would carry out multiple raids in the vicinity because they suspected the Hummers were possibly being hidden at one or several estates close to where the attack occurred. On 12 November, the UEDO raided Luna Estrada's house in the Chapultepec neighborhood of Reynosa as part of the investigation to locate Peña Cuéllar. On 13 November, an appeals court judge denied Peña Cuéllar's request to have his El Faisán estate returned to him following a petition by his defense team. Three days later, five of Peña Cuéllar's siblings, Ricardo, Israel Francisco, Almadelina, Juan Javier, and Martín, issued a writ of amparo to prevent authorities from arresting them. Investigators confirmed that his siblings, though originally from Tamaulipas, had properties across Nuevo León.

On 22 November, the UEDO arrested six suspected criminals from Peña Cuéllar's faction in Miguel Alemán, including one who was responsible for his security services. The operative who led to their arrest was part of the investigation into the plot to murder Peña Cuéllar. In an interview with the press, Nuevo León Attorney General Alida Bonifaz Sánchez said that investigators believed Peña Cuéllar may have fled Mexico following the attack. She did not provide details of the number of houses raided nor the dates when these raids occurred, but stated more raids would follow in an effort to crack down on organized crime activity in the area. On 28 November, eighteen gunmen broke into an estate owned by Raymundo García Solís, a suspected Gulf Cartel member, in Cadereyta. They killed one of the property guards and injured two children. The PGR and the Mexican Army raided the property a few days later. They continued their searches in Monterrey to arrest López Falcón and several of his associates, including Mario Ramírez ("La Gata") and René García Solís ("La Pata de Garra"), Raymundo's sibling. The attack was reportedly carried out on López Falcón's orders because René worked with Peña Cuéllar, but the gunmen mistook Raymundo's estate for René's. On 16 December, the PGR confirmed that Peña Cuéllar's collaborators, Luna Estrada and Montiel Núñez, were linked to the Gulf Cartel. Information they provided led to the arrest of sixteen cartel members in Tamaulipas and Veracruz days before. (Note: The suspects were: Arnulfo Ortiz Hernández; Máximo Moreno Ortiz; Héctor Abel Alfonsín Reyes; Arnulfo Miguel Candelario López; Raúl Arroyo Enríquez; Amador de la Garza Báez; José Antonio Aguilar Cuadros; Jorge Pablo Salinas Cantú; Salvador Verastegui Peña; Antonio Ballesteros Benfield; Artemio Benítez Bazán; Hilario Ríos García; José Ramiro Valadez García; Roberto Rangel Gutiérrez; José Ángel Torres Uzcanga; and Antonio Quintana Gallegos.) The PGR confirmed there was a third detainee linked to Peña Cuéllar, but they did not reveal his identity.

==== Following years ====
On 3 January 2002, federal judge Leopoldo Cerón Tinajero ordered the release of Luna Estrada and Montiel Núñez after concluding the UEDO did not provide enough evidence linking them to organized crime. Both of them were imprisoned at the Federal Social Readaptation Center No. 1 (formerly known as La Palma), a maximum-security prison in the State of Mexico, after they were charged with illegal possession of firearms. Since this crime was not considered serious in nature, they paid MXN$10,000 for their early release. Peña Cuéllar's lawyer said both men worked at his client's estate but were not involved in illegal activities. On 13 January, Peña Cuéllar's defense issued another writ of amparo against the PGR and Nuevo León authorities to prevent them from arresting him. Several of his family members also submitted similar motions. The PGR confirmed they had no open arrest warrant against Peña Cuéllar. His five children, as well as his in-laws Ortiz Torres and García Armendariz, and his cousin Sandra Edith Cuéllar López and her husband Martín Gerardo Cortés Barrera, were waiting for confirmation of their legal status.

On 28 February, the PGR gave Peña Cuéllar's Hacienda Santa Lucía estate to the Secretariat of Finance and Public Credit (SHCP). This included the land, building, and all assets within the property. This motion was granted after the PGR had exhausted all their investigative efforts at the property following the attack that had occurred there the year before. The PGR confirmed, however, that Peña Cuéllar was wanted for four homicides, and he had a pending arrest warrant for drug trafficking. On 1 March 2002, the PGR gave the El Faisán's estate to the SHCP, effectively making it a federally-seized property. Peña Cuéllar issued a writ of amparo to prevent this motion, but the request was not granted. The Nuevo León State Police officers who were guarding the property were removed.

Peña Cuéllar's defense was able to reverse the expropriation on 25 April after they appealed the decision through a writ of amparo. An appeals court approved the defense's motion because it concluded the PGR did not fully prove that the property was purchased with illegal funds or tied to drug trafficking activities. In addition, the defense stated that although the PGR had seized El Faisán, they did not have the appropriate paperwork to officially seize the house. The judge handling the case agreed with the defense. The PGR reviewed the writ of amparo on 19 May and stated they could not return the property to him because it was being investigated as a money laundering asset he had purchased. Peña Cuéllar's defense tried to argue that the PGR gave the property to the SHCP prematurely because the investigation had not concluded.

On 12 June 2003, Peña Cuéllar's defense submitted several documents to a court in Monterrey in an effort to have El Faisán's estate returned. The property was under Peña Cuéllar's mother-in-law's name, but the defense had trouble recovering it because the property's previous owner was Carlos Reséndez Bertolucci, a former senior member of the Gulf Cartel. (Note: The property was owned by Reséndez Bertolucci until 1995. It was sold for approximately US$200,000.) Property documents showed Reséndez Bertolucci sold the property to Peña Cuéllar; investigators believe he bought it using drug proceeds. The defense tried to show that Peña Cuéllar bought the property through legal means.

On 13 May 2005, Peña Cuéllar's legal team issued a writ of amparo in Monterrey to prevent an arrest warrant against him issued by a court in Reynosa from taking effect. The writ of amparo also extended to other courts that may have active investigations against him, including those in Nuevo León or under the jurisdiction of the Mexican Army and the PGR. The court in Reynosa responded to the request and confirmed that Peña Cuéllar was being actively investigated for illegal activities. A hearing was confirmed for 27 May, where it would be decided by a court if Peña Cuéllar's motion would be accepted. Federal authorities were also asked to submit their responses regarding any pending investigations against him.

== Criminal activity ==
In the late 1990s, García Mena met and befriended Osiel Cárdenas Guillén, a rising drug trafficker and policeman. Cárdenas Guillén eventually became the top leader of the Gulf Cartel. He appointed Peña Cuéllar and García Mena as regional leaders of drug corridors in La Frontera Chica, a border stretch in Tamaulipas. Peña Cuéllar was assigned as the leader of the Gulf Cartel in the municipalities of Gustavo Díaz Ordaz, Camargo, Miguel Alemán, Mier, and Guerrero. People knew few details of his involvement within the Gulf Cartel, but they regarded him as a skilled leader and negotiator, specifically with rival cartels. He also commanded a squadron of assassins under Cárdenas Guillén.

Peña Cuéllar was wanted by the Attorney General's Office (PGR) for his alleged involvement in the Gulf Cartel. However, in Miguel Alemán, several residents referred to him as a noble resident and school sponsor and did not share the views authorities had of his involvement with organized crime. Peña Cuéllar was known for sponsoring school graduation ceremonies in the city. On 27 June 2001, a newspaper in Reynosa published an article about him attending a school graduation ceremony he reportedly sponsored for a kindergarten. At the ceremony, Peña Cuéllar gave each student a ring and a backpack. The school was owned by Manuelita Barrera de Peña. Peña Cuéllar appeared in five of the ten photographs taken during the event and was referred to as a local engineer. The mayor, Rodríguez Barrera, was also at the event, and several pictures were taken of him next to Peña Cuéllar.

According to Mexican federal authorities, Peña Cuéllar is a suspect in five murders that took place between 1999 and 2000 in Tamaulipas and Nuevo León. Investigators stated that Peña Cuéllar murdered these individuals because they worked against his interests or because of disputes over drug or money settlements. On 22 April 1999, Gerardo Sepúlveda Garza ("El Tucán") was killed by gunmen in Miguel Alemán. On 11 July 2000, Honorato Cano Sánchez was found dead in Los Ramones after reportedly being killed in Tamaulipas. His murder was apparently carried out because of a cocaine debt he owed Peña Cuéllar. Cano Sánchez's body was left in Los Ramones to confuse authorities as to where he was from. After his death, Armando Meléndez Sánchez was killed. He was a political opponent of Rodríguez Barrera (a close associate of Peña Cuéllar) during his run for office. Two police chiefs who confronted Peña Cuéllar were also murdered: Jaime Rajid Gutiérrez Arreola and Pablo Gaytán Mejía. The former was a commander in the PJF; the latter was the Miguel Alemán rural police chief. Investigators were able to tie these crimes to Peña Cuéllar after several suspects were arrested and confessed to his involvement as the mastermind.

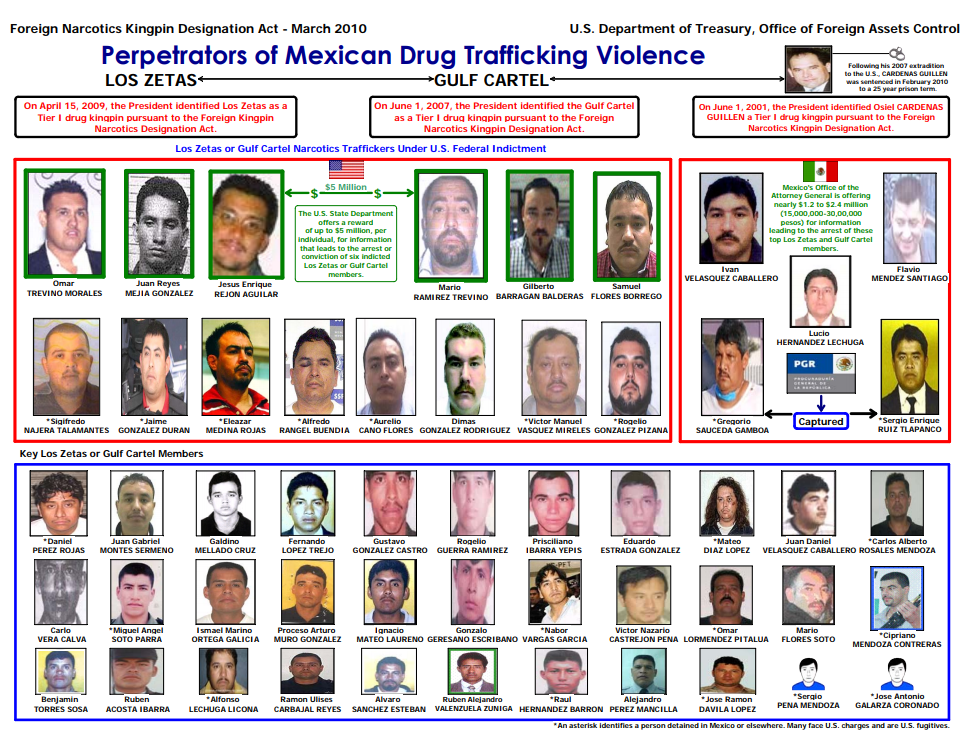
Leadership chart of the Gulf Cartel and Los Zetas issued by the U.S. Department of the Treasury in 2010. Peña Cuéllar is not pictured here but several of his former associates are.

On 18 January 2002, journalist Félix Alonso Fernández García was murdered by unknown assailants in Miguel Alemán. According to investigators, Fernández had accused Rodríguez Barrera of supporting García Mena and other Gulf Cartel traffickers based in La Frontera Chica, and reported these allegations to the police. A few days before his murder, Fernández accused Rodríguez Barrera of plotting to kill him. The journalist's bodyguards confirmed to police that Fernández had hired them after receiving death threats from the mayor. When he was killed, a friend of Fernández stated that Rodríguez Barrera, Peña Cuéllar and his brother Rodolfo, were behind his death. He said that Peña Cuéllar and his brother had also threatened other journalists in the area because they were reporting on their drug trafficking operations. The perpetrators of the killing were never arrested, but investigators discovered cocaine in Fernández's vehicle (suggesting that he may have been involved in drug trafficking).

In 2003, Cárdenas Guillén was arrested in Matamoros. Authorities suspected Peña Cuéllar was one of his potential successors. During the 2000s, investigators believed Peña Cuéllar worked under Jorge Eduardo Costilla Sánchez, a senior member of the Gulf Cartel. Peña Cuéllar's colleagues were: Héctor Manuel Sauceda Gamboa, Gregorio Sauceda Gamboa, Carlos Landín Martínez ("El Puma"), and Alfonso Lam Liu ("Gordo Lam"). In 2005, (Note: The video was sent first to Mexican federal authorities in June 2005. It was leaked to the press in mid-October 2005, when it reached the offices of the Bremerton-based Kitsap Sun newspaper. They did not release the video to the public, and instead forward it to The Dallas Morning News (The News) because one of the men in the video mentioned a murdered journalist, Dolores Guadalupe García Escamilla, an incident The News had reported on. The News released the video to the press in November 2005. It was reportedly filmed on 16 May 2005.) a six-minute interrogation video was leaked to press depicting four alleged gang members from Los Zetas answering questions from an unseen interrogator. (Note: The suspected gang members were: Fernando Cruz Martínez, Sergio Alberto Ramón Escamilla, José Antonio Ramírez Pacheco, and Juan Miguel Vizcarra Cruz.) In the video, the gang members describe the inner workings of the criminal group, their collaboration with corrupt Mexican officials, and Peña Cuéllar's role in a murder. One of the men says Peña Cuéllar gave Los Zetas the order to kill the Nuevo Laredo police chief Alejandro Domínguez Coello because he was disrupting the cartel's operations in the area. At the end of the video, one of the gang members is killed. Authorities from the U.S. and Mexico said the video appeared to be genuine, but expressed their doubts as to the authenticity of the claims made on it, and who was responsible for filming and releasing it to the press.

== Past suspicions of possible whereabouts ==
As a result of his years involved in organized crime, Peña Cuéllar reportedly amassed a fortune from drug profits. He bought multiple properties, including a cattle ranch in Miguel Aléman known as El Carrusel. He defended criminal accusations made against him on numerous occasions, maintaining he was a legitimate cattle rancher. In Miguel Alemán, several residents regarded Peña Cuéllar as a businessman, cattle rancher and merchant and claimed they were unaware of his illicit activities.

After Cárdenas Guillén was extradited to the U.S. from Mexico in 2007, Peña Cuéllar remained a relevant figure within the cartel. However, unlike the rest of his accomplices, who were eventually arrested and/or killed during their manhunts, Peña Cuéllar disappeared from public view over the years and reportedly went into hiding outside Mexico. In Mexico, he was wanted for drug trafficking and homicide and remains a fugitive. According to several accounts within organized crime circles, Peña Cuéllar retired from the Gulf Cartel with the fortune he made during his tenure and was initially believed to have gone into hiding in either Brazil, Canada, or Cuba. (Note: One account, citing an informant from Los Zetas, says that Peña Cuéllar became a religious man and decided to pursue the priesthood in Cuba. The source says that Peña Cuéllar was part of a "weird religion".) In 2018, Peña Cuéllar and his siblings signed an edict to inherit assets owned by their father. He signed using "Ceferino" instead of "Zeferino". A government official asked Peña Cuéllar to appear in court in fifteen days. In 2019, it was discovered that he was living in Canada and South Texas with his wife, Cynthia Torres García, and their three children, and that he frequently traveled to Mexico, where he intended to emerge from retirement to resume organized crime.

== Death ==
Peña Cuéllar was killed during a shootout with officers from the State Investigation Agency in Santiago, Nuevo León, in the early afternoon of 23 December 2025. At approximately 1:30 pm. CST, authorities were alerted to Peña Cuéllar's whereabouts at a suburban estate in the Los Rodríguez neighborhood, near the intersection of Las Torres and Benito Juárez streets, following reports of armed individuals at the location. Security forces moved to the site, where they encountered heavy gunfire from inside the residence. During the ensuing shootout, two people were killed, including Peña Cuéllar and his companion, David Calderón, a former military officer. One Nuevo León State investigation agent was wounded and later reported to be in stable condition at a nearby hospital. A man and a woman were also arrested, and several weapons and narcotics were seized. Investigators stated that Peña Cuéllar was in Nuevo León with the intention of founding a new criminal group, possibly operating as an independent drug trafficker.

== See also ==
- Mexican drug war

== Bibliography ==
- Brook, John Lee (2016). Blood+death: The Secret History of Santa Muerte and the Mexican Drug Cartels. SCB Distributors. ISBN 978-1909394223.
- Cedillo, Juan Alberto (2018). Las guerras ocultas del narco (in Spanish). Penguin Random House. ISBN 978-6073171038.
- Fazio, Carlos (2016). Estado de emergencia: De la guerra de Calderón a la guerra de Peña Nieto (in Spanish). Penguin Random House. ISBN 978-6073140133.
- Gutiérrez, Alejandro (2007). Narcotráfico: el gran desafío de Calderón (in Spanish). Editorial Planeta Mexicana. ISBN 978-9703703180.
- Osorno, Diego Enrique (2012). La guerra de Los Zetas (in Spanish). Penguin Random House. ISBN 978-6073110488.
- Osorno, Diego Enrique (2011). El cártel de Sinaloa (in Spanish). Penguin Random House. ISBN 978-6073102346.
- Ravelo, Ricardo (2012). Osiel: Vida y tragedia de un capo (in Spanish). Penguin Random House. ISBN 978-6073107716.
