= Alfonso Lam Liu =

Mexican drug lord

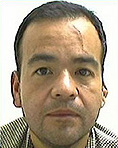
- Born: 1969 or 1970 (age 56–57); Torreón, Coahuila, Mexico
- Other name: Gordo Lam
- Education: Monterrey Institute of Technology and Higher Education (dropped out)
- Occupation: Drug lord
- Employer: Gulf Cartel
- Height: 1.72 m (5.6 ft)
- Criminal charges: Murder; Drug trafficking
- Criminal status: Convicted
- Spouse: Aurora Canales Melhem
- Children: 3

Notes
- Imprisoned at the Federal Correctional Institution in Big Spring, Texas

Alfonso Lam Liu (born 1969/1970), also known as Gordo Lam ("Fatty Lam"), is a Mexican convicted drug lord and former high-ranking member of the Gulf Cartel, a criminal group based in Tamaulipas, Mexico. Lam Liu was part of the cartel during the early 2000s and worked as the regional leader of Río Bravo under the directorship of Jorge Eduardo Costilla Sánchez and Osiel Cárdenas Guillén. As head of organized crime activities in Río Bravo, Lam Liu was responsible for coordinating international cocaine and marijuana trafficking shipments to the U.S. and of smuggling drug proceeds back into Mexico. During his tenure, Lam Liu worked closely with local government officials, who helped facilitate the Gulf Cartel's operations in exchange for bribery payments.

In 2007, Lam Liu was indicted by the United States District Court for the District of Columbia for international drug trafficking along with other high-ranking members of the Gulf Cartel and its former paramilitary group Los Zetas. In 2009, when returning from a trip to Las Vegas, he was arrested by agents of the Drug Enforcement Administration (DEA). He was convicted and imprisoned at the Federal Correctional Institution in Big Spring, Texas. In 2017, the Office of the Pardon Attorney announced that Lam Liu's commutation request was denied. His expected release date is 24 February 2026.

== Early life ==
Alfonso Lam Liu, who is known by his nickname Gordo Lam ("Fatty Lam"), was born in Torreón, Coahuila, Mexico. Since he was a child, Lam Liu has had a tendency for obesity and was thus nicknamed for it. He was 1.73 m (5.7 ft) tall and physically stocky. Lam Liu's father was of Lebanese descent and his mother was of Chinese descent. His family worked in the cotton industry and owned several restaurants in the area. They were part of a group of wealthy Lebanese Mexicans based in Coahuila. Lam Liu was enrolled in the top schools of the area; he attended grade school at the Instituto Francés de la Laguna in neighboring municipality of Gómez Palacio, Durango. For high school, he attended Carlos Pereyra School, a Society of Jesus school in Torreón. Upon graduation, he attended the Monterrey Institute of Technology and Higher Education in Torreón to study business administration but he did not finish his studies.

== Career ==
According to security forces, Lam Liu joined organized crime through Jaime Guerrero González, the father-in-law of the former Coahuila Governor Humberto Moreira. Guerrero worked closely with Osiel Cárdenas Guillén, the leader of the Gulf Cartel, organizing events in Piedras Negras for him. Lam Liu later met Cárdenas Guillén and joined the Gulf Cartel. The police stated that Lam Liu had an inclination for violence but preferred to keep a low profile. According to the U.S. Drug Enforcement Administration (DEA), Lam Liu coordinated attacks against Mexican government officials who worked against the interests of the Gulf Cartel by using U.S.-born assassins as foot soldiers. Lam Liu was a high-ranking member of the Gulf Cartel faction headed by the kingpin Jorge Eduardo Costilla Sánchez; his colleagues were the siblings Gregorio and Héctor Manuel Sauceda Gamboa, Zeferino Peña Cuéllar ("Don Zefe"), and Carlos Landín Martínez ("El Puma").

Lam Liu was the regional leader of the Gulf Cartel in Río Bravo, Tamaulipas. He was responsible for international drug trafficking activities between Tamaulipas and the U.S. Lam Liu reportedly had ties with several local politicians who helped the Gulf Cartel operate freely in the area in exchange for bribery payments. From 2002 to 2004, Lam Liu reportedly had a partnership with the Río Bravo mayor Juan Antonio Guajardo Anzaldúa, who became the first mayor of the city to work closely with organized crime groups. Through his cousin Rolando Aguilar Anzaldúa, the mayor received the payments from the Gulf Cartel and intimidated rival politicians. The Gulf Cartel's paramilitary group Los Zetas was not part of the agreement with the local government because they refused to pay the fee imposed by government officials, resulting in tensions between Lam Liu, Los Zetas leader Heriberto Lazcano Lazcano, and Guajardo Anzaldúa. When Guajardo Anzaldúa's mayoralty ended, he ran for congress and continued to receive payments from Lam Liu. He ran for mayor again in 2007 but lost the election. Upon his defeat, he asked the federal government to increase the Mexican Army's presence in Río Bravo, which elevated tensions in organized crime circles. In November 2007, Guajardo Anzaldúa was murdered by gunmen. Days prior to his murder, Guajardo Anzaldúa told reporters the Gulf Cartel financed political campaigns; he showed pictures of organized crime members with Tamaulipas state officials.

According to the Deputy Attorney General's Office for Special Investigation into Organized Crime (SIEDO), along with other cartel members, Lam Liu may have been responsible for organizing the murder of Guajardo Anzaldúa. Investigators also believe Lazcano Lazcano may have ordered the attack. Guajardo Anzaldúa also had disagreements with politician Miguel Ángel Almaraz Maldonado, who headed an illegal Pemex oil theft ring in Tamaulipas with Lam Liu and the cartel. In addition to Guajardo Anzaldúa, Lam Liu was close to Juan de Dios Cavazos Cárdenas, who also served as the Río Bravo mayor; they were often seen together at public boxing events. According to investigators, Cavazos Cárdenas appointed several family members of Los Zetas to government posts. The partnership between Lam Liu and Cavazos Cárdenas extended into their personal lives; Cavazos Cárdenas' son-in-law's sister was married to Lam Liu (her surnames were Canales Melhem). Lam Liu was an investor in their family's businesses, which included a transportation company known as Transportes Trancasa. In politics, Lam Liu supported his cousin Edgardo Melhem Salinas, who was head of the Secretariat of Social Development (SEDESOL) agency in Tamaulipas.

=== Criminal charges ===
On 15 November 2007, Lam Liu was indicted by the United States District Court for the District of Columbia (D.D.C.) along with several other members of the Gulf Cartel and Los Zetas for his involvement in drug trafficking. The indictment was initially sealed in court by U.S. officials and was opened in court on 2 September 2008. As a result of the offenses, Lam Liu was ordered to forfeit the drug profits made from this scheme. Lam Liu was charged again in a superseding indictment by the D.D.C. on 15 May 2009 and was identified as the regional leader of the Gulf Cartel in Río Bravo. According to this indictment, in or around 2006, Lam Liu supervised cocaine and marijuana smuggling activities from Mexico, Guatemala, Panama, Colombia, and elsewhere to the U.S. Both incidents included drug charges of importing at least 5 kg (11 lb) of cocaine and at least 1,000 kg (2,200 lb) of marijuana. U.S. authorities stated that the drugs imported by Lam Liu were smuggled in motor vehicles from Mexico to the U.S.

In addition, the second indictment stated that Lam Liu carried out violent attacks against Mexican security forces and rival gangsters that interfered with their operations, and that he used push-to-talk devices and UHF/VHF radio communications equipment with coded conversations to coordinate with other smugglers and avoid detection by law enforcement personnel. Lam Liu's record-keeping activities were stored on flashdrives and laptops, and included information on other regional leaders, drug shipments and locations, payrolls to gang members and corrupt government officials, and the cartel's accounts receivable and accounts payable. In addition to the drug charges, Lam Liu was also charged with smuggling currency from the drug profits from the U.S. to Mexico.

In the second indictment, U.S. authorities provided more details of Lam Liu's drug trafficking activities; it said he met with Lazcano Lazcano in January 2007 to discuss a 100 kg (220 lb) cocaine deal. In the agreement, Lazcano gave Lam Liu the drugs and agreed to let him sell it in Houston, Texas once it reached the U.S., and allowed him to keep half of the profits. Lazcano contacted his associate Daniel Pérez Rojas ("El Cachetes"), who coordinated the delivery to Lam Liu with Víctor Hugo López Valdez. (Note: Víctor Hugo López Valdez is also known as Jorge Hernández Martínez and by his aliases "Chiri" and Chiriquas".) Lazcano's associates confirmed there was surplus cocaine stored in a warehouse in Valle Hermoso, Tamaulipas and delivered it to Lam Liu. In a wiretapped conversation mentioned in the second indictment, on 9 March 2007, Lam Liu spoke with the organized crime kingpin Jaime González Durán about a 400 kg (880 lb) shipment of marijuana Lam Liu received from suppliers in Río Bravo. Lam Liu stated that the supplier would not be taxed for moving drugs through his turf because he was a good friend of his and that some of the drugs would be sent to González Durán's turf. The indictment stated that González Durán agreed to Lam Liu's request not to tax his supplier.

== Manhunt and arrest ==
In January 2008, Lam Liu was nearly captured by Mexican authorities following a raid at a home in Altamira, where a shootout between organized crime members and law enforcement officers broke out. Authorities confiscated several firearms, ammunition, bullet-proof vests and vehicles. The police stated that Lam Liu may have been hiding there prior to the arrival of law enforcement personnel. In a simultaneous operation, authorities also raided a house in Ciudad Mier and seized multiple vehicles, ammunition, and drugs linked to Lam Liu. The Attorney General's Office (PGR) found several documents that linked Lam Liu to the Gulf Cartel; he was a suspect in several murders of security forces and politicians in Tamaulipas and in other parts of Mexico.

The Mexican Army extended its manhunt for Lam Liu and people aligned to his faction across multiple cities in Tamaulipas, including Río Bravo, Reynosa, Miguel Alemán, Nuevo Laredo and Matamoros. Law enforcement officials had information that Lam Liu was hiding in the state. In 2009, the DEA arrested him after returning from a trip to Las Vegas, Nevada. At the moment of his arrest, Lam Liu was accompanied by a woman from Río Bravo. Lam Liu was convicted in a U.S. court and was imprisoned at the Federal Correctional Institution in Big Spring, Texas. On 18 January 2017, the Office of the Pardon Attorney announced that Lam Liu's request for commutation was denied by U.S. President Barack Obama. Lam Liu's expected release date is 24 February 2026.

== See also ==
- Mexican drug war
