= La Generala =

La Generala may refer to:

- Maria Teresinha Gomes, Portuguese military general
- María Antonieta Rodríguez Mata, Mexican police officer and drug lord
