= María Antonieta Rodríguez Mata =

Mexican drug lord

- Born: 21 June 1969 (age 57); Tampico, Tamaulipas, Mexico
- Other names: La Tony; La Generala
- Education: Universidad Valle de Bravo, Campus Reynosa
- Occupations: Police officer; Drug lord
- Employers: Tamaulipas State Police (1992 - 1999); Gulf Cartel
- Criminal charges: Drug trafficking; Money laundering
- Criminal penalty: 102 months (8.5 years)
- Criminal status: Convicted
- Parents: Antonio Rodriguez Zacarias (father); Rosalia Mata Espinoza (mother)

María Antonieta Rodríguez Mata (born 21 June 1969) is a Mexican former police officer and convicted drug lord. She worked as a Tamaulipas State Police officer from 1992 to 1996. During her tenure in the police, she was subject to several investigations by the National Human Rights Commission for alleged human rights violations. In the late 1990s, she became involved with the Gulf Cartel, a criminal group based in Tamaulipas, Mexico, after being hired to work under the kingpin Osiel Cárdenas Guillén. She was responsible for coordinating drug trafficking shipments from Colombia, Guatemala, and Mexico to the U.S. The drugs were often guarded by corrupt policemen and smuggled overland through Reynosa and McAllen, Texas. Her role in organized crime is unusual since she held a leadership role in the male-dominated Mexican drug trafficking industry.

In February 2004, Rodríguez Mata was arrested in Monterrey under a formal petition from the U.S. for her extradition. Although she took legal steps to prevent her transfer to the U.S., she was extradited in August 2007 to face 10 counts of drug trafficking in the U.S. District Court for the Southern District of Texas. She pleaded guilty to two counts of drug trafficking and was sentenced to 102 months (eight and a half years) in prison in October 2008. Since she had already spent time in Mexican and U.S. custody prior to her conviction, her expected release date was much sooner. She faced no criminal charges in Mexico.

== Early life and personality ==
María Antonieta Rodríguez Mata was born on 21 June 1969 in Tampico, Tamaulipas, Mexico, to Antonio Rodriguez Zacarias and Rosalia Mata Espinoza. An alternate date of birth, 1 January 1969, is listed in her criminal profile. When she was age one her family moved to Reynosa, where she grew up and studied until middle school. She moved to Saltillo, Coahuila, for high school and returned to Reynosa to study law at the Universidad Valle de Bravo. She suspended her studies temporarily when she was 22-years old to pursue a career in the Tamaulipas State Police. She was admitted into the agency in 1992. She dropped out of college altogether in 1994 but returned to finish her studies in 1996.

Rodríguez Mata is the youngest of six siblings. Although her relationship with her mother was strong and dependent, she was much closer to her father, a local Pemex laborer. Rodríguez Mata had a Catholic upbringing and stood out from her classmates academically and intellectually. According to her psychological profile, she relies on inductive reasoning. Her intellectual coefficient allows her to have a high capacity for analysis, logical synthesis and emotional control.

Socially, Rodríguez Mata prefers the conventional; she usually takes on the dominant role in group settings. Rodríguez Mata admitted that she does not consume illegal substances. She is open about her homosexuality, her use of cigarettes, and that she seldom drinks in social settings. Rodríguez Mata was 1.65 m (5 ft 5 in) and weighed 75 kg (165 lb)—characteristic of an overweight body type. According to her criminal profile, she was not ostentatious and did not buy expensive items. Though not entirely focused on her vanity, she once underwent surgery to reduce her stomach fat and lose weight. Her psychologist said that her personality was formed in an environment where she received a lot of attention and recognition for her appearance and actions. In later years, she suffered from a degree of grandiosity, need for admiration, and a worry about being successful.

== Career ==
=== Police force ===
In 1995, Mexico's National Human Rights Commission (CNDH) determined that Rodríguez Mata and her state police colleagues Juan Jesús Salinas Cantú, Arturo Maldonado Rodríguez, Juan Carlos Cantú Rodríguez, and Ramiro Aranda Villarreal illegally arrested Miguel Torres Castillo and Mario Alberto Chávez Salinas in Tamaulipas. They were suspended from their police duties for fifteen days. On 27 October 1995, Rodríguez Mata and state police officer Mario Alberto Cárdenas Gutiérrez arrested U.S.-born national Gerardo Ramírez Olvera inside the Fiesta Mexicana nightclub in Reynosa and reportedly transported him illegally in a police car to the U.S., where he had outstanding criminal charges. Rodríguez Mata and Cárdenas Gutiérrez were reportedly accompanied by two U.S. Federal Bureau of Investigation (FBI) agents. Ramírez Olvera was detained illegally by U.S. Customs agents at the McAllen–Hidalgo–Reynosa International Bridge for two hours to fill out his paperwork. At the time of his arrest, Ramírez Olvera was reportedly not shown any official documentation indicating that the Mexican police had the legal authority to arrest him; the CNDH suspects that Reynosa customs agents may have been involved in the scheme as well, and that Rodríguez Mata and Cárdenas Gutiérrez were likely paid by the FBI agents to capture and illegally transport Ramírez Olvera to the U.S. without proper legal authorization. The details of Ramírez Olvera's case were based on information from Juan Gutiérrez González, a friend and eyewitness, and María del Rosario Segura, the victim's wife.

The Tamaulipas State Police chief Juan Guillermo Lerma Walle responded to the accusations and stated that the officers made the arrest because they were notified that a man (Ramírez Olvera) was inside the nightclub with a firearm. Rodríguez Mata and Cárdenas Gutiérrez identified themselves using their police badges and said they were members of the state force. Upon conducting a search, they determined that Ramírez Olvera was not armed. The police stated that Ramírez Olvera acknowledged he was a U.S. citizen; when asked about his legal status in Mexico, he responded by saying that he was in Mexico because he was a fugitive from U.S. justice. The CNDH believes that Ramírez Olvera never made this confession; they find it unreasonable that he would implicate himself. They believe that the police knew who their target was and purposely went into the nightclub to arrest him illegally. Lerma Walle stated that Ramírez Olvera was sent to their station in Reynosa and called U.S. officials to confirm the information. The FBI reportedly confirmed that Ramírez Olvera was wanted on marijuana possession, drug conspiracy and money laundering charges. Ramírez Olvera was placed under the jurisdiction of the National Institute of Migration (INM) and expelled from Mexico.

Tamaulipas attorney general César Ceballos Blanco said that Ramírez Olvera's family made up the story after the Mexican police arrested him for residing in Mexico illegally. He stated that local police chief Edgardo Piedras participated in the arrest along with his personnel and that he was "proud" of his actions. The CNDH said that Piedras' name was not found in the original versions of the story and highlighted this as a contradiction on the police's part. FBI supervisor Rogelio de la Garza also backed up the state police's story by saying that Rodríguez Mata and Cárdenas Gutiérrez acted professionally. He confirmed that Ramírez Olvera had been wanted by U.S. authorities since June 1995 and had a long history of drug trafficking. He stated that if found guilty, Ramírez Olvera faced from 25 years up to life imprisonment for such charges.

De la Garza also said Rodríguez Mata and Cárdenas Gutiérrez were never paid by the FBI and that the story was fabricated deliberately to hinder U.S.–Mexico relations. Tamaulipas officials submitted a response stating that Ramírez Olvera was legally handed over to the INM, and that by handing him over to the INM they were no longer liable for his legal status. However, INM delegate Clarissa Salas Chacón responded by saying that Ramírez Olvera was never present at the INM. She said that an agent from the Tamaulipas State Police did show up early the day after Ramírez Olvera's arrest and was given a sealed envelope with paperwork on illegal aliens in Mexico. The CNDH believes this and other contradictions highlight the culpability of Rodríguez Mata and the state police in the arbitrary arrest and expulsion of Ramírez Olvera.

=== Organized crime ===
When Rodríguez Mata was in the Tamaulipas State Police, she also protected the criminal activities of the Gulf Cartel kingpin Osiel Cárdenas Guillén. She left the state police voluntarily on 1 June 1996. According to investigators, she was brought into the Gulf Cartel by a senior member, Gregorio Sauceda Gamboa ("El Caramuela"), who had also served alongside her in the state police. (Note: The cited source inadvertently mentions that Rodríguez Mata and Gregorio Sauceda Gamboa ("El Caramuela") were part of the Reynosa Municipal Police. However, both were part of the Tamaulipas State Police.) After leaving the police, Rodríguez Mata bought two houses in Reynosa and Monterrey, although she usually spent more of her time at the latter. On 9 November 1999, Rodríguez Mata and several members of the Gulf Cartel were involved in an armed standoff in Matamoros with two U.S. federal agents after they traveled there with an informant to gather intelligence on the cartel's operations. The agents and their informant returned to the U.S. unharmed. The incident triggered a massive manhunt for several of the cartel's leaders. In the cartel, Rodríguez Mata was assigned to manage an international narcotics ring from Colombia and Guatemala to the U.S.-Mexico border with Texas. The drugs she supervised were transported by land and guarded by corrupt members of the Tamaulipas State Police, some of whom she had worked with previously.

Rodríguez Mata worked closely with Zetas member Rogelio González Pizaña ("El Kelín"), who served as her intermediary in Veracruz. Once in Tamaulipas, the drugs were smuggled via the Reynosa corridor and into McAllen, Texas, before being sent to Dallas and Houston for further distribution. The drugs were then redistributed through different locations in the U.S. interior, including to the states of California, Georgia, North Carolina, Illinois and New York. In 2000, the U.S. District Court for the Southern District of Texas (S.D. Tex.) in Brownsville indicted Rodríguez Mata on six counts of drug trafficking, conspiracy and money laundering. Nine other people were mentioned in the indictment; charges against one of them were dismissed. The remaining eight individuals were convicted of their charges. According to the indictment, Rodríguez Mata was responsible for smuggling more than 100 lb (45 kg) of marijuana and more than 160 lb (73 kg) of cocaine between March and December of that year. The U.S. Drug Enforcement Administration (DEA) determined she made around US$200,000 from the proceeds of these shipments. In 2004, the Mexican government estimated that the Gulf Cartel as a whole was responsible for smuggling over five tons of cocaine from Guatemala to Texas.

Rodríguez Mata rose through the ranks of the Gulf Cartel and became a high-ranking member in Reynosa. She served as the Gulf Cartel's link to other criminal groups in the U.S., Mexico, Colombia, Guatemala, and the Dominican Republic. According to her associates, she often met with criminal members at her house in the Las Fuentes neighborhood in Reynosa or traveled to meet business partners in person; she preferred to discuss and strike drug deals in person. At her meetings, she was reportedly accompanied by Mexican law enforcement agents. Outside of her organized crime career, she also ran multiple businesses, including auto repair shops, restaurants, real estate leasing agencies, and a fish farming company. She posed as a legitimate business person with these money laundering fronts. Rodríguez Mata is a particularly unusual figure in organized crime circles, given her involvement in a leadership position in the male-dominated Mexican drug trafficking industry. (Note: According to Autonomous University of Sinaloa professor and investigator Arturo Santamaría, northern Mexico, the area where Rodríguez Mata grew up, is less traditional. Women tend to be more independent than in the south, where male-dominated preferences are stronger.) In the cartel she had several aliases: La Tony, La Generala (The General), La Comandante (The Commander), La Vieja (The Old Woman), La Tia (The Aunt) and La Mandy.

== Arrest and imprisonment ==
On 7 February 2004, the Federal Investigative Agency (AFI) arrested Rodríguez Mata in Monterrey, Nuevo León. The arrest was conducted in response to a U.S. extradition request; Mexico's Attorney General's Office (PGR) confirmed that Rodríguez Mata was indeed a high-ranking member of the Gulf Cartel and that she was wanted in the U.S. for drug trafficking. The arrest was approved in Mexico by the Specialized Unit Against Organized Crime (UEDO, a former branch of the PGR). At the moment of her arrest, Rodríguez Mata was walking with another person who investigators said was not involved in drug trafficking. On 8 February, Rodríguez Mata was transferred from Monterrey to Mexico City and imprisoned at the Reclusorio Preventivo Femenil Norte, a women's prison, and placed under the jurisdiction of a penal judge.

At her initial hearing, she rejected all charges before Mexico City federal judge Arturo César Morales Ramírez, who had approved her arrest warrant in Mexico following the U.S. request. Mexican authorities confirmed that Rodríguez Mata did not have any outstanding charges in Mexico at the time of her arrest. Mexican security forces considered Rodríguez Mata's arrest a significant blow to the Gulf Cartel. It suffered significant setbacks in 2003 and 2004. The government also captured Cárdenas Guillén, Rodríguez Mata's business partner González Pizaña, Víctor Manuel Vázquez Mireles ("El Meme"), Carlos Rosales Mendoza ("El Tísico"), José Alfredo Cárdenas Martínez and Ramiro Hernández García ("El Mati").

Whilst in prison, she was close to Florence Cassez, a convicted French kidnapper. On 7 February 2006, she was released from prison but rearrested by the PGR immediately outside the penitentiary and kept under their custody for 30 days. She was imprisoned a second time in Mexico City and had her extradition proceedings resumed. In September 2006, the Mexican government authorized Rodríguez Mata's extradition to the U.S. However, her defense issued several writs of amparo to prevent her transfer. That year Rodríguez Mata was among a handful of suspected Mexican criminals and drug traffickers awaiting transfer to the U.S. who had issued legal motions to prevent their transfer from Mexico. On 3 August 2007, her writs of amparo were denied by several tribunals.

== Extradition and conviction ==
On 10 August 2007, she was extradited to the U.S. to face drug trafficking and money laundering charges in the S.D. Tex. The extradition was publicly confirmed by the U.S. Embassy in Mexico City. The Secretariat of Public Security (SSP) confirmed that she was flown in a non-commercial plane from the Toluca International Airport to the McAllen-Miller International Airport. U.S. officials were on board; once in the U.S., she was taken into custody by the U.S. Marshals Service. U.S. officials asked the presiding judge to hold Rodríguez Mata without bond. If convicted, she faced up to life imprisonment.

In early 2008, Rodríguez Mata pleaded guilty to two counts of drug trafficking related to shipments from northern Mexico to New York. On 3 October 2008, she was sentenced to 102 months (eight and a half years) in a U.S. federal prison for her leadership role in an international drug trafficking and money laundering organization. Her conviction included three years of mandatory supervision upon her release. Since Rodríguez Mata had already served several years in prison both in Mexican and U.S. custody, she was expected to be released in about four years. Multiple smugglers who worked with her also served convictions in the U.S. ranging from probation to 11 years in prison. Earlier in the year, former Tamaulipas police commander Carlos Landín Martínez was also convicted in the U.S. for his drug trafficking role in the Gulf Cartel; Rodríguez Mata's time in the Tamaulipas State Police overlapped with his. Rodríguez Mata was released from prison on 31 May 2013, after just over four and a half years in custody.

== See also ==
- Mexican drug war

== Bibliography ==
- Astorga Almanza, Luis Alejandro (2007). Seguridad, traficantes y militares: el poder y la sombra (in Spanish). Tusquets Editores. ISBN 978-9706991768. OCLC 181194619.
- CNDH (1996). "Caso del señor Gerardo Ramírez Olvera" (PDF) (in Spanish). Ciudad Victoria, Tamaulipas: National Human Rights Commission. Archived from the original (PDF) on 17 January 2019.
- Volpi Escalante, Jorge (2018). Una novela criminal (in Spanish). Barcelona, Spain: Alfaguara. ISBN 9788420432274.
- Secretaría General del Gobierno (1996). "Periódico oficial". Periódico Oficial del Estado de Tamaulipas (in Spanish). 121 (35–52). OCLC 23088062.
- CNDH de Tamaulipas (1996). "Informe anual". Comisión de Derechos Humanos del Estado de Tamaulipas. Ciudad Victoria, Tamaulipas. OCLC 35095686.
