= El Puma =

El Puma may refer to:

- José Luis Rodríguez (singer), a Venezuelan singer/actor, nicknamed El Puma
- José Luis Rodríguez (footballer, born 1963), Argentine, nicknamed El Puma
- Carlos Landín Martínez, a Mexican convicted drug lord, nicknamed El Puma
