= J.E. "Eddie" Guerra =

American sheriff (born 1962)

Jose Eduardo Guerra

Sheriff of Hidalgo County
- Incumbent
- Assumed office April 3, 2014
- Preceded by: Guadalupe Treviño

Personal details
- Born: July 16, 1962 (age 64) McAllen, Texas, U.S.
- Party: Democratic
- Spouse: Norma Guerra
- Education: Texas A&M University (BAgr)
- Occupation: Sheriff
- Website: http://www.sheriffguerra.com/]

Jose Eduardo "Eddie" Guerra is the Sheriff of Hidalgo County, Texas. On April 2, 2014, the Hidalgo County Commissioners Court appointed Guerra, who was Hidalgo County Precinct 4 Constable at the time, to replace Guadalupe Treviño, who resigned on March 28, 2014, saying both internal and external pressure started building on December 12, 2012, when the Panama Unit scandal broke. On November 4, 2014, Guerra was elected by a majority of voters to the post he had held for seven months and the victory kept him in office until 2016, since former Sheriff Treviño was in the second of a four-year term. In 2016, he was up for re-election to a full term.

On November 8, 2016, Guerra defeated Republican challenger Albert "Al" Perez on with nearly 74 percent of 165,000 ballots cast, according to results published by the Hidalgo County Elections Department. On March 3, 2020, Guerra defeated Frank Guerrero in the Democratic primary election and will face a Republican challenger on the November 2020 general election.

== Early life, education, and career ==
Guerra was born in McAllen and grew up on the D.V. Guerra Ranch, named after his grandfather. He went through Catholic school and graduated from Edinburg High School in 1980. He holds a Bachelor of Science Degree in Agricultural Education from Texas A&M University.

== See also ==
- Hidalgo County Sheriff's Office (Texas)
