= John Closner =

American sheriff (1853–1932)

John Closner (1853–1932) was an early Hidalgo County, Texas developer, rancher, and Democratic Party boss of South Texas. He became Hidalgo County Sheriff in 1890 and under the protection of James B. Wells Jr., became the county's political boss. During his rule he brought peace to the county and was seen as such an effective leader that he was nicknamed the "father" of Hidalgo County.

== Biography ==
=== Early years ===
John Closner was born on March 24, 1853, in New Glarus, Wisconsin the son of Swiss parents John and Elizabeth (Blumer) Closner. He moved to Texas in 1870 and settled in Bosque County, before moving to Rio Grande City, Texas in 1883 with only fifteen dollars.

Closner is credited for pioneering farming and irrigation in Hidalgo County.

Closner died on June 3, 1932, in Brownsville, Texas, the city to which he moved in 1923 with his family to retire. Today, a major boulevard in Edinburg, Texas bears his last name.
