= Randy Crane =

American judge (born 1965)

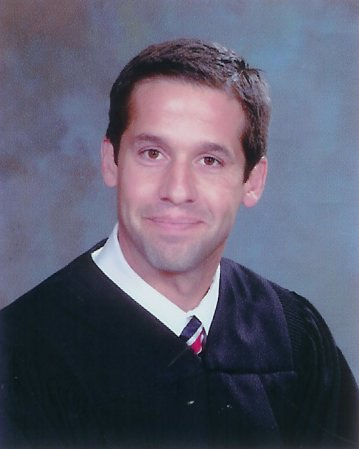

Chief Judge of the United States District Court for the Southern District of Texas
- Incumbent
- Assumed office November 29, 2022
- Preceded by: Lee H. Rosenthal

Judge of the United States District Court for the Southern District of Texas
- Incumbent
- Assumed office April 21, 2002
- Appointed by: George W. Bush
- Preceded by: Seat established

Personal details
- Born: Robert Randall Crane; May 27, 1965 (age 60) Houston, Texas, U.S.
- Education: University of Texas, Austin (BA, JD)

Robert Randall "Randy" Crane (born May 27, 1965) is the chief United States district judge of the United States District Court for the Southern District of Texas.

== Personal life and education ==
Crane was born in Houston. He graduated from the University of Texas with his Bachelor of Arts degree in Economics in 1985 and his Juris Doctor from the University of Texas School of Law in 1987.

== Career ==
Crane was a private practice attorney in Texas from 1988 to 2002 at the firm of Atlas and Hall LLP.

=== Federal judicial service ===
On the recommendation of Texas Senators Kay Bailey Hutchison and Phil Gramm, Crane was nominated to the United States District Court for the Southern District of Texas by President George W. Bush on September 21, 2001, to a new seat created by 114 Stat. 2762. Crane was confirmed by the United States Senate on March 18, 2002 by a 91–0 vote. He received his commission on March 19, 2002. He became chief judge on November 29, 2022.

=== Notable cases ===
==== Gulf Cartel ====
In April 2008, Crane presided over the case of Carlos Landín Martínez, nicknamed "El Puma," a retired Mexican state police commander who was the number two in command for the notorious Gulf Cartel in Mexico. Landín Martínez, was sentenced to life in prison for federal drug trafficking, money laundering and conspiracy charges. In October 2011, Juan Oscar Garza-Alanis and Josue Ruperto Garza, as well as their sister Cantalicia Garza, pleaded guilty to federal drug and money laundering charges. The Garza brothers and sister helped move cocaine from Mexico to the U.S. and the cash revenue from drug sales in the opposite direction for Landín Martínez.

==== Sheriff drug smuggling ====
Crane presided in the case of former Starr County Sheriff Reymundo "Rey" Guerra who was sentenced by the judge on August 26, 2009, for his role in a drug smuggling plot. The judge sentenced the former sheriff to 56 months in prison for leaking confidential information to known drug smugglers. The judge described Guerra's actions as "a stain on the badge."

==== Panama Unit ====
Crane presided over a case involving several lawmen, including the son of the Hidalgo County Sheriff and son of the City of Hidalgo Police Chief. Most of the lawmen were part of the now-defunct Panama Unit which was a narcotics task force composed of several sheriff's deputies and officers from the Mission Police Dept. The task force answered directly to Hidalgo Co. Sheriff Lupe Trevino. Also indicted for the Panama Unit's role in stealing drug loads from drug dealers and selling them to an alleged drug trafficker includes the now former head of the Hidalgo County Sheriff's Office Crime Stoppers, J.P. Flores. The District Attorney for Hidalgo County, Rene Guerra, has said ""Their credibility went from absolute to zero." As a result, he believes he will have to throw out 50-75 cases from state court that relied heavily on the Panama Unit's testimony. Sheriff Trevino has stated that "personally and professionally," Dec. 12, 2012, the day many of the lawmen were arrested by federal authorities was "my 9/11." Sheriff Trevino and his number two in command, Commander Jose Padilla were subsequently arrested by HSI.

== See also ==
- List of Hispanic and Latino American jurists

Legal offices
Preceded by Seat established by 114 Stat. 2762	Judge of the United States District Court for the Southern District of Texas; 2002–present	Incumbent
Preceded by Lee H. Rosenthal	Chief Judge of the United States District Court for the Southern District of Texas; 2022–present	Incumbent
