= Hidalgo County Sheriff's Office (Texas) =

Sheriff Office in Texas, US

- Abbreviation: HCSO

Agency overview
- Formed: 1852

Jurisdictional structure
- Operations jurisdiction: Hidalgo County, Texas, Texas, United States
- Legal jurisdiction: Hidalgo County, Texas
- General nature: Local civilian police

Operational structure
- Headquarters: 711 El Cibolo Road • Edinburg, TX
- Sworn members: 654 (peace and detention officers)
- Unsworn members: 84 (reserve officers)
- Sheriff responsible: J.E. "Eddie" Guerra
- Agency executive: Mario Lopez, Chief Deputy

The Hidalgo County Sheriff's Office (HCSO) is a local law enforcement agency serving the nearly one million residents of Hidalgo County, Texas, United States. It is headquartered in Edinburg, Texas, the county seat of Hidalgo County.

The jurisdiction of the Hidalgo County Sheriff's Office often overlaps with several other law enforcement agencies, among them the Texas Highway Patrol, the five Hidalgo County Constable Precincts, and several municipal police agencies including the city of McAllen Police Department. The duties of a Texas sheriff generally include keeping the county jail, providing bailiffs for the county and district courts within his county and serving process issued by said courts, and providing general law enforcement services to residents. The current sheriff of Hidalgo County is J.E. "Eddie" Guerra since April 3, 2014.

== History ==
From 1852 to 1882, "sheriffs came and went in rapid succession in Hidalgo County. In one seven-year period, eight men served as sheriff." In 1890, John Closner became Sheriff and shortly afterward, under the protection of James B. Wells Jr., became the county's political boss. During his rule he brought peace to the county and was seen as such an effective leader that he was nicknamed the "father" of Hidalgo County.

On October 8, 2015, the United Kingdom's Daily Mail newspaper released a false article about the security conditions of the region due to the proximity of Hidalgo County, Texas with Reynosa, Tamaulipas, in Mexico. On October 11, 2015, the Hidalgo County Sheriff called out the inaccurate reporting done by the Daily Mail for their flawed story about life on the Texas border. Specifically, the Sheriff mentioned “we are disappointed in the inaccuracies of this report by the Daily Mail and the misleading perception that it created by describing McAllen and Hidalgo County as areas where Texas residents can hear gunshots at all hours of the day and even spot heavily armed drug smugglers in their streets after dark”.

=== Panama Unit ===
The Panama Unit was a special task force comprising Hidalgo County Sheriff's Office deputies and Mission Police Department officers that answered directly to Guadalupe "Lupe" Treviño, Hidalgo County Sheriff from 2005 to 2014, despite him denying such in court. The Unit was designed to target street-level drug dealers.

The Panama Unit was a narcotics task force composed of several deputies from the Hidalgo County Sheriff's Office and officers from the City of Mission Police Department in the Rio Grande Valley. The task force answered directly to Sheriff Treviño and among others, consisted of Sheriff Treviño's son, Johnathan Treviño, the de facto leader of the unit and the former police chief of the City of Hidalgo Rodolfo Espinoza's son, Alexis Rigoberto Espinoza. The drug conspiracy charges against the members, including the head of the Hidalgo County Sheriff's Crimestoppers unit, date back to early 2009.

All but one pleaded guilty to helping certain drug traffickers steal drug loads from other drug dealers. Deputy Jorge Garza, subsequently found guilty, pleaded not guilty and went to trial. Many details about the inner workings of the Sheriff's Office came to fruition. Members of the Panama Unit would conduct bogus traffic stops and guard drug loads for certain traffickers. The District Attorney for Hidalgo County, Rene Guerra, has said "Their credibility went from absolute to zero." As a result, he believes he will have to throw out 50-75 cases from state court that relied heavily on the Panama Unit's testimony. Sheriff Treviño has stated that "personally and professionally," Dec. 12, 2012, the day many of the lawmen were arrested by the FBI and Homeland Security Investigations (HSI), was "my 9/11." All men were found guilty or pleaded guilty and Jonathan Treviño was sentenced to 17 years for his role.

On Christmas Eve of 2013, Hidalgo County Sheriff's Office Commander Jose Padilla was indicted on drug and money laundering charges. While at the Sheriff's Office, Padilla, who was considered the number 2 lawman of Hidalgo County, oversaw the now defunct Panama Unit. During the Panama Unit trial with Deputy Jorge Garza, federal judge Randy Crane notified Padilla that he was the subject of a federal investigation and Padilla subsequently "plead the Fifth" in court and refused to testify. Padilla is accused of helping provide protection to drug traffickers in exchange for money.
