= Maria Teresinha Gomes =

Maria Teresinha Gomes (1933, Funchal – 2007) also known as a generala was a Portuguese woman notable for spending nearly 20 years successfully pretending to be a male army general.

Gomes was born on the Portuguese island of Madeira and ran away from home at the age of 16. Her parents gave her up for dead while Teresinha made her way to Lisbon.

Gomes' general's uniform was a costume made by a Lisbon tailor for the 1974 carnival. She used the name General Tito Aníbal da Paixão Gomes, the name of a brother of hers, who died as a baby.

Gomes was revealed to be biologically a woman in 1992. She had used her invented position of authority to persuade neighbours to hand over part of their savings for investment. High returns were promised, but never forthcoming.

The resulting trial also revealed that Teresinha had posed to others as a lawyer and an employee at the US embassy. Teresinha was eventually given a suspended three-year sentence. She retreated to a village near Alenquer where she died, too poor to pay for her own funeral, in 2007.

A nurse called Joaquina "Quininha" Costa became Gomes' companion, sharing a house with her for 15 years. At Gomes' trial, Costa claimed that they never shared a bedroom, and that she never suspected that Gomes may have been a woman.
