= Héctor Manuel Sauceda Gamboa =

Mexican drug trafficker (died 2009)

Héctor Sauceda Gamboa
- Born: Héctor Manuel Sauceda Gamboa
- Died: 17 February 2009; Reynosa, Tamaulipas, Mexico
- Other names: El Karis; El Kariñoso; El Kary; L-9; R-9; L-64
- Occupation: Gulf Cartel leader
- Relatives: Gregorio Sauceda-Gamboa

Héctor Manuel Sauceda Gamboa (died 17 February 2009), commonly referred to by his alias El Karis, was a Mexican suspected drug trafficker and high-ranking leader of the Gulf Cartel, a drug trafficking organization based in Tamaulipas. He was the brother of the drug lord Gregorio Sauceda Gamboa, another high-ranking drug trafficker who worked under the tutelage of Osiel Cárdenas Guillén, the former top leader of the cartel. El Karis took the lead of the Gulf Cartel in Reynosa following the arrest of Jaime González Durán, a leader of Los Zetas drug cartel, in November 2008.

El Karis was killed in a prolonged gun fight with Mexican law enforcement officers a few months later on 17 February 2009. Reportedly, Los Zetas boss Heriberto Lazcano Lazcano had sent several of his men to Reynosa that same day to kill him for taking the control of Reynosa from the hands of Los Zetas. The death toll of the shootout is virtually unknown, but eyewitnesses suggest that at least 12 people were killed that day in Reynosa. El Karis's death marked one of the earliest conflicts that would eventually result in the separation of the Gulf Cartel and their armed wing, Los Zetas, in 2010.

== Criminal career ==
After the Gulf Cartel's supreme leader Osiel Cárdenas Guillén was arrested in 2003 and extradited to the United States in 2007, the control of the criminal organization was handed over to Jorge Eduardo Costilla Sánchez (alias El Coss), an ex-policeman from Tamaulipas; to Antonio Cárdenas Guillén (alias Tony Tormenta), his brother; and to Heriberto Lazcano Lazcano, who left the Mexican Army special forces in 1998. El Karis was recruited in the Gulf Cartel thanks to his brother Gregorio Sauceda Gamboa (alias El Goyo) in 2003, when the cartel was fighting over the control of Nuevo Laredo, Tamaulipas with the Sinaloa Cartel. His brother was the Gulf Cartel's regional leader in Matamoros and Reynosa under the tutelage of Cárdenas Guillén. Until 2006, El Karis's brother was considered among the Gulf Cartel's most influential drug traffickers, but he was forced to retire after several leaders from the organization ousted him because of cocaine addiction and illness. He stayed in Reynosa for some time but then fled to Matamoros, Tamaulipas when the leadership of the cartel in Reynosa was divided between Jaime González Durán (alias El Hummer) and Antonio Galarza Coronado (alias El Amarillo). Galarza Coronado was arrested by the Mexican police on 1 November 2008; his associate González Durán was apprehended seven days later. Following their arrests, Héctor went to Reynosa to face his brother's rivals and become of the city's crime boss. During his reign as the crime boss of Reynosa, El Karis reportedly forced businesses in the city to pay protection rackets and intimidated journalists who dared to write about his criminal organization.

El Karis was a regional boss of the Gulf Cartel in Matamoros, Reynosa, and Nuevo Laredo, and had some influence in the city of Monterrey.

== Death ==
El Karis was killed in Reynosa following a shootout between the Mexican federal police and Army, and drug traffickers on 17 February 2009. Violence started at around 11:00 a.m. when law enforcement officers intercepted a convoy of vehicles filled with gunmen that travelled through a residential neighborhood in Reynosa. This immediately triggered a series of armed confrontations and road blocks that paralyzed the city. According to eyewitnesses, gunmen forced people out of their vehicles to block the city's streets. The shootout lasted several hours—with law enforcement sources saying at least more than two—and extended throughout six neighborhoods in the city. Reporters on the scene stated that roughly 12 people were killed in the shootout, and insisted that least five of them were soldiers. Mexican media outlets indicated that at least 20 people were killed in the firefights, with dozens more injured. The Secretariat of National Defense (SEDENA), however, stated that none of their elements were killed in the operation. The death of one civilian was confirmed by the state police, but the exact figures are virtually unknown. That same day, Los Zetas leader Heriberto Lazcano Lazcano ordered several of his gunmen to raid Reynosa, kill El Karis, and bring the city back under Zeta control. The shootout turned into a three-way fight between Mexican law enforcement, gunmen of Los Zetas, and Gulf Cartel sicarios. At the time of his death, El Karis was wearing a white T-shirt and blue sport pants. He was not carrying any weapons. A few meters away from his body was the corpse of his alleged personal bodyguard with a golden AK-47. In the shootout, Los Zetas gave their first demonstrations of their operational capacity through barricades in the city's entrances, exits, and main streets that took the city "hostage" while drug traffickers and law enforcement fought in broad daylight. El Karis's death made Reynosa the center battleground of the Gulf–Zeta conflict.

=== Aftermath ===
El Karis's death created a crack in the delicate alliance between the Gulf Cartel and their paramilitary squad, Los Zetas. While in power in the late 1990s, as Osiel Cárdenas Guillén and the Gulf Cartel grew in influence, he became very paranoid. He believed that his rival mob bosses throughout Tamaulipas wanted him dead and that the Gulf Cartel's future heralded violence and conflict. To keep his organization afloat and protect himself from any attacks, Cárdenas Guillén sought for recruits in the Mexican military to create his private unit of bodyguards. He recruited the Mexican Army Special Forces soldier Arturo Guzmán Decena and at least 30 other military men. The new group, which became known as Los Zetas, had the task of protecting their leader and killing his enemies. But when Cárdenas Guillén was arrested in 2003 and extradited to the United States in 2007, Los Zetas and the Gulf Cartel tried to fill the leadership vacuum with their respective commanders. At the same time, too, Los Zetas worked towards their own independence. During the 1990s and early 2000s, the Gulf Cartel "operated with a certain structure that allowed for rivalries among lieutenants to exist without affecting the organization as a whole". But with Cárdenas Guillén's behind bars, several top leaders within the cartel fought to take control of the leadership void. After several conflicts and disagreements, Gulf Cartel and Los Zetas ended their alliance in early 2010, prompting an all-out war between both groups in Tamaulipas and its neighboring states.

== Bounty ==
El Karis was among the most-wanted drug traffickers by the Procuraduría General de la República (PGR) of Mexico. In September 2008, he was indicted by the U.S. government along with six other high-ranking drug lords in the Federal District of Columbia for international drug trafficking charges.

== See also ==
- Mexican drug war
