= Aurelio Cano Flores =

Mexican drug trafficker (born 1972)

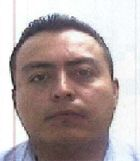
- Born: 3 May 1972 (age 54); Tamaulipas, Mexico
- Other names: Yeyo; Yankee
- Years active: 2001–2009
- Employers: Federal Judicial Police; Gulf Cartel
- Known for: Drug trafficking Gulf Cartel leader
- Status: Incarcerated
- Conviction: Conspiracy to distribute more than five kilograms of cocaine and more than 1,000 kilograms of marijuana (21 U.S.C. §§ 959, 960, and 963)
- Penalty: 35 years imprisonment

Details
- Imprisoned at: Beaumont Low FCI

Aurelio Cano Flores (born 3 May 1972), commonly referred to by his aliases Yankee and/or Yeyo, is an imprisoned Mexican drug trafficker and former high-ranking leader of the Gulf Cartel, a Mexican drug trafficking organization. He is also a former member of the Federal Judicial Police in Tamaulipas.

Born in the state of Tamaulipas, Cano Flores became a drug trafficker in 2001 while still serving as a police officer. His role in Mexican law enforcement and his ties with the Gulf Cartel allowed him to recruit several other policemen into the criminal organization's ranks. As a high-ranking leader, Cano Flores served as the regional boss of the Gulf Cartel in Los Guerra, a town in the municipality of Ciudad Miguel Alemán, Tamaulipas. He was also a leader in Camargo, Tamaulipas, where he coordinated heroin, cocaine, and marijuana shipments to the United States.

In 2010 he was named in a U.S. federal indictment with 19 other high-ranking drug lords of La Compañía (The Company), a name used to describe the Gulf Cartel and Los Zetas as a conglomerate. He was arrested by the Mexican federal police in June 2009 and extradited to the United States while pending drug trafficking charges on 19 August 2011. Cano Flores was later sentenced to 35 years in prison and ordered to forfeit US$15 billion on 13 May 2013, making him the "highest ranking Gulf Cartel member to be convicted by a U.S. jury in the past 15 years".

== Criminal career ==
Aurelio Cano Flores was born in Tamaulipas, Mexico on 3 May 1972. He joined the Gulf Cartel, a Mexican drug trafficking organization, in 2001, while still working in the Federal Judicial Police. As a policeman, Cano Flores was able to recruit several of his colleagues to the Gulf Cartel, where they collected the organization's drug proceeds and protected the drug shipments that headed to the U.S.-Mexico border. Within some time, he rose in the echelons of the cartel, became a high-ranking leader, and was appointed as the Gulf Cartel's boss in the border area of Los Guerra, a small town in the municipality of Ciudad Miguel Alemán, Tamaulipas, just across the international border from Roma, Texas. While in power, Cano Flores also worked with Los Zetas, a criminal organization formed in the late 1990s by ex-commandos of the Mexican Army who served as the Gulf Cartel's paramilitary wing. To keep the Gulf Cartel afloat, he reportedly intimidated and used violence against rival drug traffickers and Mexican law enforcement officers. Prior to his arrest on 10 June 2009, he was operating as the Gulf Cartel leader in Camargo, Tamaulipas and coordinated heroin, cocaine, and marijuana shipments to the United States.

=== Arrest and trial ===
Cano Flores was arrested by the Mexican federal police on 10 June 2009 while in possession of a firearm, a magazine device, and 30 rounds of ammunition. (Note: Other sources state that Cano Flores was arrested on 11 June 2009.) On 4 November 2010, he was indicted along with 19 other drug traffickers of La Compañía (The Company), a name that refers to the Gulf Cartel and Los Zetas collectively, and charged with conspiracy to traffic over 5 kilos (11 lbs) of cocaine and at least 1,000 kilos (2204.6 lbs) of marijuana to the United States for future distribution. The United States Department of the Treasury had named Cano Flores in 2009 as a close associate of the Zeta bosses Heriberto Lazcano Lazcano and Miguel Treviño Morales, considered by the government as "significant foreign narcotics traffickers". (Note: Though the United States Department of State indicated in a 2013 report that the indictment was issued in November 2010, other sources state that the indictment was carried out in July 2009.)

He was then extradited to the United States from Mexico on 19 August 2011 to face charges on drug trafficking. At the time of his extradition, U.S. authorities indicated that he faced a minimum prison sentence of ten years and a maximum penalty of life in prison for his charges. On 13 May 2013, U.S. District Judge Barbara Jacobs Rothstein sentenced Cano Flores to 35 years in prison and ordered him to forfeit US$15 billion. He was the highest drug lord of the Gulf Cartel to be convicted by a U.S. jury in 15 years.

== Bounty ==
The U.S. Department of State was offering up to US$5 million for information leading to his arrest and/or conviction. Cano Flores also has two aliases: Yeyo and Yankee. Some media outlets also referred to him by another name, Efraín Sánchez Castillo.

=== Kingpin Act sanction ===
On 24 March 2010, the United States Department of the Treasury sanctioned Cano Flores under the Foreign Narcotics Kingpin Designation Act (sometimes referred to simply as the "Kingpin Act"), for his involvement in drug trafficking along with fifty-three other international criminals and ten foreign entities. The act prohibited U.S. citizens and companies from doing any kind of business activity with him, and virtually froze all his assets in the U.S.

== See also ==
- Mexican drug war
