= Gregorio Sauceda-Gamboa =

Mexican drug lord

Gregorio Sauceda Gamboa
- Born: ca. 1965; Tamaulipas, Mexico
- Other names: El Goyo, Metro-2, Caramuela
- Occupation: Lieutenant
- Employer(s): Ministerial Police, Gulf Cartel, Los Metros
- Successor: Samuel Flores Borrego

Gregorio Sauceda Gamboa is a Mexican illegal drug trafficker of the Gulf Cartel.

Sauceda was a former investigative police officer, who helped smuggle an average of 10 tons of cocaine and 30 tons of marijuana across the border each month.

== Arrest ==
He was captured on April 30, 2009 in Matamoros, Tamaulipas along with his wife and his bodyguard, Miguel Ángel Reyes Grajales. Mexican Authorities had offered a 30 million pesos (about US$2.1 million) bounty for information leading to his capture.

== Kingpin Act sanction ==
On 24 March 2010, the United States Department of the Treasury sanctioned Sauceda-Gamboa under the Foreign Narcotics Kingpin Designation Act (sometimes referred to simply as the "Kingpin Act"), for his involvement in drug trafficking along with fifty-three other international criminals and ten foreign entities. The act prohibited U.S. citizens and companies from doing any kind of business activity with him, and virtually froze all his assets in the U.S.

== See also ==
- List of Mexico's 37 most-wanted drug lords
- Gulf Cartel
- Los Zetas
