= Timeline of the Mexican drug war =

The timeline of some of the most relevant events in the Mexican drug war is set out below. Although violence between drug cartels had been occurring for three decades, the Mexican government held a generally passive stance regarding cartel violence through the 1980s and early 2000s.

That changed on December 11, 2006, when the newly elected President Felipe Calderón sent 6,500 Mexican Army soldiers to the state of Michoacán to end drug violence there. This is regarded as the first major retaliation made against the cartel violence, and viewed as the starting point of the Mexican drug war between the government and the drug cartels. As time passed, Calderón continued to escalate his anti-drug campaign, in which as of 2008 there were about 45,000 troops involved along with state and federal police forces. In 2017, after the capture of Sinaloa cartel leader Joaquín "El Chapo" Guzmán and his extradition to the U.S., turf wars between Sinaloa and CJNG escalated as did the number of homicides in Mexico.

In December 2018, incoming President Andrés Manuel López Obrador pledged to bring down gang-fueled violence and on January 30, 2019, he declared the end of the Mexican drug war. but homicides hit a record level in 2019 with 34,600 murders and continued to climb even during the coronavirus lockdown.

== 2000-2009 ==
=== 2006 ===
- November 25 – Popular singer Valentín Elizalde is ambushed and gunned down along with his manager (and best friend) Mario Mendoza Grajeda, and driver Reynaldo Ballesteros, in the border city of Reynosa, Tamaulipas, across the border from McAllen, Texas.
- December 1 – President Felipe Calderón assumes office. He imposes a cap on salaries of high-ranking public servants and orders a raise on the salaries of the Federal Police and the Mexican Armed Forces.
- December 11 – Operation Michoacán is launched against the La Familia Michoacana cartel. A total of more than 60 Mexican soldiers and more than 100 police officers, and 500 cartel gunmen are killed in the operation.

=== 2007 ===
- January 2 – Operation Baja California is launched.
- January 20 – Drug lord Osiel Cárdenas Guillén is extradited to the USA.
- March 17 – Zhenli Ye Gon is relieved of US$213 million in Mexico City.
- May 14 – Jorge Altriste, head of operations for Mexico's elite police force in Tijuana, is murdered.
- December 2 – Popular singer Sergio Gómez is kidnapped and killed.
- December 8 – Gerardo García Pimentel, a crime reporter, is killed.
- December 29 – The entire police force in the town of Playas de Rosarito, Baja California, is disarmed under suspicions of collaborating with drug cartels.

For 2007, the drug-related death toll reached 2,477.

=== 2008 ===
- January 1 – The Federal government, along with SEDENA, launches the Joint Operation Nuevo León-Tamaulipas in order to eliminate the operation areas of both the Gulf Cartel and Los Zetas.
- January 21 – Mexican security forces capture drug lord Alfredo Beltrán Leyva.
- March 27 – The Federal government launches the Operation Chihuahua to confront the three drug cartels operating in the state. Ciudad Juárez's violence is among the major concerns in this operation.
- April 26 – 15 people are killed in a gun battle between the Tijuana Cartel and a rival drug cartel in Tijuana, Baja California.
- May 8 – Acting commissioner of the Federal Police Édgar Eusebio Millán Gómez is gunned down in Mexico City. He was the highest-ranking Mexican official killed.
- May 9 – Esteban Robles Espinosa, the commander of Mexico's investigative police force, is murdered in Mexico City.
- May 13 – The Federal government launches the Operation Sinaloa to crack down on the Sinaloa Cartel, the Beltrán-Leyva Cartel, and Los Zetas in the state.
- May 28 – Seven Federal Police agents die in a shootout in Culiacán.
- May 31 – The United States announces it is implementing a drug trafficking law to impose financial sanctions on Mexican drug cartels.
- June 26 – Police commander Igor Labastida is shot dead in a restaurant in Mexico City.
- June 30 – The Mérida Initiative, a US$1.6 billion security cooperation agreement between the US and Mexico, announced on October 22, 2007, is signed into law.
- September 13 – In Ocoyoacac, 24 bodies are found at a national park called La Marquesa; all bodies were shot and showed signs of torture.
- September 15 – 2008 Morelia grenade attacks: eight civilians are killed and more than 100 are injured in Morelia after hand grenades are thrown into a crowd.
- September 17 – Over 200 people across Mexico, Guatemala, Italy and the United States, including members of the Gulf Cartel and the 'Ndrangheta are arrested in a major anti-drug trafficking operation called Operation Solare.
- October 22 – Police capture boss Jesús Zambada García of the Sinaloa Cartel after a shootout in Mexico City.
- October 24 – Criminal investigator Andrés Dimitriadis is shot dead by cartel gunmen (sicarios) in his car on his way home in Cuernavaca, Morelos.
- October 26 – The Mexican army captures drug lord Eduardo Arellano Félix after a shootout in Tijuana.
- November 2 – The Federal Police chief Víctor Gerardo Garay resigns amidst claims of corruption. He is arrested and charged on December 10 for protecting the Beltrán-Leyva Cartel.
- November 6 – In Reynosa, the Mexican army makes the largest weapon seizure in the history of Mexico. The seizure includes 288 assault rifles, 126 handguns, 166 grenades, 14 TNT explosives, 500,000 cartridges, over 1,000 ammunition magazines, and a rocket launcher.
- November 7 – The Federal Police arrest Jaime González Durán in Tamaulipas; he was a founding member of Los Zetas.
- November 17 – Rodolfo de la Guardia García, ex-director of Mexico's Interpol office, is arrested and charged of protecting the Beltrán-Leyva Cartel.
- November 19 – Mexican Interpol chief Ricardo Gutiérrez Vargas is arrested on suspicion of links with drug cartels.
- November 21 – Noé Ramírez Mandujano, ex-head of Mexico's anti-organized crime agency, is arrested on suspicion of links with drug cartels.
- November 30 – Guatemalan and Mexican drug cartels clash on the two countries' border, leaving 18 dead.
- December 10 – Felix Batista, an American anti-kidnapping expert, is kidnapped in Saltillo.
- December 21 – Seven off-duty soldiers and one police commander are kidnapped, tortured and decapitated. Their heads are left at a shopping center located in Chilpancingo with a threat note to the military.

For 2008, the drug-related death toll reached 6,290.

=== 2009 ===
- January 2 – Mexican authorities arrest Alberto Espinoza Barrón, one of the La Familia Michoacana cartel leaders.
- January 6 – Gunmen fire on and throw grenades at the Televisa TV station in Monterrey during a nightly newscast, causing no injuries. A note left on the scene reads: "Stop reporting just on us. Report on the narco's political leaders."
- January 22 – Police arrest Santiago Meza, a man who allegedly dissolved 300 bodies of rival drug traffickers for his boss Teodoro García Simental.
- February 3 – The body of retired General Mauro Enrique Tello Quiñónez, who had been appointed a special drugs consultant to the Benito Juárez municipality mayor, is found near Cancún along with the bodies of his aide and a driver.
- February 5 – Police capture trafficker and lieutenant Gerónimo Gámez García in Mexico City.
- February 7 – The Federal government, along with SEDENA, launches the Operation Quintana Roo, sending thousands of troops to Cancún and several cities within the state. Several police officers in that state are found guilty of drug trafficking, and 'El Puma,' a Gulf Cartel lieutenant, is captured.
- February 10 – Military troops take over a police station in Cancún in connection with the torture and murder of former general Mauro Enrique Tello Quiñónez, who led an elite anti-drugs squad.
- February 12 – Gunmen assassinate Detective Ramón Jasso Rodríguez, the chief in charge of the homicide division for the state police of Nuevo León.
- February 15 – The Mexican Navy, with the help of the United States Coast Guard, confiscate 7 tons of cocaine being transported on a fishing vessel in international waters in the Pacific Ocean.
- February 17 – A shootout takes place in the city of Reynosa between members of the Mexican Army and presumed members of the Gulf Cartel and Los Zetas. The death of the high-ranking Gulf Cartel leader Héctor Manuel Sauceda Gamboa is confirmed.
- February 20 – Ciudad Juárez's Police Chief Robert Orduna announces his resignation after two police officers are killed. Drug traffickers had threatened to kill one police officer every 48 hours until the chief resigned.
- February 22 – Five assailants attack the convoy of Chihuahua governor, José Reyes Baeza, killing a bodyguard.
- February 24 – Mexican authorities extradite Miguel Ángel Caro Quintero, top-leader of the Sonora Cartel, to the U.S.
  - Heavily armed gunmen assassinate Adrián López, mayor of Vista Hermosa, Michoacán.
  - U.S. raids code-named Operation Xcellerator on the Sinaloa cartel in California, Minnesota and Maryland lead to 755 arrests, the discovery of a 'super meth lab' and laboratory equipment capable of producing 12,000 ecstasy pills per hour.
- February 25 – The New York Times reports on ATF statistics stating that 90% of traced guns originated in the United States. This prompts a resurgence of heated debates in USA concerning the reinstatement of the assault weapons ban.
- February 28 – Close to 1,800 Mexican troops arrive in Ciudad Juárez as part of a contingent of 5,000 Federal Police and troops.
- March 9 – The Mexican Army confirms the arrest of 26 members of the Arrellano Félix Cartel, including Ángel Jácome Gamboa (El Kaibil), one state police officer, one municipal police officer, and other suspects.
- March 10 – The Mexican Ministry of Defense orders 6 Eurocopter EC 725 Helicopters from Eurocopter to transport soldiers in special operations. The deal is finalized behind closed doors between Felipe Calderón and French President Nicolas Sarkozy.
- March 12 – The United States Department of Homeland Security states that it is considering using the National Guard 'as a last resort' to counter the threat of drug violence in Mexico from spilling over the border into the US.
- March 19 – Mexican military captures Vicente Zambada Niebla alleged Sinaloa Cartel drug boss and son of drug lord Ismael Zambada García El Mayo.
- March 22 – Gunmen kill Édgar Garcia, a state police commander in charge of investigating kidnappings and extortion in the western state of Michoacán.
- March 23 - Mexican authorities publish a List of Mexico's 37 most-wanted drug lords
- March 25 – A Mexican Special Forces Unit captures one of Mexico's most-wanted drug smugglers, Héctor Huerta Ríos.
- March 26 – A US Marshal, Vincent Bustamante who was the subject of an arrest warrant, is found dead in Ciudad Juárez.
  - U.S. Secretary of State Hillary Clinton announces the future delivery of an additional 8 Black Hawk helicopters to Mexican security forces.
  - Germán Torres Jiménez, alias El Z-25, a founding member of Los Zetas, is captured in Poza Rica.
- April 2 – Vicente Carrillo Leyva, son of Amado Carrillo Fuentes, is arrested in Mexico City.
- April 19 – Eight Federal Police agents are killed in an attack on a prison convoy transporting senior leaders of the Beltrán-Leyva Cartel.
  - The Federal Police captures 44 suspected members of La Familia Cartel, including its chief Rafael Cedeño Hernández "El Cede".
- April 22 – The bodies of two undercover federal agents are found in Durango, along with a note saying "Neither priests nor rulers will ever get El Chapo" (referring to Joaquín Guzmán and with clear allusion to the comments of the Archbishop of Durango Héctor González Martínez.)
- May 17 – Gulf cartel gunmen disguised as police officers break into a prison in Zacatecas and free 50 inmates.
- May 27 – 27 high-ranking officials in Michoacán, including 10 mayors and a judge, are arrested for suspected collaboration with La Familia Cartel.
- June 6 – A total of 16 cartel gunmen and 2 Mexican Army soldiers are killed during a four-hour shootout in Acapulco.
- June 15 – Juan Manuel Jurado Zarzoza a lieutenant of the Gulf Cartel in Cancún is captured.
- June 26 – Gunmen attempt to kill Ernesto Cornejo, a Partido Acción Nacional candidate, in Sonora, but fail.
- July 7 – Anti-crime activist Benjamin LeBaron and his brother-in-law Luis Widmar are murdered after armed men storm their house in Galeana, Chihuahua.
- July 11 – Several state police offices are attacked by gunmen in Michoacán, leaving several injured and 2 members of the Mexican Army dead.
- July 14 – Twelve Mexican Federal Police agents are kidnapped, tortured and killed, with their bodies later disposed on a mountain highway. The agents were investigating crime in President Felipe Calderón's home state of Michoacán.
  - Julio César Godoy Toscano, who was elected on July 5, 2009, to the Lower House of Congress, is discovered to be a top-ranking member of La Familia Michoacana drug cartel, and is accused of protecting that cartel. He is now a fugitive.
- August 6 – A shootout between police and gunmen leaves over a dozen dead and 22 injured in Pachuca. Some kidnapped Federal agents are found alive, but the confrontation initiates simultaneous shootouts and grenade attacks on police installations around Mexico.
- August 8 – Federal Police arrest Manuel Invanovich Zambrano Flores, a top lieutenant of the Tijuana Cartel.
- August 9 – Mexican police defuse an attempt to kill President Felipe Calderón by the Sinaloa Cartel.
- August 20 – The U.S. Drug Enforcement Administration (DEA) disarticulate a large Mexican drug operation in Chicago, knocking out a major distribution network operating out of the city. The drug operation allegedly brought 1.5 to 2 tons of cocaine every month to Chicago from Mexico, and shipped millions of dollars south of the border.
- September 3 – Gunmen attack a drug clinic in Ciudad Juárez, lining up patients against a wall and killing at least 17. José Rodolfo Escajeda of the Juárez cartel is arrested several days later.
- September 16 – Ten people are killed in another gun attack on a drug rehabilitation clinic in Ciudad Juárez.
- November 3 – Los Zetas founder Braulio Arellano Domínguez is killed by the Mexican Navy in the state of Veracruz.
- December 15 – As part of the Mérida Initiative, the Mexican Air Force receives five Bell 412 helicopters worth $66 million from the United States to use for transport and reconnaissance missions for Mexico's drug war.
- December 16 – A two-hour shootout between 200 Mexican Marines and Beltrán-Leyva Cartel gunmen leads to the death of Marcos Arturo Beltrán-Leyva, the leader of the criminal organization, in an upscale resort in Cuernavaca. Four of his bodyguards are also killed, one of whom commits suicide while surrounded by the Marines. Two marines are also injured while another, Navy 3rd Petty Officer Melquisedec Angulo Córdova, dies while being treated for his injuries.
- December 22 – Only hours after the burial of 3rd Petty Officer Melquisedec Angulo Córdova, gunmen break into his family's house and kill his mother and three other relatives. The shooting is believed to be retaliation for the death of Marcos Arturo Beltrán-Leyva, as well as a warning against the military forces.

For 2009, the drug-related death toll reached 7,724.

== 2010-2020 ==
=== 2010 ===
- January 2 – Carlos Beltrán Leyva, brother of Marcos Arturo Beltrán-Leyva, is arrested by Federal Police officers in Culiacán, Sinaloa.
- January 8 – Due to high crime rates in the municipality of Tancítaro, Michoacán, the Municipal Police force is disbanded. City officials leave the Army and State Police in charge of public security.
- January 12 – Federal Police agents arrest a partner of the Tijuana Cartel, Teodoro "El Teo" García Simental in La Paz, Baja California Sur.
- January 28 – Ernesto Coronel Peña, Juan Jaime Coronel, Juan Ernesto Coronel Herrera, and Gael Carbel Aldana, several members of the Coronel clan are arrested.
- January 31 – Sixteen teenagers with no criminal ties are gunned down at a party in Ciudad Juárez.
- February 1 – In Torreón, Coahuila, a group of gunmen open fire at three different bars throughout the city, killing 10 and injuring over 40 people.
- February 24 – Los Zetas engage in a violent turf war against is former employer/partner, the Gulf Cartel, in the northern border city of Reynosa, Tamaulipas, rendering some border towns to "ghost towns".
- March 5 – The Red Cross in Mexico no longer treats gunshot victims after finding themselves caught in cross fire.
- March 14 – Three people associated with U.S. consulate are killed in Chihuahua in two drive-by shootings. Two of their children are injured. Presidents Obama and Calderón condemn the attack.
- March 19 – Two graduate students from the ITESM in Monterrey are mistakenly killed by soldiers at the university's entrance during a gun battle against drug traffickers. Both students had engineering scholarships for academic excellence.
- March 23 – US Secretary of State Hillary Clinton, Defence Secretary Robert Gates, Chairman of the Joint Chiefs of Staff Admiral Mike Mullen and Homeland Security Secretary Janet Napolitano visit Mexico and pledge increased support in the fight against drug cartels.
- March 30 – Cartel gunmen launch seven coordinated assaults against government forces by setting up roadblocks near Army garrisons, firing on checkpoints and ambushing patrols. Among the weapons used are armored vehicles, explosive devices and grenade launchers. The attacks are neutralized by Mexican troops. Mexican forces kill 18 cartel gunmen and seize more than 50 assault rifles, 61 grenades, 8 homemade explosive devices, numerous grenade launchers and 6 armored vehicles. Army casualties are limited to one soldier with an injured toe.
- April 1 – Cartel gunmen initiate road blocks in Reynosa, and a single cartel member is killed in a shootout with Mexican soldiers. In Tampico, cartel gunmen ambush a state police checkpoint, killing one officer and wounding one officer, as well as a bystander.
- April 23 – In San Dimas, Durango, troops clash with gunmen. Six gunmen are killed and one is captured. The army reports that only one of their own was injured.
- May 15 – In Torreón, a group of gunmen open fire during the inauguration of 'Bar Las Juanas,' killing 8 and injuring 19 people.
- May 31 – A mass grave containing 55 bodies is found in an abandoned mine near Taxco, Guerrero.
- June 2 – In Tubutama, Sonora, right across the U.S. border from New Mexico, a gunfight between rival drug cartels leaves 21 people dead.
- June 9 – Leader of the Los Zetas division in the state of Nuevo León, Raúl Héctor Luna, is arrested in Monterrey.
- June 10 – 2010 Chihuahua shootings: 40 people are killed and at least 4 others are wounded in an attack by at least 30 gunmen in Chihuahua. The attack occurs at multiple places within the city, including a rehabilitation center where 19 of the victims die.
- June 14 – In Michoacán, 12 Federal Police officers are killed and 13 wounded, several cartel gunmen are killed as well. A separate attack takes place in Ciudad Juárez, resulting in 3 gunmen dead and 2 Mexican soldiers wounded.
- June 15 – Army soldiers kill 15 gunmen and confiscate twenty guns and two homemade explosives during a 40-minute shootout on the outskirts of Taxco.
- June 26 – Banda Singer Sergio Vega, also known as "El Shaka", is murdered outside the city of Los Mochis in the state of Sinaloa.
- June 27 – Gunmen kill nine people at a drug rehabilitation clinic in Gómez Palacio, Durango.
- July 15 – La Línea, the Juárez Cartel's armed wing, uses a car bomb for the first time, setting a deadly trap against federal police in the city of Ciudad Juárez; the car bomb kills three police officers.
- July 18 – Gunmen in five SUVs drive up to a party on the outskirts of Torreón, Coahuila, and open fire killing 17 party-goers.
- July 25 – In state of Nuevo Leon, 70 corpses are exhumed from clandestine mass graves. The largest, located in municipality of Benito Juárez, accounts for 51 of the total 70.
- July 29 – Ignacio Coronel Villarreal, one of the three leaders of the Sinaloa Cartel is killed in a shootout with the Army in Zapopan, Jalisco. One soldier is also killed and another wounded during the shootout.
- July 30 – On the heavy trafficked highway Matamoros-Ciudad Victoria, just outside San Fernando, Tamaulipas, 15 dead bodies from Los Zetas are left for display by the Gulf Cartel on the middle of the road.
- August 22 – Four decapitated and mutilated bodies are discovered hanging by their ankles from a bridge in Cuernavaca in the southern state of Morelos. Héctor Beltrán Leyva takes responsibility for the killings in a message left with the bodies, which reads: "This is what will happen to all those who support the traitor Edgar Valdez Villarreal".
- August 24 – Tamaulipas massacre: Following a gunfight in the state of Tamaulipas between gunmen alleged to be drug traffickers, in which three gunmen and a marine are killed, 72 bodies are recovered from a remote ranch in the state of Tamaulipas. It was "the biggest single discovery of its kind" in the ongoing drug war. The 58 men and 14 women were believed to be undocumented migrants from South and Central America trying to cross the border to the United States. A surviving migrant claimed that the migrants were kidnapped by the Los Zetas cartel and killed for refusing to do work for them. Twenty one rifles, 101 ammunition clips, four bullet-proof vests, camouflage uniforms and four vehicles are seized by officials. The bodies were found in a room, some of which were piled up on top of each other.
- August 30 – Authorities capture Edgar "La Barbie" Valdez Villarreal, a U.S.-born trafficker who was fighting to lead the Beltrán-Leyva Cartel based in central Mexico.
- September 2 – Twenty seven suspected drug cartel gunmen are shot dead in clashes near the U.S. border in the state of Tamaulipas; the bodies were found on a property believed to be owned by Los Zetas.
- September 8 – The mayor of El Naranjo, San Luis Potosí, Alexander López García, is killed in his office by a group of gunmen.
- September 9 – Gunmen kill 25 people in a series of drug-related attacks in Ciudad Juárez, marking the deadliest day in more than two years for the Mexican border city. Two graffiti messages appear in Ciudad Juárez threatening the Sinaloa Cartel drug lord Joaquin Guzman. One message reads: "You are killing our sons. You already did, and now we are going to kill your families."
- September 10 – In the border city of Reynosa, across the border from McAllen, Texas, 85 inmates – 66 of whom were convicted or on trial for federal charges like weapons possession or drugs – scale the Reynosa prison's 20-foot (6-meter) walls using ladders. Forty-four prison guards and employees were under investigation. Two were missing. A total of 201 inmates had escaped from prisons in the state of Tamaulipas since the start of the year.
- September 12 – Mexican marines arrest Sergio Villarreal Barragán, a lieutenant of the Beltrán-Leyva Cartel.
- September 16 – In Matamoros, Tamaulipas, over 25 people are killed after a confrontation between the Gulf Cartel, Los Zetas, and elements of the Mexican Navy, during the eve celebration of Independence Day.
- October 18 – Mexican authorities seize 105 tons of marijuana bound for the U.S., representing the biggest bust in the history of the state of Baja California. Soldiers and police seize the drugs in pre-dawn raids in three neighborhoods. The marijuana is found wrapped in 10,000 packages, with an estimated street value in Mexico of 4.2 billion pesos, or about $338 million.
- October 22 – Gunmen kill 14 people at a boy's birthday party in Ciudad Juárez, Chihuahua.
- October 24 – Gunmen in Tijuana kill 13 people at a drug rehab clinic.
- October 27 – Gunmen kill 15 people at a car wash in Tepic, Nayarit.
- November 4 – In Ciudad Mante, Tamaulipas, 8 beheaded corpses are found on the trunk of a pickup truck. On top of the corpses, a poster reads the following: “This happens for supporting Los Zetas. Here are all your halcones (informants). Sincerely, the Gulf Cartel."
- November 5 – Antonio Ezequiel Cárdenas Guillen, co-leader of the Gulf Cartel, is shot and killed during a gun battle against Mexican authorities, along with more than 50 of his gunmen, in the border city of Matamoros, Tamaulipas. Although not confirmed, some local sources claim over 100 people were killed in Matamoros that day
- November 9 – Customs authorities at the International Airport of Mexico City seize 113 kilos of cocaine and two thousand bottles of pills with Risperidone.
- November 9 – Mayor Gregorio Barradas Miravete is found executed with a note left on him that read: "This is going to happen to all those who continue to support Los Zetas."
- November 22 – In the rural outsides of Ciudad Victoria, Tamaulipas, drug cartel gunmen threaten a 77-year-old local entrepreneur, Don Alejo Garza Támez, to give away all his property. According to the report, they gave Don Alejo one day to leave his ranch before the gunmen arrived. If not, they threatened to kill him. Instead, Don Alejo made a fortress in his own ranch; setting up traps, and placing rifles on every house window, waiting for the arrival of the gunmen all by himself. When the gunmen arrived, Don Alejo shot and killed 4 of them, and gravely injured 2. Nevertheless, Don Alejo was killed, too, but he was commemorated for his heroic act.
- December 3 – In Cuernavaca, Morelos, Mexican authorities capture Edgar Jiménez Lugo, alias "El Ponchis," a 14-year-old hitman from the South Pacific Cartel. He is the youngest sicario that there is register of in Mexico; "El Ponchis" was well known for carrying out over 300 violent executions, most of them by mutilation, torture, and decapitation.
- December 9 – Mexican authorities report that Nazario Moreno González, leader of La Familia Michoacana had been killed in a shootout with the federal police. However, it is later speculated that the drug lord is still alive, and on March 9, 2014, the Mexican government claims to have finally killed him in Michoacan.
- December 18 – In Nuevo Laredo, Tamaulipas, 151 inmates escape a federal prison—58 of them high-profile criminals—and investigations mention that the convicts left through the front door, implying that the director allowed them to escape.
- December 19 – 2010 Puebla oil pipeline explosion: In the state of Puebla, a pipeline owned by PEMEX company explodes after thieves from Los Zetas attempt to siphon off the oil. The explosion kills 28 people, injures 52, and damages over 115 homes.
- December 28 – Around 60 gunmen storm the small, indigenous town of Tierras Coloradas, Durango. The gunmen burn all the houses (40), cars (27), and an elementary school; over 200 natives are forced to flee the area, others are killed.

For 2010, the drug-related deaths reached 15,273.

=== 2011 ===
- January 8 – 28 bodies were discovered in Acapulco, including the decapitated bodies of 15 young men, with the heads scattered around them, which were found outside the Plaza Sendero shopping center. Media reports say that three messages signed by Joaquin "El Chapo" Guzman, leader of the Sinaloa cartel, were found alongside the bodies. The other bodies include 6 found in a taxi behind a supermarket, 4 riddled with bullets in two residential neighborhoods and 3 others in other locations.
- February 16 – In San Luis Potosí, the American ICE agent Jaime Zapata was ambushed, shot, and killed on a highway during his trajectory to Mexico City by a group of gunmen, later confirmed to be Los Zetas. The second agent, Victor Avila, was wounded, and is now in the United States. The gunmen involved in the shooting have been apprehended.
- February 27 – Sergio Mora Cortes, aka "El Toto," is captured by Mexican Marines in Saltillo, Coahuila. Mora Cortes was a leader of Los Zetas in the state of San Luis Potosí, and he was wanted for the murder of the American ICE agent Jaime Zapata and for the murder of a Nuevo Laredo police chief.
- February 28 – 7 bodies found hanging from bridges in Mazatlán, Sinaloa. Messages left with the corpses alleged that the dead were members of the South Pacific Cartel.
- March 1 – A mass grave with over 20 bodies was uncovered in San Miguel Totolapan, Guerrero. Other sources, however, mention that more than 70 bodies were exhumed.
- March 2 – A three-day shooting was registered between the Mexican Marines and Los Zetas in the city of Valle Hermoso, Tamaulipas. During these three days, all local businesses and schools closed; a convoy of 50 SUV's from Los Zetas was seen in the rural highway outside the city.
- March 8–18 killed in gunfights in Abasolo, Tamaulipas. Most of the dead are believed to be operators for the warring Zetas and the Gulf Cartel. Mexican troops were deployed to restore order.
- March 10 – Jorge Hernández Espinoza, the Director of Public Security for Santiago Tangamandapio, Michoacán, was found dead in his vehicle with a single shot to his head and three shots to his chest.
- March 29 – Police found the bodies of 6 men and 1 woman inside a car abandoned in an exclusive gated community near Cuernavaca.
- April 2 – In Ciudad Juarez, a group of gunmen attacked two bars with fire bombs and shootings in less than forty-eight hours, killing over 15 people.
- April 4 – A clash between the police and drug cartel gunmen left 7 dead and 6 people injured in Acapulco, Guerrero. In addition, a whole shopping center was burned down by the gunmen, and a dozen of the stores were left in ruins.
- April 26 – 2011 San Fernando massacre: In San Fernando, Tamaulipas, after exhuming more than 40 mass graves, the final body count reached 193 corpses. Although not confirmed, some newspapers mention that the body count surpassed 500, but that the state government of Tamaulipas supposedly censored and prevented such publications.
- May 1 – The drug-war death toll for Mexico in April was 1,400, the highest of any month since the Mexican government began its war on illicit drug trade four years ago. The previous high was 1,322 in August 2010.
- May 9 – The Mexican government, along with Sedena, disarm all police forces in the state of Tamaulipas, beginning with the cities of Matamoros and Reynosa.
- May 14 – 2011 Durango massacres: In the state of Durango, 249 bodies were exhumed from numerous clandestine mass graves. Some sources, however, indicate that the actual body count reached 308 corpses.
- May 16 – In Guatemala, 27 farmers were killed by Los Zetas; the majority of the victims presented signs of torture and decapitation.
- May 20 – In Nuevo Laredo, directly across the border from Laredo, Texas, 31 people were killed in a 24-hour span. In addition, more than 40 people were injured, and 196 drug cartel gunmen were detained.
- May 27 – In Ruiz, Nayarit, a convoy from the Los Zetas ambushed and killed 29 gunmen of the Sinaloa Cartel.
  - A confrontation between the Federal Police forces and La Familia Michoacana in a ranch at Jilotlán de los Dolores, in western Jalisco, left 11 La Familia gunmen killed and 36 arrested. More than 70 assault rifles were confiscated, along with 14 handguns, 3 grenades, 578 cartridges, 20,000 rounds of ammunition, and 40 bullet-proof vests. It was later discovered that La Familia Michoacana was planning a raid against the Knights Templar.
- June 3 – In the state of Coahuila, 38 bodies were exhumed from clandestine mass graves.
- June 9 – The United States government arrested 127 U.S. Customs and Border Protection agents who were collaborating with the Mexican drug cartels.
- June 15 – A total of 34 people were killed in Monterrey, Nuevo León, in a 24-hour span.
- June 21 – José de Jesús Méndez Vargas 'El Chango', leader of La Familia Michoacana, was captured in Aguascalientes.
- July 1 – In Fresnillo, Zacatecas, during a confrontation between Los Zetas and the Mexican forces, 15 Zeta gunmen were killed, and 17 were arrested; SEMAR notified that 6 marines were wounded.
  - Zacateca's Attorney General, Arturo Nahle García, confirmed that in Fresnillo, more than 250 Los Zetas gunmen confronted elements of the Mexican Navy throughout the whole city.
- July 4 – Federal Police agents arrest Jesús Enrique Rejón Aguilar, one of the leaders and co-founders of the Los Zetas drug cartel.
- July 8 – In the city of Monterrey, Nuevo León, a group of gunmen shot and killed 27 people, injured 7, and kidnapped 8 in 'Bar Sabino Gordo.' Presumably, this massacre was from the Gulf Cartel to their rival group Los Zetas.
- July 9 – Fighting among Los Zetas and other drug cartels led to the deaths of more than 40 people whose bodies were found in three Mexican cities over a 24-hour span.
- July 9 – 2011 Matamoros mass kidnapping, 18 members of the Cázares family were kidnapped by affiliates of the Gulf Cartel from three different households in Matamoros, Tamaulipas.
- July 11 – Armando Villarreal Heredia, a U.S-born drug lieutenant of the Arellano-Felix drug cartel, is arrested by the Federal Police.
- July 12 – In Ciudad Juárez, 21 people were killed in different parts of the city by gunmen. This marked the deadliest day for Ciudad Juárez in 2011.
- July 14 – The Mexican Army discovers the largest marijuana plantation ever found in the country, 320 km (200 mi) south of San Diego, U.S., in the state of Baja California; consisting of 120 hectares (300 acres) that would have yielded about 120 tons, and was worth about US$160 million.
- July 15 – In Nuevo Laredo, Tamaulipas, 66 inmates escaped a federal prison during a massive brawl, where 7 other inmates were found dead.
- July 23 – President Felipe Calderón Hinojosa, and peace and human rights activists, which included the poet Javier Sicilia, gathered in Chapultepec Castle to initiate a national aired discussion on Mexico's drug war violence and on the country's military-led strategy against the drug cartels.
  - Due to anonymous calls by civilians, the Mexican Army carried out an operation to crack down on operatives from Los Zetas in Pánuco, Veracruz; when the Mexican forces arrived at the place, the gunmen received them with shots, but the Army repelled the aggression and killed 10 Zetas.
- July 24 – An unidentified group of gunmen disarmed 21 policemen in Michoacán. According to the information given, the gunmen carried out personal inspections to each police officer, disarming them one by one. The cops refused to defend themselves because the gunmen expressed high levels of anxiousness, and they were scared of being executed.
- July 25 – Inside a prison in Ciudad Juárez, 17 inmates were shot and killed during a brawl between rival drug groups.
- July 28 – Fortino Cortés Sandoval, the mayor of Florencia de Benito Juárez, Zacatecas, is found dead after a group of gunmen abducted him from his office.
- July 31 – The Federal Police forces of Mexico captured José Antonio Acosta Hernández, nicknamed "El Diego," supreme leader of La Linea, the armed wing of the Juárez Cartel. According to government sources, "El Diego" had ordered more than 1,500 executions, some of them including government officials.
- August 4 – The Secretariat of National Defense announced that after the initiation of the 'Operation Lince Norte', an operation focused primarily on destroying the financial and logistic sectors of Los Zetas, more than 500,000 pesos have been confiscated, and more than 30 'Zeta' gunmen killed.
- August 12 – Óscar García Montoya, alias ‘El Compayito’, supreme leader of the criminal group La Mano con Ojos, was captured. He confessed to have killed over 300 people by himself, and ordered the execution of 300 more.
- August 20 – In Torreón, a shooting was registered during a soccer match between Santos Laguna and Monarcas Morelia.
  - The mayor of Zacualpan, Mexico State, Jesús Eduviges Nava, was found dead after being kidnapped by gunmen who interrupted a meeting he was holding in his municipality.
- August 25 – 2011 Monterrey casino attack: a well-armed group of gunmen massacred 52 people, and injured over a dozen, at Casino Royale. Although not confirmed, some sources mention that 61 were killed in the attack. This attack was the most violent and bloodiest in the history of Monterrey and of the whole state of Nuevo Leon. According to eyewitnesses, the gunmen quietly stormed the casino and immediately opened fire at the civilians, and then doused the casino entrances with gasoline and started a fire that trapped the people inside.
- August 30 – In Acapulco, 140 elementary schools closed and over 600 teachers quit their jobs due to the money threats they have been receiving from the drug cartels. Over 75,000 kids are not attending school. One teacher confessed to have seen on a regular basis men in cars with assault rifles sticking out the windows, just outside school grounds.
- September 14 – In the small town of Juchipila in the state of Zacatecas, over 80 gunmen—presumably from the Gulf Cartel—took control of the town, its jail, and its city hall for over five hours. They said their goal was to wipe out any presence of Los Zetas in the area.
- September 20 – Two trucks containing 35 dead bodies are found in Boca del Río, Veracruz. Sources mention that all victims were linked to Los Zetas, and that the executions were performed by the Sinaloa Cartel's armed wing, Gente Nueva. Nevertheless, the criminal group Los Mata Zetas claimed responsibility for this massacre. In addition, 14 more bodies were found around Veracruz two days after this incident, summing up to 49 bodies found in public highways in the last forty-eight hours.
- October 4 – The federal government launches the military-led project called Operación Veracruz Seguro to ensure tranquility in Veracruz. Reports mention that Los Zetas, the Gulf Cartel, and the Sinaloa Cartel are present in that state.
- October 5 – In Culiacán, Sinaloa, Mexican authorities captured Noel Salgueiro Nevárez, the supreme leader of the Sinaloa Cartel's armed wing, Gente Nueva. They also captured Martín Rosales Magaña, one of the founders of La Familia Michoacana.
- October 6 – In Boca del Río, Veracruz, a total of 36 bodies were found by Mexican authorities in three houses. Eight alleged perpetrators of the recent killings in Veracruz have been caught, including the leader of the group Los Mata Zetas. Also, the Attorney General of Veracruz resigned from his position due to the increasing violence. A day after this incident, another 10 bodies were found across the state of Veracruz. The wave of violence has caused over 100 deaths in the past two weeks in Veracruz.
- October 14 – Carlos Oliva Castillo alias "La Rana," third-in-command in Los Zetas organization and the mastermind of the 2011 Monterrey casino attack where 52 were killed, was captured in northern city of Saltillo, Coahuila.
- November 11 – Francisco Blake Mora, Secretary of the Interior in the cabinet of Felipe Calderón, dies in a helicopter accident in foggy weather. Some sources speculate that his death was an assassination, though no concrete evidence suggests this.
- November 23 – A total of 23 bodies, 16 of them burned to death, were located in several abandoned vehicles in Sinaloa.
- November 24 – Three trucks containing 26 bodies were found in an avenue at Guadalajara, Jalisco. All of them were male corpses. Reports mention that Los Zetas and the Milenio Cartel are responsible for the massacre of these twenty-six alleged Sinaloa Cartel members.
- December 14 – A convoy of U.S. military members was seen crossing the U.S-Mexico border from Brownsville, Texas, into Matamoros, Tamaulipas. The U.S. soldiers were greeted by Mexican military officials at the international bridge, and were escorted to their meeting location south of Matamoros. Reports mention that the meeting between the two military units was to discuss “mutual security” concerns.
- December 25 – The Mexican army announced that it had captured Guzmán's head of security. The arrest took place in Culiacán, the Sinaloa state capital.

=== 2012 ===
- January 4 – In a prison brawl in Altamira, Tamaulipas, 31 inmates were killed. According to the witnesses, the brawl was between Gulf Cartel and Los Zetas.
- January 7 – Police in the northern city of Torreón found the severed heads of five people killed in a suspected outbreak of drug gang violence. Officials were still searching for the bodies. The heads were found in black bags in various parts of the city late on Friday, a spokesman for the ministry of public security in the state of Coahuila said on Saturday. Threatening messages were left with the severed heads – a common feature of killings by drug cartels in Mexico – that suggested the slayings were the result of feuding between local gangs, the spokesman said.
- February 2 – Two U.S. missionaries from a Baptist Church were killed in Santiago, Nuevo León, by drug cartel members.
- February 19 – In Apodaca, Nuevo Leon, 44 inmates were killed in a prison riot, presumably caused by a brawl between the Gulf Cartel and Los Zetas.
- March 19 – While conducting an investigation on the beheadings of ten other people, 12 policemen were ambushed and killed by gunmen in Teloloapan, Guerrero. Eleven other police officers were wounded.
- March 23 – Thirteen people were killed in a wave of drug violence that swept Mexico a day before the Pope's visit. Seven men were found shot on the side of the road in Angostura, Sinaloa, at a spot where locals often purchased contraband gasoline from the cartels. Four severed heads were found in an abandoned car in Acapulco. The body of a minor and a cab driver were also found in the town.
- March 27 – Ten people were reported killed in a shootout in Temosachi in the Mexican border state of Chihuahua, where the Sinaloa and Juarez cartels have been fighting for control over drug smuggling routes into the U.S.
- April 20 – Gunmen kill 16 people in a bar in the capital city of Chihuahua, Chihuahua. Two of those killed were journalists.
- May 1 – Armed confrontations between the Mexican military and cartel members in Choix, Sinaloa, left 27 people dead.
- May 4 – In Nuevo Laredo, Tamaulipas, 23 corpses—14 of them decapitated and 9 of them hanged from a bridge—were found early in the morning.
- May 9 – The chopped-up remains of 18 bodies were found inside two trucks near Chapala, Jalisco, just south of the city of Guadalajara.
- May 13 – The Cadereyta Jiménez massacre occurred on the Mexican Federal Highway 40. The decapitated and dismembered bodies of 49 people were found in Cadereyta Jiménez. The remains were left along the road in Nuevo León, between the cities of Monterrey and Reynosa. A message written on a wall nearby appeared to refer to Los Zetas drug cartel.
- June 4 – In the Mexican city of Torreón, Coahuila, gunmen killed 11 people at a rehabilitation clinic.
- August 12 – A total of 12 decomposing bodies are found inside an abandoned vehicle in Zacatecas.
- August 14 – Members of the Gulf Cartel storm a bar in Monterrey and kill 10 people.
- October 7 – Heriberto Lazcano Lazcano is killed by the Mexican Navy.
- December 19 – A failed prison break and subsequent brawl between inmates leaves at least 23 dead in Gómez Palacio, Durango.

=== 2013 ===
- January 3 – 12 alleged drug traffickers are killed by Mexican troops in La Estación, Zacatecas.
- January 15 – High-ranking Gulf Cartel leader El Metro 4 is assassinated in Tamaulipas state by alleged drug traffickers.
- January 20 – José Ángel Coronel Carrasco, cousin of Ignacio Coronel Villarreal and leader of the Sinaloa Cartel, is arrested in Culiacán by Mexican soldiers.
- January 28 – The bodies of eight members of the band Kombo Kolombia were found dead in Hidalgo, Nuevo León. Three days earlier, several unidentified gunmen kidnapped 20 members of the band after a concert in the same city.
- March 10 – Gulf Cartel forces led by Miguel "El Gringo" Villarreal and Mario Pelón Ramírez clash in Reynosa, leaving an unofficial death toll of 36 dead.
- March 24 – Humberto Rodríguez Coronel, regional cartel leader of Durango and nephew of Ignacio Coronel Villarreal, leader of the Sinaloa Cartel, is arrested by the Navy.
- April 13 – Sinaloa Cartel high-ranking leader Javier Torres Félix is deported to Mexico after serving jail sentence in the U.S.
- April 30 – Inés Coronel Barreras, the father-in-law of Joaquín El Chapo Guzmán, Mexico's most-wanted drug lord, is arrested.
- May 13 – Gulf Cartel high-ranking leader Aurelio Cano Flores is sentenced to 35 years in prison in the United States. He is the "highest ranking Gulf Cartel member to be convicted by a U.S. jury in the past 15 years."
- May 14 – Former U.S. Marine Armando Torres III is kidnapped by gunmen in the state of Tamaulipas and is not heard of since then.
- May 26 – In broad daylight at a bar in Zona Rosa neighborhood in Mexico City, 12 young people were kidnapped.
- June 6 – The Mexican Army rescues 165 kidnapped migrants from a safe house in Gustavo Díaz Ordaz, Tamaulipas.
- July 7 – Mexicans go to the polls to cast their votes in the local elections. The voting season, however, was among the most violent in the country's history, with several politicians threatened, beaten, kidnapped, and/or killed in less than a month.
- July 15 – Los Zetas leader Miguel Treviño Morales is arrested by the Mexican Navy in Nuevo Laredo, Tamaulipas.
- July 23 – Following six ambush attacks against the Mexican federal police in the state of Michoacán, 22 people were killed; two of them were law enforcement officials and the rest of them were alleged drug traffickers of the Knights Templar Cartel.
- July 29 – Vice Admiral Carlos Miguel Salazar Ramonet of the Mexican Navy is killed by alleged gunmen of the Knights Templar Cartel in Michoacán. His death was regarded as the highest-profile killing of a member of the Mexican Armed Forces in the ongoing conflict against organized crime.
- August 9 – Former Mexican drug lord Rafael Caro Quintero is released from prison after a tribunal determined that he was tried improperly. He was one of the founders of the extinct Guadalajara Cartel and was responsible for the murder of U.S. Agent Enrique Camarena in 1985.
- August 17 – Gulf Cartel leader Mario Ramírez Treviño, known by his aliases El Pelón and/or X-20, is arrested in a joint operation by the Mexican Army and Navy in Río Bravo, Tamaulipas.
- September 2 – Juárez Cartel leader Alberto Carrillo Fuentes, alias Betty la Fea (Ugly Betty), is arrested in Bucerías, Nayarit. He is the brother of the deceased drug lord Amado Carrillo Fuentes, former leader of the criminal organization until his death in 1997.
- September 23 – Alleged members of La Línea, a gang controlled by the Juárez Cartel, burst into a party and kill 10 people in Ciudad Juárez. All of them were shot dead as they celebrated the victory of a baseball game held hours earlier near the city.
- October 18 – Francisco Rafael Arellano Félix, former leader of the Tijuana Cartel, is killed in Los Cabos, Baja California Sur, by gunmen disguised as clowns.
- November 20 – DEA agents arrest Serafín Zambada Ortiz, son of Ismael "El Mayo" Zambada, one of the Sinaloa Cartel's top leaders, as he tried to cross the international border from Sonora into Arizona.
- December 1 – Mexican authorities unearth at least 67 corpses from clandestine mass graves in La Barca, Jalisco.
- December 6 – Following a massive excavation in the outskirts of Zapopan, Jalisco, Mexican authorities exhumed a total of 17 bodies.
- December 18 – High-ranking Sinaloa Cartel leader Gonzalo Inzunza Inzunza (alias "El Macho Prieto") is killed by Mexican authorities in the resort area of Puerto Peñasco, Sonora. During the raging firefight that resulted in his death, several of his gunmen took his body from the scene.
- December 31 – El Chino Ántrax, a founder and high-ranking leader of Los Ántrax, an armed squadron of the Sinaloa Cartel, is arrested in the Netherlands.

=== 2014 ===
- January 27 – Dionisio Loya Plancarte, one of the leaders of the Knights Templar Cartel, is arrested by Mexican security forces at his home in Morelia.
- February 19 – Mexican authorities discover clandestine mass graves with at least 30 corpses in Gómez Farías, Tamaulipas. They believe that Los Zetas may be responsible for the mass murder. Local residents believe that there were at least 80 bodies in the area.
- February 22 – Joaquin "El Chapo" Guzman, leader of the Sinaloa Cartel, is arrested in a hotel in Mazatlán by Mexican authorities.
- March 9 – Nazario Moreno González, leader of the Knights Templar Cartel, and former leader of La Familia Michoacana, is killed in a shootout with Mexican authorities. The government formerly claimed to have killed Moreno in December 2010 when he was head of La Familia Michoacana.
- March 31 – High-ranking Knights Templar Cartel leader Enrique Plancarte Solís is killed in a shootout with the Mexican Navy.
- May 11 – Galindo Mellado Cruz, one of the founders of Los Zetas, is killed in a shootout in Reynosa, Tamaulipas, with five other people.
- June 7 – Juan José Esparragoza Moreno, leader of the Sinaloa Cartel, reportedly died of a heart attack following an accident he had suffered days earlier, injuring his vertebral column in a car wreck. This source is not confirmed by Mexican authorities.
- June 20 – At least 31 corpses are exhumed from clandestine mass graves in Tres Valles, Veracruz. The ranch where the bodies were found was previously owned by the former mayor of the town.
- June 23 – Luis Fernando Sánchez Arellano, leader of the Tijuana Cartel, is arrested at a fast food restaurant in Tijuana while watching the FIFA World Cup game between Mexico and Croatia.
- June 30 – A shootout between Mexican security forces and alleged gang members leaves 22 dead in Tlatlaya, State of Mexico. The gunfight reportedly started after the suspected criminals opened fire at law enforcement who were patrolling the area.
- 27 September – 43 students disappeared in Iguala, Guerrero, after having been taken from the city by municipal police and handed over to the Guerreros Unidos criminal organization.
- October 1 – Héctor Beltrán Leyva, leader of the Beltrán-Leyva Cartel, is arrested with another man inside a restaurant in San Miguel de Allende, Guanajuato, by the Mexican Army.
- October 5 – At least 28 corpses are found in several clandestine mass graves in Iguala, Guerrero.

=== 2015 ===
- January 7 – In Chilapa, Guerrero, security forces discovered 10 bodies and 11 severed heads in six clandestine mass graves. Most of victims were tied up, and the corpses bore signs of torture. Authorities did not comment if the heads belonged to the corpses.
- March 20 – An ambush attack from a criminal group left 11 dead in Ocotlán, Jalisco. Five of them were members of the Federal Police gendarmerie, three suspects, and three uninvolved civilians. This was the deadliest attack on Mexico's new gendarmerie.
- April 6 – In San Sebastián del Oeste, Jalisco, gunmen ambushed and killed 15 police officers. Five more were wounded in the attack. It was the highest single mass killing against Mexico's police force since 2010.
- May 1 – In Jalisco state, a massive attack by cartels struck with blockades, fire stations burned, chopper down and resulting in at least 7 dead.
- May 3 – 11 rural workers from Sinaloa disappeared while on their way to Hermosillo, Sonora, for a summer-time work.
- May (between 9 and 14) – In Chilapa, Guerrero, 10 people went missing after armed men took over the town for several days. According to local residents, the armed men claimed to be community policemen and said they overran the town to protect residents from gang violence.
- May 22 – A shootout between alleged members of the Jalisco New Generation Cartel and the Federal Police left 43 dead in Tanhuato, Michoacán.
- July 12 – Joaquin "El Chapo" Guzmán escapes from the maximum security prison of Altiplano, for a second time in his career. He escaped through a 1.5 kilometre long tunnel under the shower in his cell, where the cameras could not follow him. The tunnel ended in a little village nearby, and El Chapo used a motorbike to get out fast. After his escape he was placed by Mexican authorities again on the top spot of most wanted men in the country, offering a US$3.5 million reward for whoever has information about his whereabouts.
- December 6 – Rogelio González Pizaña, a high ranked leader and founding member of Los Zetas, is murdered along with his family. The assassination was allegedly carried out by those working for the Gulf Cartel.

=== 2016 ===
- January 8 – Sinaloa Cartel leader Joaquín Guzmán is recaptured and 5 gunmen killed in raid codenamed Operation Black Swan in Los Mochis, Sinaloa.
- January 29 – 2 Sinaloa Cartel members killed, 22 arrested in joint Mexican-American Operation Diablo Express in Sonoyta, Sonora, and Lukeville, Arizona.
- March 14 – At least nine suspected cartel members died in gunfights with government forces during an anti-cartel operation in the city of Reynosa, Tamaulipas.
- May - Julio Cesar Olivas Felix alias "Abc" alleged cocaine trafficker considered one of the partners of "El Chapo" Guzmán at the Sinaloa Cartel was arrested in Malpensa Airport at Milan.

=== 2017 ===
- 20 January – Juan Pablo Pérez García (alias "El Oaxaco" and "Bravo 01") a senior leader of the enforcement wing of the Old School Zetas is arrested near the border of Nuevo León and Tamaulipas.
- 21, 22 January – A taxi in Manzanillo, Colima, is found to contain the decapitated bodies of 6 men and 1 woman on January 21. The taxi is covered in a narco message, which is rumored to have claimed responsibility on behalf of the Jalisco New Generation Cartel of CJNG and that the deceased where members of the Sinaloa Cartel. The following day on January 22 another five bodies are found, along with an additional narco message this time saying that the deceased where members of the CJNG and threatening more violence as an apparent reprisal for the previous days event. Just as with the seven deceased found in the taxi, the five deceased bodies found the following day also show signs of torture and decapitation.
- 8 October – Pedro Payán Gloria (alias "El Pifas") a member of Los Aztecas gang is sentenced to 430 years in prison. Payán Gloria along with several others was convicted of kidnapping and drugging 11 women between 2009 and 2012 in Ciudad Juárez, after which the women would be forced into prostitution and ultimately murdered by Payán Gloria and his gang.
- 11 October – Sajid Emilio Quintero Navidad (alias "El Cadete") is arrested at the San Ysidro Border Crossing by American marshals. Quintero Navidad is the cousin of Rafael Caro Quintero and was formally a high-ranking member of the Sinaloa Cartel, before switching to the Beltrán-Leyva Cartel in 2014, where he became in charge of drug trafficking in Sonora and across the American border. In addition to drug trafficking Quintero Navidad was wanted by Mexico for the murder of singer Tito Torbellino and in the United States for the murder of U.S. Drug Enforcement Administration Agent Enrique "Kiki" Camarena. He is one of the highest ranking cartel leaders to be arrested in the United States.
- 11 October – 17 inmates are killed and 37 injured in a riot at a prison in Cadereyta Jiménez, Nuevo León. The attack was allegedly instigated when inmates belonging to Los Zetas attempted to take over the prison, sparking a violent reaction by inmates belong to rival groups.
- 23 October – Sergio Meza Flores (alias "El Soruyo") a senior member of Los Zetas is killed in a confrontation with police in Tabasco. Meza Flores was wanted for extortion, fuel theft, and executions in Tabasco and Veracruz.
- 29 October – Julio César Escárcega Murillo (alias "El Tigre" and "El 109") is arrested along with his bodyguards in Cuauhtemoc, Chihuahua. Rifles, pistols, and a grenade launcher were found with the group. Escárcega Murillo was recently appointed Nuevo Cartel del Tigre after the death of its previous leader, and the group was suspected of multiple homicides area in addition to drug trafficking.
- 30 October – The bodies of 5 men and 1 woman are found dumped by the side of a federal highway four kilometers from Loma Bonita, Oaxaca. All 6 bodies show signs that they were tortured and executed. A note found by the bodies claims responsibly on behalf of the Jalisco New Generation Cartel. More than 40 bodies had been found the previous month in similar conditions in Veracruz.
- 19 November – U.S. border patrol agent Rogelio Martinez is killed and his colleague wounded in the border closest to the area of Van Horn, Texas.
- 25 November – Dismembered body parts are found in Poza Rica. The bodies show signs of torture and indicates the individuals were alive at the time of dismemberment, where they were decapitated and their limbs and torsos were cut up into multiple parts. Sicaros were caught by the police while in the process of laying out the bodies in a public space along with propaganda posters. Four of the perpetrators were cornered in their vehicle and killed in a shootout, however the others escaped.
- 26 November – 26 people are executed or murdered in various places in a three-day crime spree in Veracruz. The murder victims include Victor Manuel Espinoza Tolentino, mayor of Ixhuatlán de Madero, and his wife.
- 28 November – Two ice-coolers containing narco cartulina are found in different locations of Guadalajara. One of the coolers, left outside a TV station, contains two human heads. The cartulinas carry threats against the police chief and judge on behalf of the Jalisco New Generation Cartel.

=== 2018 ===
- 27 January – Operation by the Mexican navy kills four armed individuals in Reynosa. One of the people killed is suspected to be Humberto Steven Loza Méndez, aka Betito or Betillo, a senior commander in the Gulf Cartel. Loza Méndez's family latter confirms his identity.
- 29 January – Three individuals are arrested for planning and executing a massacre in San Nicolás, Nuevo León, a day before. The 3 stormed a house and shot 12 people while they were watching a football game, killing 9 and injuring 3. It is suspected the attack was in retaliation for drugs being sold at the house without permission from the local gang.
- 30 January – Eight individuals (6 men and 2 women) are found decapitated, dismembered, and dumped into plastic bags close to the Chilapa River.
- 31 January – The Mexico-Acapulco federal highway is shut down for several days due to violence. It is believed to have started when the UPOEG (a paramilitary group in Guerrero) kidnapped a suspected drug dealer who was part of Los Ardillos. In retaliation Los Ardillos murder four UPOEG members and burn their corpses. Five other people are injured; villagers are believed to have sided with the cartel against UPOEG as the heroin trade runs through the area.
- 9 February – José María Guízar Valencia (alias "Z-43") is arrested in the Roma neighborhood of Mexico City. Guízar Valencia was one of the new leaders of Los Zetas and had a $5m reward by the American government for drug trafficking. He is also suspected of ordering murders in Guatemala.
- 21 February – 21 people are injured, mostly tourists in a blast aboard a Tour Boat. A Narco Manta erected in Playa del Carmen on 27 February taking responsibility for the bombing as well as mocking and threatening the mayor.
- 12 June – 2018 Chimney Canyon shootout: a shootout between drug smugglers and U.S. border patrol occurs in a remote area near Arivaca, Arizona, close to the border.
- 30 July – José Guadalupe Rodríguez Castillo (alias 'El 15') is arrested by Mexican authorities. He is a leader in the Jalisco New Generation Cartel and wanted for the disappearance and presumed murder of 3 Italian businessmen in the Southern Jalisco town of Tecalitlán in January 2018.
- 11 September – 32 clandestine graves are discovered in the municipality of Alvarado in Veracruz. Up to 174 remains of people who were murdered and buried who were found in the graves by forensic scientists, who estimate the graves to be one to two years old. The deceased are believed to be the victims of the conflict between Los Zetas and Jalisco New Generation Cartel in the area.
- 28 September – Leonel Salgueiro, alias "El Cuate", is captured in Parral, Chihuahua. Salgueiro is suspected of being leader and drug trafficker of the Sinaloa Cartel.
- 30 September – Erick Samuel Deraz González, alias "Güero Canesten", is assassinated at a soccer field in Tijuana. He was the second in command for the Jalisco New Generation Cartel division in Tijuana, with the murder believed to be carried out by a rival cartel.
- 30 October – David Garcia, alias "El Pistache", is arrest along with two other after a gunfight in Santa Fe, Mexico City. Garcia was the leader of a drug and weapon smuggling cartel named La Unión Tepito.
- 27 November – David Velasquéz Ramírezm, alias "El Greñas", sometimes also known as "El Grandote", is arrested along with several other in Aguascalientes. Velasquéz is suspected of being the ringleader of a criminal group called "Los Aztecas", infamous for hiring themselves out as hitmen for cartels and suspected to have murdered several police chiefs and politicians.
- 2 December – At approximately 7:30 CST, 2 grenades were thrown at the American consulate in Guadalajara, with one of the grenades exploding and forming a 16-inch hole in the wall of the building. At the time of the bombing, the consulate was closed and no injuries were sustained. The Jalisco New Generation Cartel is suspected of the attack.
- 21 December – Carlos Díaz Meza (alias 'El 5') is assassinated by two armed men with assault rifles at his residence in Guachochi. Diaz was in command of several battalions of the Sinaloa Cartel, and is the brother of Melquiades Díaz Meza (alias 'El Chapo Calin'), a high-ranking commander of the same cartel. Authorities believe the assassination is due to a power struggle between two families in the area for control of the cartel and fear the event could lead to more violence.

=== 2019 ===
- 1 January – Alejandro Aparicio Santiago, the recently elected mayor of Tlaxiaco, is shot and killed just hours after being sworn in. On the same day María Ascención Torres Cruz, a local official is also murdered. Both politicians were of the MORENA party.
- 3 January – Four bodies are found on the outskirts of Fresnillo. The deceased died from gunshots wounds although all bodies showed signs of torture. In the preceding weeks two other bodies had been found in similar condition. While the perpetrator remains unknown, authorities believe it is highly likely that the murders came as a result of the recent violence between rival cartels for control of the Zacatecas drug trade.
- 6 January – Two gunmen with assault rifles kill 7 people at a bar in Playa del Carmen.
- 10 January – 19 bodies, many burned beyond recognition, are discovered in Tamaulipas near the border area. It is believed that the bodies belong to members of an organized crime group murdered and disposed of by rivals.
- 31 January – At the border checkpoint near Nogales, Arizona, in the United States, a truck coming from Mexico is stopped and found to be carrying 254 pounds of fentanyl under its load of cucumbers. This is the largest ever drug bust containing this specific kind of opioid, and the truck also contained 395 pounds of methamphetamine. The total value of the load is estimated to be more than 5 million US dollars.
- 1 February – 6 people are killed, and 4 hostages are freed when police confront the alleged kidnappers. 2 of the dead are believed to be citizens killed in the crossfire. 12 of the alleged kidnappers escape, the incident is believed to be linked to organized crime.
- 12 February – Joaquín "El Chapo" Guzmán is found guilty in American court on all 10 counts; the charges include engaging in a continuing criminal enterprise, conspiracy to launder narcotics proceeds, international distribution of cocaine, heroin, marijuana and other drugs, and illegal use and distribution of fire arms.
- 15 February – Members of the Northeast Cartel record and post on social media the interrogation and decapitation of two suspected members of the Gulf cartels. The heads, rest of the remains are found in Escobedo, Nuevo León, along with a narco message. The discovery follows a trend of decapitations as two heads were discovered in a sack in Ciénega de Flores three days before, with other severed heads left in public spaces, often close to prisons, in the state of Nuevo León in the previous weeks.
- 17 April - Mario Estrada, a presidential candidate in the 2019 Guatemalan general election, is captured in the United States because of his alleged connections with the Sinaloa Cartel. The United States Department of Justice says in a statement that Estrada had requested the murder of political rivals to win the presidency in exchange for granting control of airports and sea ports in Guatemala to the Sinaloa Cartel. The presidential and parliamentary elections are scheduled for June 16.
- 16 June - Police fire at a helicopter in Sultepec, killing the pilot and injuring three women under the mistaken belief that a cartel member was on board.
- 4 July - Juan Ulises Galván Carmona, alias “El Buda”, was killed by two hitmen in a convenience store in Chetumal, the capital of Quintana Roo, along Mexico's Caribbean coast. El Buda served as the leader of the Sinaloa Cartel's drug trafficking activities and shipments from Central and South America.
- 9 August - Nine bodies are found hanging from a bridge and two other locations in the city of Uruapan in the state of Michoacán. The killings are believed to be perpetrated by the Jalisco New Generation Cartel due to a banner found on the bridge baring the group's initial's and a threat to a rival cartel. By the end of the week a total of 20 bodies had been discovered.
- 12 August - In two separate operations the Mexican Marines seize 2.1 tons of cocaine, and the Mexican army confiscates another 450 kilos in operations of the coast of Chiapas.
- 13 August - Roberto Domínguez Trejo, better known as “Beto Trejo”, the lead singer of a narcocorrido band called "Los Hijos del Cartel" (sons of the cartel) is assassinated in his car while at a gas station in Tijuana. His wife and child were also in the car but unharmed.
- 15 August - in two separate incidents the U.S. Coast Guard seize more than 6,700 pounds of cocaine in two separate incidents near Pascagoula, Mississippi. The seized content had a value of $89 million dollars.
- 28 August - At least 25 people have been killed while 11 others are injured in a bar fire in Coatzacoalcos in the state of Veracruz. Mexican police announced that the fire was intentionally set by cartel members who also blocked the exits.
- 14 September - Claudia Ochoa Félix reputed by the authorities, the leader of the murder squad Los Ántrax by the personal relation with the founder José Rodrigo Aréchiga Gamboa alias "El Chino Ántrax" was found dead in her private residence in Culiacán due to apparent pulmonary aspiration caused by a drug overdose.
- 23 September - Ramon Cristobal Santoyo alias "Dr. Wagner" alleged cocaine trafficker considered one of the partners of "El Chapo" Guzmán at the Sinaloa Cartel was arrested at Rome's Fiumicino airport on August 20.
- 28 September - Carlos "N." alias "El Chicken" was captured by the Mexican authorities in Zapopan, partner of Gonzalo Mendoza alias "El Sapo" boss of the occidental region of Jalisco and important figure of the Jalisco New Generation Cartel.
- 14 October - Fourteen state police officers are killed in an ambush in Aguililla, Michoacán; crime-scene evidence points to the involvement of the Jalisco New Generation Cartel.
- 18 October – Battle of Culiacán: The Mexican National Guard arrests Ovidio Guzmán López, alias "El Raton", a son of former Sinaloa Cartel leader Joaquín "El Chapo" Guzmán, in Culiacán. He, however, was released shortly later as government forces come under intense attack and are overpowered by Sinaloa Cartel gunmen, according to Security Minister Alfonso Durazo.
- 4 November - 2019 Sonora massacre: Nine members of a Mormon family, including six children, were killed by gunmen in Sonora.
- 1 December – 2019 Villa Unión shootout: In clashes and shootouts between Mexican police and suspected cartel members in the northern town Villa Unión, Coahuila, at least 21 people are killed.

== 2020-present ==
=== 2020 ===
- 8 January – 41 homicides are reported in the first 8 days of the year in the city of Tijuana, with the majority being linked to cartel violence and organized crime. At the same time over 100 are reported to have died from drug-related violence in the state of Guanajuato in the first week of 2020.
- 30 January – The U.S. Customs and Border Protection releases a report that in August it discovered a smuggling tunnel measuring 1,313 meters or 4,309 feet running from Tijuana to San Diego, making it the longest drug smuggling tunnel ever discovered along the Mexico–United States border.
- 30 January – In his morning press conference, President Andrés Manuel López Obrador declared the war had ended on January 30, 2020.
- 4 February – Gunmen open fire in an amusement arcade in Uruapan, Michoacán, killing at least nine people, including three children. Police say the gunmen were searching for specific targets but then opened fire indiscriminately on customers. The previous weekend 11 bodies had been discovered in clandestine graves. The killings are believed to be related to the ongoing war for territory between the Jalisco and Viagras drug cartels, or as retaliation for the arrest of a senior cartel commander in the area.
- 21 February – Mexico extradites Rubén Oseguera González (alias "El Menchito"), the son leader of the Jalisco New Generation Cartel of Nemesio Oseguera Cervantes (alias "El Mencho"), to the United States to face drug charges.
- 3 April – 19 people are killed in a shootout between rival cartels in Madera, Chihuahua. Local media reports the violence was part of a conflict over turf by the Juarez Cartel and the rival Sinaloa Cartel.
- 15 May ― On 9 May, José Rodrigo Aréchiga Gamboa alias "El Chino Ántrax" was reported missing; his body was found with gunshot wounds in a black SUV the next day in Culiacán alongside his sister and brother-in-law.
- 26 June – Omar García Harfuch, Mexico City's chief of police, is wounded but survives an assassination attempt that also resulted in the death of two of his bodyguards and a 26-year-old bystander. The attack took place in the affluent Lomas de Chapultepec neighborhood and has been alleged to have been orchestrated by the Jalisco New Generation Cartel.
- 1 July – Gunmen storm a drug rehabilitation facility in the central city of Irapuato, Guanajuato, killing at least 24 people, according to a federal official.
- 3 July – Mexican Army troops kill 12 drug cartel gunmen in Nuevo Laredo, Tamaulipas. In separate incidents, police kill five attackers in Torreón, Coahuila, and five police officers are shot dead in Guanajuato.
- 2 August – State officials in Guanajuato announce that Mexican security forces have arrested José Antonio Yépez Ortiz (alias "El Marro" or "The Sledgehammer") alongside five others. Yepes was the former leader of the Santa Rosa de Lima Cartel and was one of Mexico's most wanted criminals.
- 16 October – Former defense secretary of Mexico Salvador Cienfuegos Zepeda is arrested by the DEA at Los Angeles International Airport on drug trafficking and money laundering charges.
- 29 October – Acting on a tip, authorities in the state of Guanajuato find a mass grave containing the remains of 59 people. Most of the deceased are thought to be adolescents or young adults, and it is believed they were victims of a turf war between cartels.
- 18 December – Former governor of Jalisco Aristóteles Sandoval is shot dead in a restaurant bathroom in Puerto Vallarta. One of his 15-strong security detail was seriously injured in a subsequent gun battle.

=== 2021 ===
- 25 January – The remains of 19 individuals are discovered in two vehicles in the state of Tamaulipas near the border with the United States. The victims, presumed to be undocumented migrants, were shot and then set on fire.
- 18 March – Gunmen ambush a police convoy in Coatepec Harinas, State of Mexico, killing eight police officers and five prosecution investigators. It is the deadliest attack on law enforcement in the country since October 2019. The National Guard has been deployed to search for the killers.
- 28 April – The city of Aguililla, Michoacán, is taken over by Jalisco New Generation Cartel.
- 14 May – 2 soldiers killed during a fight against Jalisco New Generation Cartel close to Aguililla.
- 14 May – Shootout between Jalisco New Generation Cartel and Mexican Armed Forces; 2 soldiers killed and 2 wounded on Jilotlán-Tepalcatepec highway.
- 16 November - Wife and alleged financier of Nemesio Oseguera's CJNG captured by the Mexican Army in Zapopan, Jalisco.

=== 2022 ===
- 18 August – López Obrador's government publishes a truth commission report about the 2014 Iguala mass kidnapping saying disappearance of 43 students had been a "crime of the state," in which drug traffickers working with federal police and military had killed students citing as key evidence 467 screenshots of messages purportedly sent by criminals and officials.
- 31 October – inquiry into the 2014 Iguala mass kidnapping continues to collapse as government's key evidence could not be verified.

=== 2023 ===
- 1 January – 2023 Ciudad Juárez prison attack: Ten prison officers and four inmates are killed in an armed attack on a prison in Ciudad Juárez, Chihuahua, in which 24 prisoners escape.
- 3 January – Five gunmen and two members of the security forces are killed during a shootout while searching for 30 inmates who escaped two days earlier during an armed attack on a prison in Ciudad Juárez, Chihuahua.
- 5 January – 2023 Sinaloa unrest: Ovidio Guzmán López, the son of Joaquín "El Chapo" Guzmán, is arrested in Culiacán, Sinaloa; fighting consequently breaks out between the Sinaloa cartel and the Mexican army.
- 26 February – Nuevo Laredo military shooting: Soldiers open fire on a pickup truck carrying unarmed civilians in Nuevo Laredo, Tamaulipas, killing five people, sparking protests and riots by local people.
- 15 April – At least seven people are killed and another is injured during a mass shooting in La Palma resort in Cortazar, Guanajuato.
- 10 May – Four people are killed during clashes at the Pharr–Reynosa International Bridge, on the Mexico–United States border, between police and suspected cartel members.
- 20 May – Ensenada shootout: Gunmen open fire during a car racing show in Ensenada, Baja California, killing ten people and injuring nine others.
- 1 June – Authorities find 45 bags containing human remains in Jalisco after seven people were reported missing in the state last week.
- 27 June – Fourteen police employees are kidnapped by armed men in Chiapas while travelling on the Federal Highway 190 between Ocozocoautla and Tuxtla Gutiérrez.
- 11 July – Suspected cartel members set off bombs targeting police officers in Tlajomulco de Zúñiga, Jalisco, killing six people (four officers and two civilians) and injuring 12 others.
- 28 August – The government says that it has deployed 1,200 more troops to the state of Michoacán after reports of drug cartel violence over the weekend.
- 7 September – Six civilians are shot dead on a fronton court near the downtown of Guadalupe, Zacatecas. Hours later other armed attacks leave two more people dead.
- 16 September – Ovidio Guzmán López is extradited from Mexico to the United States on drug trafficking and money laundering charges.
- 27 September – Authorities in the state of Nuevo León find at least twelve bodies dumped on roads near Monterrey, likely related to a drug cartel operating in Tamaulipas.
- 28 September – Six teenagers who were kidnapped by a group of armed men a few days ago are found dead near Villanueva, Zacatecas.
- 30 September – Two Morena party pollsters are killed and a third is kidnapped in Juárez, Chiapas. A note was left on the bodies from the Jalisco New Generation Cartel, threatening the government.
- 23 October – At least 24 people, including twelve police officers, are killed in three separate mass shootings and ambushes by unidentified assailants in Coyuca de Benítez, Guerrero, and Tacámbaro, Michoacán.
- 20 November – A shootout between Federal Police and armed civilians in Cuernavaca, Morelos, kills nine people, including two police officers.
- 24 November – The security chief for the Sinaloa Cartel, Néstor Isidro Pérez Salas, is arrested in Culiacán, Sinaloa. The U.S. Drug Enforcement Administration had a US$3 million bounty for his arrest.
- 12 December – Six people are killed in a shootout between cartel gunmen in Boquilla del Carmen, Zacatecas. Police and soldiers also find two people wounded, as well as one armed suspect and guns and a grenade.
- 13 December – Six people are killed and two others are injured in a shootout between rival drug cartels in Villanueva, Zacatecas. After the encounter, authorities arrest a suspect and decommission five assault rifles, grenades and ammunition.
- 17 December – Salvatierra massacre: Twelve people are killed during a mass shooting at a Christmas season party in Salvatierra, Guanajuato. Three others are killed and four injured at a bar in Tulum, Quintana Roo, while four people are killed in Salamanca, Guanajuato.
- 28 December – La Familia Michoacana kidnaps 14 people from Texcaltitlán, state of Mexico, in retaliation for a previous incident in which 10 cartel members were killed by residents of the town.
- 29 December – 2023 Ciudad Obregón shooting: Six people are killed and 26 others are injured in a mass shooting at a party in Ciudad Obregón, Sonora. The shooting's target, a cartel member, is among those killed.

=== 2024 ===
- 14 May – 11 people belonging to the same family were killed in a mass shooting in Chicomuselo, in the state of Chiapas, near the border with Guatemala. The area is a trafficking route where the Sinaloa cartel and the Jalisco New Generation cartel are engaged in a turf war.
- 28 June - 19 members of the Jalisco New Generation Cartel were killed by members of the Sinaloa Cartel in La Concordia, Chiapas.
- 25 July – Ismael "El Mayo" Zambada, leader of the Sinaloa Cartel, and Joaquín Guzmán López, son of Joaquín "El Chapo" Guzmán, were arrested by US Federal Agents shortly after landing at a private airfield outside El Paso, Texas.
- 20 September – Infighting in the Sinaloa Cartel:– Clashes between rival factions of Sinaloa Cartel resulted in 53 deaths, while 51 people are still listed as missing. Clashes started on 9 September between the two main factions known as the El Chapitos and the El Mayos. As a result, schools in Culiacán were shut down and some restaurants and shops closed early.
- 9 November – A mass shooting at a bar in Querétaro leaves at least ten people dead and thirteen injured. Authorities attributed the attack to the Santa Rosa de Lima Cartel, amid territorial disputes with rival criminal groups.
- 19 November – El Mencho's son-in-law, Cristian Fernando Gutierrez-Ochoa, a high ranking CJNG leader, is arrested in Riverside, California after faking his own death while living in the United States under a false identity.
- 22 November – Seven high-ranking officials from the State of Mexico are simultaneously arrested during Operation Enjambre for alleged links to organized crime, including several municipal public security commanders and the mayor of Amanalco.

=== 2025 ===
- 4 February – A series of shootouts and encounters are reported in Nuevo Laredo, Tamaulipas, Mexico, after the arrest of the regional leader of the Cártel del Noreste and leader of an armed wing in the state. The United States Consulate in Mexico issues an alert for its citizens to not go out on the streets, and the Nuevo Laredo International Airport suspends activities due to the violence.
- 19 February – The United States formally designates the Sinaloa Cartel, Jalisco New Generation Cartel, Cárteles Unidos, Northeast Cartel, Gulf Cartel, and La Nueva Familia Michoacana as terrorist organizations.
- 27 February – Mexico extradites 29 cartel members to the United States. High-profile extraditions included Rafael Caro Quintero, Miguel Treviño Morales, Omar Treviño Morales, Vicente Carrillo Fuentes, and Jose Rodolfo Villarreal-Hernandez.
- 5 March – An extermination camp operated by the Jalisco New Generation Cartel was discovered in Teuchitlán, Jalisco.
- 29 April – Alejandro Gertz Manero, Attorney General of Mexico, concluded that the Izaguirre Ranch was used by the Jalisco New Generation Cartel as a recruitment camp between 2021 and 2024, but found no evidence that it served as an extermination site.
- 3 May – José Murguía Santiago, the mayor of Teuchitlán, was arrested on charges of organized crime and forced disappearance, with the Attorney General's Office alleging that he was aware of the Izaguirre Ranch's existence, received monthly payments of MX$70,000, and used municipal resources to assist in the ranch's operation.
- 6 May – Five gunmen are killed and six vehicles burned, after an encounter between Cártel del Noreste and Jalisco New Generation Cartel, which took place in Rayones, Nuevo León, México.
- 20 May – Seven people are killed, including minors, in a mass shooting by Santa Rosa de Lima Cartel gunmen in San Felipe, Guanajuato, Mexico.
- 30 May – Nine alleged members of the Los Metros drug cartel are arrested by Mexican law enforcement on suspicion of the abduction and murder of the musical group Grupo Fugitivo who disappeared in Reynosa, Tamaulipas.
- 2 June – Five police officers are killed after an ambush in a highway in the border municipality of Frontera Comalapa. Hours later, an attacker was arrested and authorities confirmed that the attack was a retaliation for the recent arrest of Aler Baldomero Samayoa Recinos, also known as “Chicharra,” leader of Los Huistas, a Guatemalan criminal group that established ties with both the Sinaloa Cartel and the CJNG.
- 9 June – The U.S. Treasury Department imposes sanctions on Iván Archivaldo Guzmán Salazar and his brother Jesús Alfredo Guzmán Salazar, El Chapo's sons who are believed to be in Mexico and leading factions of the Sinaloa Cartel.
- 12 August – Mexico extradites 26 cartel members to the United States. High-profile extraditions included Abigael González Valencia and Roberto Salazar.
- 12 September – Following a months-long international manhunt, Paraguayan anti-drug agents arrest Hernán Bermúdez Requena, the former Tabasco Secretary of Security and alleged leader of the criminal organization "La Barredora", in Mariano Roque Alonso, near Asunción, Paraguay. Bermúdez Requena had reportedly fled Mexico on 26 January; an Interpol Red Notice was issued for his arrest on 17 July.
- 17 September – Bermúdez Requena is expelled from Paraguay, flown back to Mexico, and transferred to the Altiplano maximum-security prison to face charges of organized crime and forced disappearance.
- 1 November – Carlos Manzo, mayor of Uruapan, Michoacán, is assassinated by a teenage hitman during a Day of the Dead festival in a plot allegedly orchestrated by the Jalisco New Generation Cartel. The assassin is restrained and executed at the scene by one of the mayor's bodyguards.

=== 2026 ===
- 13 January – Authorities in Mexico City arrest six alleged members of the Tren de Aragua on charges including drug trafficking, extortion, and human trafficking.
- 20 January – Mexico extradites 37 cartel members to the United States. High-profile extraditions included Pedro Inzunza Noriega of the Sinaloa Cartel, Ricardo González Sauceda of the Northeast Cartel, former Knights Templar Cartel leader Servando Gómez Martínez, and Armando Gómez Núñez, head of an armed wing of the Jalisco New Generation Cartel.
- 19 February – Mexican authorities seize nearly four tonnes of cocaine from a semi-submersible vessel intercepted in the Pacific Ocean approximately 250 nautical miles south of Manzanillo, Colima, and arrest three suspects.
- 22 February – Rubén Nemesio Oseguera “El Mencho” Cervantes, leader of the Jalisco New Generation Cartel, is killed in a security operation conducted by the Mexican Army, causing nationwide unrest and violence. Hugo César "El Tuli" Macías Ureña, identified as one of the orchestrators behind the retaliations, is fatally shot while he worked to escape from his attempted arrest.
- 19 March – A raid kills eleven members of the Sinaloa Cartel in Sinaloa, with a senior cartel leader being captured along with many weapons.
- 27 April – Mexican federal forces arrest Audias "El Jardinero" Flores Silva, a senior leader of the Jalisco New Generation Cartel, in Nayarit; he was captured after attempting to hide in a drainage conduit while protected by heavily armed escorts. Authorities separately detain Flores' financial operator, known as "El Güero Contra", in Jalisco.
- 29 April – The United States charges Rubén Rocha Moya, the current governor of Sinaloa, Mexico, and nine other current and former politicians, with alleged drug and weapons trafficking charges and allegedly working with Mexican cartels, including Los Chapitos, a faction of the Sinaloa Cartel.

== See also ==
- List of politicians killed in the Mexican drug war
- List of massacres in Mexico
- List of Mexican cartels
