= Operation Sinaloa =

Mexican anti-drug trafficking operation

- Part of Mexican drug war
Date	2008–present
Location	Sinaloa, Mexico
Result	Ongoing

Belligerents
Mexico; Mexican Army; Mexican Marines Mexico National Guard (Since 2019)	Sinaloa Cartel	Beltrán-Leyva Cartel; Los Zetas

Commanders and leaders
(Mexico) Andrés Manuel López Obrador (2018–2024) (Mexico) Enrique Peña Nieto (2012–18) (Mexico) Felipe Calderón (2008–12) (Mexico) Guillermo Galván Galván (2008–12) (Mexico) Salvador Cienfuegos Zepeda (2012–18) (Mexico) Luis Cresencio Sandoval (2018–present) (Mexico) Mariano Francisco Saynez Mendoza (2008–12) (Mexico) Vidal Francisco Soberón Sanz (2012–18) (Mexico) José Rafael Ojeda Durán (2018–present) (Sinaloa) Jesús Aguilar Padilla (2008–2012) (Sinaloa) Mario López Valdez (2011–2016) (Sinaloa) Quirino Ordaz Coppel (2017–present)	Joaquín Guzmán Loera (POW); Ismael Zambada García; Ignacio Coronel Villarreal †	Héctor Beltrán Leyva (POW); Edgar Valdez Villarreal (POW); Sergio Villarreal Barragán (POW)

Operation Sinaloa or Operation Culiacan - Navolato (Spanish: Operacion Sinaloa/Operacion Conjunto Sinaloa) is an ongoing anti-drug trafficking operation in the Mexican state of Sinaloa by the Federal Police and the Mexican Armed Forces. Its main objective is to cripple all cartel organizations such as the Sinaloa Cartel, Beltrán-Leyva Cartel and Los Zetas that operate in that state. The Military was deployed in response to the murder of Mexico's Federal Police commissioner Édgar Eusebio Millán Gómez.

== Background ==
President Felipe Calderón's government ordered massive raids on drug cartels upon assuming office in December 2006 in response to an increasingly deadly spate of violence in his home state of Michoacán. The decision to intensify drug enforcement operations has led to an ongoing conflict between the federal government and the Mexican drug cartels. Sinaloa is home to the Sinaloa cartel and Beltrán-Leyva Cartel who are at war with each other since their break in 2008 due to the arrest of Alfredo Beltrán Leyva (a.k.a. El Mochomo, "The Desert Ant") on January 20, 2008. Beltrán Leyva's arrest was a huge blow to the Sinaloa Cartel, as he allegedly oversaw large-scale drug-smuggling operations and was a key money launderer for the cartel.

In apparent revenge for the arrest of his brother Alfredo, Arturo Beltrán Leyva ordered the assassination of the commissioner of the Federal Police, Édgar Eusebio Millán Gómez and other top federal officials in the Mexican capital. One group of these hitmen was captured in a Mexico City house with dozens of assault rifles, pistols, grenade launchers, 30 hand grenades, and bullet-proof jackets bearing the legend FEDA — the Spanish acronym for 'Special Forces of Arturo'. Apparently, the Beltrán Leyva brothers blamed their boss Joaquin "Chapo" Guzmán for their brother's arrest, and ordered the assassination of Guzmán's son, 22-year-old Édgar Guzmán López, which was carried out in a shopping center parking lot by at least 15 gunmen using assault rifles and grenade launchers.

== 2008 ==
- January 3 - Mexican military and police personnel discover 252.7 kilos of cocaine inside freight containers on board a ship in the port of Mazatlán.
- May 11, 2008 - Alfonso Gutiérrez Loera cousin of Joaquín "El Chapo" Guzmán Loera and 5 other drug traffickers were arrested after a shootout with Federal Police officers in Culiacán, Sinaloa. Along with the captured suspects, 16 assault rifles, 3 grenades, 102 magazines and 3,543 ammunition rounds were seized.
- May 13 - Secretary of the Interior Juan Camilo Mouriño announces the launch of Operation Sinaloa by deploying 3,000 Army and Federal Police troops to Sinaloa. That day, 300 Mexican troops in a 50 vehicle convoy arrived in the city of Navolato.
- May 22 - In Culiacán, Sinaloa, acting on an citizen's complaint that armed men were present inside a household in Culiacán's Colonia Guadalupe. Mexican troops from the 24th Motorized Cavalry Regiment and 94th Infantry Battalion raided the household and seized $6 million, 13,831 rounds of ammunition, and 16 magazines but no suspects were apprehended.
- May 24 - Mexican Naval air and ground units intercepted two small boats carrying 3 tons of marijuana and close to 2 kilos of marijuana seeds in Altata, Sinaloa.
- May 27 - Mexican marines and Federal Police forces conducted a search raid on two houses in Navolato. Marine and Police personnel discovered and seized three assault rifles, 2 rifle magazines and 33 cartridges. 3 trucks were also seized, inside two of them various packages of marijuana was discovered.
- June 5 - Mexican marines locate and destroy 1,200 marijuana plants inside a plantation outside the town of El Naranjo. Also, in another part of the state 3 individuals were arrested at a military checkpoint. They were in possession of 400 grams of crystal meth, 3 packages of marijuana with a weight of 400 kilos, 2 assault rifles and two trucks.
- June 9 - Due to a maritime and aerial patrol, Mexican naval units seized two small boats carrying 4 tons of marijuana. Days later, The Mexican Navy incinerated the seized marijuana.

== 2009 ==
- February 18 - Mexican Marines discover 21 grams of cocaine hidden inside the tires of a pick up truck that was stopped for inspection in Mazatlán.
- March 19 - The Mexican Military captures alleged Sinaloa cartel drug boss Vicente Zambada Niebla, son of drug lord Ismael Zambada García El Mayo.
- June 12 - Mexican marines locate and seized a drug laboratory filled with 50 thousand liters of liquid Ephedrine 46 kilometers north of Culiacán.
- October 12 - With the help of a U.S. Navy ship, Mexican Naval personnel intercepted the ship vessel "FIONA" of the coast of Clarion Island. 4 individuals and 500 kilos of cocaine were seized.

== 2010 ==
- January 2 - Carlos Beltrán Leyva, brother of Marcos Arturo Beltrán-Leyva was arrested by Federal Police officers in Culiacán, Sinaloa.
- March 31 – In various parts around Culiacán, troops from the 9th military zone seized 7 kilos 200 grams of crystal that was found inside the compartment of a truck, a clandestine laboratory for producing synthetic drugs with 65 liters of methamphetamine, 30 assault rifles, 23 magazines, one vehicle and $30 thousand.
- April 30 – For two days, SIEDO agents supported by hundreds of marines initiated various household raids in Mazatlán. Two individuals were arrested.
- May 1 – In Cualiacan, Sinaloa, a Municipal Police commander was ambushed and shot dead in his patrol vehicle in the Colonia of Ferrocarrilera.
  - In Los Mochis, government officials announced that 500 Federal Police officers would be deployed in the municipality of Ahome to reinforce the municipal police. Less than 150 of those officers will be sent to Los Mochis.
