= List of gangs in Mexico =

Mexican criminal groups or organizations

This is a list of gangs in Mexico. Many larger gangs can be classified as drug cartels.

== List of active gangs ==
Notable criminally-active gangs in Mexico include:

- 14K Triad
- 18th Street Gang, a.k.a. Mara 18
- Barrio Azteca, a.k.a. Los Aztecas
- Caborca Cartel
- Cártel de Tláhuac
- Cártel del Noreste
- Fuerza Anti-Unión
- Guerreros Unidos
- Gulf Cartel
  - Los Cabos
  - Los Ciclones
  - Los Metros
- Hells Angels MC
- Independent Cartel of Acapulco
- Individualistas Tendiendo a lo Salvaje
- Israeli mafia
- Jalisco New Generation Cartel, a.k.a. CJNG
  - Grupo Delta
  - Grupo Elite
  - Grupo Guerrero
  - Grupo X
  - Los Balcanes
- Juárez Cartel, a.k.a. Vicente Carrillo Fuentes Organization
  - La Línea
- La Familia Michoacana
- La Nueva Familia Michoacana Organization
  - Los Blancos de Troya
  - Los Viagras, a.k.a. Los Sierra
- La Barredora
- La Unión Tepito
- Los Mazatlecos
- Los Mexicles
- Los Ninis
- Los Pelones
- Los Rojos Cartel
- Los Talibanes, a.k.a. Los Nortes
- Los Zetas, a.k.a. Cártel de Los Zetas
- Mongols MC
- MS-13, a.k.a. Mara Salvatrucha
- 'Ndrangheta
- Norteños
- Nuestra Familia
- Nueva Plaza Cartel
- Paisas
- Pueblos Unidos
- Sangre Nueva Zeta
- Santa Rosa de Lima Cartel
- Sinaloa Cartel, a.k.a. Pacific Cartel
  - Artistas Asesinos
  - Gente Nueva, a.k.a. Los Chapos
  - Los Ántrax
- Solo Ángeles CM, a.k.a. Solo Angels MC
- South Pacific Cartel
- Tijuana Cartel
- Vagos MC
- Zetas Vieja Escuela

== Inactive criminal organizations ==
- Beltrán-Leyva Organization, a.k.a. Cártel de los Beltrán-Leyva (1996–2017)
- Colima Cartel
- Guadalajara Cartel
- Independent Cartel of Acapulco
- Knights Templar Cartel
- Los Narcosatánicos
- Los Negros
- Milenio Cartel, a.k.a. Cártel de los Valencia
- Oaxaca Cartel, a.k.a. Díaz-Parada Cartel
- Sonora Cartel, a.k.a. Caro Quintero Organization

== See also ==
- List of Mexican drug cartel figures
- List of gangs in the United States
- Gangs in Australia
- Gangs in Canada
- Gangs in the United Kingdom
- Gangs in New Zealand
