= List of Mexican drug cartel figures =

Mexican cartel headquarters

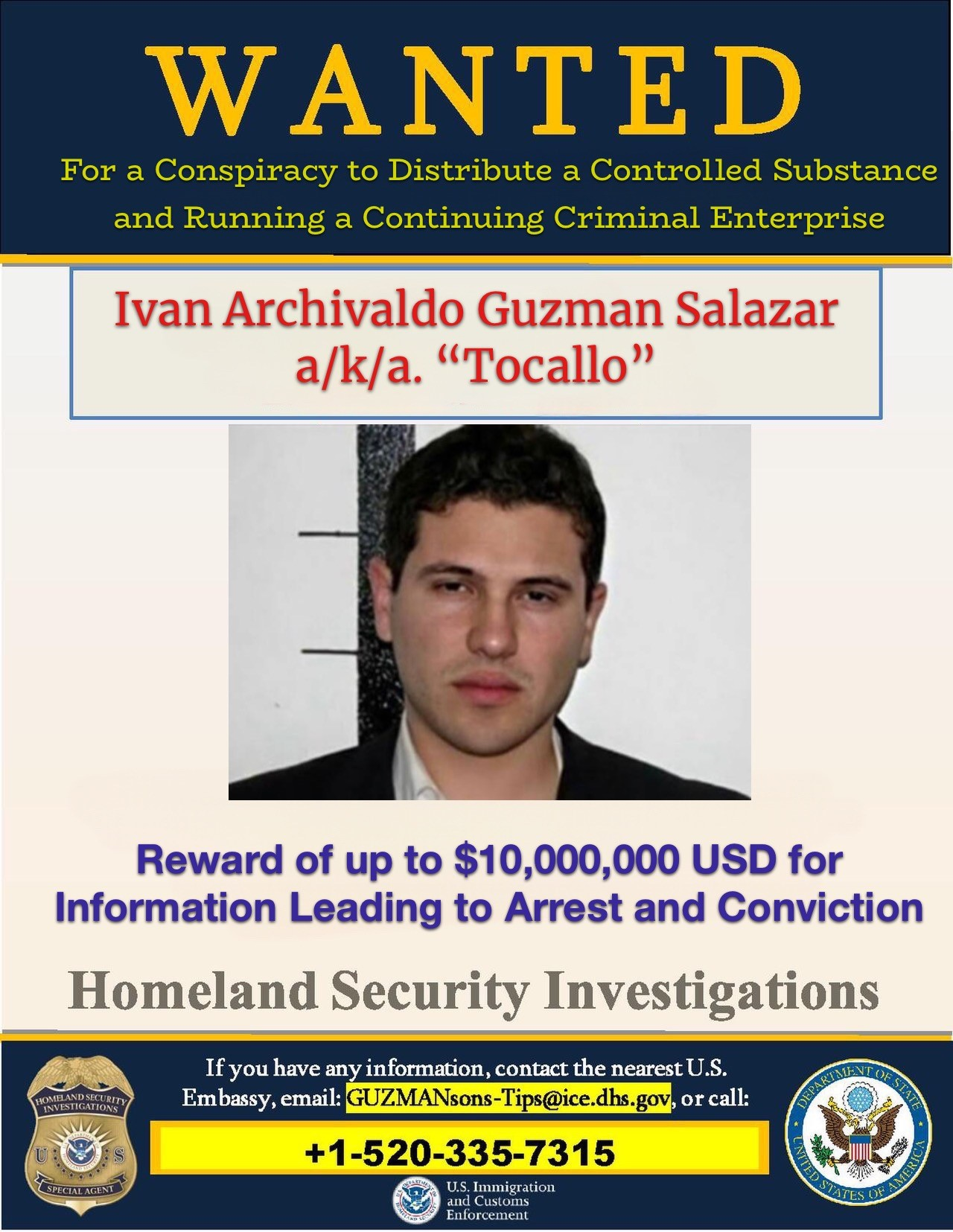
El Chapito wanted poster

This is a list of Mexican drug cartel figures or gang members that are fugitives, incarcerated members, or deceased cartel leaders.

== Cartel fugitives ==
- Jesús Alfredo Guzmán Salazar
- Iván Archivaldo Guzmán Salazar (El Chapito)

== Notable figures ==
=== Incarcerated ===
- Abigael González Valencia
- Alfredo Beltrán Leyva
- Antonio Oseguera Cervantes
- Benjamín Arellano Félix
- Carlos Beltrán Leyva
- Dionisio Loya Plancarte
- Edgar Valdez Villarreal
- Eduardo Arellano Félix
- Eduardo Ravelo
- El Chapo
- Érick Valencia Salazar
- Fausto Isidro Meza Flores
- Francisco Javier Arellano Félix
- Héctor Luis Palma Salazar
- Ismael Zambada García
- Iván Velázquez Caballero
- Jaime González Durán
- Joaquín Guzmán López
- Jorge Eduardo Costilla Sánchez
- José Antonio Yépez Ortiz
- José de Jesús Méndez Vargas
- José González Valencia
- Luis Fernando Sánchez Arellano
- María de los Ángeles Pineda Villa
- Mario Cárdenas Guillén
- Miguel Caro Quintero
- Miguel Treviño Morales
- Omar Treviño Morales
- Osiel Cárdenas Guillén
- Ovidio Guzmán López
- Rafael Caro Quintero
- Rosalinda González Valencia
- Rubén Oseguera González
- Sandra Ávila Beltrán
- Sara Aldrete
- Servando Gómez Martínez
- Teodoro García Simental
- Vicente Carrillo Fuentes
- Vicente Zambada Niebla

=== Deceased ===
- Amado Carrillo Fuentes
- Antonio Cárdenas Guillén
- Arturo Beltrán Leyva
- Arturo Guzmán Decena
- El Mencho
- Enrique Plancarte Solís
- Francisco Rafael Arellano Félix
- Héctor Beltrán Leyva
- Heriberto Lazcano Lazcano
- Homero Cárdenas Guillén
- Ignacia Jasso
- Ignacio Coronel Villarreal
- José Rodrigo Aréchiga Gamboa
- Juan José Esparragoza Moreno
- Juan Nepomuceno Guerra
- Lola la Chata
- Miguel Ángel Félix Gallardo
- Nazario Moreno González
- Pablo Acosta Villarreal
- Rafael Aguilar Guajardo
- Ramón Arellano Félix

== See also ==
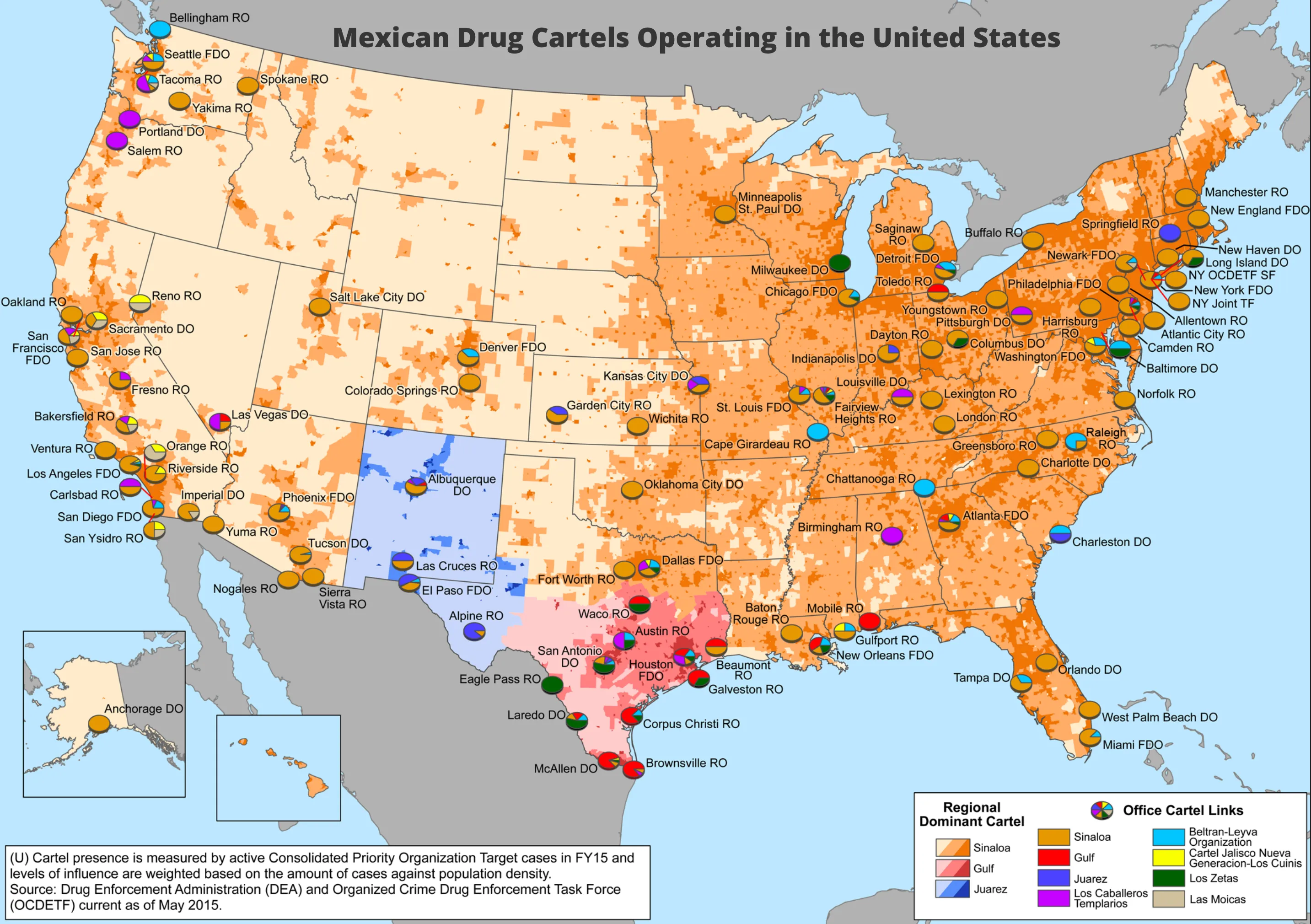
Mexican drug cartels operating in the United States

- Corruption in Mexico
- Drug cartels operating in the United States
- Human trafficking in Mexico and human trafficking in Texas
- Mexican Drug War
- Mexican Mafia
- Illegal drug trade
- Organized crime in Mexico
- People murdered by Mexican drug cartels
- List of Chinese criminal organizations
- List of criminal enterprises, gangs, and syndicates
- List of gangs in Latin America and list of Hispanic-American gangs
- List of gangs in Mexico
- Massacres in the Mexican drug war
- Smuggling of firearms into Mexico
- World War II and opium cultivation for morphine near Sinaloa, Culiacán
- 2009 Mexico most-wanted drug lords
