= Carlos Beltrán Leyva =

Convicted Mexican drug lord

- January 2010 mugshot of Beltrán Leyva
- Born: 1969 (age 56–57); Sinaloa, Mexico
- Occupation: Beltrán-Leyva Cartel drug lord
- Status: Incarcerated

Carlos Beltrán Leyva (born 1969) is a Mexican incarcerated drug lord with the Beltrán-Leyva Cartel. The cartel was created by the four Beltrán Leyva brothers: Carlos, Héctor, Alfredo and Arturo. Born in the Sinaloan countryside in the late 1960s, Carlos and his brothers worked closely with Joaquín "Chapo" Guzmán, the leader of the Sinaloa Cartel, during decades of smuggling.

The organization, run mainly by Arturo and Héctor, formed as a splinter group of the powerful Sinaloa Cartel, which was led by Joaquín Guzmán Loera. After Alfredo was arrested, the Beltrán-Leyva brothers blamed Guzmán Loera and retaliated by forming the Beltrán-Leyva Cartel, and killing one of the Sinaloa cartel chief's sons in a grenade attack on a Culiacán shopping center. This sparked a war between the Sinaloa Cartel and the Beltrán-Leyva Cartel, which allied itself with the Gulf Cartel.

== Warrant and arrest ==
Little is known about Carlos' role in the Beltrán-Leyva Cartel, and reports have differed on the importance of his position within the organization. A warrant had been out for his arrest since 2008. However, a 2008 list of Mexico's 37 top drug traffickers, for which the government offered rewards of as much as $2 million, did not include his name. George W. Grayson, a Mexico expert at The College of William & Mary, described Carlos as "the lowest profile of the brothers".

Carlos Beltrán Leyva was arrested in Culiacán on December 30, 2009, after he was stopped while driving with a forged license. He was found to be in possession of a pistol, a rifle, ammunition and cocaine, and was using the fake name Carlos Gámez Orpineda. The arrest came after a citizen tipped authorities to the presence of an armed man in Culiacán. The arrest was considered another in a string of blows against the Beltrán-Leyva Cartel, which had suffered from the death of Arturo Beltrán Leyva during a gun battle with police two weeks earlier. Carlos had not been mentioned by analysts as a possible successor to Arturo, and the fact that he was not accompanied by bodyguards at the time of his arrest may suggest his role in the cartel was limited. Nevertheless, media reports suggested the arrest of Carlos could set the stage for a bruising battle for control of the Beltrán-Leyva Cartel. The arrest was considered a victory in President Felipe Calderón's Mexican drug war, and a signal that the government would not back down in the face of recent reprisals from the death of Arturo Beltrán Leyva, including the murder of family members of Melquisedec Angulo Córdova, a marine killed during the gun battle that killed Arturo Beltrán Leyva.

His children, Rodrigo, Carlos Jossafath and Iris Beltrán, Rodrigo is currently a businessman, Jossafath is a content creator and Iris is a model.
