= Pelones =

Pelones is a Spanish word meaning "bald". It may refer to:

- A historical band of Lipan Apaches
- Los Pelones, a Mexican gang
