= 2009 Guanajuato and Hidalgo shootings =

Series of shootouts in Mexico

The 2009 Guanajuato and Hidalgo shootings were several shootouts that occurred on August 6, 2009, in Mexico between police and gunmen resulting in the seizure by police of 1.2 million pesos (more than $92,000), cocaine, assault rifles, police uniforms, bulletproof vests, handcuffs, hand grenades, and a variety of other military weapons.

At the time of one of the incidents, Hidalgo state police had been searching for federal agents who had been reported missing. The federal agents were found in the Mineral de la Reforma municipality of Hidalgo alive and well. Acting on a tip, police stopped four trucks carrying the assailants, who opened fire on police and fled. Upon pursuing the suspects, a firefight erupted which lasted 20 minutes. Over a dozen people were killed and 22 injured including several police agents in Pachuca, the capital of the Mexican state of Hidalgo.

In Guanajuato state, the cities of Silao and Irapuato suffered grenade and heavy-weapon attacks on police stations which killed a bystander, one police officer and injured 18 others. The police station in Silao was attacked with hand grenades, an AK-47, a 7.62×39mm caliber rifle and an AR-15 killing two and injuring ten people. In the city of La Calera, nine cartel suspects were killed. In the city of Ciudad Juárez in the Mexican state of Chihuahua, gunmen shot and killed a police investigator later that night.

There were similar assaults on police stations in July 2009 in several Michoacán state cities by the La Familia Michoacana drug cartel seeking retaliation after Mexican federal police arrested one of their top drug cartel leaders. The Mexican drug war, which began at the end of 2006, has seen more than 10,000 fatalities, about 10% of these police officials.

== See also ==
- Timeline of the Mexican drug war
