= List of Mexican cartels =

List of Mexican drug cartels

Map of active drug cartels in Mexico (2025)

Headquarters of different drug cartels in Mexico

This is a list of Mexican cartels, organizations identified as Mexico-based crime groups involved in drug trafficking, arms trafficking, human trafficking, murder, money laundering, and extortion.

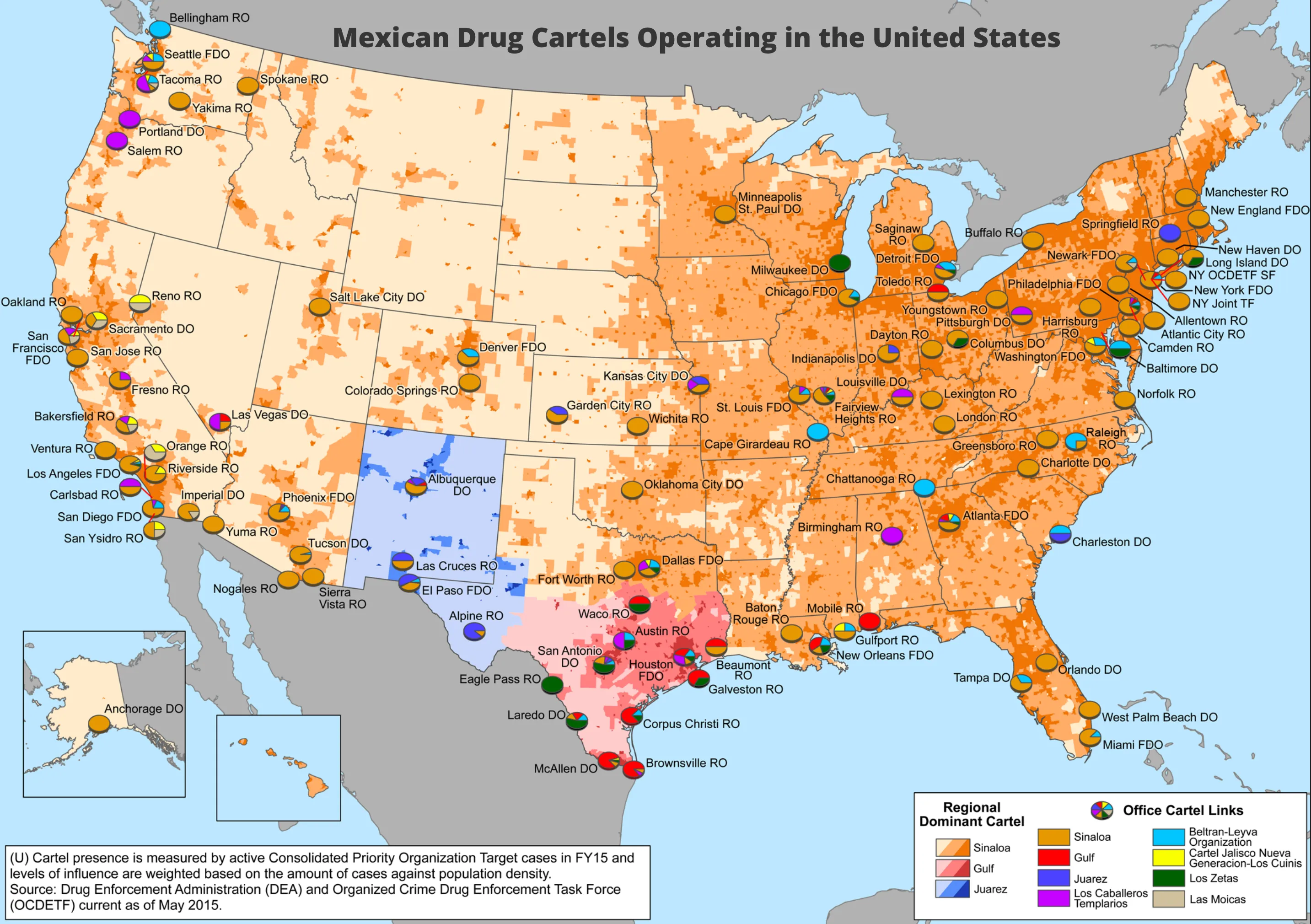
Mexican drug cartels operating in the United States in 2015

== List of drug cartels ==
=== Active cartels ===
- Caborca Cartel
- Cártel de Tláhuac
- Cártel del Abuelo
- Cártel del Noreste
- Cárteles Unidos
- Chiapas–Guatemala Cartel
- Fuerza Anti-Unión
- Gente Nueva (Note: Now called the Sonoran Independent Cartel)
- Gulf Cartel
  - Los Metros
  - Los Rojos
  - Los Ciclones
- Guerreros Unidos
- Jalisco New Generation Cartel
- Juárez Cartel
  - La Línea (gang)
- La Barredora
- La Familia Michoacana
- La Nueva Familia Michoacana
  - Los Viagras
  - Los Blancos de Troya
- La Unión Tepito
- Los Mazatlecos (Note: Now also called Cártel de Guasave. Started as an enforcer gang for the Beltrán-Leyva Cartel.)
- Los Talibanes
- Los Tlacos
- Nueva Plaza Cartel
- Sangre Nueva Zeta
- Santa Rosa de Lima Cartel
- Sinaloa Cartel
  - Artistas Asesinos
  - Grupo Flechas
  - Los Ántrax
  - Los Ninis
- Tijuana Cartel
- Zetas Vieja Escuela

=== Defunct cartels ===
- Beltrán-Leyva Organization
- Colima Cartel
- Guadalajara Cartel
- Independent Cartel of Acapulco
- Knights Templar Cartel
- Los Negros
- Los Zetas
- Milenio Cartel
- Oaxaca Cartel
- Sonora Cartel
- South Pacific Cartel

== See also ==
- 2009 Mexico most-wanted drug lords
- Corruption in Mexico
- Drug cartels operating in the United States
- Human trafficking in Mexico and human trafficking in Texas
- Illegal drug trade
- List of criminal gangs in Brazil
- List of gangs in Canada
- List of Hispanic-American gangs
- List of massacres in Mexico
- List of Mexican drug cartel figures
- Massacres in the Mexican drug war
- Mexican Mafia
- Missing persons in Mexico
- Organized crime in Mexico
- People murdered by Mexican drug cartels
- Smuggling of firearms into Mexico
- World War II and opium cultivation for morphine near Culiacán
