= Los Rojos Cartel =

Mexican criminal organization

- Cártel de los Rojos
- Founded: 2009
- Years active: 2009−present
- Territory: Guerrero, Morelos and Puebla
- Ethnicity: Mexican
- Leader: Jésus Nava Romero
- Criminal activities: Drug trafficking, money laundering, extortion, robbery, murder, arms trafficking, prostitution, kidnapping
- Allies: Guerreros Unidos
- Rivals: Mexico; Jalisco New Generation Cartel; La Familia Michoacana; Guerreros Unidos.

The Los Rojos Cartel (Spanish: Cártel de los Rojos) is a Mexican criminal organization that emerged as a split from the Beltran-Leyva Cartel, being led at first by brothers Arturo "El Barbas" and Héctor "El Ingeniero", Alfredo "El Mochomo" and Jésus Nava Romero "El Rojo", hence the name of the group. The group also has an important participation in drug trafficking to the United States.

== History ==
The group arose after the weakening of the Beltran-Leyva Cartel, settling in some areas of Guerrero and Morelos. Since then, they have engaged in a number of criminal activities, including its financing of eleven candidacies for municipal positions in the state of Morelos during 2015, in addition to increasing the climate of insecurity in the regions where they are active. The group also has ties with Alfonso Miranda Gallegos, mayor of Amacuzac municipality, who is accused of kidnapping and continues in his position from prison.

== Activities ==
The first leader of the group was Jésus Nava Romero alias "El Rojo", who died shortly after the creation of the group on 16 December 2009, during a confrontation between elements of the Mexican Navy and members of the Beltrán-Leyva Cartel in the city of Cuernavaca, Morelos.

Since the beginning of 2015, Los Rojos have more actively fought other cartels, with clashes that occurred on 23 February of the same year, which left 15 hitmen dead, near the towns of Tetela del Río and Cashacahui, in the municipality of General Heliodoro Castillo. The authorities confirmed that the cause of the confrontation was due to a dispute over territory between Los Rojos and cells belonging to La Familia Michoacana. In 2016, Los Rojos increased their hostilities and their presence in municipalities such as Ahuacuotzingo, Zitlala and Chilapa de Álvarez. An example of this was the irruption of more than 300 members of the self-defense groups that entered the municipality of Zitlala during the course of 5 May in response to the rise in violence in the region. As a result of the violence in the region, classes have been suspended in several schools in the municipalities, as well as reports of forced displacement.

On 24 October 2019, a confrontation was registered in the town of the community of Pocha-Huizco, Zitlala, Guerrero, a confrontation that left nine hitmen of Los Rojos dead, finding dozens of casings in the place. It was also confirmed that among the deceased were members of the close circle of Senen Nava, aka "El Chaparro", leader of the criminal group.

On 9 February 2021, a shooting was reported between an alleged self-defense group and Los Rojos, in the town of Mitepec in the municipality of Jolalpan, in the extreme southwest of Puebla. According to a witness, the confrontation lasted more than two hours, leaving three dead (two members of "La Ronda Ciudadana" and a hitman from Los Rojos), according to state authorities, being of great media relevance in the region.
