= South Pacific Cartel =

Mexican organized crime group

Cártel del Pacífico Sur
- Founded: April 2010
- Founded by: Héctor Beltrán Leyva (deceased)
- Founding location: Morelos, Mexico
- Years active: 2010-2018
- Territory: State of Morelos
- Criminal activities: Drug trafficking, kidnapping, murder
- Allies: Los Zetas, Los Mazatlecos
- Rivals: Sinaloa Cartel, Gulf Cartel

The South Pacific Cartel (Spanish: Cártel del Pacífico Sur) was a Mexican organized crime group composed of the remnants of the Beltrán-Leyva Cartel. It was based in the Mexican state of Morelos. The gang was significantly less active from mid-2011 when the group's leaders Julio de Jesus Radilla Hernandez and Victor Valdez were captured. The South Pacific Cartel was created by Héctor Beltrán Leyva, an ex leader of the Beltran Leyva Cartel, in April 2010.

The organization was known for having employed a 12-year-old gunman and executioner.

== See also ==
- List of Mexican drug cartels
