= Melquisedec Angulo Córdova =

Mexican Navy Special forces officer

- Born: January 2, 1979; Villahermosa, Tabasco, Mexico
- Died: December 16, 2009 (aged 30); Cuernavaca, Morelos, Mexico
- Burial place: Villahermosa, Tabasco Cemetery
- Military career
- Allegiance: Mexico
- Branch: Mexican Naval Infantry
- Rank: Tercer Maestre
- Unit: Fuerzas Especiales
- Conflicts: Mexican drug war: Death of Arturo Beltrán Leyva.

Melquisedec Angulo Córdova (January 2, 1979 – December 16, 2009) was a Mexican 2nd petty officer with the Navy's Special Forces. He was from Tabasco. Córdova was killed on December 16, 2009, during a gun battle in Cuernavaca against members of the Beltrán-Leyva Cartel.

Córdova was among the military forces that surrounded an upscale apartment complex harboring Arturo Beltrán Leyva, the cartel leader and one of the three most wanted criminals in Mexico. Córdova and two other navy personnel were wounded by a hand grenade, and Córdova succumbed to his injuries as he was being treated by medical personnel. He was the only special forces soldier killed during the gunfight. Arturo Beltrán Leyva was killed during the battle, and six of his gunmen were arrested. Córdova was 30 at the time of his death.

Córdova was honored as a Mexican hero during his funeral on December 21, 2009, in his home state of Tabasco. He received the highest military honors offered by the country, and was ushered to his grave by an honor guard of commandos wearing camouflage fatigues. His mother, Irma Córdova Palma, was presented a folded flag by Secretary of the Navy Mariano Francisco Saynez Mendoza. On December 22, only hours after the funeral, gunmen barged into the home of Córdova's family and fired nearly three dozen bullets. Irma Córdova Palma (64) and Córdova's sister Jolidabey Angulo Córdova (22) were killed immediately, while his aunt Josefa Angulo Flores (46) died while on the way to the hospital, his brother Benito Angulo Córdova (28) died shortly after arriving to the hospital and his other sister Miraldelly Angulo Córdova (24) died the following morning. Gudiel Ivan Sanchez was later arrested in Chiapas for his alleged role as one of the gunmen in the killings.

The killings were believed to be retaliation for the death of Arturo Beltrán-Leyva, as well as a warning against the military forces involved in President Felipe Calderón's war on Mexico's drug cartels. Although reprisals against families are not uncommon during the Mexican drug war, the murders of the family members of an already killed soldier are considered a very rare form of intimidation, and seem to violate a basic code of conduct prevalent even among hitmen and traffickers. The Córdova family was not afforded any special protection, and the shootings prompted questions as to whether Córdova's funeral should have been made so public. Experts also questioned whether the retaliation may have been prompted by the decision by authorities to show off pictures of Arturo Beltrán Leyva's dead body.
