= Alfredo Beltrán Leyva =

Convicted Mexican drug lord

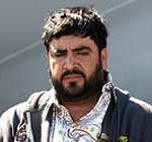
- Born: January 21, 1971 (age 55); La Palma, Badiraguato, Sinaloa, Mexico
- Other name: "El Mochomo"
- Occupation: Drug lord
- Employer(s): Co-founder of Beltrán-Leyva Cartel and founder of Los Mazatlecos
- Status: Incarcerated
- Conviction: Conspiracy to distribute 5 kilograms or more of cocaine, 50 grams or more of methamphetamine, 1 kilogram or more of heroin, and 1,000 kilograms or more of marijuana (21 U.S.C. §§ 959, 960, and 963)
- Penalty: Life sentence without the possibility of parole

Details
- Imprisoned at: ADX Florence

Alfredo Beltrán Leyva (born January 21, 1971), commonly referred to by his alias El Mochomo (The Desert Ant), is a Mexican convicted drug lord and former leader of the Beltrán-Leyva Cartel, a drug trafficking organization. He was one of Mexico's most-wanted drug lords. Beltrán Leyva was responsible for smuggling multi-ton shipments of cocaine and methamphetamine to the United States from Mexico and South America between the 1990s and 2000s. He worked alongside his brothers Héctor, Carlos, and Arturo.

In January 2008, Beltrán Leyva was arrested by the Mexican Army Special Forces in Culiacán, Sinaloa, and imprisoned at the Federal Social Readaptation Center No. 1, Mexico's maximum-security prison. He was extradited to the U.S. in November 2014 for drug trafficking charges. In April 2017, he was sentenced to life in prison and ordered to forfeit US$529 million to the U.S. government.

== Early life and career ==
Alfredo Beltrán was born in La Palma, Badiraguato, Sinaloa, Mexico on January 21, 1971. According to the United States Department of the Treasury, he has an alternative date of birth, February 15, 1951. He was nicknamed "El Mochomo" (English: The Desert Ant). He formed the Beltrán Leyva Cartel along with his brothers Héctor, Carlos and Arturo. Alfredo and his brothers worked closely with Joaquín "El Chapo" Guzmán Loera, the leader of the Sinaloa Cartel.

The Beltrán Leyva brothers trafficked narcotics to the U.S. since the 1990s with the help of the Sinaloa Cartel. In its heyday, the Beltrán Leyva Cartel dominated drug trafficking operations in western Mexico. Alfredo was responsible for managing multi-ton shipments of cocaine and methamphetamine from South America and Mexico to the U.S. from the 1990s to 2014, the year he was indicted. He obtained his cocaine supplies from South American groups and transported them to Mexico by air, land, and/or water. Once the drugs were in Mexico, the Beltrán Leyva Cartel distributed them to strategic points in Mexico before they reached the U.S. His criminal group often used violent means, including murders, kidnappings, and tortures, to continue their drug trafficking operations.

In 2008, the Beltrán Leyva Cartel broke away from the Sinaloa Cartel. After Alfredo was arrested, the Beltrán Leyva brothers blamed "El Chapo" for his capture and retaliated by ordering the murder of Edgar Guzmán López, son of Joaquín "El Chapo" Guzmán Loera. This sparked a war between the Sinaloa Cartel and the Beltrán Leyva Cartel, which allied itself with Los Zetas.

== Arrest and imprisonment ==
Beltrán Leyva was arrested by the Mexican Army in Culiacán, Sinaloa, with three members of his security circle on January 21, 2008, with two suitcases filled with $900,000 in cash and luxury watches. At the scene, the police discovered 20 fragmentation grenades, rifles, automatic weapons, and 40 bullet-resistant vest, eight which had a FEDA, the acronym of "Arturo's Special Forces" (Spanish: Fuerzas Especiales de Arturo). Authorities also found an unspecified amount of cash in one of his homes. He was then flown to Mexico City and imprisoned at the Federal Social Readaptation Center No. 1 (also known as "Altiplano"), Mexico's maximum-security prison.

Édgar Eusebio Millán Gómez, top commander of Mexico's national federal police and spokesman for the arrest, was murdered five months later. Mexican investigators believed that he was killed in retaliation for the capture of Alfredo.

On October 14, 2014, a federal court rejected Alfredo's writ of amparo (effectively equivalent to an injunction) preventing his extradition to the United States. The court rejected it under the rationale that it believed that the former drug lord met all the legal requirements for his extradition.

== Kingpin Act sanction ==
On December 3, 2009, the United States Department of the Treasury sanctioned Alfredo under the Foreign Narcotics Kingpin Designation Act (sometimes referred to simply as the "Kingpin Act"), for his involvement in drug trafficking along with twenty-one other international criminals and ten foreign entities. The act prohibited U.S. citizens and companies from doing any kind of business activity with him, and virtually froze all his assets in the U.S.

== Extradition ==
On November 15, 2014, Alfredo was extradited to the United States. He was appointed to make his court appearance in Washington, D.C. in a session direct by U.S. judge Alan Kay for his pending drug trafficking offenses. On November 17 through his lawyer, he pleaded not guilty for conspiracy to import large shipments of cocaine, heroin, marijuana, and methamphetamine from Mexico to the U.S.

== Trial and conviction ==
Alfredo's trial was scheduled to begin on February 8, 2016. He was represented by prominent criminal defense attorney Angel Eduardo Balarezo of Washington, D.C. On February 23, Alfredo pleaded guilty before U.S. District Judge Richard J. Leon of the District of Columbia to participating in international drug trafficking operations. On June 28, the prosecution issued a preliminary forfeit order and requested Alfredo to pay up to $US10 billion, which the government estimated he had generated through his drug trafficking schemes.

He was sentenced to life in prison on April 5, 2017, and ordered to forfeit US$529 million. The amount was based on the proceeds he made for shipping at least 27.9 tons of narcotics between 2000 and 2012. Alfredo's defense asked the judge to reduce his sentence to 25 years because their client had accepted his role in providing assistance to his brother Arturo to sell cocaine in Culiacán knowing that the drugs would end up in the U.S. Alfredo denied being involved in drug shipments to the U.S. and told the plaintiff that his brother was the true leader of Beltrán Leyva Cartel. The judge denied the defense's request because he stated that Alfredo did not accept full responsibility of his actions. In June 2022, Beltran Leyva was transferred from United States Penitentiary, Hazleton to ADX Florence.

== See also ==
- Mexican drug war
- Mérida Initiative
