= Los Pelones =

- Founded: 2004 by Joaquín El Chapo Guzmán and the Beltrán Leyva brothers
- Founding location: Guerrero, Mexico
- Years active: 2004-2025
- Territory: Guerrero; Morelos; Quintana Roo; Sonora
- Ethnicity: Mexican
- Activities: Drug trafficking, murder, extortion
- Allies: Gulf Cartel
- Rivals: Gente Nueva

Los Pelones ("The Bald Ones") is an enforcer gang originally part of the Mexican drug trafficking organization known as the Sinaloa Cartel, headed by the drug lord Joaquín El Chapo Guzmán, Mexico's most-wanted man.

== Etymology ==
Los Pelones literally means "The Bald Ones" in Spanish language; it symbolizes the "new soldiers" of the gang who shave their heads like military recruits.

== History ==
The gang originated in 2004 in the state of Guerrero, where it distributed narcotics throughout several touristic spots in the state.

=== Beltrán-Leyva split and the Gulf Cartel alliance ===
After the death of Arturo Beltrán Leyva they went independent. On December 27, 2012, the group announced that they had stopped operating independently and that now they are part of the "honorable" Gulf Cartel. In June 2020, it was reported that Los Pelones was now an independent cartel due to the fragmentation of the Gulf Cartel.

== See also ==
- Mexican drug war
- Los Negros
- Beltrán-Leyva Cartel
