= Noé Ramírez Mandujano =

Mexican police officer

- Occupation: Ex-head of SIEDO

Noé Ramírez Mandujano served as the anti-recreational drug chief of Mexico's Subprocuraduría de Investigación Especializada en Delincuencia Organizada (SIEDO, English: Specialized Investigation of Organized Crime) from 2006 to August 2008. In late 2008 authorities accused him of taking $450,000 per month United States dollars in bribes to tip off drug traffickers. He is now a law teacher at FES Acatlán, one of the many UNAM campus in Mexico.

== See also ==
- War on drugs
- Mérida Initiative
- Mexican drug war
