= Sangre Nueva Zeta =

Mexican criminal syndicate

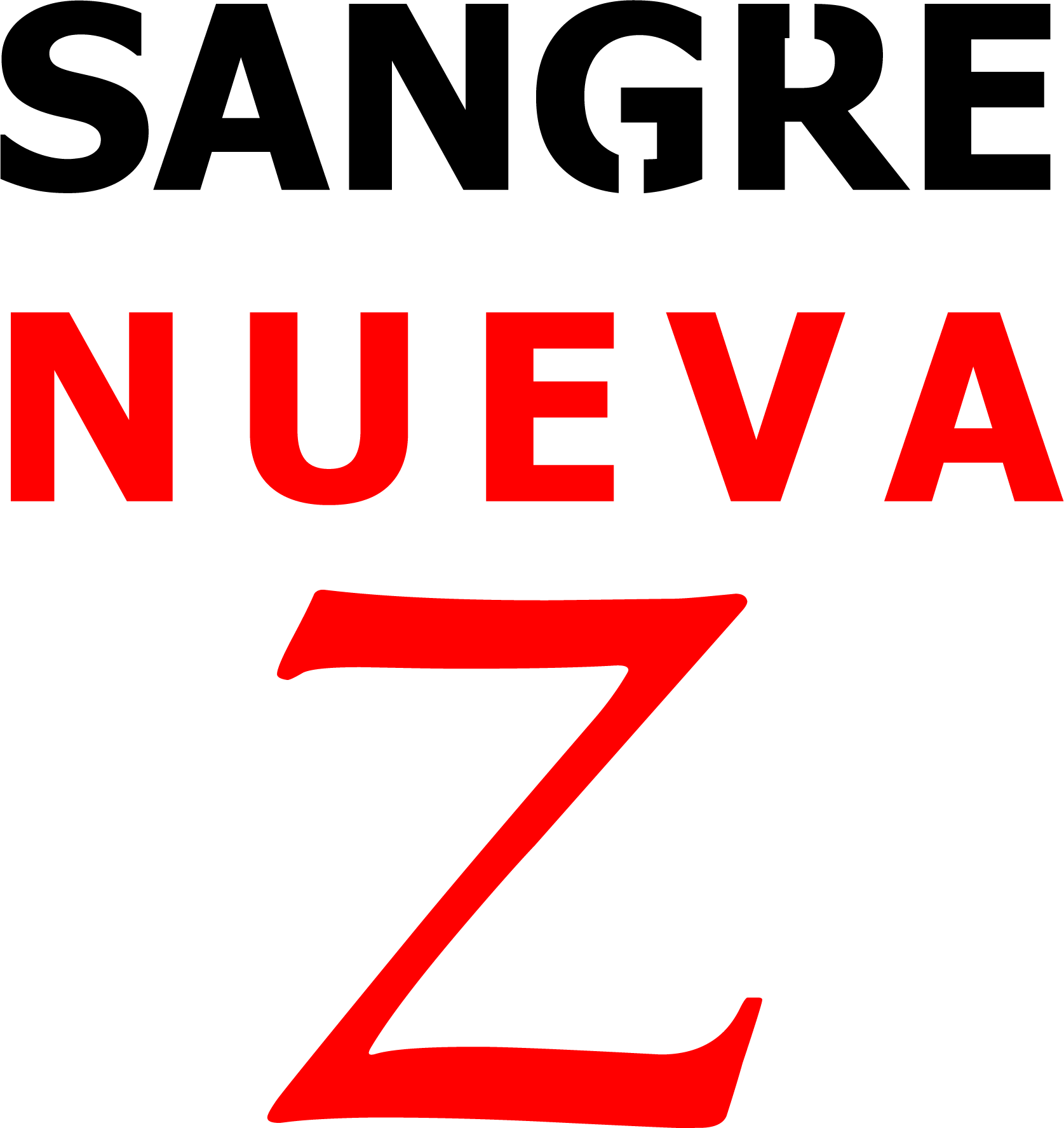
- Founded: 2019
- Founded by: Roberto de los Santos de Jesús
- Years active: 2019−present
- Territory: Puebla; Tlaxcala; Veracruz
- Ethnicity: Mexican
- Criminal activities: drug trafficking, kidnapping, extortion
- Allies: Jalisco New Generation Cartel

Sangre Nueva Zeta (lit. 'New Zeta Blood') is a Mexican criminal syndicate formed in 2019. The organization is made up of former members of Los Zetas.

== History ==
Sangre Nueva Zeta first appeared to the general public on 19 October 2019, when two messages were exhibited in the city of Puebla. They threatened Miguel Barbosa Huerta, governor of Puebla, and Fernando Manzanillo, secretary of the state government.

The group was founded by Roberto de los Santos de Jesús, nicknamed "El Bukanas", a trainer of sicarios from Los Zetas. Sangre Nueva Zeta then expanded thanks to its alliance with the Jalisco New Generation Cartel, a major enemy of Los Zetas, and also due to corruption.

On 17 December 2021, the Mexican Navy arrested Néstor "El Viejón" Carvajal Colotla in Tepeaca, Puebla. El Viejón is one of the leaders of Sangre Nueva Zeta and is one of the criminal group's links with the CJNG (he is said to have carried out several operations under the command of Nemesio Oseguera Cervantes). Barbosa welcomed this arrest and promised to dismantle the Sangre Nueva Zeta.

== Activities ==
Sangre Nueva Zeta originally focused on huachicol (theft and illicit sale of fuel) formed by elements practicing it for Los Zetas, acting in the so-called "Red Triangle", an area of Puebla known for fuel theft. However, it would expand in additional illegal activities, such as cocaine trafficking and extortion.

== Members ==
- Roberto de los Santos de Jesús, "El Bukanas": founder and leader of the cartel.
- Néstor "El Viejón" Carvajal Colotla: a cartel leader. Captured on 17 December 2021 in Tepeaca.
