= Beltrán-Leyva Organization =

Mexican drug cartel and organized crime syndicate

Beltrán Leyva
- Founded by: Arturo Beltrán Leyva; Carlos Beltrán Leyva; Alfredo Beltrán Leyva; Héctor Beltrán Leyva; Mario Alberto Beltrán Leyva; Edgar Valdez Villarreal
- Founding location: Sinaloa, Mexico
- Years active: 2003–2012
- Territory: Mexico: North Sinaloa, Morelos, Guerrero, Quintana Roo, Oaxaca, Chiapas, Nayarit, Michoacán; United States: California, Nevada, Texas, New Mexico
- Ethnicity: Mexican
- Criminal activities: Drug trafficking, human trafficking, murder, arms trafficking, intimidation, fencing, arson, burglary
- Allies: Los Mazatlecos; Los Zetas; Juarez Cartel; Independent Cartel of Acapulco; Knights Templar Cartel; Barrio Azteca; Tijuana Cartel; La Línea
- Rivals: La Familia Michoacana; Gulf Cartel; MS-13; Sinaloa Cartel

The Beltrán Leyva Organization (BLO), also known as the Beltrán Leyva Cartel (Spanish: Cártel de los Beltrán Leyva, pronounced [ˈkaɾtel ðe los βelˈtɾan ˈlejβa], CBL), was a Mexican drug cartel and organized crime syndicate, formerly headed by the five Beltrán Leyva brothers: Marcos Arturo, Carlos, Alfredo, Mario Alberto, and Héctor. Founded as a Sinaloa Cartel, the Beltrán Leyva cartel was responsible for transportation and wholesaling of cocaine, heroin and marijuana (and the production of the last two). It controlled numerous drug trafficking corridors, and engaged in human smuggling, money laundering, extortion, kidnapping, murder and gun-running.

The BLO was one of the most powerful Mexican drug cartels, which had effectively infiltrated the ranks of various Mexican government agencies and Mexico's Interpol. Its last known leader, Héctor Beltrán Leyva, was arrested in October 2014, having had a multimillion-dollar bounty placed on him by the governments of both the United States and Mexico. On August 11, 2011 the capture of one of the cartel's former top lieutenants, called "the last Beltran-Leyva link of any importance", prompted Mexican authorities to declare the cartel disbanded and extinct.

Following the fragmentation of the Beltrán Leyva Cartel, a lieutenant and close associate of Alfredo and Héctor Beltrán founded a splinter organization; Fausto Isidro Meza Flores, known as "El Chapo Isidro," is the leader of the Meza-Flores faction (also called the Guasave Cartel or Los Mazatlecos).

== History ==
Born in the Sinaloan countryside in the 1960s, the Beltrán Leyva brothers—Arturo, Carlos, Alfredo, Mario Alberto and Héctor—worked closely with their cousin, Joaquín "El Chapo" Guzmán, the leader of the Cartel, during decades of smuggling. Sensing a void in the rival Gulf Cartel after Osiel Cárdenas' arrest on March 14, 2003, the organization began to move into Gulf Cartel territory. The gangs fought each other in northern Mexican cities, resulting in the deaths of hundreds of people, including some civilians, police and journalists.

In 2004 and 2005, Arturo Beltrán Leyva led powerful groups of assassins to fight for trade routes in northeastern Mexico for the Cartel. Through the use of corruption or intimidation, the Beltrán Leyva Cartel was able to infiltrate Mexico's political, judicial and police institutions to feed classified information about anti-drug operations, and even infiltrated the Interpol office in Mexico.

During 2010, former Beltran Leyva cartel lieutenant Óscar Osvaldo García Montoya (a.k.a. El Compayito) attempted to regroup some cartel remnants under a gang he called La Mano Con Ojos. García Montoya was arrested on August 11, 2011; the Attorney General of Mexico had placed a 5 million pesos (US$400,000) bounty for his capture. Mexican authorities stated that García Montoya was "the last Beltrán-Leyva link of any importance", and that the cartel has been disbanded.

Allied forces of Los Zetas and Beltrán-Leyva remnants clashed on April 28, 2012 with gunmen of the organization in the Choix mountains. At least 32 armed men were confirmed dead. The renewed fighting in Sinaloa state between the BLO and the Cartel is supposedly sparked by the incursion of the Cartel and its allies in Nuevo Laredo, traditionally the biggest Zeta stronghold.

The last cartel leader, Héctor Beltrán Leyva, was captured on October 1, 2014 while eating at a popular restaurant in San Miguel de Allende, Guanajuato. The U.S. was offering a reward of US$5 million for information leading to his arrest. while the Mexican government was offering a US$2.1 million reward.

=== Switch of alliances ===
The arrest of Beltrán Leyva Organization leader Alfredo Beltrán Leyva (a.k.a. El Mochomo) ("The Desert Ant") on January 20, 2008, was a huge blow to the organization, as he allegedly oversaw large-scale drug-smuggling operations and was a key money launderer for the cartel. In apparent revenge for the arrest of his brother Alfredo, Arturo ordered the assassination of the commissioner of the Federal Police, Édgar Eusebio Millán Gómez, and other top federal officials in the Mexican capital. One group of these hit men was captured in a Mexico City house with dozens of assault rifles, pistols, grenade launchers, 30 hand grenades, and bullet-proof jackets bearing the legend FEDA—the Spanish acronym for 'Special Forces of Arturo'. Apparently, the Beltrán Leyva brothers blamed their partner and cousin Joaquin "El Chapo" Guzmán for their brother's arrest, and in retaliation ordered the assassination of Guzmán's son, 22-year-old Édgar Guzmán López, which was carried out in a shopping center parking lot by at least 15 gunmen using assault rifles and grenade launchers.

The residual impact of Alfredo's arrest not only undermined long-term alliances, but resurrected animosities between rival cartel leaders Joaquin "El Chapo" Guzmán and Arturo's new allies, the Juárez Cartel, and provided the catalyst behind the bloodshed in Mexico's most violent city: Ciudad Juárez. The Beltrán Leyva brothers, and those loyalists who departed the Cartel with them, allied with Los Zetas, causing an escalation of conflict in strongholds shared uneasily by "old" leaders.

In February 2010, the Beltrán Leyva Cartel and Los Zetas engaged in a violent turf war against the new alliance integrated by the Gulf Cartel, Sinaloa Cartel and La Familia Cartel in the border city of Reynosa, Tamaulipas, rendering some border towns "ghost towns".

Official reports from early 2010 revealed infighting for control of the cartel and its territory. One faction was led by lieutenants Édgar Valdez Villarreal and Gerardo Alvarez-Vazquez, while the other was led by Héctor Beltrán Leyva and his lieutenant Sergio Villarreal Barragán. In April 2010, Héctor Beltrán Leyva created a short-lived cell or branch in Morelos state called South Pacific Cartel (Cártel del Pacífico Sur) best known for having employed a 12-year-old gunman and executioner.

== Assets ==
The cartel's assets included:

- Dominance over drug and other illegal activities at airports in Mexico, Monterrey, Toluca, Cancún, and Acapulco;
- Hotels and restaurants constructed to launder money in Cancún, Acapulco, Cozumel, and other resorts;
- A working agreement with Los Zetas.
- Supply corridors for moving marijuana, heroin, and methamphetamine from the Andes to the Arctic;
- Capability to extort, launder money, run guns, smuggle humans, promote prostitution and carry out kidnappings;
- Operations in Mexico City, Chiapas, Guerrero, Guanajuato, Mexico State, Morelos, Nuevo León, Querétaro, Quintana Roo, Sinaloa, Sonora, and Tamaulipas, as well as in the United States and Canada;
- Access to some high-ranking public figures and Army personnel whom they bribed or intimidated.

Former suppliers

The Beltrán Leyva brothers' Colombian cocaine supplier, Ever Villafane Martínez, was arrested in Morelos in August 2008. After that, the organization pursued a relationship with Víctor and Darío Espinoza Valencia of Colombia's Norte del Valle cartel.

== Bounty ==
The United States offered a US$5 million reward for information leading to the arrest and/or conviction of Héctor Beltrán Leyva.

== Captures ==
Alfredo Beltrán Leyva was captured on January 20, 2008, and Arturo was killed by Mexican Marines in a shootout on December 16, 2009. Two weeks following Arturo's death, on December 30, 2009, Carlos Beltrán Leyva was captured by the Mexican Federal Police in Culiacán, Sinaloa after showing authorities a fake driver's license of an alias he was living under. Carlos was arrested on charges outstanding since 2008, including drug trafficking, criminal conspiracy, money laundering and illegal firearms.

At the same time as federal police arrested Carlos, Beltrán Leyva associates who allegedly murdered four relatives—a mother, siblings and an aunt—of one of the marines involved in the shootout that killed Arturo, were also arrested by Mexican authorities, with a hitman allegedly confessing to the crimes. The killings, allegedly in retaliation for Arturo's death, happened hours after the marine's funeral. On April 22, 2010, cartel lieutenant Gerardo Alvarez-Vazquez was captured on the outskirts of Mexico City; the U.S. had been offering a $2 million U.S. bounty for his arrest. Edgar Valdez Villarreal, the leader of Los Negros cartel enforcement, was arrested on August 30, 2010 outside Mexico City. On January 18, 2011, José Jorge Balderas Garza, known as "JJ", the lieutenant and financial operator of the Valdez Villarreal faction, was captured. On September 12, 2010, Sergio Villarreal Barragán was arrested in the city of Puebla, east of Mexico City. Héctor Beltrán Leyva was captured by the Mexican Armed Forces on October 1, 2014.

The August 11, 2011 arrest of Óscar Osvaldo García Montoya (a.k.a. El Compayito), a cartel lieutenant, was called "the last Beltran-Leyva link of any importance".

On April 16, 2014, the second-in-command, Arnoldo Villa Sánchez, was captured by Mexican authorities in the Condesa district in Mexico City.

On October 1, 2014, Hector Beltran Leyva and business associate German Goyenechea, who had become the cartel's chief financier, were both captured while eating at a popular restaurant in San Miguel de Allende.

On October 11, 2017, the U.S. Justice Department arrested Sajid Emilio Quintero Navidad, 36, at the San Ysidro Port of Entry. He was charged with money-laundering and drug-trafficking. Navidad, who also goes by the name El Cadete is the cousin of fugitive drug lord Rafael Caro Quintero, who is allegedly responsible for the killing of U.S. Drug Enforcement Administration Agent Enrique "Kiki" Camarena.

On July 4, 2019, Héctor Huerta Ríos, the leader of the Beltran-Leyva Cartel in Nuevo Leon who was previously arrested in 2009, was killed by a rival cartel after being shot while driving in Jalisco. His wife, who was in the car with her husband and their two daughters, identified his body to police the next day.

== Split ==
Following the death of Arturo Beltran Leyva on December 16, 2009, and the arrest of Edgar Valdez Villarreal on August 30, 2010, the Beltran Leyva brothers lost much of their influence. The cartel then divided into separate independent groups:

- Los Mazatlecos in Sinaloa and Nayarit, an armed loyalist wing of the Beltrán Leyva brothers, currently fighting the Sinaloa Cartel in northern Sinaloa.
- Los Negros a former Beltran Leyva enforcement squad, loyal to Edgar Valdez Villarreal after infighting broke out
- Fuerzas Especiales De Arturo (Special Forces of Arturo), an elite hitsquad loyal to Arturo Beltran Leyva
- Independent Cartel of Acapulco in Guerrero, currently fighting La Barredora.
- La Oficina In Aguascalientes and Zacatecas. Believed to be run by Chapo Isidro current leader of the Beltran Leyva organization along with the Velasco family well known in the state of Aguascalientes
- Los Charritos Most active hitsquad believed to have a heavy presence in the US (Chicago, Atlanta, Los Angeles, Las Vegas)
- La Barredora in Guerrero, currently fighting the Independent Cartel of Acapulco
- South Pacific Cartel in Morelos, a short-lived cell
- Los Pelones in Morelos. These are former enforcers of the Beltrán-Leyva brothers, now part of the Gulf Cartel.
- Los Rojos Cartel, in Guerrero. These are former enforcers of the Beltrán-Leyva brothers, apparently independent and dominating much of Guerrero.
- Guerreros Unidos (United Warriors) in Morelos and Guerrero
- Los Tequileros, a cell of Guerreros Unidos in Tierra Caliente that specializes in extorting politicians

== See also ==
- List of gangs in Mexico
- List of Mexico's 37 most-wanted drug lords
