= Édgar Eusebio Millán Gómez =

Mexican lawyer and chief of police and murder victim

- Born: 1967; Mexico City, Mexico
- Died: 8 May 2008 (aged 40–41); Mexico City, Mexico
- Cause of death: Gun shots
- Occupations: Lawyer, Federal Police Commander
- Employer: Secretariat of Public Security

Édgar Eusebio Millán Gómez (1967 – 8 May 2008) was a third-ranking member of Mexico's Secretariat of Public Security and acting commissioner of the Federal Preventive Police. Born in Mexico City, he received a law degree from the Universidad del Valle de México. After graduating he started his career in the Mexican Federal Police and received training in several countries.

On 8 May 2008, at the age of 41, Commander Millán was shot to death at his Mexico City home just after arriving at midnight. He was hit eight times in the chest and once in a hand. He died a few hours later at Metropolitan Hospital. Intelligence officials said it was highly likely that he was killed in retribution for the arrest on 21 January of Alfredo Beltrán Leyva.

His funeral was attended by the highest-ranking officials in Mexico, including President Felipe Calderón and Guillermo Galván Galván, general of the Mexican Army.

In June 2011, a federal judge sentenced his killer, Alejandro Ramirez Baez, to 60 years in prison along with an accomplice. Alejandro Ramirez Baez killed Edgar Millán Gomez on behalf of the Beltrán-Leyva Cartel.
