= Héctor Beltrán Leyva =

Mexican drug lord

- Born: 15 February 1962; Badiraguato, Sinaloa, Mexico
- Died: 18 November 2018 (aged 56); Toluca, State of Mexico, Mexico
- Other names: "El Ingeniero", "El H" "El General" Mario Alberto Beltrán Leyva
- Occupation: Leader of the Beltrán Leyva Cartel
- Height: 178 cm (5 ft 10 in)
- Spouse: Clara Elena Laborín Archuleta aka “La Señora"
- Children: 1
- Status: Deceased
- Reward amount: Mexico: $30 million Mexican Pesos; US: $5 million USD
- Wanted by: The Mexican PGR and the DEA
- Accomplices: Germán Goyeneche Ortega (alleged financial operator), Marcos Arturo Beltrán Leyva, Alfredo Beltrán Leyva and Carlos Beltrán Leyva
- Wanted since: 2004

Details
- Imprisoned at: Federal Social Readaptation Center No. 1 (Altiplano), Almoloya de Juárez, State of Mexico, Mexico

Héctor Manuel Beltrán Leyva (15 February 1962 – 18 November 2018) was a Mexican drug lord and leader of the Beltrán Leyva Cartel, a drug-trafficking organization. He was the brother of Arturo Beltrán Leyva (deceased), former leader of the cartel. Héctor was the second-in-command and rose to the leadership of the criminal organization after his brother's death on 16 December 2009 during a confrontation with Mexican marines.

== Career ==
Although originally a part of the Sinaloa Cartel, the four Beltrán Leyva brothers broke ties with the organization in 2008 after Alfredo Beltrán Leyva was arrested by Mexican military special forces, and the Beltrán Leyva brothers blamed their boss Joaquín Guzmán (a.k.a. El Chapo). In response to the supposed betrayal, the Beltrán Leyva brothers ordered the murder of 22-year-old Édgar Guzmán López, a son of Joaquín Guzmán, who was killed in a shopping center parking lot by at least 15 gunmen using assault rifles and grenade launchers.

The remaining four Beltrán Leyva brothers established the Beltrán Leyva Cartel and forged a collaboration pact with their former rivals: the Gulf Cartel and Los Zetas. Today, the Beltrán Leyva Cartel is responsible for the procurement of firearms and ammunition from the global black market in furtherance of their criminal enterprise and is responsible for the trafficking of multi-ton amounts of illicit drugs, including cocaine, marijuana, heroin, and methamphetamine. Héctor Beltrán Leyva is also credited with rising rates of violence within Mexico, as his organization is reportedly responsible for kidnapping, torture, murder, and various other acts of violence against numerous men, women, and children in Mexico. The cartel is considered one of the most ruthless and brutal in the way they dispose of their enemies. The organization is connected with the assassinations of numerous Mexican law enforcement officials, including Édgar Eusebio Millán Gómez, the former acting commissioner of the Mexican Federal Preventive Police.

== Bounty ==
The U.S. Department of State was offering a reward of US$5 million for information leading to the arrest and/or conviction of Héctor Beltrán Leyva, while the Mexican government offered a US$2.1 million bounty reward.

=== Kingpin Act sanction ===
On 3 December 2009, the United States Department of the Treasury sanctioned Beltrán Leyva under the Foreign Narcotics Kingpin Designation Act (sometimes referred to simply as the "Kingpin Act"), for his involvement in drug trafficking along with twenty-one other international criminals and ten foreign entities. The act prohibited U.S. citizens and companies from doing any kind of business activity with him, and virtually froze all his assets in the U.S.

== Arrest ==
Beltrán Leyva was arrested by the Mexican Army on Wednesday, 1 October 2014.

On 6 October 2014, he was transferred by federal agents to the Federal Social Readaptation Center No. 1 (commonly referred to simply as "Altiplano"), a maximum-security prison in Almoloya de Juárez, State of Mexico. He was accused of violating Mexico's Federal Law of Firearms and Explosives. The next day, he was formally charged in a federal court for drug trafficking, money laundering, and organized crime offenses.

== Death ==
On 18 November 2018, Beltrán Leyva began having chest pains. A prison guard reported this to medical personnel, who tried to give him first aid attention in his prison cell. As his symptoms worsened, he was transported to the Adolfo López Mateos Medical Center in Toluca, State of Mexico. According to the medics, he died of a heart attack in the emergency room. Upon his death, the hospital notified authorities and stated they would conduct an autopsy, as required by Mexican law. His family was notified of the death and they claimed the body. The hospital's emergency area was safeguarded by security forces while Beltrán Leyva was receiving medical attention.

== See also ==
- Mérida Initiative
- Mexican drug war
- List of Mexico's 37 most-wanted drug lords
