= Arturo Beltrán Leyva =

Mexican drug lord

- Undated photograph of Arturo Beltrán Leyva
- Born: Marcos Arturo Beltrán Leyva; September 27, 1961; Badiraguato, Mexico
- Died: December 16, 2009 (aged 48); Cuernavaca, Mexico
- Cause of death: Multiple gunshot wounds
- Occupation: Member of the Beltrán Leyva Cartel
- Height: 6 ft (1.8 m)

Arturo Beltrán Leyva (September 27, 1961 – December 16, 2009) was a Mexican drug lord who, alongside his brothers, founded and led the Beltrán-Leyva Cartel. Prior to founding his own organization, Beltran-Leyva was a longtime high-ranking member of the Sinaloa Cartel. Beltrán-Leyva cartel was responsible for organizing cocaine, marijuana, heroin and methamphetamine production, transportation and wholesaling. It controlled numerous drug trafficking corridors into the United States and was responsible for money laundering, gun-running, and other acts of violence against men, women, and children in Mexico. The organization was connected with the assassinations of numerous Mexican law enforcement officials.

Since the mid-1990s Arturo Beltrán Leyva allegedly led powerful groups of assassins to fight for trade routes in northeastern Mexico. By 2008, through the use of corruption or intimidation, he was able to infiltrate Mexico's political, judicial and police institutions to steal classified information about anti-drug operations, and even infiltrated the Interpol office in Mexico.

== Breakaway from the Sinaloa Cartel ==
The Beltrán-Leyva Cartel was founded and named after the brothers Arturo, Alfredo, Alberto, Carlos and Héctor Beltrán Leyva after they separated from the Sinaloa cartel, which was led by Joaquín Guzmán Loera a.k.a. "El Chapo".

Arturo Beltrán Leyva and his four brothers worked as underbosses and security chiefs for the Sinaloa cartel leaders. The breakaway from the Sinaloa Cartel was motivated by the capture of Alfredo Beltrán Leyva "El Mochomo" ('Desert Ant') by the Mexican military on January 21, 2008, which the brothers attributed to a betrayal by their boss Joaquín "El Chapo" Guzmán. After this incident, the Beltrán Leyva brothers and their lieutenants defected from the Sinaloa Cartel and allied themselves with the Gulf Cartel and Los Zetas.

Alfredo's influence had penetrated deep into the Attorney General of Mexico office by bribing Mexico's former drug czar, Noé Ramírez Mandujano and other top ranking officials. Ramírez Mandujano, who was the head of the country's top organized crime unit SIEDO, received US$450,000 per month to tip them off on the how, when and where any actions or operations against them would be taken.

== Kingpin Act sanction ==
On May 30, 2008, the United States Department of the Treasury sanctioned Beltrán Leyva under the Foreign Narcotics Kingpin Designation Act (sometimes referred to simply as the "Kingpin Act"), for his involvement in drug trafficking along with three other international criminals and three entities. The act prohibited U.S. citizens and companies from doing any kind of business activity with him, and virtually froze all his assets in the U.S.

== Death ==
On December 11, 2009, in Ahuatepec, Morelos, a town bordering Cuernavaca, Arturo Beltrán Leyva held a Christmas party at a house located in one of the most luxurious gated communities in Cuernavaca. He hired artists such as Ramón Ayala and Los Cadetes de Linares, and more than 20 prostitutes to entertain his guests. The Mexican Navy's elite Special Forces unit surrounded the house and tried to capture him, but in the exchange of fire he escaped. Three gunmen were killed along with an innocent bystander (a neighbor) and more than 11 bodyguards were captured. Authorities confiscated US$280,000 in cash, 16 rifles (AK-47 and AR-15), 4 pistols, 74 rifle magazines, and 1,700 rounds of ammunition.

Mexican Navy intelligence kept track of him and five days later, on December 16, 2009, he was traced to another luxurious apartment community where a 90-minute shootout ensued. About 200 Mexican Marines, two Navy Mil Mi-17 helicopters, from which marines rappelled, and two small Army tanks surrounded the building complex where he was hiding. Approximately 20 fragmentation hand grenades were used by Beltrán Leyva's gunmen to keep the Navy from advancing into his position.

Arturo Beltrán Leyva and three gunmen were killed; a fourth gunman committed suicide. Among the items seized by authorities during this raid, there were US$40,000 in cash, several thousand Canadian dollars, five assault rifles (AK-47 and AR-15), one pistol, and several religious scapulars and medallions.

The Mexican government had listed Arturo Beltrán Leyva as one of its 24 most-wanted drug lords and had offered a US$2.1 million reward for his capture.

== Revenge ==
Melquisedec Angulo Córdova, the Special Forces marine who was killed during the confrontation with Arturo Beltrán Leyva, was buried with military honors on December 21, 2009. The next day, a group of gunmen assassinated members of the marine's family, including his mother. Gudiel Ivan Sanchez was later arrested in Chiapas for his alleged role as one of the gunmen in the killings. While the December 22 shootings were taking place, a "narcomanta" (banner) was placed on a kindergarten school in the state of Morelos and a section of the school was set on fire. The 'narcomanta' warned of further reprisals against anybody interfering with the cartel's affairs.

== In popular culture ==
A highly fictionalized portrayal of Beltran Leyva, renamed to "Bernal Leyda", is featured in the 2017 TV series "El Chapo".

Diego Calva portrays him in Narcos: Mexico Season 3.

== See also ==
- Mexican drug war
- Mérida Initiative
- Narco submarine
- List of Mexico's 37 most-wanted drug lords
