= Los Negros =

Mexican criminal organization

- Founded: 2003
- Founded by: Edgar Valdez Villarreal
- Founding location: Nuevo Laredo, Tamaulipas, Mexico
- Years active: 2003−2010
- Ethnicity: Mexican
- Criminal activities: Drug trafficking, people smuggling, money laundering, extortion, kidnapping, murder and arms trafficking
- Allies: Israeli mafia
- Rivals: Beltrán-Leyva Cartel; Gulf Cartel; MS-13; La Familia Cartel; Sinaloa Cartel; Los Zetas

Los Negros ('The Black Ones') was a criminal organization that was once the armed wing of the Sinaloa Cartel and after a switch of alliances, became the armed wing of the Sinaloa splinter gang, the Beltrán-Leyva Cartel. In 2010 it went independent and had been contesting the control of the Beltrán-Leyva Cartel. It was then the criminal paramilitary unit of Édgar Valdez Villarreal (a.k.a. "La Barbie") in Mexico. Valdez was arrested on August 30, 2010, near Mexico City. Los Negros was led by Valdez at the time they merged with the Sinaloa Cartel.

== Background ==
The group was originally formed from the remnants of the Los Chachos gang from Nuevo Laredo to counter Los Zetas gang and government security forces. Los Negros used to work with the Beltrán-Leyva Cartel but following Arturo Beltrán Leyva's death in December 2009 during a shootout with Mexican Marines, infighting broke out for the control of the Beltrán-Leyva Cartel. One faction was led by lieutenants Édgar Valdez Villarreal and Gerardo Alvarez-Vazquez, while the other is led by the current cartel leader Héctor Beltrán Leyva and his 'enforcer' lieutenant, Sergio Villarreal Barragán. Los Negros then worked with Edgar Valdez Villarreal's organization until his arrest on August 30, 2010, then the gang collapsed.

Los Negros had been known to employ gangs such as Mexican Mafia and MS-13 to carry out murders and other illegal activities. The group was involved in fighting other cartels in the Nuevo Laredo region for control of the drug trafficking corridor.

Its operational area was originally Tamaulipas, and later extended its influence to Nuevo León and Coahuila states. They also had operations in San Luis Potosí, Veracruz, Michoacán, Guerrero, Zacatecas and Sonora.

== Nuevo Laredo ==
2003 shootout

At around 3 a.m. on 1 August 2003, the Federal Investigations Agency (AFI) confronted a group of armed men in the streets of Nuevo Laredo. Members of the AFI were staying at a hotel when Juan Manuel Muñoz Morales, the attorney general of the city, called for help. He was reportedly being chased by several individuals in a dark-colored truck. Consequently, the AFI officers followed the truck with seven of their vehicles, triggering a shootout between the police officers and alleged drug traffickers. The armed confrontation lasted for more than 40 minutes, provoking "panic" and turning Nuevo Laredo into a "battlefield." The gunshots were heard throughout most of the city, creating "tension" among the population. Some witnesses, who preferred to remain anonymous, claimed that they saw over "18 armed men in black with ski-masks."

During the chase, five armed men in another vehicle shot at the police convoy. The triggermen in the two vehicles then engaged in a gunfight with the AFI for minutes, but one of the vehicles collided with a police truck. The vehicle the drug traffickers were in then caught on fire, and two of the gunmen burned to death. The third one died on the sidewalk. According to PGR, the three gunmen that were killed were members of Los Negros, a group of hitmen under the tutelage of Joaquín Guzmán Loera (a.k.a. El Chapo) and of the Sinaloa Cartel. Rocket-launchers, along with an "inexact number of assault rifles," were reportedly used in the attack. In addition, the government agency stated that 198 municipal police officers were to be investigated for possible connections with the Gulf Cartel; Manuel Muñoz, the attorney general who was being chased, was detained by the Mexican authorities. It is believed that he had liberated five members of Los Zetas who had been detained during the armed confrontation. According to Esmas.com, this shooting was the first major gunfire in Nuevo Laredo between the Mexican authorities and cartel members in over thirty years.

Between 1 January and 1 August 2003, 45 homicides were reported in Nuevo Laredo, along with 40 kidnappings.

Background

Nuevo Laredo, Tamaulipas, was at the center of a war between the Gulf Cartel's Los Zetas and the Sinaloa Cartel's Los Negros. Following the 2003 arrest of Gulf Cartel leader Osiel Cárdenas, it is believed the Sinaloa Cartel moved 200 men into the region to battle the Gulf Cartel for control. The Nuevo Laredo region is an important drug trafficking corridor as 40% of all Mexican exports, a total of 9,000 trucks, pass through the region into the United States.

Following the 2004 assassination of journalist Roberto Javier Mora García from El Mañana newspaper, much of the local media was silenced over the fighting. The cartels intimidated the media and sometimes use it to send messages to the general population. In 2008, Édgar Valdéz placed an ad in the local paper accusing Los Zetas of being "narco-kidnappers" and purchasing protection from state officials and the attorney general's office.

== Connection with the Cabañas Case ==
The morning of January 25, 2010, the football player Salvador Cabañas was wounded by a gunshot to the head. Through the recording of a CCTV camera José Jorge Balderas Garza, a.k.a. "JJ", was identified as his attacker. According to his own statements Valdez-Villarreal himself was the person who gave "JJ" shelter to protect him from the police, by placing him in one of his safe houses, this was because of the friendship they had.

== Persons known to be related with Los Negros ==
- Édgar Valdéz Villarreal, a.k.a. "La Barbie", (Leader until his arrest)
- José Jorge Balderas Garza a.k.a. "jj" (Friend of Valdéz-Villareal and the man who shot football player Salvador Cabañas)
- Gerardo Alvarez-Vazquez, a.k.a. "El Indio" (Friend of Valdéz-Villareal and former member of Los Negros)
- Benjamin Yeshurun Sutchi (Friend of “La Barbie” also Leader of the Israeli Mafia until his death)

== See also ==
- Drug Enforcement Administration
- List of gangs in Mexico
- Drug War
- Mexican drug war

== Printed material ==
- Veledíaz, Juan (2004). «ABC de los Zetas, Génesis de los sicarios». La Revista (37). "ABC of the Zetas, Genesis of hitmen." Magazine (37). p. 25.
- Resa Nestares, Carlos (2004). Resa Nestares, Carlos (2004). «El mito de los Zetas». "The myth of the Zetas." Magazine (37). p. 32.
- Montemayor, Carlos (2004). «Ejércitos Privados». La Jornada (Marzo, 6). [1] . "Private armies". La Jornada (March 6). [1].
- Medellín, Jorge. ↑ Medellin Jorge. « Desertan 1,382 militares de elite », El Universal, 28 de marzo de 2004. " 1.382 military elite Desert," El Universal, March 28, 2004. Retrieved on 2008-09-23.
- Martínez Rodríguez, Marco A. « El poder de los "Zetas" » (in Spanish) . "The power of the 'Zetas' (in Spanish). Monographs. Retrieved on 2008-08-23.
