= 2012 in organized crime =

In 2012, a number of events took place in organized crime. The Mexican drug war continued to be a focus throughout the year.

== Events ==
Ongoing: 2011–12 in the Mexican drug war

=== January ===
- January 4 – Mexican drug cartel kingpin Benjamín Arellano Félix pleads guilty to racketeering and conspiracy to launder money in the United States.

=== February ===
- February 19 – At least 44 people are killed in a prison brawl in Apodaca, Nuevo León. The brawl is believed to have been started after the Gulf Cartel and Los Zetas, two rival Mexican drug cartels, clashed inside the prison.

=== April ===
- April 29 – Seven people are killed in a three-way shootout between rival drug cartels and the authorities in the Mexican state of Sinaloa.

=== May ===
- May 2 – A gunfight between the Mexican Army and suspected gunmen of a drug cartel left 12 dead in the state of Sinaloa.
- May 4 – 2012 Nuevo Laredo massacres
  - 23 bodies—14 of them decapitated and 9 of them hanged from a bridge—are found in the Mexican city of Nuevo Laredo; those killed were reportedly members of the Gulf Cartel who were killed by Los Zetas, a rival cartel.
  - Three journalists are killed and their bodies dumped in plastic bags in a canal in Boca del Río in the Mexican state of Veracruz, where the rival criminal groups of Los Zetas and the Gulf Cartel are fighting for territorial control.
- May 9 – 15 mutilated bodies are found inside two abandoned SUVs in the state of Jalisco, a region that is under dispute between Los Zetas and the Sinaloa Cartel. The Mexican authorities believe the massacre is a response by Los Zetas for the 2012 Nuevo Laredo massacres reportedly carried out by Joaquín Guzmán Loera (a.k.a. El Chapo).

=== June ===
- June 5 – The dismembered remains of 7 bodies are found in the Mexican state of Sinaloa. The bodies are discovered along with a written message accusing the authorities of cooperating with the Sinaloa Cartel, suggesting that the message may have been written by Los Zetas.
- June 25 – Alleged drug traffickers shoot and kill 3 policemen who were on an anti-narcotics operative inside the Mexico City International Airport. The assassins were wearing law enforcement uniforms, although the Mexican authorities said that the cartel members sometimes wear false uniforms. No suspects have been arrested.
- June 29 – A car bomb explodes outside the city hall in the Mexican border city of Nuevo Laredo, injuring 7 bystanders. This is the third car bomb in Nuevo Laredo this year, and much of the violence is blamed on the country's most powerful cartels: Los Zetas and the Sinaloa Cartel.

=== July ===
- July 5 – A high-ranking drug boss in the Mexican criminal group known as Gulf Cartel is apprehended in Costa Rica.
- July 9 –
  - Ten decapitated bodies are discovered inside an abandoned vehicle along a roadside in the Mexican city of Torreón, Coahuila. Reportedly, a written message was left behind by the perpetrators.
  - A gunbattle breaks out near Choix, Sinaloa, after alleged drug traffickers ambushed and killed seven police officers; upon the aggression, the officers gunned down four cartel members.
  - The FBI reveals that the Los Zetas laundered millions of dollars through accounts at Bank of America; that money was then used to finance a horse racing business in the United States, allegedly ran by José Treviño Morales.

=== August ===
- August 1 – Prosecutors formally charge three Mexican Army generals, including active General Roberto Dawe Gonzalez and retired General Tomás Ángeles Dauahare, and a lieutenant-colonel for their alleged links to a drug trafficking organization known as the Beltrán-Leyva Cartel.
- August 3 – The Mexican Army arrests another member of Los Zetas cartel responsible for decapitating 49 bodies and dumping them on a roadside in May 2012; the suspect is one of the 37 fugitives of the Apodaca prison riot earlier this year.
- August 5 –
  - Armed men kidnap the mayor of Tecpán de Galeana, Guerrero.
  - Cartel members armed with AK-47 assault rifles gun down and kill five teenage boys in Escobedo, Nuevo León.
- August 6 – Alleged members of Los Zetas cartel attack several media outlets in Monterrey for publishing on a rumored split between the two principal Zetas bosses.
- August 10 – Four suspected drug traffickers of the Sinaloa Cartel, including the cousin of Joaquín "El Chapo" Guzmán, Mexico's most-wanted drug lord, are captured in Spain.
- August 14 – Alleged members of the Gulf Cartel storm a bar in Monterrey and kill 10 people.
- August 15 – Mexican authorities confirm that the Jalisco New Generation Cartel is responsible for murdering five journalists in the state of Veracruz. This information was confirmed after the arrest of some of the members in the criminal organization.

=== September ===
- September 1 – Eduardo Arellano Félix, a former drug lord of the Tijuana Cartel, is extradited to the United States from Mexico. He is the last brother of the cartel in a 2003 indictment to be extradited.
- September 4 – The Mexican authorities arrest Mario Cárdenas Guillén, the second-in-command in the Gulf Cartel, leaving Jorge Eduardo Costilla Sánchez as the last standing man in the criminal organization.
- September 13 – Jorge Eduardo Costilla Sánchez, the supreme leader of the Gulf Cartel and one of the most-wanted drug lords in Mexico, is arrested in the state of Tamaulipas.

=== October ===
- October 13 – The Mexican Army kills Manuel Torres Félix, one of the leaders of the Sinaloa Cartel.

=== November ===
- November 23 – The Mexican federal police arrested Joe Saenz, one of the FBI Ten Most Wanted Fugitives, in the western city of Guadalajara.
- November 27 – Mexican beauty queen María Susana Flores Gámez, crowned as 2012 Woman of Sinaloa, is killed during a weekend shootout in Sinaloa.

== Arts and literature ==
- Killing Them Softly

== Deaths ==
- January 23 – Anthony Capo, 52, American mobster-turned-informant (DeCavalcante crime family).
- August 15 – Matthew Ianniello, 92, American mobster, member of the Genovese crime family.
- October 13 – Manuel Torres Félix, 58, Mexican drug trafficker for the Sinaloa Cartel.
- October 22 – Chuckie Merlino, 73, American mobster (Philadelphia crime family).
- December 25 – Frank Calabrese Sr., 75, American mafia hitman (Family Secrets).

== See also ==
- Timeline of the Mexican drug war
- Timeline of organized crime

== Bibliography ==
=== References ===
- Kelly, Robert J.; Schatzberg, Rufus; Chin, Ko-lin (1994). Handbook of organized crime in the United States (1994 ed.). Greenwood Publishing Group. ISBN 0-313-28366-4.
- Vilalta, C. (2011). "Monthly patterns, trends, and trajectories in the count of deaths related to organized crime, 2006-2010" (PDF). Conference at UAEM (in Spanish), April 26, 2011. Archived from the original (PDF) on 17 August 2011.
