= Baku fire =

There have been several major fires in post-Soviet Baku, Azerbaijan:

- 1995 Baku Metro fire - 289 people killed
- 2015 Baku residence building fire - 15 people killed
- 2018 Baku fire - 26 people killed
