= Nuestra Belleza Coahuila 2012 =

- Date: July 5, 2012
- Presenters: Daniel Poza, Susu Luna, Ana Isabel Muñoz
- Entertainment: Marconi
- Venue: Hotel Crown Plaza, Torreón, Coahuila
- Broadcaster: Televisa
- Entrants: 7
- Placements: 3
- Winner: Cecilia Vázquez; Saltillo

Nuestra Belleza Coahuila 2012, was held at the Hotel Crowne Plaza of Torreón, Coahuila on July 5, 2012. At the conclusion of the final night of competition, Cecilia Vázquez from Saltillo was crowned the winner. Vázquez was crowned by outgoing Nuestra Belleza Coahuila titleholder, Diana Ávila. Seven contestants competed for the state title.

== Results ==
=== Placements ===
Final results	Contestant
Nuestra Belleza Coahuila 2012	Cecilia Vázquez
Suplente / 1st Runner-up	Claudia Cervantes
2nd Runner-up	Ángela del Carmen Del Río

=== Special awards ===
Award	Contestant
Miss Photogenic	Adrán del Carmen García
Miss Congeniality	Ana Luisa Kuess
Best Body	Ana Luisa Kuess; Ángela del Carmen Del Río

== Judges ==
- Abril Cerbera – Fashion Designer
- Ivan Ramos – Plastic Surgeon
- Fernando Rosas – Esmas.com Representative
- Waldo Paredes – Image Designer
- Ana Karina Berlanga – Photographer
- Carlo Antonio Rico – Producer of Nuestra Belleza México
- Ana Laura Corral – Coordinator of Nuestra Belleza México

== Background Music ==
- Marconi

== Contestants ==
Hometown	Contestant
Saltillo	Cecilia Nallely Vázquez Aguirre
Saltillo	Ana Luisa Kuess Cano
Torreón	Adrián del Carmen García Rodríguez
Torreón	Ángela del Carmen Del Río Moncayo
Torreón	Claudia Ruth Cervantes Neave
Torreón	Giovanna Gutiérrez Navarro
Torreón	Sandra Alejandra Treviño Valdés
