= 2011–12 in the Mexican drug war =

In 2011 and 2012, during the Mexican drug war, hundreds of people were killed in massacres by rival drug cartels who were fighting for power and territory. These organized-crime syndicates were grappling for control over the drug corridors to the United States, the drug markets in local cities, extortion rackets, and human smuggling. Massacres occurred in the states of Veracruz, Sinaloa, Jalisco, Tamaulipas and Nuevo León.

== Incidents ==
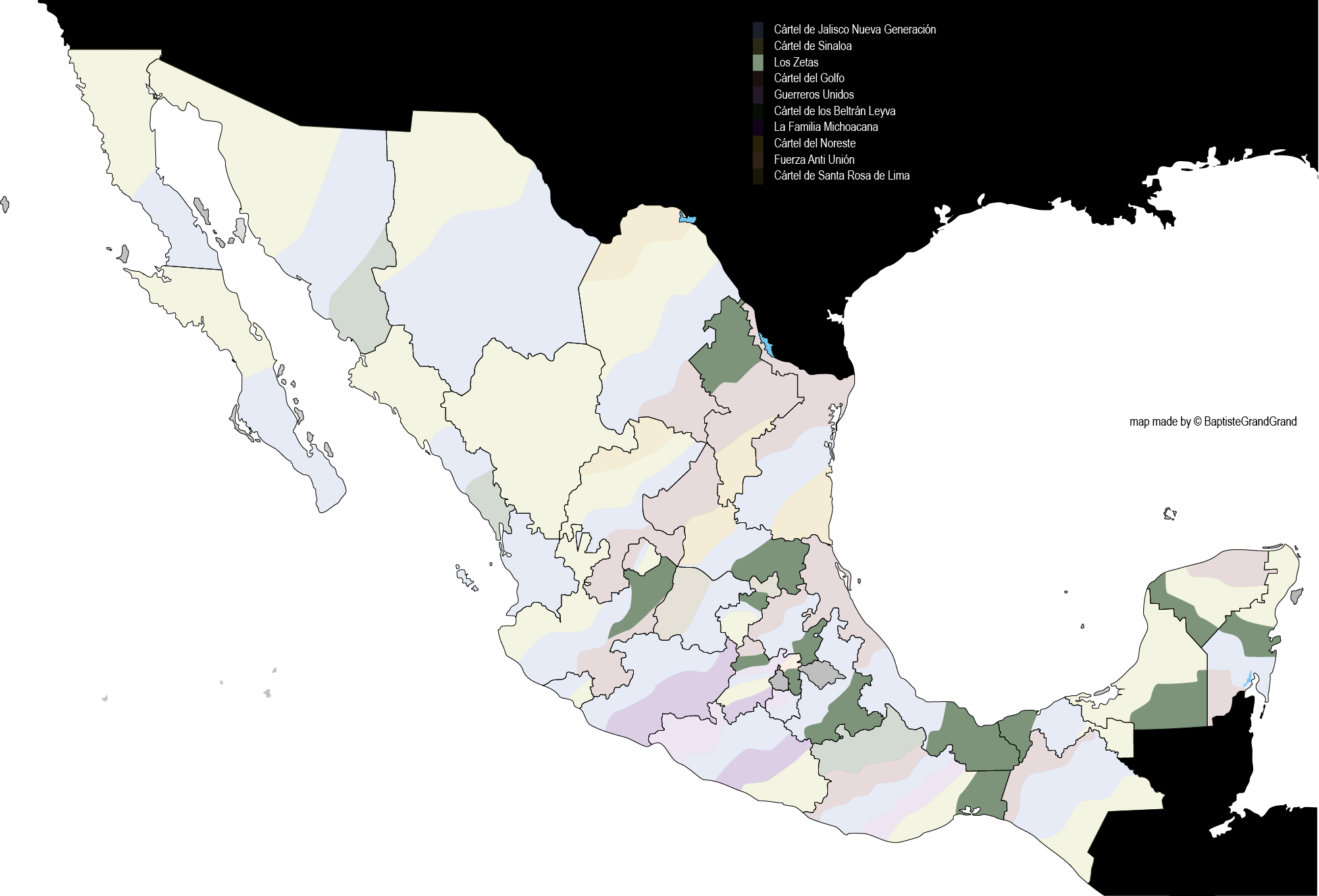
Los Zetas presence

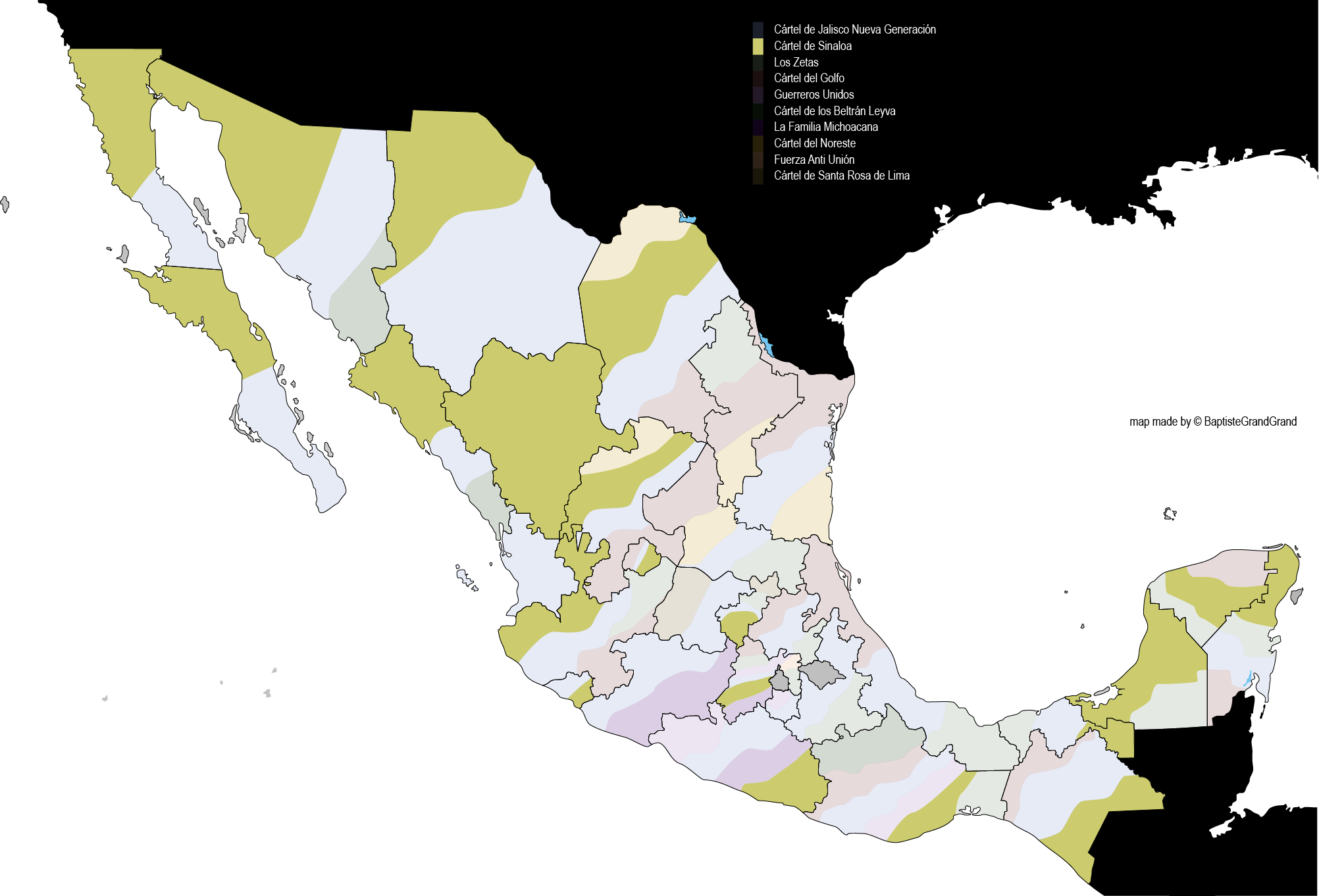
Sinaloa Cartel presence

Mexican organized-crime groups often leave bodies in public places as a warning to rivals. Most of the 2011–2012 massacres were committed by the rival Sinaloa and Los Zetas cartels throughout Mexico. The killings were described as "the latest salvo in a gruesome game of tit-for-tat in fighting" by Mexican drug cartels.

=== Veracruz ===
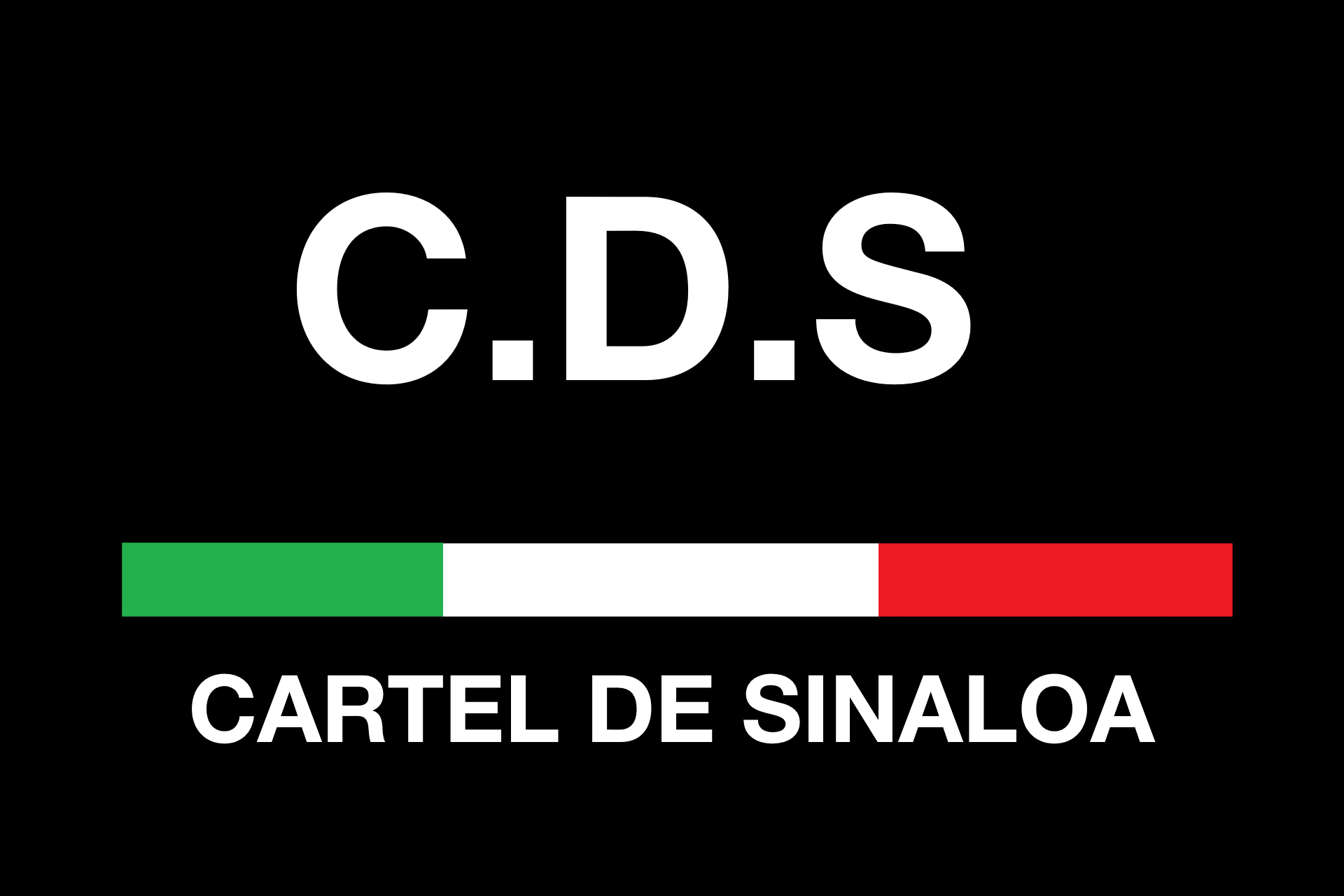
Sinaloa Cartel logo

Eye-for-an-eye fighting between Los Zetas and the Sinaloa Cartel began in the fall of 2011 in Veracruz, a strategic smuggling state with a large Gulf port. On 20 September, two trucks containing 35 bodies were found in an underpass near a shopping mall in Boca del Río. The bodies were allegedly members of Los Zetas, but it was later found that only six had been involved in minor crimes; none were involved with organized crime. Some of the victims had their hands tied, and showed signs of having been tortured. According to El Universal, at about 5:00 p.m. a number of vehicles blocked a major street in Boca del Río. When the traffic stopped, armed men abandoned two trucks in the middle of the road. They opened the truck doors and pulled out the thirty-five bodies, leaving a written message behind. Other gunmen pointed weapons at the frightened drivers before the cartel members fled the scene.

The Blog del Narco reported on September 21 that the message was signed by Gente Nueva, an enforcement group which worked for Sinaloa boss Joaquín Guzmán Loera. On 27 September the Jalisco New Generation Cartel released a video claiming that they had carried out the attacks on Los Zetas, however, and were planning to take over Veracruz.

On 6 October in Boca del Río, 36 bodies were found by authorities in three houses. Mexican Navy soldiers first discovered 20 bodies in a house in a residential neighbourhood; while searching another house, they found 11 more bodies. A third house contained one body, and four other bodies were confirmed by the Veracruz state government. A day later, Attorney General Reynaldo Escobar Pérez resigned due to the drug violence. A day after his resignation, 10 more bodies were found in the city of Veracruz. The Jalisco New Generation Cartel was responsible for 67 killings in Veracruz on 7 October.

On 11 June 2012 in Álamo, Veracruz, 14 dismembered bodies were abandoned in a truck on a highway near the Tamaulipas border. Alerted by an anonymous call, the bodies were found at 8:00 p.m. and authorities finished picking them up at about 7:00 a.m. the following day. Security was increased in the area after the discovery.

=== Sinaloa ===
In response to the killings in Veracruz, Los Zetas left 26 bodies (16 burned to death) in abandoned vehicles in Sinaloa on 23 November. Early that morning, a vehicle was discovered on fire in Culiacán. When police put out the fire, they found a dozen bodies burned to death, handcuffed, with wood on top of them. At 7:00 a.m., anonymous calls notified police that another vehicle in the north of the city was on fire. Four bodies, wearing bulletproof vests and handcuffed, were found inside. The following night, 10 more bodies were found in several municipalities.

On 5 June 2012, the bodies of seven men were dumped on a street in Culiacán in 13 plastic bags. Authorities initially thought that the victims were police officers because their clothing resembled that of a special-operations unit, but they concluded that the uniforms were not those of a police agency, A message was left behind by the killers blaming authorities for cooperating with Sinaloa Cartel boss Joaquín Guzmán Loera, also known as "El Chapo". and accusing President Felipe Calderón and state authorities of protecting the cartel. In 2010 and 2011, it was also claimed that the state government and police protected the cartel. The addition of bodies to the messages suggested that the killers were trying to attract more attention to alleged cartel-government collusion.

=== Jalisco ===
==== 2011 Guadalajara massacre ====
In response to the Sinaloa Cartel incursions, Los Zetas conducted a massacre in the state of Jalisco. On 24 November 2011, three trucks containing 26 male bodies were found on a main street in Guadalajara. All of them being male corpses. At about 7:00 pm, city police received several anonymous calls reporting that "several vehicles with more than 10 bodies had been abandoned" on a major thoroughfare. When police arrived, they found a green minivan in the middle lane of the highway; a cargo van was 66 feet (20 meters) away, and another van was in the right lane. Los Zetas and the Milenio Cartel were reportedly responsible for the massacre of the twenty-six alleged Sinaloa Cartel members.

==== 2012 Chapala massacre ====
Los Zetas responded to the 2012 Nuevo Laredo massacres by leaving the dismembered remains of 18 people in a Toyota Sienna and Ford EcoSport near U.S. retiree communities in Chapala, Jalisco, south of Guadalajara. Eighteen heads were found with the dismembered bodies; some had been frozen, others were covered with lime, and the rest were in an advanced state of decomposition. An anonymous call alerted police to the abandoned vehicles, which were found at the side of a highway early on the morning on 9 May 2012. The vehicles were towed to government offices to unload the bodies. Authorities confirmed that a message was left by the killers, presumably from Los Zetas and the Milenio Cartel.

=== Tamaulipas ===
==== 2011 San Fernando massacre ====
One hundred ninety-three people were killed by Los Zetas at the La Joya ranch in the municipality of San Fernando. Authorities investigating the massacre reported bus hijackings on Mexican Federal Highway 101 in San Fernando, and the kidnap victims were later killed and buried in 47 clandestine mass graves. The investigations began immediately after suitcases and other baggage were unclaimed in Reynosa and Matamoros. On 6 April 2011, authorities exhumed 59 bodies from eight mass graves; by 7 June, after several excavations, 193 bodies had been exhumed from mass graves in San Fernando.

==== 2012 Nuevo Laredo massacres ====
The dismembered remains of 14 men were found on 17 April 2012 in plastic bags inside a Chrysler Voyager in the border city of Nuevo Laredo. The victims were between the ages of 30 and 35. Authorities said that they found a "message signed by a criminal group," but did not release its contents or indicate if those killed were members of Los Zetas or the Gulf Cartel. According to CNN México, the message said that the group intended to "clean up Nuevo Laredo" by killing Zeta members. However, The Monitor reported that a source outside law enforcement but with knowledge of the attacks said that the bodies were those of Los Zetas members who had been killed by the Jalisco New Generation Cartel (a branch of the Sinaloa Cartel). After the attacks, Sinaloa Cartel boss Joaquín Guzmán Loera (better known as "El Chapo Guzmán") sent a message to Los Zetas that his cartel would fight for control of the Nuevo Laredo plaza.

Twenty-three bodies (14 decapitated and nine hanged from a bridge) were discovered in Nuevo Laredo in an escalation of violence by rival drug gangs on the U.S. border. At about 1:00 a.m. on 4 May 2012, nine people were hanged from a bridge on Federal Highway 85D with a message left by the killers. Motorists found the bodies of four women and five men. The message left behind reportedly said that the victims were the perpetrators of a 24 April car bombing in the city. The victims were reportedly members of the Gulf Cartel who were killed by Los Zetas for "heating up" their territory. Hours later, 14 decapitated bodies were abandoned inside a vehicle in front of the customs agency; their severed heads were in coolers in front of the municipal building. Police said that the second massacre may have been revenge by the Gulf Cartel to Los Zetas for the earlier killings. With the bodies was a message, reportedly signed by El Chapo, demanding that Nuevo Laredo mayor Benjamín Galván and other municipal and state leaders and public-safety officials recognize his and the Sinaloa Cartel's presence in the region.

==== 2012 Ciudad Mante massacres ====
During the afternoon of 7 June 2012, outside the Ciudad Mante city hall, 14 mutilated bodies were discovered in a parked truck. Ciudad Mante, 250 miles south of Texas, is a sugar-cane-growing community with nearly 110,000 people. Investigators said that the victims (11 men and three women) were found with a message. According to Proceso magazine, the message was from the Sinaloa Cartel to Los Zetas (which controlled the city's drug trafficking). Milenio confirmed that the Gulf Cartel had killed the 14 people, allegedly members of Los Zetas, as retaliation for grenade attacks in Matamoros (Gulf Cartel headquarters). The Blog del Narco posted a video on its website from an anonymous source.

In response to the Gulf Cartel attacks, Los Zetas left 14 mutilated bodies in an abandoned bus in a Ciudad Mante shopping-center parking lot. The bodies of ten men and four women, reported at about 9 a.m. on 23 June 2012, were left with a message to the Gulf Cartel which was not revealed by authorities. The bodies were discovered a day after grenade attacks in the capital city of Ciudad Victoria injured eight people.

=== Nuevo León ===
==== 2012 Apodaca prison riot ====
On 19 February 2012, at a prison in Apodaca, at least 44 people were killed and 12 injured. Blog del Narco, an anonymous blog documenting the Mexican drug war, reported that the actual death toll might be over 70. The riot involved Los Zetas and the Gulf Cartel, which operate in northeastern Mexico. Nuevo León governor Rodrigo Medina said on 20 February 2012 that 30 prisoners escaped during the riot, but the number was reduced to 29 four days later. On 16 March, the Nuevo León attorney general's office said that 37 prisoners had escaped on the day of the massacre. One of the fugitives, Óscar Manuel Bernal (known as "La Araña", or the Spider), was considered by authorities to be "extremely dangerous" and was believed to be the leader of Los Zetas in Monterrey Municipality. Other fugitives were leaders of the cartel.

==== 2012 Cadereyta Jiménez massacre ====
On 13 May 2012 on Federal Highway 40 in the city of Cadereyta Jiménez, 49 people were decapitated and mutilated by members of Los Zetas and dumped on a roadside near the city of Monterrey in northern Mexico. The bodies were found in the town of San Juan in Cadereyta Jiménez at about 4 a.m. on a highway leading to Reynosa. The forty-three male and six female victims had their heads, feet, and hands cut off, making identification difficult. With signs of torture, they were stuffed in plastic bags. Four days before the massacre, 18 people were found decapitated and dismembered near Guadalajara (Mexico's second-largest city). The massacre echoed others conducted by drug cartels. Authorities blamed much of the violence on Los Zetas (a cartel set up by commandos who deserted from the Mexican Army during the 1990s) and the Sinaloa Cartel, headed by Joaquín "El Chapo" Guzmán.

== See also ==
- List of massacres in Mexico
- Infighting in the Gulf Cartel
