= Cadereyta =

Cadereyta may refer to the following places in Mexico:

- Cadereyta de Montes, Querétaro
- Cadereyta Jiménez, Nuevo León
  - Cadereyta Jiménez massacre
