= Sergio Villarreal Barragán =

Mexican drug trafficker

Sergio Enrique Villarreal Barragán
- Born: September 21, 1969 (age 57); Torreón, Coahuila, Mexico
- Other name: "El Grande"
- Occupation: Leader of the Beltrán Leyva Cartel
- Height: 6 ft 8 in (203 cm)
- Status: Extradited to the United States

Sergio Enrique Villarreal Barragán, a.k.a. El Grande (born September 21, 1969), is a Mexican former federal police officer who then worked as a lieutenant for Arturo Beltrán Leyva of the criminal organization called the Beltrán Leyva Cartel. He got his name El Grande ("The Big One") because of his height.

== Biography ==
Villarreal Barragán was born in Torreón, Coahuila on September 21, 1969. He began his criminal career as a car thief in the state of Coahuila, and in 1990 at age 20, he was admitted to the Coahuila Judicial Police force. Several years later in 1993, he was admitted to the Federal Police, which was led by the office National Security Commission and was stationed at Nuevo Laredo. Villarreal Barragán was then stationed at Reynosa, Tamaulipas, where he worked until 1996, when he established a business relationship with the Juárez Cartel. Between the years 2007 and 2010, Villarreal Barragán left the Juárez organization to work along with the Gulf Cartel and for Los Zetas, but later incorporated into the Sinaloa Cartel, commanding a criminal cell of the Beltrán Leyva Cartel.

=== Beltrán Leyva Cartel ===
Allegedly, he was hired by the Beltrán Leyva Cartel and by 2007 he rose to the rank of lieutenant for Arturo Beltrán Leyva. Following Arturo's death in December 2009 during a shootout with Marines, infighting broke out for the control of the Beltrán Leyva Cartel. One faction is led by lieutenants Édgar Valdez Villarreal and Gerardo Alvarez-Vazquez, while the other is led by the current cartel leader Héctor Beltrán Leyva and his 'enforcer' lieutenant, Sergio Villarreal Barragán.

== Kingpin Act sanction ==
On 1 June 2010, the United States Department of the Treasury sanctioned Villarreal Barragán under the Foreign Narcotics Kingpin Designation Act (sometimes referred to simply as the "Kingpin Act"), for his involvement in drug trafficking along with four other international criminals. The act prohibited U.S. citizens and companies from doing any kind of business activity with him, and virtually froze all his assets in the U.S.

== Bounty and arrest ==
On September 12, 2010, he was arrested in a raid by Mexican Marines in the central state of Puebla. Villarreal has been charged with multiple murders and other crimes. The Mexican government had been offering a $30 million pesos (US$1.7 million) bounty for information leading to Villarreal's capture.

Villarreal Barragán was extradited to the United States on 23 May 2012, and may possibly serve as a "protected witness" for the DEA.

== Personal life ==
Villarreal Barragán is married to Gabriela Benavides Tamez and has a brother named Adolfo Villarreal Barragán.

== See also ==
- Mérida Initiative
- Mexican drug war
- List of Mexico's 37 most-wanted drug lords
