= Gerardo Alvarez-Vazquez =

Mexican drug trafficker

José Gerardo Álvarez-Vázquez
- Born: November 3, 1963 (age 62), September 24, 1965 (age 60) or May 10, 1966 (age 59); Las Avilas, Teloloapan, Guerrero, Mexico
- Other names: El Indio, El Chayán.
- Occupation: Cartel lieutenant
- Employer: Los Negros

Notes
- $ 2 million USD bounty. Arrested on April 21, 2010.

José Gerardo Álvarez-Vázquez (aka: El Indio or El Chayán) is a Mexican drug trafficker who worked for the Beltrán-Leyva Cartel and then for Édgar Valdez Villarreal's criminal organization known as Los Negros. In 2008, the United States government offered a $2 million reward for his capture.

== Drug trafficking ==
According to Mexican federal authorities, Álvarez Vázquez presumably controlled the transport of drugs in the State of Mexico as well in the state of Guerrero. It is said that he fought for the leadership for the organization against Héctor Beltrán Leyva and Sergio Villarreal Barragán with the help of Edgar Valdez Villarreal. He was also in charge of some routes for the transport of drugs to the U.S. on behalf of the Beltrán Leyva and Sinaloa Cartels.

== Kingpin Act sanction ==
On 2 October 2008, the United States Department of the Treasury sanctioned Álvarez Vázquez under the Foreign Narcotics Kingpin Designation Act (sometimes referred to simply as the "Kingpin Act"), for his involvement in drug trafficking along with nine other international criminals and six entities. The act prohibited U.S. citizens and companies from doing any kind of business activity with him, and virtually froze all his assets in the U.S.

== Capture ==
On April 21, 2010, the Mexican military raided a household in Huixquilucan; during the raid, troops were met with gunfire from cartel gunmen. After the gunfight, soldiers cordoned off the zone which led to the capture of Gerardo Alvarez-Vázquez.
