= 2015 Baku residence building fire =

Fire in Baku, Azerbaijan

2015 Baku Residence Building Fire
- Date: May 19, 2015
- Time: around 10:00 Baku Time (06:00 GMT)
- Location: Binagadi raion, Baku, Azerbaijan; 40°25′30.1″N 49°50′20.9″E
- Cause: flammable facade material
- Deaths: 15
- Injuries: 63

The 2015 Baku residence building fire occurred on 19 May 2015 in a 16-level residence building located at Azadlig Avenue 200/36 in Binagadi raion of Baku, Azerbaijan. The official death toll from the fire was 15, of whom five were children; at least 63 people were injured. Most of the dead were killed by toxic smoke as the building caught fire. It took firefighters three hours to extinguish the fire.

== Overview ==
The disaster led to severe outrage among the population and provoked discussions around the material used in the renovation of the facade of more than 200 apartment blocks in Baku built in the Soviet period. Flammable Styrofoam facing had been installed on the exterior of old buildings as part of Baku's "beautification" scheme. Consequently, the city officials started the process of removing the facade of the buildings where the material causing the fire was used. In some extreme cases, residents used hammers and their hands to remove the material from their buildings.

A similar fire had erupted in Baku about a month earlier, on 10 April 2015, but there were no injuries. The reason for both of the fires is indicated as low-quality flammable facade material used in the renovation.

== See also ==
- 2018 Baku fire
- Grenfell Tower fire
