= Roberto Javier Mora García =

Mexican crime journalist and murder victim

- Born: c. 1962; Saltillo, Coahuila, Mexico
- Died: 19 March 2004 (aged 42); Nuevo Laredo, Tamaulipas, Mexico
- Cause of death: Stabbing
- Education: Monterrey Institute of Technology and Higher Education
- Occupation: El Mañana editorial director

Roberto Javier Mora García (c. 1962 – 16 March 2004) was a Mexican journalist and editorial director of El Mañana, a newspaper based in Nuevo Laredo, Tamaulipas, Mexico. He worked for a number of media outlets in Mexico, including the El Norte and El Diario de Monterrey, prior to his assassination.

While on his way home from work, Mora García was stabbed to death 26 times. Two men were eventually arrested and charged with the killing, but a number of independent organizations have complained on the irregularities and coverups in the investigation. They believe that Mora García was killed for his extensive coverage on the Mexican drug cartels, political corruption, and organized crime, but the motive of his assassination is still unsolved.

== Early life and career ==
Mora García was born in the Mexican city of Saltillo, Coahuila. He studied at the Monterrey Institute of Technology and Higher Education (ITESM) under a scholarship for academic excellence until he graduated in 1983. At the age of 22, he began his career as a news reporter, and he later went on to work as an editor for El Norte daily newspaper and as the director of El Diario de Monterrey (now known as Milenio).

In 2000, Mora García began to work for El Mañana, a Spanish-language newspaper from the border city of Nuevo Laredo, Tamaulipas, where he later became the director. He also wrote for Biznews, a distribution magazine based in northern Mexico and in the Rio Grande Valley, and for the North Mexico Business, a local weekly economics newspaper.

His work encompassed a serious coverage of the Mexican authorities relationship with the Gulf Cartel, a drug cartel based in Tamaulipas. Many of the articles he wrote talked about law enforcement involvement in drug trafficking, and the role former policemen had with Los Zetas in the extortion business. He was also a harsh critic of the former governor Tomás Yarrington and of the Tamaulipas attorney general Francisco Cayuela Villarreal. In El Mañana, Mora García criticized the local government for reportedly altering the homicide rate statistics in Nuevo Laredo; he argued that the authorities claimed some homicide victims had either committed suicide or died of a disease. When writing on the local drug trade, Mora García referred to drug traffickers by their real names.

== Assassination ==
As Mora García (aged 42) was coming back from work before dawn on 19 March 2004, an assassin stabbed him 26 times until he died outside his home at the Colonia Jardín neighborhood in the Mexican city of Nuevo Laredo, Tamaulipas. He was stabbed 13 times in the back and 13 times in the chest with a double-edge knife (which struck his lungs and heart). His corpse was found by the police officers Bernardino Cruz Catarina and Guadalupe Herver 15 meters (49 feet) away from his vehicle, which had the door open and the keys in the ignition.

On March 28, the Mexican police arrested two men, and accused them of assassinating Mora García, their neighbor. Both men confessed to having killed the journalist, but later stated that they had been tortured by the police to admit their culpability. Later on inside a prison on May 13, the American citizen Medina Vázquez was stabbed 88 times and killed, prompting questions and raising doubts from several journalists and free press organizations on a supposed cover up for the assassination of Mora Garcia as a "crime of passion" in order to hide the real motives behind it. Six independent organizations that investigated the crime concluded that there were many irregularities and coverups in the investigation. The former Attorney General of the state of Tamaulipas, Francisco Cayuela Villarreal, then resigned after an accusation of being an accomplice.

Mora García wrote extensively on the Gulf Cartel, a Mexican drug trafficking organization, and its ties with the local government. The motives behind the assassination of Mora García still remain unsolved, but neither the Mexican authorities nor investigators have discarded the possibility that the attack was work-related and driven by his coverage on drug trafficking, police corruption, government-drug cartel collusion, and impunity.

== See also ==
- Mexican drug war
- 2012 Nuevo Laredo massacres
- List of journalists killed in Mexico
