= Drug corridor =

Drug trafficking route

A drug corridor is a commonly used drug trafficking route that allows for the flow of illicit drugs . The term is often used as a reference to common drug trafficking routes that often flow through major cities. There are no definite drug corridors, but rather a series of connected networks which span across the globe. Drug corridors are reported to have a growing impact on drug use and associated crime along routes drug traffickers are known to travel. One well known drug corridor in the Americas is the Trans-American Corridor.

== Trans-American corridor ==
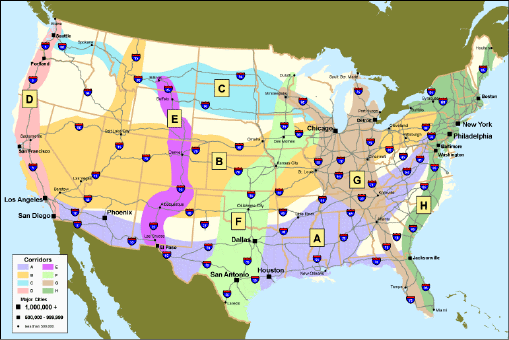
2006 map of the eight principal drug corridors in the United States

Inhabitants of the lower Midwest and South, including Missouri, Arkansas, Tennessee, Kentucky, and the Carolinas, generally dub their locations to be part of the main trans-American drug corridor, as well as those of the Southwestern U.S. states such as Arizona, New Mexico and Texas. They claim that the major flow of drugs brought in from the Atlantic coast westward flows through their states and that they are in the main drug corridor.
