= El Mañana (Nuevo Laredo) =

Newspaper in Mexico

- Type: Daily newspaper
- Format: Broadsheet
- Owner: Heriberto Deandar Amador
- Founded: 1924
- Headquarters: Nuevo Laredo, Tamaulipas, Mexico
- Website: http://elmanana.com.mx

El Mañana (Early Morning) is a Spanish language newspaper published in Nuevo Laredo, Tamaulipas, Mexico. The newspaper was founded in 1924 by Heriberto Deandar Amador, it is Nuevo Laredo's oldest newspaper currently still published. El Mañana uses the slogan "La verdad sin fronteras" ("The truth without boundaries"). El Mañana is also circulated in Laredo, Texas, United States.

== Drug cartel attacks ==
On 19 March 2004, the journalist Roberto Javier Mora García was stabbed 29 times outside his home in Nuevo Laredo. On 6 February 2006, two armed men broke into the offices of El Mañana and detonated a grenade. They also shot the outside walls of the installation with AK-47s and AR-15s before fleeing the scene. According to La Jornada, the armed men shot the installation more than 100 times, injuring Jaime Orozco Tey, a journalist. On 30 July 2010, a group of armed men in a vehicle threw a grenade at the offices of Televisa in Nuevo Laredo, damaging two vehicles. On 26 September 2011, Elizabeth Macias-Castro, an editor of la Primera Hora newspaper, was decapitated; a note was left behind by Los Zetas, claiming responsibility for the killing. A group of armed men attacked the offices of El Mañana newspaper in Nuevo Laredo at around 23:00 hours on 11 May 2012. The Mexican authorities stated that no one was injured in the 5-minute shootout, but the offices and some vehicles were damaged when bullets impacted from the outside. When the employees of El Mañana heard the detonations, they threw themselves on the floor, while others suffered nervous breakdowns. Some witnesses said that they heard grenade explosions during the attack. In addition, a message was reportedly left behind by the perpetrators.

Due to the violent attacks the press has received in Nuevo Laredo, news media have practiced "self-censorship," where local journalist prefer to silence the press and refuse to report on important incidents for fears of reprisals by the cartels. Events that would go on the front-page of any newspaper—mass murders with over six dead, shooting incidents wounding three soldiers—often go unreported in Nuevo Laredo. The cartels want the cities they control to appear calm in order to prevent the government from sending federal troops. Consequently, the press, tired of extortions and death threats, prefers to silence because there is no guarantee for their safety. On 14 May 2012, El Mañana declared that it will no longer report on news relating to drug-violence.

On 14 May 2013, the newspaper suffered a cyber-attack on its official website. According to El Mañana, the attacks are intended to saturate the page and damage information databases of the newspaper, particularly in columns where they question the performance of local officials.

== The Laredo Sun ==
El Mañana also heads an online English-language news site called Laredo Sun. A printed newspaper with the same name was launched in Laredo in 1999 but failed to compete with Laredo's main newspaper, the Laredo Morning Times, and fell out of print almost immediately. The Laredo Sun now operates solely online as an English-language news source for readers in Laredo, Texas, and the surrounding community.

== Rio Magazine ==
Rio is a young and fresh English-language biweekly magazine covering events, news, nightlife, culture and exclusive interviews in Laredo, Texas. Started in 2005 as part of the official newspaper package, the magazine is run by El Mañana de Nuevo Laredo. Charged with revamping and growing the magazine, a new editor, Rafael Benavides, changed the magazine from a Spanish-language black and white magazine with a small and established demographic in Nuevo Laredo, to a full-color English-language magazine in 2010 for readers and audiences in Laredo, Texas. The magazine was El Mañana's first successful English-language product.

== Femina Magazine ==
Femina is a Spanish-language biweekly women's magazine in Nuevo Laredo, Tamaulipas, and Laredo, Texas. The magazine celebrated its 25th anniversary in 2012.

== See also ==
- List of newspapers in Mexico
