= La Barbie =

Mexican-American drug lord

Edgar Valdez Villarreal
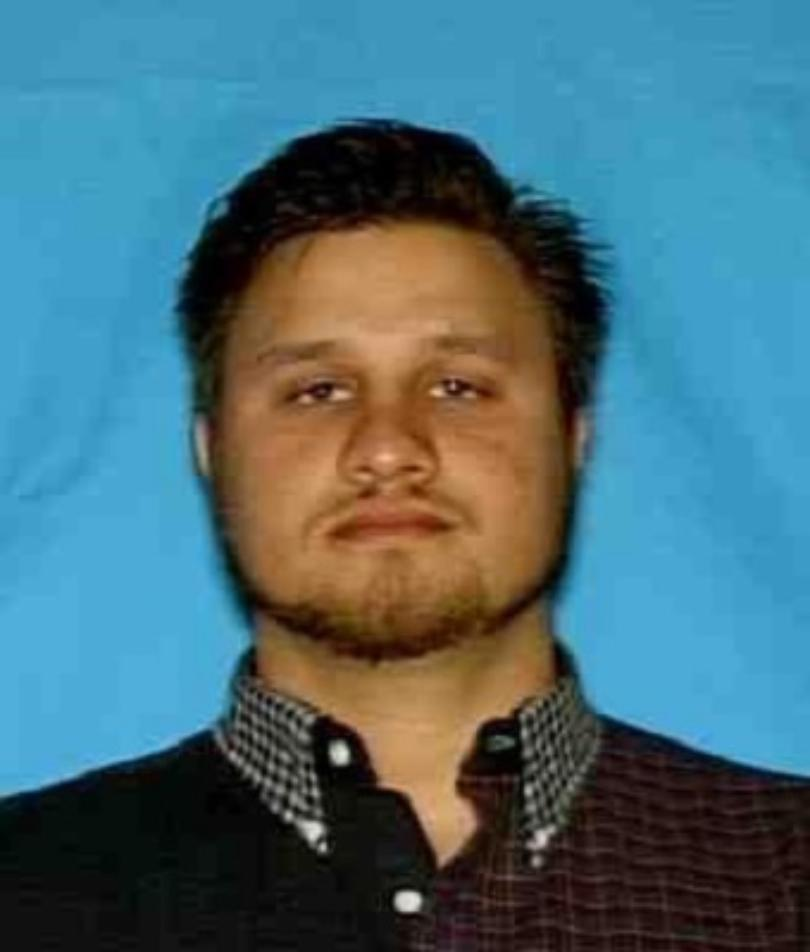
- Villarreal in the 2000s
- Born: August 11, 1973 (age 53); Laredo, Texas, U.S.
- Other names: La Barbie; El Comandante; El Güero
- Occupation: Drug lord
- Children: Édgar Valdéz Beltrán
- Parent: Abel Valdez Villarreal
- Status: Incarcerated
- Allegiance: Beltrán-Leyva Cartel
- Convictions: Conspiracy to import more than 5 kilograms of cocaine (21 U.S.C. §§ 952, 960, and 963); Conspiracy to distribute more than 5 kilograms of cocaine (21 U.S.C. §§ 959, 960, and 963); Money laundering (18 U.S.C. § 1956)
- Penalty: 49 years imprisonment

Details
- Date apprehended: August 30, 2010
- Imprisoned at: USP Coleman II

Edgar Valdez Villarreal (born August 11, 1973), commonly known as La Barbie ("The Barbie"), is a Mexican-American former drug lord and high-ranking lieutenant of the Beltrán Leyva Cartel. Valdez is serving a 49-year prison sentence at USP Coleman II in Florida.

Valdez worked for several years as a Mexican cartel lieutenant alongside nephew Fernando Valdez, before rising to a leadership position in an enforcement squad called Los Negros. Following the death of cartel boss Arturo Beltrán Leyva in late 2009, Valdez fought a protracted gang war for control of the cartel resulting in over 150 deaths. He employed techniques such as videotaped torture and decapitation.

On August 30, 2010, he was arrested by Mexican Federal Police at a rural house near Mexico City. His gang, known as Los Negros, collapsed by 2011. He is intended to serve a 49-year sentence as inmate 05658-748 at USP Coleman II, a high-security US federal prison in Florida.

== Biography ==
Valdez was born and raised in Laredo, Texas. He was a popular high school football player. His nickname La Barbie came from his American football coach at United High School; because of his blond hair and blue eyes, he was compared to a Ken doll.

Valdez's first arrest came at the age of 19 in Texas, where he was charged with criminally negligent homicide for running over a middle-school counselor with his truck while speeding down a Laredo street. He was not indicted. He became a marijuana dealer on the streets of Laredo while he was in high school. He turned down his father's offer of financing a college education in order to focus on his business, but was soon indicted on charges of distributing marijuana. To avoid capture he fled to Mexico, where he allegedly joined the Beltrán-Leyva Cartel and quickly moved up through the ranks due to his connections in the US.

He collaborated with both the DEA and the FBI while working as a drug trafficker.

== Los Negros ==
Valdez came to lead the enforcement gang called Los Negros, who were engaged in a territorial dispute in the Nuevo Laredo region against Los Zetas. Los Negros orchestrated kidnappings and recruited operatives, including corrupt police officers, military personnel and federal agents, according to the attorney general's office. While the group was allegedly controlled directly by Valdez, it used to be overseen by the Beltrán-Leyva Cartel.

According to Mexican media reports, shortly after the death of cartel leader Arturo Beltrán Leyva on December 16, 2009, Valdez began to dispute the cartel's leadership and its territory; in 2010 one faction was led by Valdez and Gerardo Alvarez-Vasquez, while the other was led by Arturo's brother Héctor Beltrán Leyva and his lieutenant Sergio Villarreal Barragán.

In August 22 of 2010 four decapitated bodies were found hanging from a bridge in Cuernavaca, along with a message warning anyone helping Valdez of a similar fate. Both sides engaged in similarly gruesome tactics intended to ward off the other; over 150 deaths are allegedly linked to the dispute.

US government reports allege that Los Negros has been known to employ local gangs such as MS-13 and the Mexican Mafia to carry out murders and other illegal activities.

== Connection with the Cabañas Case ==
On the morning of January 25, 2010, football player Salvador Cabañas was wounded by a gunshot to the head. Through the recording of a CCTV camera, José Jorge ("JJ") Balderas Garza was identified as his attacker. According to his own statements, due to their friendship Valdez-Villarreal himself was the person who gave "JJ" shelter to protect him from the police by placing him in one of his safe houses.

== Connection with the Israeli crime organization ==
Benjamin Yeshurun Sutchi was killed in Mexico by the CJNG cartel in July 2019. A well-known Israeli drug dealer and a major player in the international cocaine business, Sutchi was wanted by Interpol and was one of the best friends of Edgar Valdez Villarreal. Mexico’s attorney general said that between 2001 and 2005 Sutchi built a criminal empire based on drug trafficking, kidnappings and casinos, working with Mexico’s own mafia. In a raid, police found photos showing Sutchi together with his friend Valdez in Sinaloa.

== Charges and allegations ==
Mexican police had been searching for Valdez since his 2002 indictment on two counts of conspiracy with intent to distribute marijuana. In their investigation, police raided homes that he had rented, locating grenades, automatic weapons and police uniforms. In May 2009 Mexican authorities listed him as one of their 24 most wanted drug traffickers, and posted a 30-million-peso (US$2.3 million) reward for information leading to his capture.

Valdez pleaded not guilty and took out advertising in the local Monterrey newspaper, El Norte, describing himself as: "a legitimate businessman who had been forced to leave Nuevo Laredo and move to the neighboring state of Coahuila because he was being harassed for bribes by local police officers."

In June 2010 Valdez was indicted in a US court on charges of trafficking thousands of kilograms of cocaine from Mexico into the US between 2004-06. Mexican officials claim that Valdez introduced to the US about one ton of cocaine per month. In 2009 the Justice Department posted a $2 million reward for information leading to his capture.

== Arrest ==
Mexican police said they tracked Valdez across five Mexican states for a year, a pursuit that intensified in the final months as they raided home after home owned by the drug lord, missing him but arresting several of his allies. On August 30, 2010, Valdez was captured by Mexican Federal Police near Mexico City.

In a video released by the federal police on September 1, 2010, Valdez could be seen telling his interrogators how he smuggled drugs from Panama to the US and transported cash from the US back into Mexico hidden in trailers. He said that he spent $200,000 to make a film based on his life; however, he decided not to release the movie because it might reveal too much information about him. After Valdez' arrest, his father-in-law, Carlos Montemayor González, (a.k.a., El Charro) took control of the cartel, only to be arrested three months later on November 24, 2010.

His American lawyer told The New York Times that Valdez denies all charges against him and that the video confession was made under duress. In November 2010 Mexico started his extradition process to the US.

== Extradition ==
On September 30, 2015, Valdez Villarreal was extradited to the US along with 12 other criminals, including former high-ranking Gulf Cartel leader Jorge Eduardo Costilla Sánchez. In June 2018 he was sentenced to 49 years in federal prison. In November 2022, Borderland Beat reported that Valdez Villarreal was no longer in Bureau of Prisons custody. After being pressed by the Government of Mexico on November 30, 2022 as to why Valdez Villarreal was no longer listed as in Federal Prison custody, the U.S. Bureau of Federal Prisons claimed that "We do not provide specific information on the status of inmates who are not in the custody of the BOP for safety, security, or privacy reasons," but also that "Inmates who were previously in BOP custody and who have not completed their sentence may be outside BOP custody for a period of time for court hearings, medical treatment or for other reasons." Mexican President Andrés Manuel López Obrador referenced Borderland Beat's story, stating in a press conference that he believed Borderland Beat received the information in a leak.

== In popular culture ==
A character loosely based on Valdez Villarreal, named "La muñeca" ("The Doll"), was featured in the 2017 TV series "El Chapo".

== Pending film ==
In 2011 Legendary Pictures acquired the rights to film American Drug Lord, a movie about Valdez based on an article in Rolling Stone magazine. Charlie Hunnam, who is best known for his role as Jax Teller in the TV crime-drama Sons of Anarchy, is scheduled to play the crime figure. In January 2016, it was revealed that since 2013 the controversial American actor Armie Hammer contacted the family of the infamous cartel leader "La Barbie" (Valdez-Villarreal) and secured the rights to film the life story of the drug lord.

== See also ==
- List of Mexico's 37 most-wanted drug lords
- Mexican drug war
- History of the Mexican-Americans in Texas
