= Esmas.com =

Website for a Mexican television network

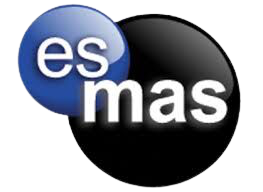
The Esmas.com logo

esmas.com was the portal of Televisa, the largest Mexican television network and the world's largest producer of Spanish language media. The website was registered under Comercio Mas and was launched by Grupo Televisa in 2000. Previously, the official website of Televisa was televisa.com. As of 2022, the website redirects to Televisa's news website, Noticieros Televisa.

== Website description ==
This website hosted the official webpages of all of the programs it produced and the site was included at the end of the credits of every show. The content of esmas.com was entirely in Spanish. The domain name esmas.com was also used for the e-mail addresses for the television shows and their staff members.

== Services ==
The sites offer a shopping, dating, classifieds, fanclubs sites as well as horoscopes, chatrooms, chats with celebrities, e-mail, bulletin boards, promotions, video galleries, photo galleries and polls.

In 2004, Esmas launched Esmas Móvil a service through which mobile phone users can receive information about entertainment 24 hours a day. Users can also download wallpapers for their phones. In 2005, the service was expanded to the United States, Ecuador and Chile.

== Sections ==
- Deportes – Sports powered by Televisa Deportes
- Futbol – Football (soccer)
- Espectáculos – Showbusiness
- Noticieros – News powered by Noticieros Televisa
- Niños – Children
- Mujer – Women
- Salud – Health
- Telenovelas – Telenovelas

== See also ==
- univision.com of Univisión in the United States
- terra.com of Terra Networks in Spain
