= Blog del Narco =

Citizen journalism website documenting the Mexican drug war

El Blog del Narco
- Type: Blog, Online newspaper, Internet forum
- Founder: Anonymous
- Founded: 2 March 2010
- Language: Spanish
- Website: www.elblogdelnarco.com

Blog del Narco (Narco's Blog) is a citizen journalism blog that attempts to document the events of the Mexican drug war, primarily those not reported by the government of Mexico or the Mexican news media.

== History ==
An anonymous person created the website because the government was not reporting the violence and was trying to pretend that "nothing [was] happening", the media was "intimidated", and the "government had apparently been bought."

The author would initially spend four hours every day working on the website. To deal with the increased workload, he asked a friend, also anonymous, to help him. They decided to broadcast their content without alteration or modifications of convenience—and help Mexicans take all necessary precautions to protect their own well-being. They chose YouTube to upload videos to the web and comment as @mundonarco on Twitter. During the early days of Blog del Narco, the general population of Mexico submitted only a small number of reports to them, but as the website built trust with time, more reports were submitted. The creators and current editors of the blog "have not received any threats yet."

In 2011, a video posted on the blog outlined a prison warden's system of letting prisoners free at night so they could commit murders for drug cartels. As a result of the video, the prison warden was arrested.

In May 2013, it was revealed that one of the authors of the blog was a woman in her early 20s who goes by the pseudonym "Lucy." In early May, Lucy fled Mexico for the United States (Texas), then Spain.

== Editorial ==
Some of the videos posted on the website show incidents of murder and torture.

In Mexico, many traditional journalistic outlets have been threatened and harassed due to stories about the drug trafficking industry they dared publish, so anonymous blogs like Blog del Narco have taken the role of reporting on events related to the drug war. The author uses computer security techniques to obscure his identity. His anonymity has been maintained. When he conducted an interview with the Associated Press, he used a disguised telephone number. The author of the blog said that he is doing a service by publishing sensitive details about the Mexican drug war that journalist organizations in Mexico are hesitant to publish for fear of retaliation. The blogger said, "for the scanty details that they (mass media) put on television, they get grenades thrown at them and their reporters kidnapped. We publish everything. Imagine what they could do to us."

As of September 2010, the blog had three million unique monthly views. By 2011, it became one of the most visited websites in Mexico. Members of police and drug cartel groups directly read the blog.

== Reception ==
MSNBC described Blog del Narco as "Mexico's go-to Web site on information on the country's drug war." Additionally, The Houston Chronicle said that Blog del Narco is "a gritty, front-row seat to Mexico's drug war."

The Guardian and Los Angeles Times noted that Blog del Narco is a response to Mexico's "narco-censorship", a term used when reporters and editors of the Mexican drug war, out of fear or caution, are forced to either write what the drug lords demand, or remain silent by not writing anything at all. If they do not comply with what the drug cartels demand, the journalists may be kidnapped, intimidated, or even killed.

Spencer Ackerman of Wired said, "even if you don't read Spanish (like me), the images on Blog Del Narco tell the gruesome story. Old, wealthy men held hostage and humiliated. Paramilitary cops in ski masks taking dudes into custody. People walking the streets in body armor, automatic weapons out. Then there's all the dead bodies and shot-up cars."

Jo Tuckman of Dawn said that the website's contents are "a catalogue of horror absent even from the national press, which still covers the violence from the relative safety of its headquarters in the capital."

Duncan Robinson of the New Statesman said "To say that the blog's coverage is raw is an understatement. It is visceral and undigested. This is news unprocessed, unadulterated and uncensored. Where a news editor would cut away, Blog del Narco's footage lingers. Decapitations are not described, they are pictured. It's unapologetically violent. The blog's raison d'être is simple: to reflect what is happening."

Nate Freeman of Observer said "his facelessness allowed him get away with stories that would endanger known journalists[...]"

== See also ==
- Borderland Beat
