= Crime in Mexico =

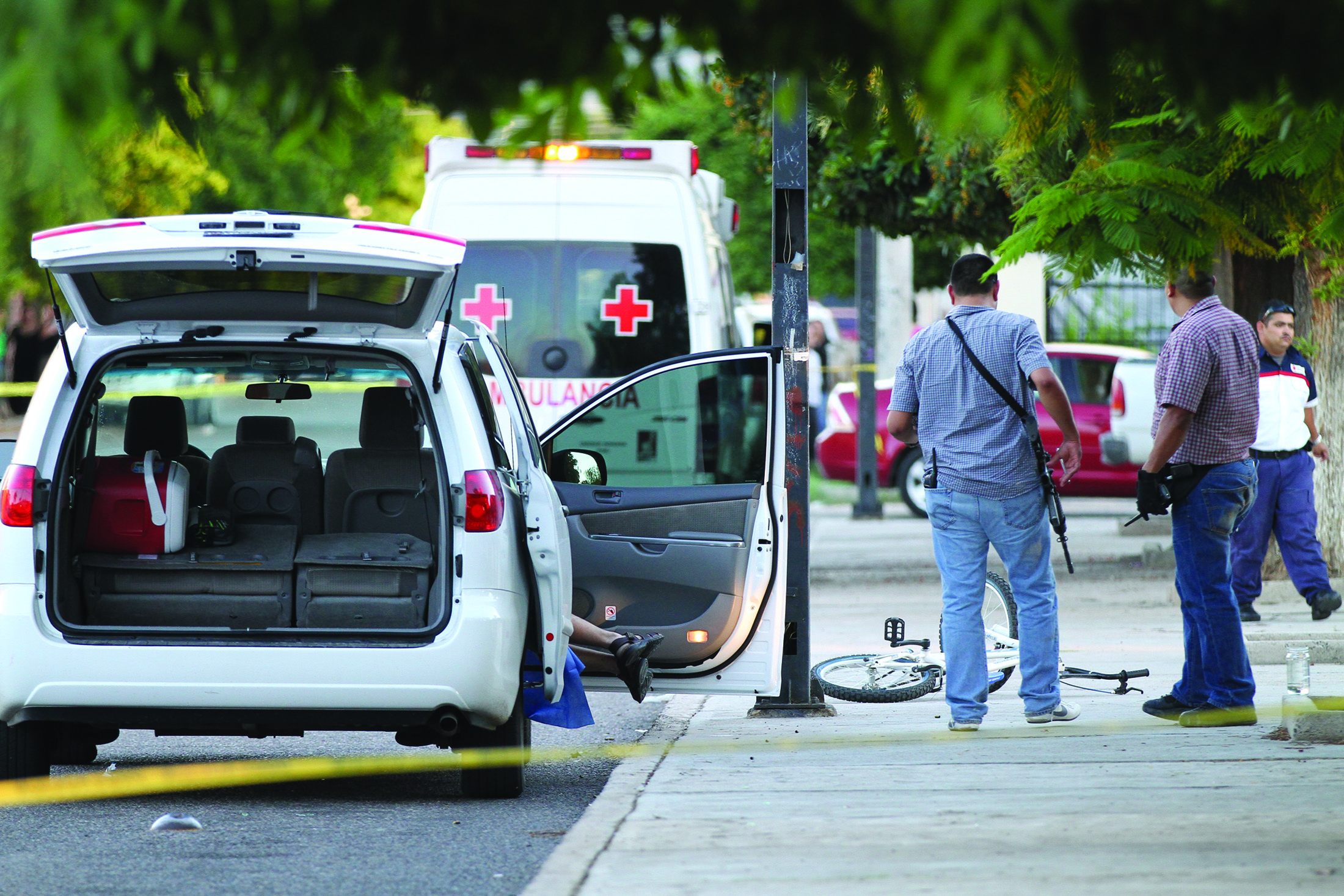
- Police investigate a murder scene in Hermosillo.
- Homicide: 24.859 (2023)
- Assault: 47.7 (2022)
- Kidnapping: 0.5 (2023)
- Robbery: 158.6 (2023)
- Burglary: 46.0 (2022)
- Theft: 245.7 (2022)
- Fraud: 87.9 (2022)
- Rape: 19.0 (2023)
- Sexual assault: 43.1 (2023)
- annually per 100,000 inhabitants

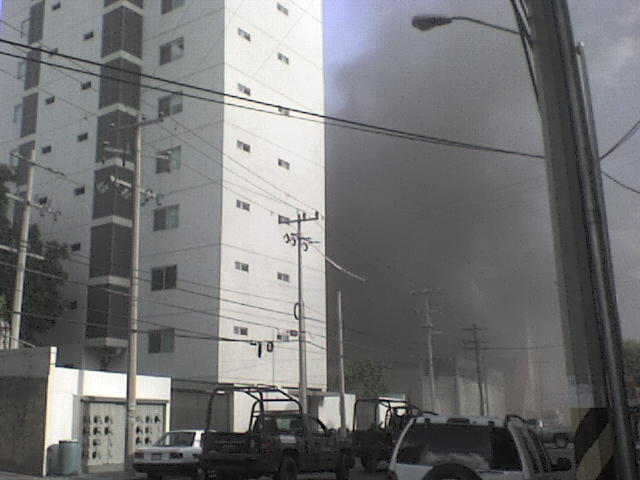
The 2011 arson attack on the Casino Royale perpetrated by Los Zetas killed at least 52 people in Monterrey.

Headquarters of Mexican cartels.

Crime in Mexico is one of the most urgent concerns in the country, as Mexican drug trafficking rings play a major role in the flow of cocaine, methamphetamine, fentanyl, heroin, and marijuana transiting between Latin America and the United States. Drug trafficking has led to corruption, which has had a deleterious effect on Mexico's federal representative republic.

Drug trafficking and organized crime have been a major source of violent crime. Drug cartels and gangs have also branched out to conduct alternative illegal activities for profit, including sex trafficking. Some of the most increasingly violent states in Mexico in 2020 included Guanajuato, Zacatecas, Michoacán, Jalisco, and Querétaro. Mexico has some of the world's most violent cities by homicide rate, and in recent years has ranked as the country with the highest number of cities in the top 50 (17 of the top 50 in 2022.) Extortion and fuel theft from criminal groups (such as CSRL and CJNG) are now becoming commonplace. The state of Zacatecas is said to be valuable to multiple organized crime groups (including the Sinaloa Cartel and CJNG) for drug trafficking, specifically methamphetamine to the United States. As of 2021, Michoacán is experiencing increased instances of extortion and kidnapping due to a growing presence and escalation in the armed conflicts between CJNG and Cárteles Unidos on regions bordering the neighboring state of Jalisco. CJNG is also currently battling the Los Chapitos faction of the Sinaloa Cartel in the North Mexican region of Sonora.

Mexico has experienced increasingly high crime rates, especially in major urban centers. The country's great economic polarization has stimulated criminal activity mainly in the lower socioeconomic strata, which include the majority of the country's population. Crime is increasing at high levels, and is repeatedly marked by violence, especially in the cities of Tijuana and Ciudad Juárez, and the states of Baja California, Durango, Sinaloa, Guerrero, Chihuahua, Michoacán, Tamaulipas, and Nuevo León. Other metropolitan areas have lower, yet still serious, levels of crime. Low apprehension and conviction rates contribute to the high crime rate. Since many crimes go unreported, the rates may be much higher than reported by the government. The murder rate in 2023 was 23.3 per 100,000. Most of the crime is committed by a small proportion of the population involved in the drug trade with about half of murders being drug-related.

Assault and theft make up the vast majority of crimes. While urban areas tend to have higher crime rates, as is typical in most countries, the United States–Mexico border has also been a problematic area. In 2017, Mexico witnessed a record number of murders, with 29,158 homicides recorded.

Mexico is Latin America's most dangerous country for journalists according to the Global Criminality Index 2016. Many of these crimes go unpunished, which has led to campaigns in the press and demonstrations highlighting the supposed 'impunity' of those responsible for murdering investigative journalists.

== Crime by type ==
=== All types ===
Crime rates in Mexico per 100,000 inhabitants
	2000	2001	2002	2003	2004	2005	USA in 2004	2020 FEB
Total crimes	1,433.81	1,439.41	1,391.54	1,521.93	1,503.71	1,425.98	4,118.76	NA
Murder	14.93	15.13	14.11	13.94	13.04	10.91	5.62	27.9
Murder with firearm	3.45	4.54	3.66	3.53	2.58	3.08	3.12	NA
Assault	254.35	257.39	260.39	260.41	251.91	224.17	NA	NA
Aggravated assault	171.06	172.02	185.01	187.33	186.68	162.85	310.14	NA
Rape	11.89	11.9	13.33	13.05	14.26	12.86	32.99	NA
Theft	148.27	108.11	100.22	116.74	112.47	NA	2445.80	NA
Automobile theft	161.15	161.52	162.10	150.66	139.86	136.47	432.12	113.8 (W/Violence) 100.2 (W/O/Violence)
Robbery	316.54	274.63	219.59	158.16	146.57	489.96	145.87	NA
Burglary	145.72	153.58	142.58	NA	NA	20.52	746.22	NA
Fraud	54.63	50.48	50.96	54.64	61.47	53.67	NA	NA
Drug offenses	20.62	23.97	24.65	23.38	23.40	37.31	NA	NA
Source: The 7th and 8th, 10th Surveys, United Nations as well as Mexico Crime Report (2020)

=== Murder ===
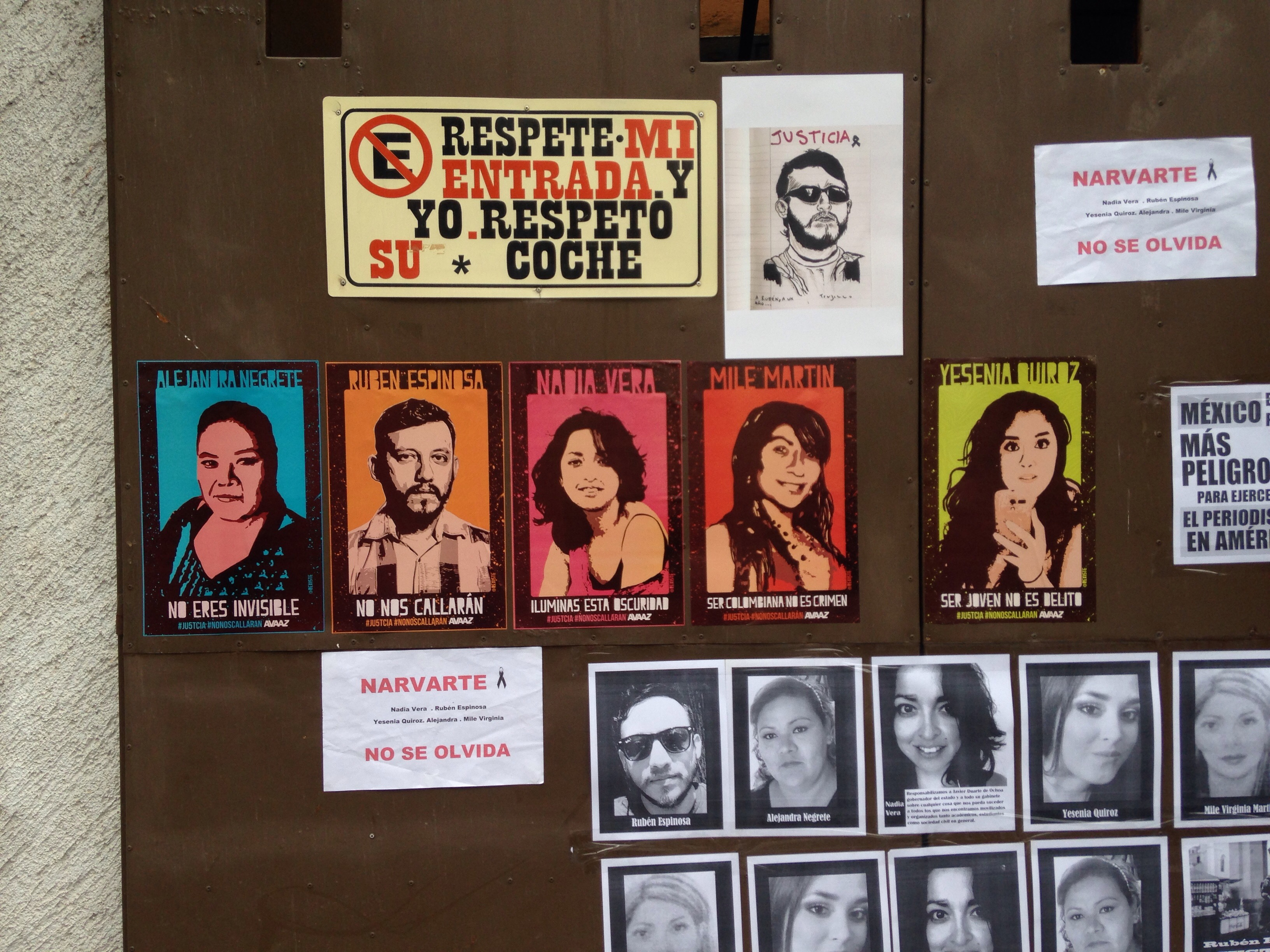
First anniversary protest of the 2015 Colonia Narvarte killings in Mexico City, July 31, 2016

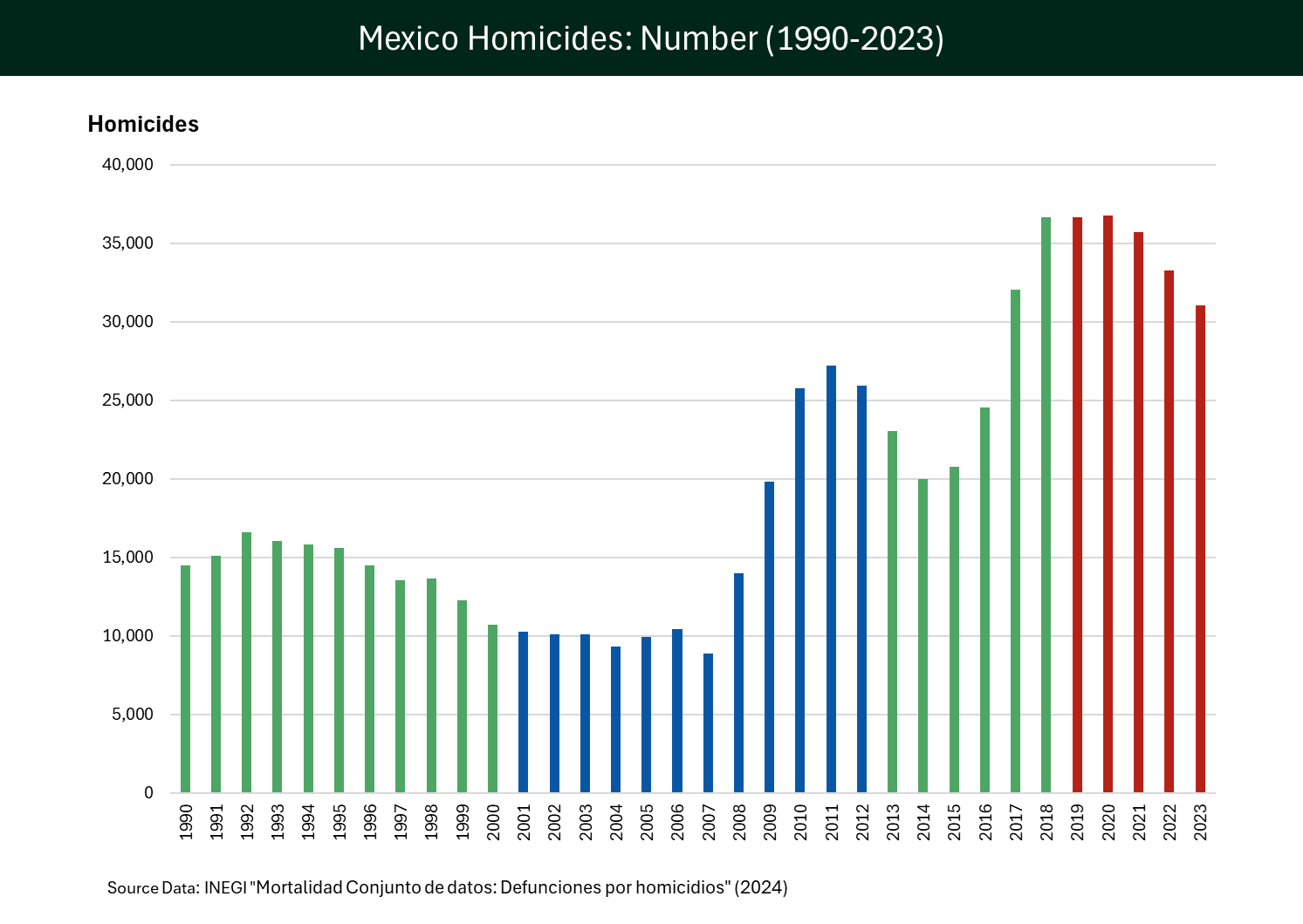
Total homicides in Mexico (1990-2023)

In 2012, Mexico had a murder rate of 21.5 per 100,000 population. There were a total of 26,037 murders in Mexico in 2012. Between 2000 and 2013, 215,000 people in Mexico were murdered. By 2013 there were only 30,800 people incarcerated for murder, showing that many murders go unsolved. In October 2017, Mexico suffered its deadliest month since it started keeping such data in 1997, with 2,371 murder investigations. 2017 was Mexico's deadliest year on record, with 31,174 murders recorded, leading to a murder rate of 25 per 100,000 inhabitants in 2017, compared with 19.4 in 2011. In May 2018, Mexico broke the previous deadliest month on record set in October with 2,530 reported cases of intentional homicides during the month, or 93 per day. In 2018, Mexico broke the previous deadliest year record, with Mexican authorities opened 33,341 murder investigations in 2018, the highest number ever. However in 2019, homicides were on track to reach 35,000 in 2019 which is even higher than the 2018 year record.

=== Drug trafficking ===
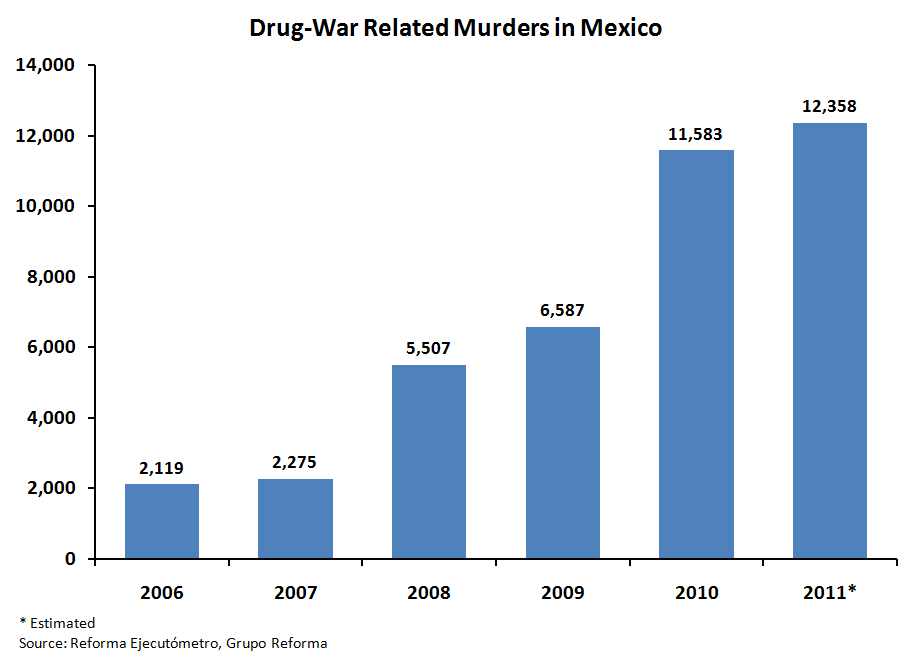
Drug-war related murders in Mexico, 2006–2011

The United States is a lucrative market for illegal drugs. The United Nations estimates that nearly 90% of cocaine sold in the United States originates in South America and is smuggled through Mexico. Mexico is the largest foreign supplier of marijuana and the largest source of heroin for the U.S. market. The majority of methamphetamine sold in the United States is made in Mexico, and Mexican-run methamphetamine labs that operate north of the border account for much of the remainder.

==== Drug cartels ====
Mexican drug cartels play a major role in the flow of cocaine, heroin, and marijuana transiting between Latin America and the United States. These drug cartels often use Mexican-American and other Latino gangs to distribute their narcotics in United States.

Mexican drug cartels also have ties to Colombian drug traffickers, and other international organized crime. A sharp spike in drug-related violence has some analysts worrying about the 'Colombianization' of Mexico.

According to the DEA, about 93% of cocaine in the United States comes from Colombia and is smuggled across the Mexico–United States border.

==== Domestic production of illegal drugs ====
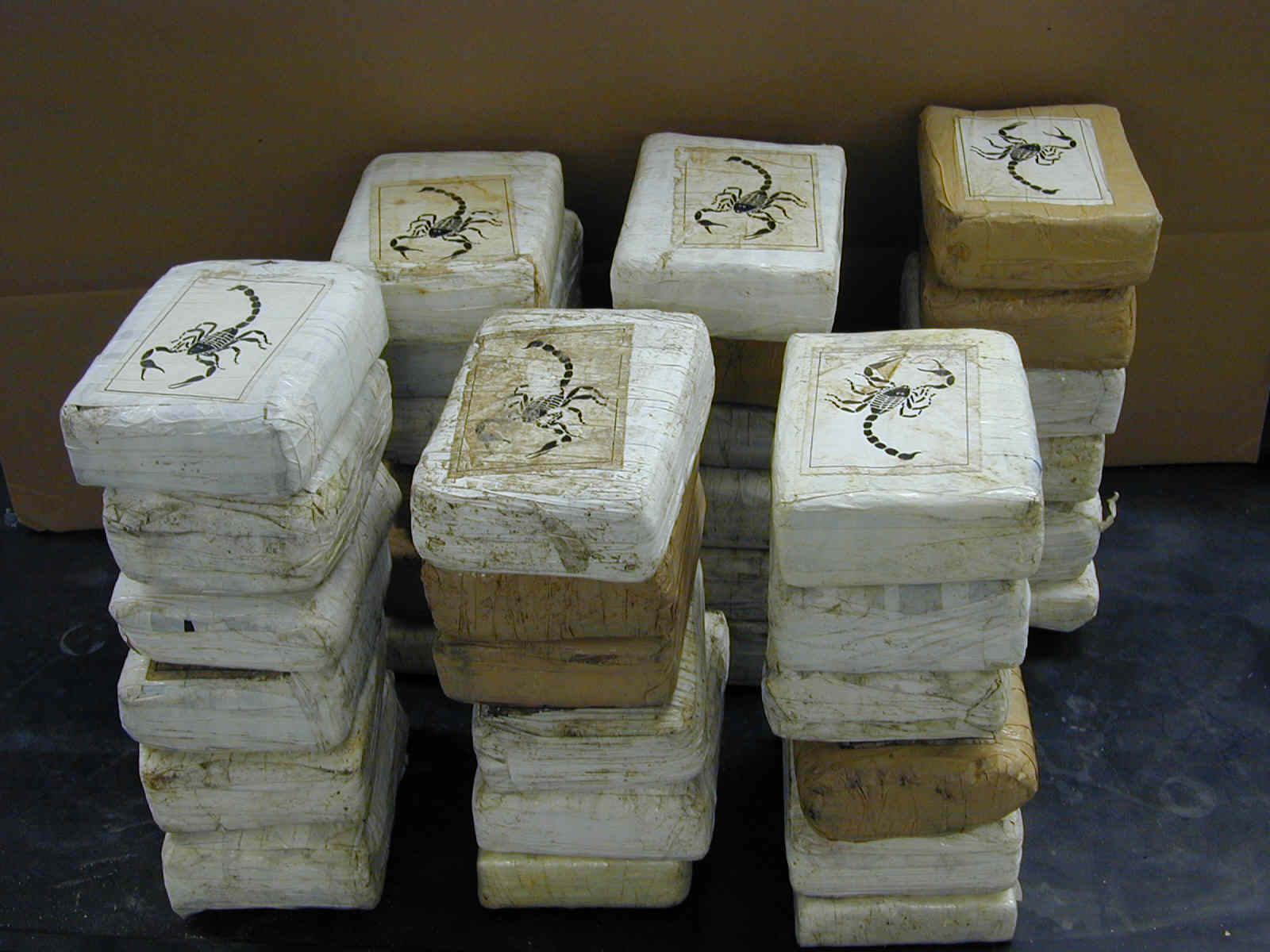
Bricks of cocaine, a form in which it is commonly transported

Some illegal drugs are also produced in Mexico, including significant amounts of opium poppy, and marijuana in the western Sierra Madre Mountains region. In 2017, the INL estimated that "between 90 and 94 percent of all heroin consumed in the United States comes from Mexico." Mexico has increasingly become a major producer of amphetamines and other synthetic drugs in the North American market (e.g. crystal), especially in the states of Guerrero, Michoacán, Jalisco and the Distrito Federal. Since early 2007, the export of manufactured drugs has been controlled by the Beltran-Leyva brothers (Sonora-Sinaloa-DF) and "la Familia de Michoacán". These two crime groups have controlled the corridors from the deep sea port of Lázaro Cárdenas in Michoacán, where precursor products to manufacture synthetic drugs are imported from Asia.

==== Domestic consumption of illegal drugs ====
Marijuana, crack cocaine, methamphetamine, and other drugs are increasingly consumed in Mexico, especially by youths in urban areas and northern parts of the country.

Border towns on the Mexico–United States border have been negatively affected by the Opioid epidemic in the United States. Many of the deaths are from an extremely potent opioid, fentanyl, which is trafficked from Mexico.

=== Corruption ===
High levels of corruption in the police, judiciary, and government in general have contributed greatly to the crime problem. Corruption is a significant obstacle to Mexico's achieving a stable democracy.

Mexico is ranked the 138th least corrupt country in the world which makes them less corrupt than Papua New Guinea but more corrupt than Lebanon. This is according to the Corruption Perceptions Index, which is based on 13 different surveys and includes police, business, and political corruption.

==== Corruption in law enforcement ====
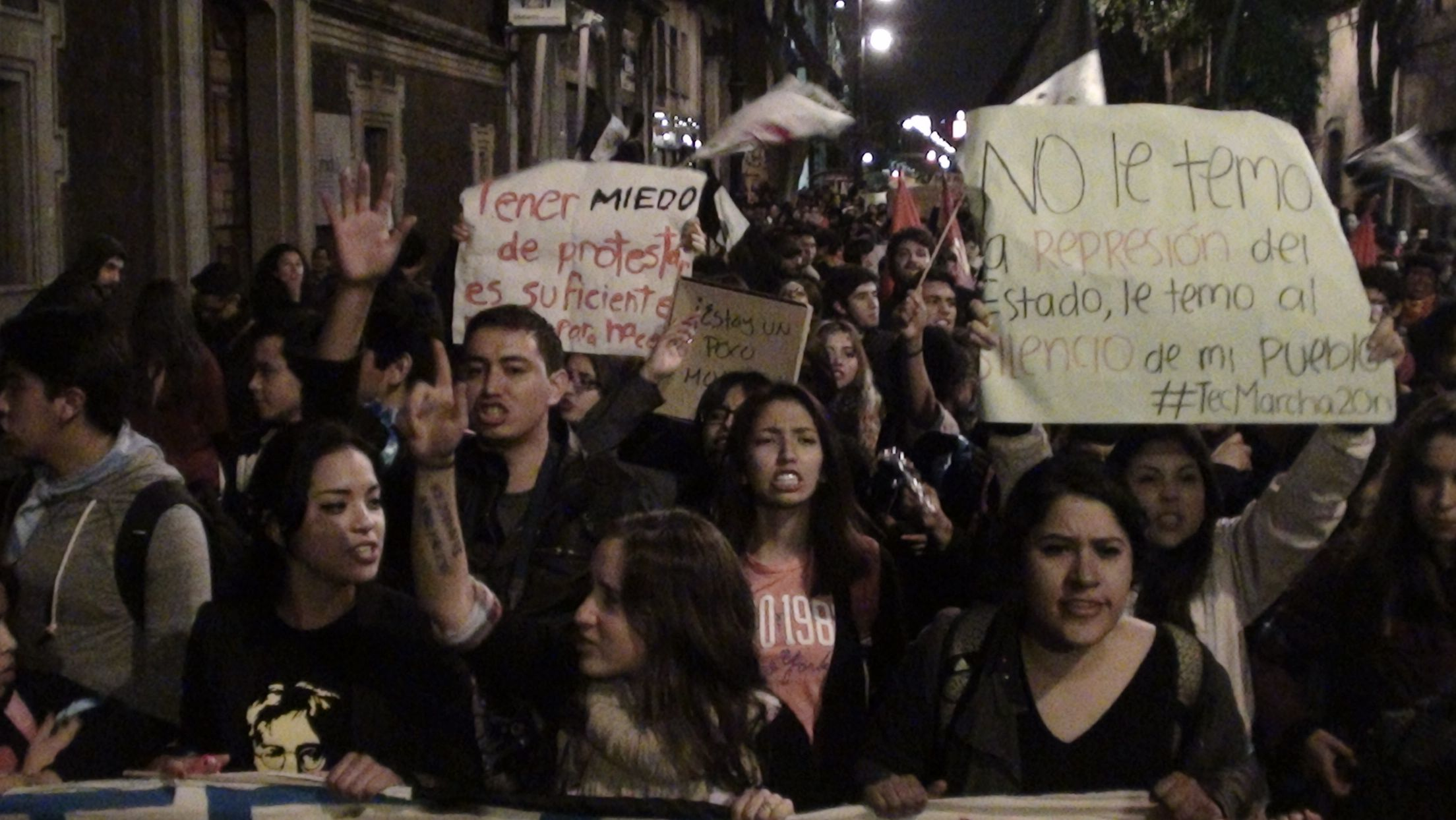
The mass kidnapping of the 43 students in Iguala on September 26, 2014, triggered a nationwide protest

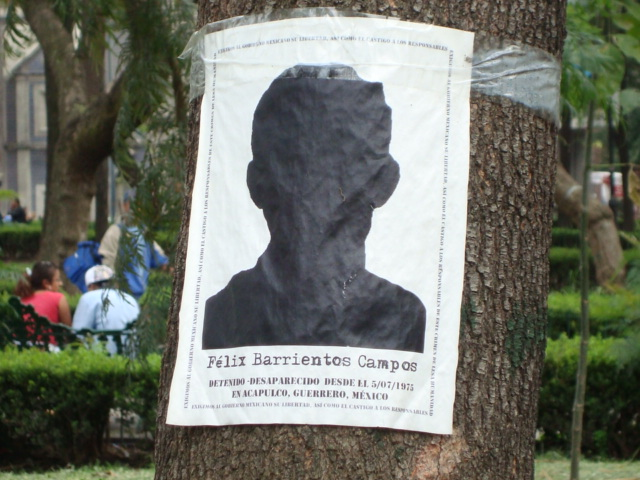
Poster denouncing the forced disappearance of Felix Barrientos Campos, arrested on July 5, 1975, in Acapulco (Guerrero, Mexico) and whose whereabouts are unknown until the date of the poster's placement in 2010. The announcement was placed in the Alameda Central of Mexico City.

The war was characterized by a backlash against the active student movement of the late 1960s which ended in the Tlatelolco massacre at a 1968 student rally in Mexico City.

The organization of police forces in Mexico is complex; each police force has a different level of jurisdiction and authority, and those levels often overlap. The Procuraduría General de la República (Federal Attorney General's office) along with the law enforcement agencies Policia Federal Preventiva and Agencia Federal de Investigación, has responsibility for overseeing law enforcements across the entire country. In addition, there are several police organizations at the state, district, and city level. Since pay is generally poor (U.S.$285–$400 per month), police officers are more likely to accept bribes to protect criminals or ignore crime entirely. Law enforcement personnel are often presented with the option of choosing "Plata o Plomo"; meaning they can either accept a bribe (plata, for silver) or they will be killed (plomo, for lead).

Corruption plagues the various levels of police, and is frequently difficult to track down and prosecute since police officers may be protected by district attorneys and other members of the judiciary. The problem is especially pronounced in northern border areas such as Tijuana, where police are engaged by drug traffickers to protect and enforce their illicit interests.

The Mexican police force often do not investigate crimes, will generally randomly select someone to be the guilty party then fabricate the evidence. This issue is a major problem throughout Mexico as many of the actual police force are the ones involved in the crimes or are trying to cover up their poor police work.

==== Corruption in the judiciary ====
A United Nations Special Rapporteur undertook a mission to Mexico in 2002 to investigate reports by the United Nations Commission on Human Rights that the country's judiciary and administration of law was not independent. During the course of his visit to a number of cities, the rapporteur observed that corruption in the judiciary had not been reduced significantly. One of the principal issues is that, because the federal courts operate at a relatively high level, most citizens are compelled to seek justice in the inadequate state courts.

Additionally, the rapporteur expressed concerns about such issues as disorganization in the legal profession, difficulties and harassment faced by lawyers, poor trial procedures, poor access to the justice system for indigenous peoples and minors, and lacklustre investigation of many crimes.

=== Violent crime against journalists ===
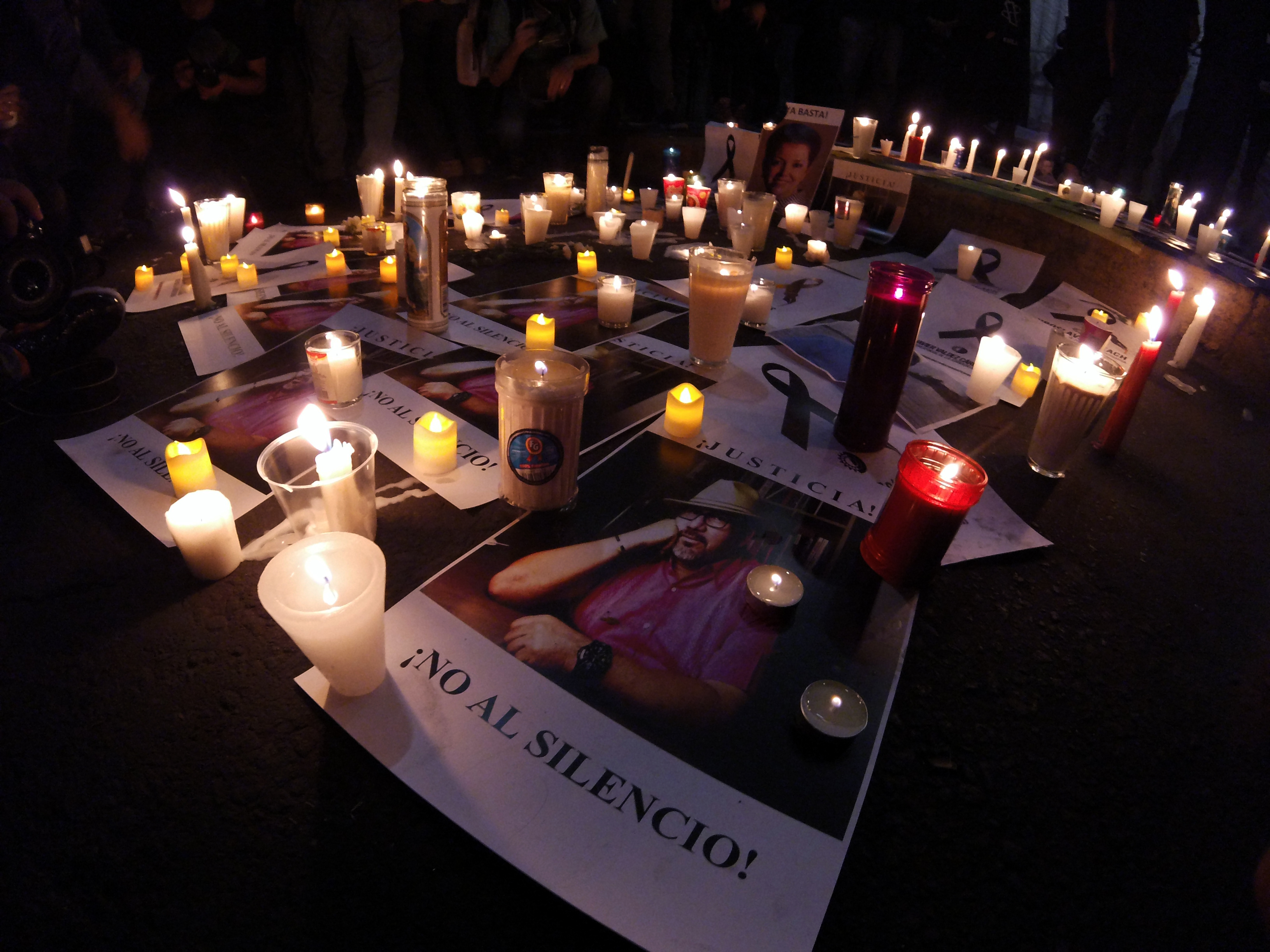
Demonstration against the murder of Javier Valdez Cárdenas in May 2017

A significant increase in violent crime against journalists has been encountered in the country in recent years. Although the problem has existed since at least 1970, the amount of violence against journalist has intensified since the beginning of the Mexican drug war, with at least 90 journalists murdered or disappeared in Mexico since 2006. Few of the perpetrators have been brought to justice. One of the more prominent cases was that of syndicated columnist Francisco Arratia Saldierna, a prominent and well-known journalist who wrote a column called Portavoz (or "Spokesman"). The column featured topics such as corruption, organized crime, and drug trafficking.

Arratia's murder, which was particularly brutal, and others like it, sparked demands from other journalists that then-President Vicente Fox do more to enforce security and bring those responsible for the murders to justice. In 2004, a group of 215 reporters and editors sent an urgent letter to President Fox and other federal authorities, demanding that they address these concerns. The letter represented a massive communication effort coming from professionals from 19 of the nation's 31 states. The key demand was that violent crimes against journalists be made federal crimes, so they would be investigated and prosecuted by federal officers and not by local officials whom the letter claims could be the same people who commit the crimes.

The effect of these crimes has been the self-censorship of many journalists, due to fears of retribution from criminals. The situation has earned attention from prominent global organizations such as the office of the United Nations High Commissioner for Human Rights (OHCHR) and the Center for Journalism and Public Ethics (CEPET). Amerigo Incalcaterra of the OHCHR advocated the protection of journalists and the preservation of freedom of speech, calling it "essential for the consolidation of democracy and the rule of law in this country".

=== Forced disappearance ===
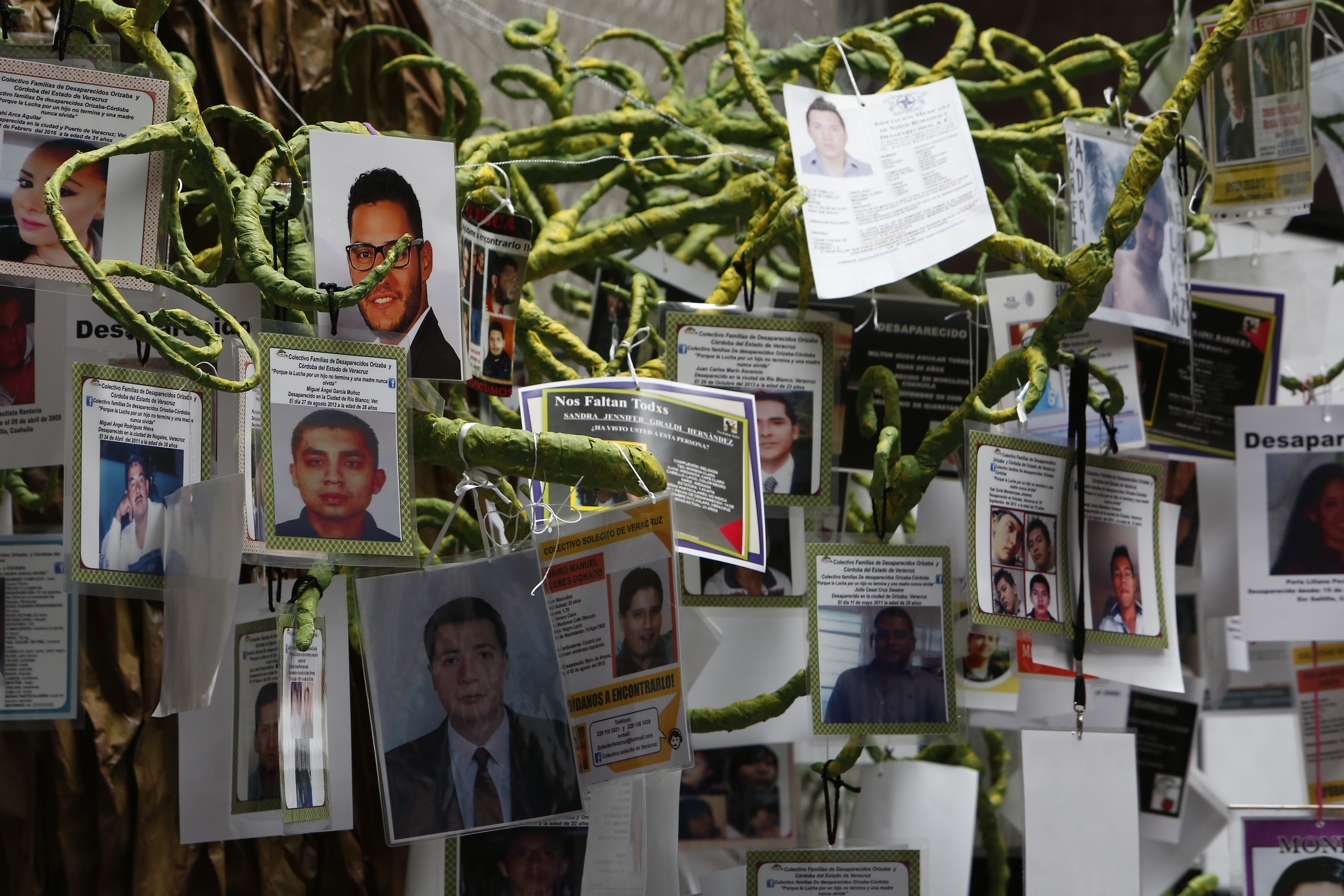
Mexico's disappeared people

Over 30,000 people in Mexico have been reported missing in 2016. Moreover, from 1952-2025, over 130,000 individuals disappeared.

=== Sex trafficking and slavery ===
Mexican citizens and foreigners have been victims of sex trafficking in Mexico. Drug cartels and gangs fighting in the Mexican drug war have relied on trafficking as an alternative source of profit to fund their operations. The cartels and gangs also abduct women and girls to use as their personal sex slaves.

=== Violence against women ===
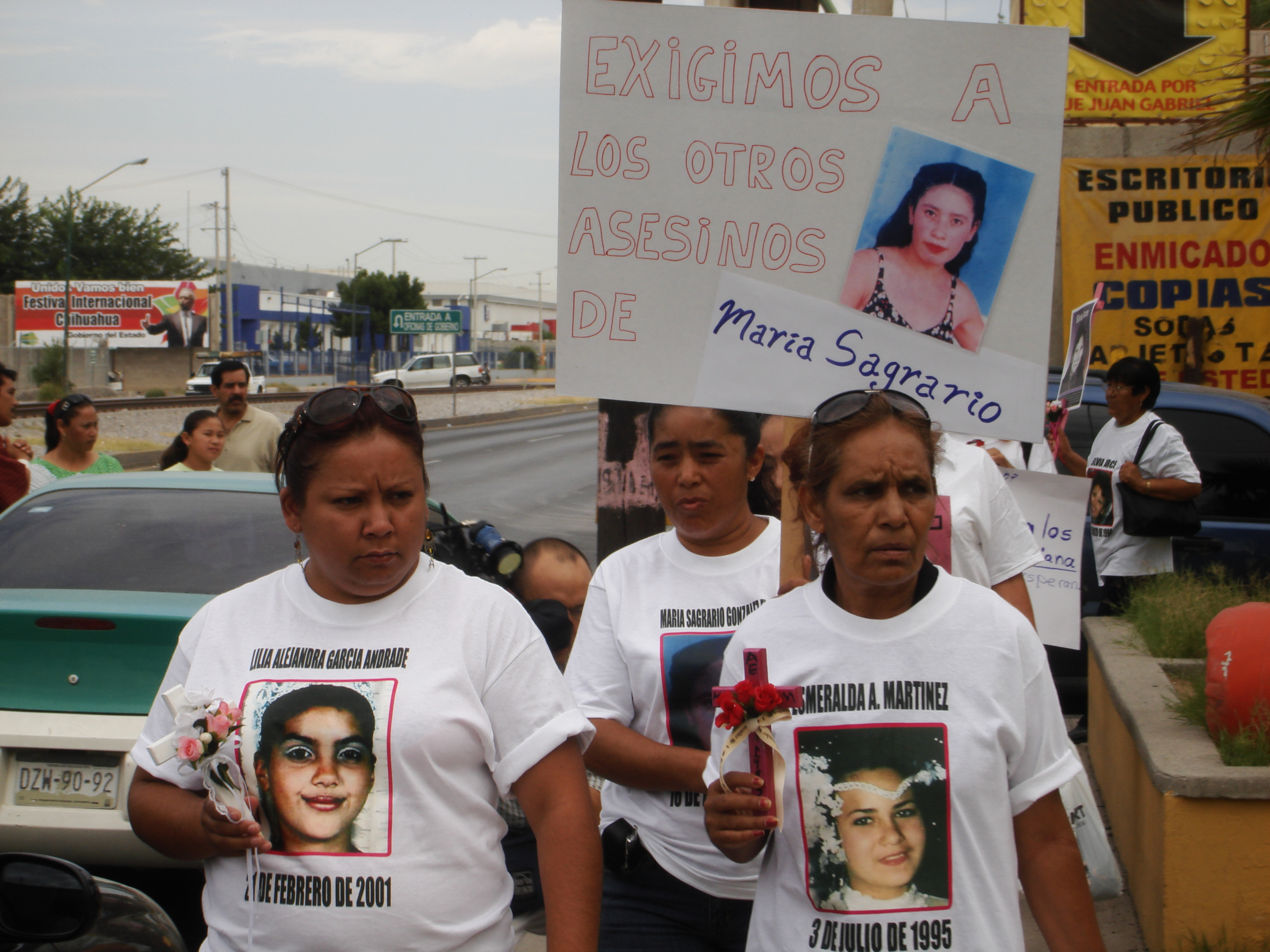
2007 protest by some victims' families demanding punishment of the killers

As of 2014, Mexico has the 16th highest rate of homicides committed against women in the world. This rate has been on the rise since 2007.

According to the 2013 Human Rights Watch, many women do not seek out legal redress after being victims of domestic violence and sexual assault because "the severity of punishments for some sexual offenses contingent on the "chastity" of the victim" and "those who do report them are generally met with suspicion, apathy, and disrespect."

According to a 1997 study by Kaja Finkler, domestic abuse "is embedded in gender and marital relations fostered in Mexican women's dependence on their spouses for subsistence and for self-esteem, sustained by ideologies of romantic love, by family structure and residential arrangements."

Gender violence is more prevalent in regions along the Mexico-US border and in areas of high drug trading activity and drug violence. The phenomenon of the female homicides in Ciudad Juárez involves the violent deaths of hundreds of women and girls since 1993 in the northern Mexican region of Ciudad Juárez, Chihuahua, a border city across the Rio Grande from the U.S. city of El Paso, Texas. As of February 2005, the number of murdered women in Ciudad Juarez since 1993 is estimated to be more than 370.

In 2005, journalist Lydia Cacho published a book, Demons of Eden, exposing Mexican politicians and business leaders' large roles in a child sex trade spanning Mexico. She was abducted and harassed by police officers in response.

Women in the Mexican drug war (2006–present) have been raped, tortured, and murdered in the conflict.

Organized crime has forced many women to flee their homes and live in fear of being found. In a 2025 study of 16 women displaced by organized crime. The study shows that their survival strategies include individual, family, social, and institutional levels. Although the study finds that institutional responses are often limited or ineffective, forcing many women to rely more heavily on personal resilience and informal support systems that is only temporary.

In 2025 Amnesty International reported 2,589 investigations into killings of women and 672 possible feminicides in 2025. The report also shows 3,637 cases of disappeared women, 1,745 of those were under the age of 19. It also shows CEDAW express concern about increasing gender-based violence by both state and non-state actors, including criminal organizations. Amnesty further noted that the poor response from authorities have pushed relatives of disappeared people, mostly women organized in collectives, to carry out dangerous searches on their own called “mujeres buscadoras”.

== By location ==
=== Mexico City ===
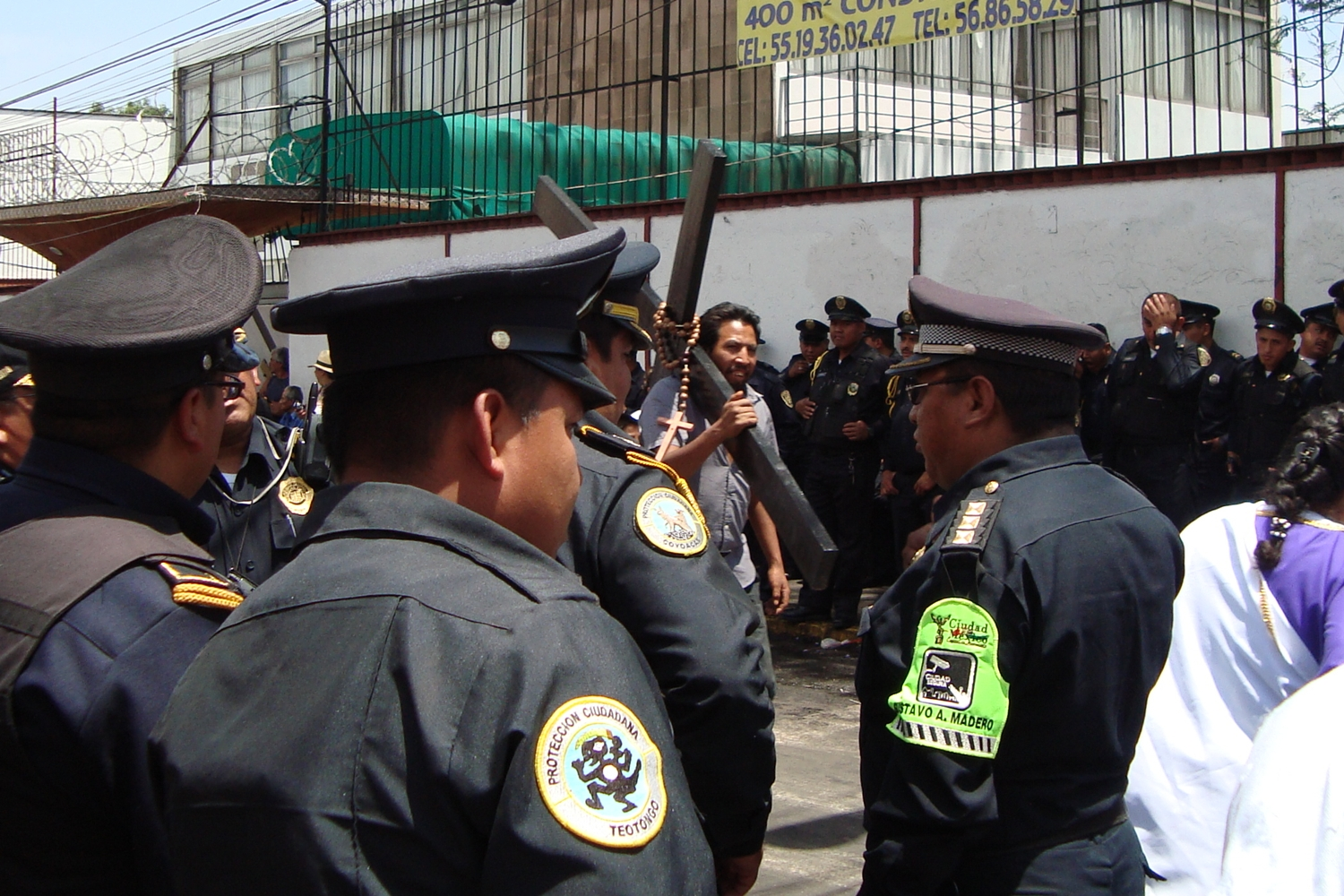
Police on the street in the high crime area of Iztapalapa, Mexico City.

Between 2000 and 2004 an average of 478 crimes were reported each day in Mexico City. The actual crime rate is thought to be much higher "since most people are reluctant to report crime." Under policies enacted by Mayor Marcelo Ebrard between 2009 and 2011, Mexico City underwent a major security upgrade with violent and petty crime rates both falling significantly despite the rise in violent crime in other parts of the country. Some of the policies enacted included the installation of 11,000 security cameras around the city and a very large expansion of the city police force.

Mexico City currently has one of the highest police officer to resident ratios in the world, with one uniformed police officer per every 100 citizens. The murder rate in 2009 was 8.4 per 100,000 — by comparison, higher than the 5.6 in New York City but much less than the 14.8 in Atlanta.

In Mexico City, the area of Iztapalapa has the highest rates of rape, violence against women, and domestic violence in the capital.

=== Homicide by state ===
In 2024, Guanajuato recorded the most homicides in 2024 (2,553), followed by Baja California (2,089) and Chihuahua (1,995). Meanwhile, the highest homicide rates were found in Colima (121.90), Morelos (67.41) and Baja California (55.28).

The state of Chihuahua ranked number one in atrocities in the country, the least was Baja California Sur.

Intentional homicide rate (per 100,000)
Mexico	Sources	2006	2007	2008	2009	2010	2011	2012	2013	2014	2015	2016	2017	2018	2019	2020
Colima		5.12	4.86	5.23	8.06	14.11	24.54	41.87	25.49	13.92	23.08	71.22	96.61	80.90	86.68	71.08
Baja California		16.22	16.80	27.47	23.67	27.41	20.55	17.73	22.92	20.80	23.82	33.38	58.36	76.18	70.61	70.15
Chihuahua		17.85	18.27	59.16	90.56	110.71	86.68	55.49	39.69	29.56	25.47	32.89	41.72	47.22	56.85	60.26
Guanajuato		4.54	4.26	4.73	7.52	7.86	10.76	13.60	11.21	12.29	15.11	16.39	18.55	44.60	47.44	57.40
Zacatecas		3.45	4.52	5.01	5.09	7.29	7.81	12.69	10.77	7.29	14.91	28.96	35.12	35.94	32.79	50.82
Michoacán		15.52	12.28	13.04	16.61	14.95	17.34	16.80	19.91	19.81	16.90	27.81	27.41	29.44	36.37	43.65
Sonora		9.36	11.91	14.93	18.59	23.98	17.06	17.83	20.17	19.64	17.46	19.81	23.01	23.96	34.16	42.70
Morelos		9.33	6.54	7.70	17.81	31.00	30.43	46.57	31.85	21.92	25.78	31.70	30.63	35.37	46.49	40.91
Guerrero		25.17	23.88	28.13	41.90	43.55	62.13	66.01	59.22	42.69	56.50	61.67	64.26	62.45	44.45	34.23
Quintana Roo		10.13	14.45	15.21	13.55	17.32	19.28	17.36	14.41	11.24	14.48	10.19	21.57	42.58	38.22	32.49
Sinaloa		22.12	26.91	41.48	44.35	60.11	50.72	40.99	33.45	28.59	28.65	31.93	43.89	31.53	26.91	22.87
San Luis Potosí		5.24	6.06	8.53	6.10	15.94	15.18	14.80	9.66	8.39	8.75	11.02	16.74	16.46	16.28	22.30
Jalisco		6.07	5.48	6.40	7.77	11.93	16.20	15.49	14.19	11.57	12.85	14.37	16.88	24.24	25.03	21.78
Tabasco		7.73	8.88	6.72	5.25	6.35	7.10	5.37	6.00	7.12	9.77	11.46	15.96	18.99	22.60	20.34
Oaxaca		28.69	25.12	19.27	19.59	17.22	16.43	12.01	13.54	16.06	18.74	21.55	22.63	24.01	24.67	19.49
Nuevo León		4.08	6.31	5.76	5.75	17.53	41.75	29.97	14.55	9.77	8.87	12.49	12.54	13.85	16.50	15.68
Tamaulipas		11.06	8.32	9.51	8.75	21.62	25.32	29.72	16.06	17.93	15.04	16.60	22.22	23.26	18.09	15.56
Veracruz		5.82	6.37	6.30	4.54	7.56	11.42	12.32	10.89	6.10	7.02	15.52	20.10	16.71	16.48	14.83
Puebla		7.42	7.10	7.50	7.14	7.08	10.43	9.63	6.74	5.51	8.06	9.43	14.56	17.24	17.29	13.66
State of Mexico		19.08	7.63	8.38	8.78	7.40	9.54	13.22	11.81	12.00	12.27	11.99	11.75	13.18	14.22	13.65
Mexico City		7.23	7.96	7.95	8.34	9.07	8.72	8.74	8.42	8.44	9.64	10.78	12.31	14.12	16.13	13.07
Nayarit		9.45	10.43	13.89	13.66	33.10	40.28	21.12	12.81	9.16	6.78	3.13	20.10	25.44	12.99	12.34
Hidalgo		3.99	5.73	5.34	5.17	4.98	4.07	3.00	4.38	4.96	4.97	5.18	6.79	6.84	9.67	9.96
Querétaro		3.03	3.26	3.26	4.96	3.19	5.21	5.75	5.71	5.22	6.93	5.85	8.53	8.31	8.41	8.66
Tlaxcala		16.80	N/A	3.65	4.11	4.05	5.89	4.82	5.63	4.84	4.62	5.94	9.29	9.14	11.13	8.24
Durango		12.93	15.57	26.41	56.36	61.32	45.20	36.15	27.54	18.03	13.49	13.35	12.50	10.07	8.39	7.97
Campeche		3.58	4.53	5.56	4.98	7.05	6.92	7.96	7.61	7.27	5.84	9.12	7.17	7.11	7.52	7.90
Chiapas		7.76	7.64	6.85	10.32	10.46	12.31	11.35	9.83	7.89	9.56	8.80	8.83	10.09	9.42	7.54
Baja California Sur		3.54	4.79	4.63	4.94	7.39	5.65	5.03	7.80	9.45	19.77	24.40	69.15	18.52	9.26	7.13
Coahuila		4.15	4.54	6.62	8.75	14.63	23.42	27.01	22.32	13.33	9.93	7.54	7.62	7.34	7.16	6.23
Aguascalientes		2.33	4.32	5.46	5.61	6.19	6.09	3.57	3.19	3.31	2.95	2.84	6.13	5.63	6.82	5.46
Yucatán		1.17	1.58	2.44	1.69	1.82	2.29	1.87	1.94	2.01	2.50	2.33	2.12	2.14	1.47	2.25
< 1 1–5 5–10 10–21.1 > 21.1

== Crime reporting and sentencing rate ==
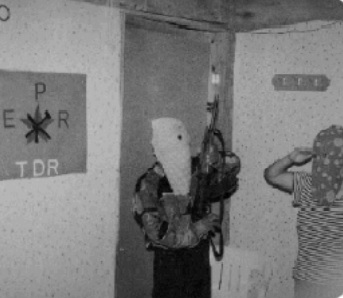
TDR-EP guerrillas during a revolutionary meeting. See Terrorism in Mexico

According to the CNDH, only one out of every ten crimes is reported in Mexico; this is due to lack of trust from citizens to the authorities. Furthermore, only one out of 100 reported crimes actually goes to sentencing.

== Effects on tourism ==
Mexico is a major tourist destination, with 42 million people traveling there in 2018; US citizens alone usually make up 15–16 million annually. Because cartel-related violence in Mexico is highly geographically limited, the US State department has issued "do not travel" advisories for only five states as of November 2021: Colima, Guerrero, Michoacán, Sinaloa and Tamaulipas. Even in areas with high levels of violent crime, tourists are rarely targeted as conflicts are usually between rival gangs and/or the police. Pickpocketing and other forms of petty theft are generally the main concerns for travelers to Mexico. Before the COVID-19 pandemic in 2020, tourist numbers were increasing.

In 2015, Verdugo-Yepes, Pedroni and Hu applied a panel structural vector autoregression model to model the effects of crime on GDP growth and foreign direct investment (FDI) at the state and national level.

Chela Rivas, a Mexican singer and performer, stated in 2020 that "because of the war with drug cartels, each day it becomes more and more dangerous to ... travel to remote towns and sing. It is not only frustrating, it is scary."

The Teotihuacan shooting in 2026, weeks before the World Cup, led the Mexican government to create stricter security protocols on tourist sites around Mexico. The shooting resulted in the death of 1 Canadian woman and 13 others injured, ending with the perpetrator shooting himself, according to authorities. The attack led to temporary closure of the site, bag checks and included National Guard deployment. When the site reopened following the aftermath, there was heightened security presence and fewer tourists than usual.

== Efforts to combat crime ==
=== Law enforcement initiatives ===
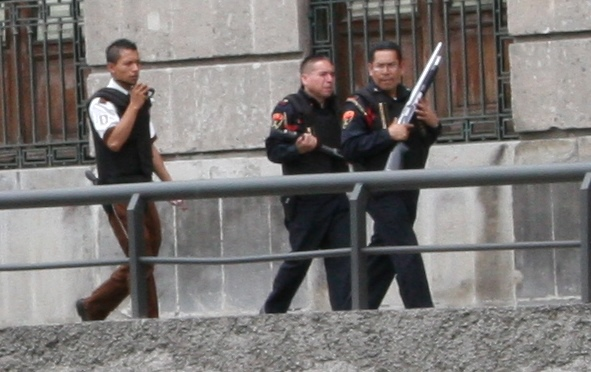
Armed police at the Zócalo, Mexico City

Mexican law enforcement is divided between federal, state, and municipal entities. Estimates range between 1,600 and 3,000 different police forces in total. There are over 350,000 police agents in Mexico.

At all levels, policing in Mexico tends to maintain separate forces for patrol/response (preventive) policing on the one hand and investigative (judicial) policing on the other.

==== Federal forces at the border ====
In June 2005, the government deployed federal forces to three states to contain surging violence linked to organized crime. At a news conference in Mexico City, presidential spokesman Rubén Aguilar told reporters that the new deployment was the result of evidence that organized crime has penetrated some local police departments.

==== Technology in Tijuana ====
In response to a rise in violent crime in the region of Tijuana, considered one of the five most violent areas of the country by the U.S. State Department, mayor Jorge Hank Rhon deployed a massive technology update to the city's police force in February 2006. The technology includes surveillance equipment, handheld computers, and alarm systems. Since tourism is a staple of the economy in Tijuana, the mayor has tried to make reforms to highlight the safety of tourist areas. Tijuana has installed a sophisticated public-security system, but city officials don't seem to know details about how it is funded or the background of the company that supplied it.

=== Political initiatives ===
President Vicente Fox took power in December 2000 promising to crack down on crime and improve a judicial system rife with corruption and ineptitude. Upon taking office, he established a new ministry of Security and Police, doubled the pay for police officers, and committed to other ethics reforms. President Fox also cited drug trafficking and drug consumption as the top cross-border priority issue.

During the first three years of Fox's government, the official number of reported kidnappings showed a slight decrease, from 505 in 2001 to 438 in 2003. The new Federal Investigation Agency (Procuraduria de Justicia) reported dismantling 48 kidnapping rings and saving 419 victims.

==== Cooperation with the United States ====
In 1996, Mexico changed its policy to allow extradition of its citizens to the United States to face trial. Previously, the Constitution had forbidden its citizens to be extradited.

In 2005, the U.S. State Department defended efforts by the two countries to reduce violence and drug trafficking on the border following decisions by governors in the U.S. states of Arizona and New Mexico to declare an emergency in their border counties. The two governors stated, "the federal government's inability to control crime and violence related to illegal immigration had forced them to take matters into their own hands". The Mexican government criticized the emergency declarations.

The U.S. state of Texas and Mexican police officials held a conference in San Antonio to discuss ways of coordinating efforts to stop crime but there are questions about how successful the program will be.

Many Mexican police officials in border towns have been targets of assassination by drug cartels, who have even threatened local law enforcement in the United States. In January 2003, the security consulting company of former New York City Mayor Rudolph Giuliani was hired by business leaders to come up with a plan to clean up Mexico City, which has the second-highest crime rate in Latin America.

In 2026, Mexican army had a security operation in Tapalpa, Jalisco, Mexico. Which lead to the death of Nemesio “El Mencho” Oseguera Cervantes, leader of the CJNG. Prior to the operation, the United States State Department has given respective aliases to CJNG as a Foreign Terrorist Organization. After succession, The New York Times confirms The United States provided intelligence to aid the Mexican Government in its operation.

=== Social initiatives ===
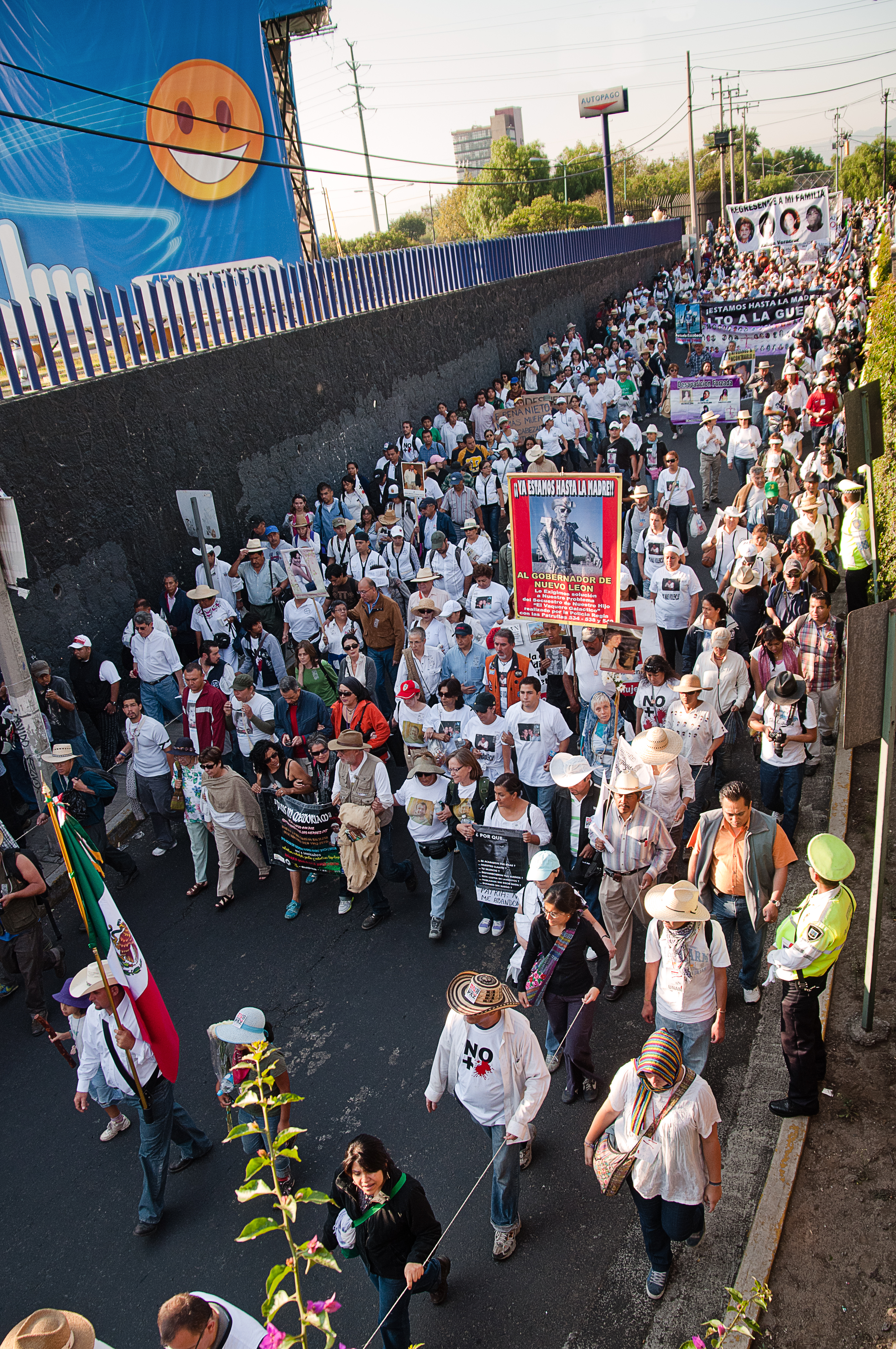
2011 Mexican protests against cartel violence and government disregard

==== Protest march against crime ====
In June 2004, at least a million people marched through the Mexican capital and other cities to protest the failure of federal and local governments to control crime in one of the world's most crime-ridden countries.

=== Human rights violations ===
In its effort to combat crime, the Mexican army was accused of crimes against humanity by several NGOs. In September 2014, several Mexican human rights groups and International Federation for Human Rights, had filed a complaint with the office of the prosecutor of the International Criminal Court, asking it to investigate the “systematic and widespread” abuse of thousands of civilians by the army and the police in their fight against organized crime.

== See also ==
- Gun politics in Mexico
- International child abduction in Mexico
- Crime and violence in Latin America
- Presumed Guilty, a 2009 Mexican documentary film

Mexican drug war:

- List of Mexico's 37 most-wanted drug lords
- Miguel Ángel Félix Gallardo
- Guadalajara Cartel
- Jalisco New Generation Cartel
- Gulf Cartel
- Juárez Cartel
- Los Zetas
- Tijuana Cartel
- El Narco: Inside Mexico's Criminal Insurgency
- Jefe de plaza
