= Law enforcement in Mexico =

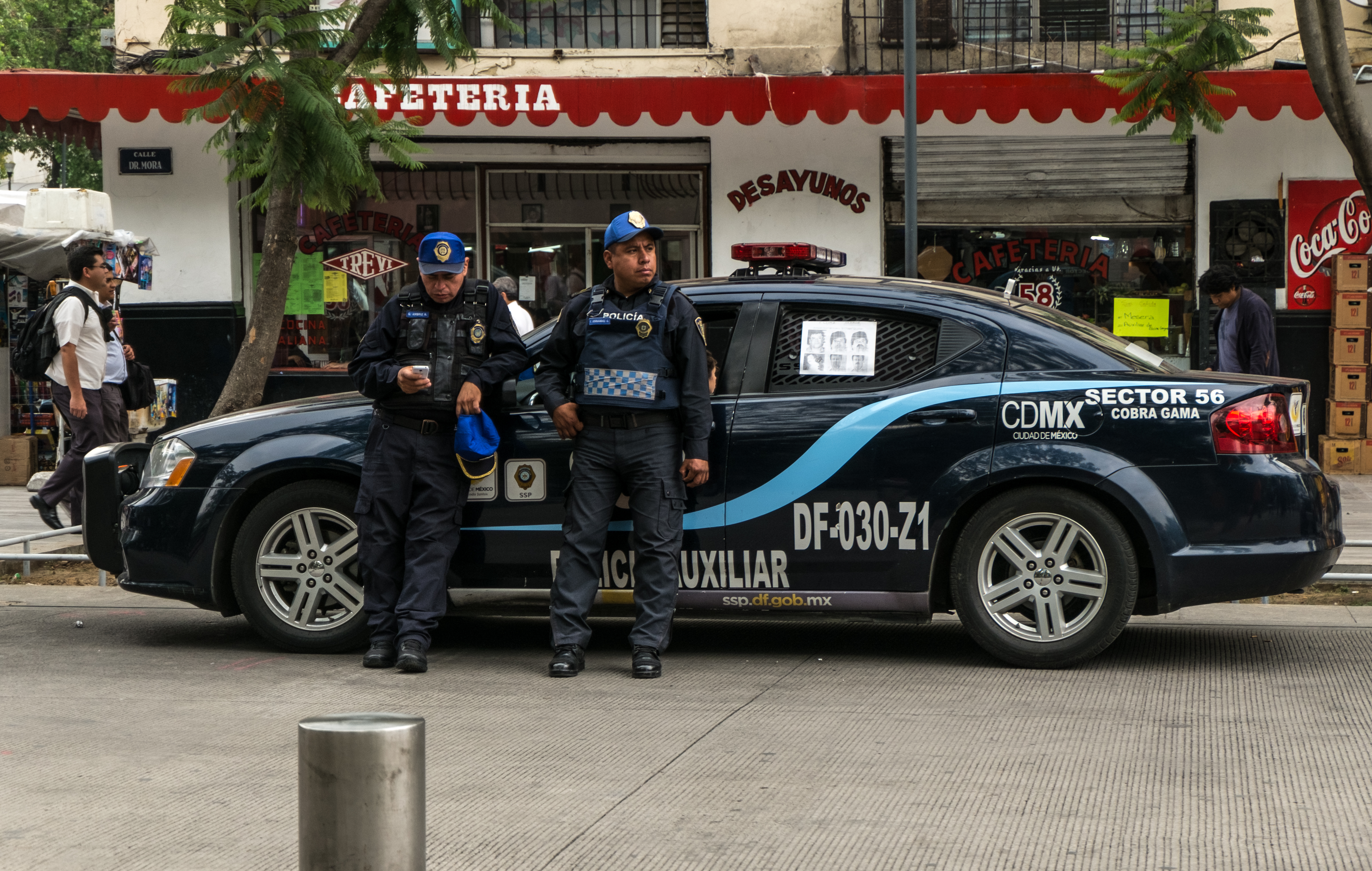
Police officers in Mexico City

Mexico's law enforcement operates with three distinct powers of authority and jurisdiction: federal, state and municipal. The Federal Police, which oversaw nationwide police operations, was dissolved in 2019 by president Andrés Manuel López Obrador due to corruption, links with organized crimes and similar issues. The Mexican National Guard replaced the Federal Police.

== Overview ==
There are two federal police forces, 31 state police forces including two for Mexico City, and (per an investigation of the Executive Secretariat of the National Public Safety System) 1,807 municipal police forces. There are 366 officers per 100,000 people (over 50% more per capita than in the United States), with approximately 500,000 in the entire country.

Moreover, regarding federal law enforcement and defense, Mexico's government owns the Secretariat of Security and Civilian Protection (Secretaría de Seguridad y Protección Ciudadana - SSPC), the Secretariat of National Defense, and the Secretariat of the Navy (Secretaría de Marina - SEMAR). The Mexican Army, Air Force, and its branch of the National Guard are managed by the Secretariat of National Defense (SEDENA).

Furthermore, the National Public Security System formulates, executes, monitors and evaluates policies, programs and strategies regarding public safety. The Secretariat proposes, executes, and evaluates the National Justice Procurement Program, the National Public Security Program and other programmatic instruments on the subject for Mexico.

Additionally, the Federal Protection Service (Servicio de Protección Federal - SPF), National Intelligence Centre (Centro Nacional de Inteligencia - CNI), and other law enforcement agencies are overseen by the Ministry of Security and Civilian Protection. Furthermore, the ministry collaborates with the Attorney General Office of the Republic (Fiscalía General de la República - FGR) to solve cases and impose justice.

=== State and municipal law enforcement ===
State and municipal law enforcement is divided into groups/teams/units in the Governor or Mayor's Ministry of Public Safety (Secretaría de Seguridad Publica—SSP). State and municipal law enforcement possess transit, special operations, proximity, and investigation—so it is called in Mexico. This information is generalized and can vary depending on each agency structure.

=== Prosecution and justice ===
Investigations in Mexico play a vital role in addressing crime and maintaining order. The federal government operates the Criminal Investigations Agency (Agencia de Investigaciones Criminales - AIC), which functions under the Prosecutor General’s Office (Fiscalía General de la República - FGR). These law enforcement investigators, commonly referred to as “ministerial officers” (ministeriales), handle criminal and cartel-related investigations.

In addition to the AIC, other specialized agencies within the Prosecutor General’s Office focus on specific areas. For example, the Prosecutor’s Office Specialized in Organized Crime Matters (Fiscalía Especializada en Materia de Delincuencia Organizada - FEMDO) targets high-profile organized crime cases. Despite the presence of these dedicated branches, investigations in Mexico often face challenges such as lengthy processes and, in some cases, a backlog of unresolved cases. This issue is not universal but has been highlighted in studies as a concern that affects public confidence in the justice system. Strengthening and streamlining investigative processes remain critical for improving law enforcement effectiveness in Mexico.

=== Other law enforcement entities ===
While Mexico's approach on public safety depends on the military or "military police" at a federal level, the government operates with the National Institute of Migration (Instituto Nacional de Migración - INM) which is managed by the Ministry of Interior (Secretaría de Gobernación - SEGOB), tasked with preventing illegal immigration flowing to the United States and managing immigration policies within Mexico. The INM monitors and regulates the entry, stay, and exit of foreign nationals to ensure compliance with Mexican immigration laws.

In collaboration with other federal agencies, the INM conducts border inspections, oversees temporary migration programs, and addresses human trafficking and smuggling networks. Additionally, it operates migrant detention centers and coordinates with international organizations to provide humanitarian aid to vulnerable migrants.

Additionally, the Ministry of Finance and Public Credit (Secretaría de Hacienda y Credito Publico) through the Tax Administration Service (Servicio de Administración Tribunaria - SAT), works together with the National Guard and other security forces to combat tax crimes, such as smuggling or tax evasion.

== Militarization for public security ==
In recent decades, Mexico has increasingly relied on its military to combat organized crime and drug cartels. The 2006 declaration of a "war on drugs" marked a turning point, with thousands of soldiers deployed to regions plagued by cartel activity. The Mexican Army and Navy frequently collaborate with the National Guard for joint patrols. This does not necessarily imply the immediate presence of cartel activity or terrorism in the area. Rather, it is a proactive strategy aimed at combating organized crime and addressing the threats posed by cartels in Mexico. These efforts are focused on maintaining security, preventing escalation, and demonstrating the government’s commitment to protecting its citizens.

Nevertheless, concerns have been raised among both Americans and Mexicans regarding Mexico's federal government’s new strategy of militarization. This includes the deployment of marines and the army to carry out police operations, a move that has sparked debates about its effectiveness and potential consequences. Critics argue that relying on the military for law enforcement could blur the lines between civil and military duties, potentially leading to human rights violations or an erosion of trust in local authorities. On the other hand, supporters view it as a necessary response to the escalating challenges posed by organized crime and violence, emphasizing the need for immediate and decisive action.

== See also ==
- Law enforcement by country
- International Criminal Police Organization (Interpol)
- List of countries and dependencies by number of police officers
- Law of Mexico
- Crime in Mexico
- Terrorism in Mexico
