= Anthurium sarukhanianum =

Scientific classification
- Kingdom: Plantae
- Clade: Tracheophytes
- Clade: Angiosperms
- Clade: Monocots
- Order: Alismatales
- Family: Araceae
- Genus: Anthurium
- Species: A. sarukhanianum

Binomial name
- Anthurium sarukhanianum Croat & Haager
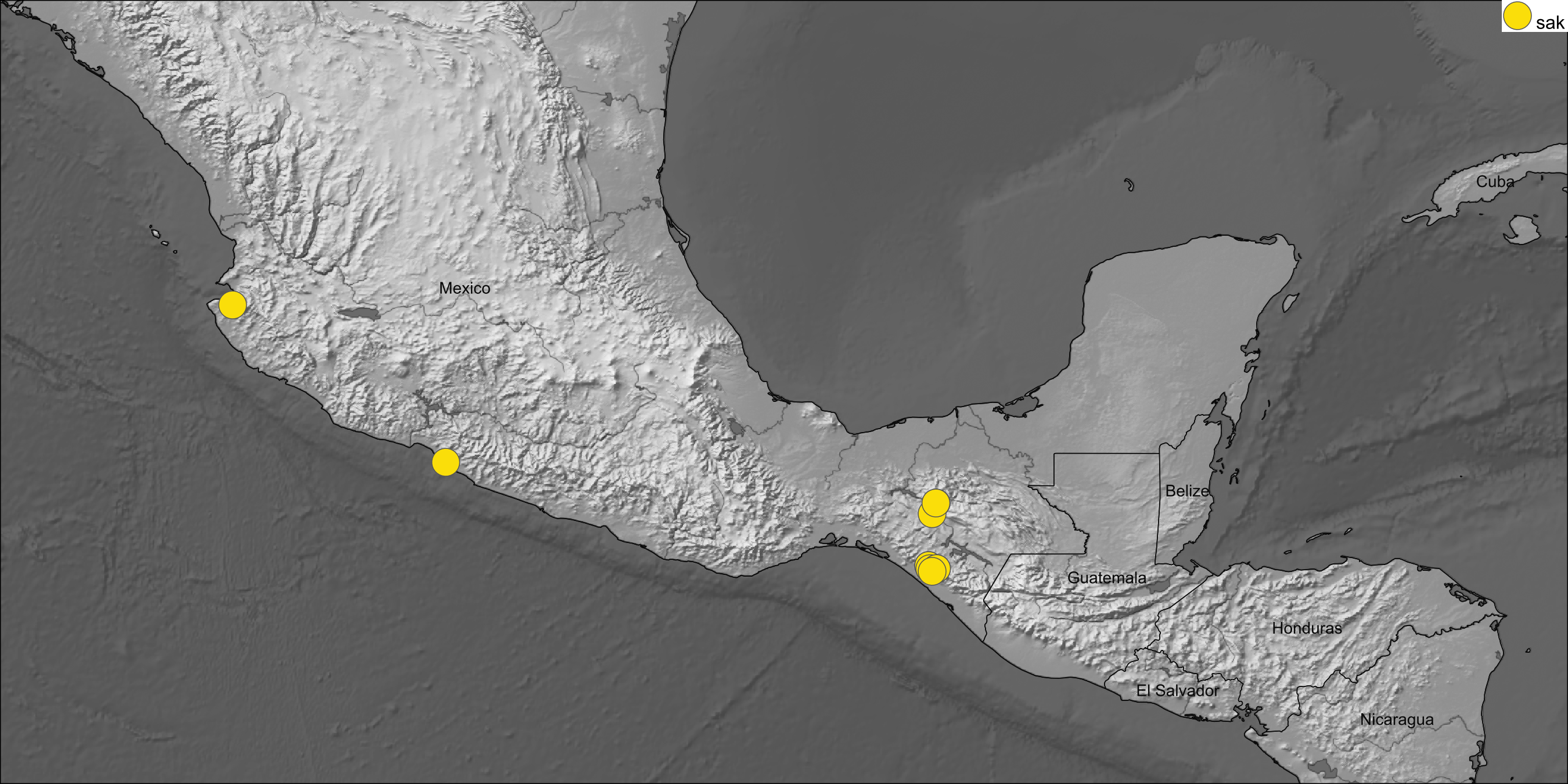
- Map showing the known distribution of Anthurium sarukhanianum

Species of flowering plant

Anthurium sarukhanianum is a herbaceous plant in the family Araceae, endemic to Mexico, in the states of Guerrero, Chiapas and Jalisco. It is named after the Mexican plant biologist José Sarukhán.

== Description ==
Anthurium sarukhanianum is epiphytic species, growing up to 1 meter tall with a short, thick stem and dense, whitish roots that turn green when wet. It has triangular cataphylls that become brown fibers. The leaves are erect and spreading, with moderately leathery, glossy, undulating blades that are long and narrow. The inflorescences are erect and shorter than the leaves, with a slender peduncle and a green spathe mottled with purple. The spadix is medium green and club-shaped, bearing small, glossy flowers with shield-shaped tepals and green pistils.

== Discovery ==
Anthurium sarukhanianum was first collected by the late Jiří Haager, founder and former Director of the Prague Botanical Garden.
