= Francisco Barnés =

Francisco Barnés may refer to:

- Francisco Barnés de Castro (born 1946), Mexican academic and consultant
- Francisco Barnés Salinas (1877–1947), Spanish professor, Republican Left politician and Minister of Education
