= Squatting in Mexico =

Mexico on globe

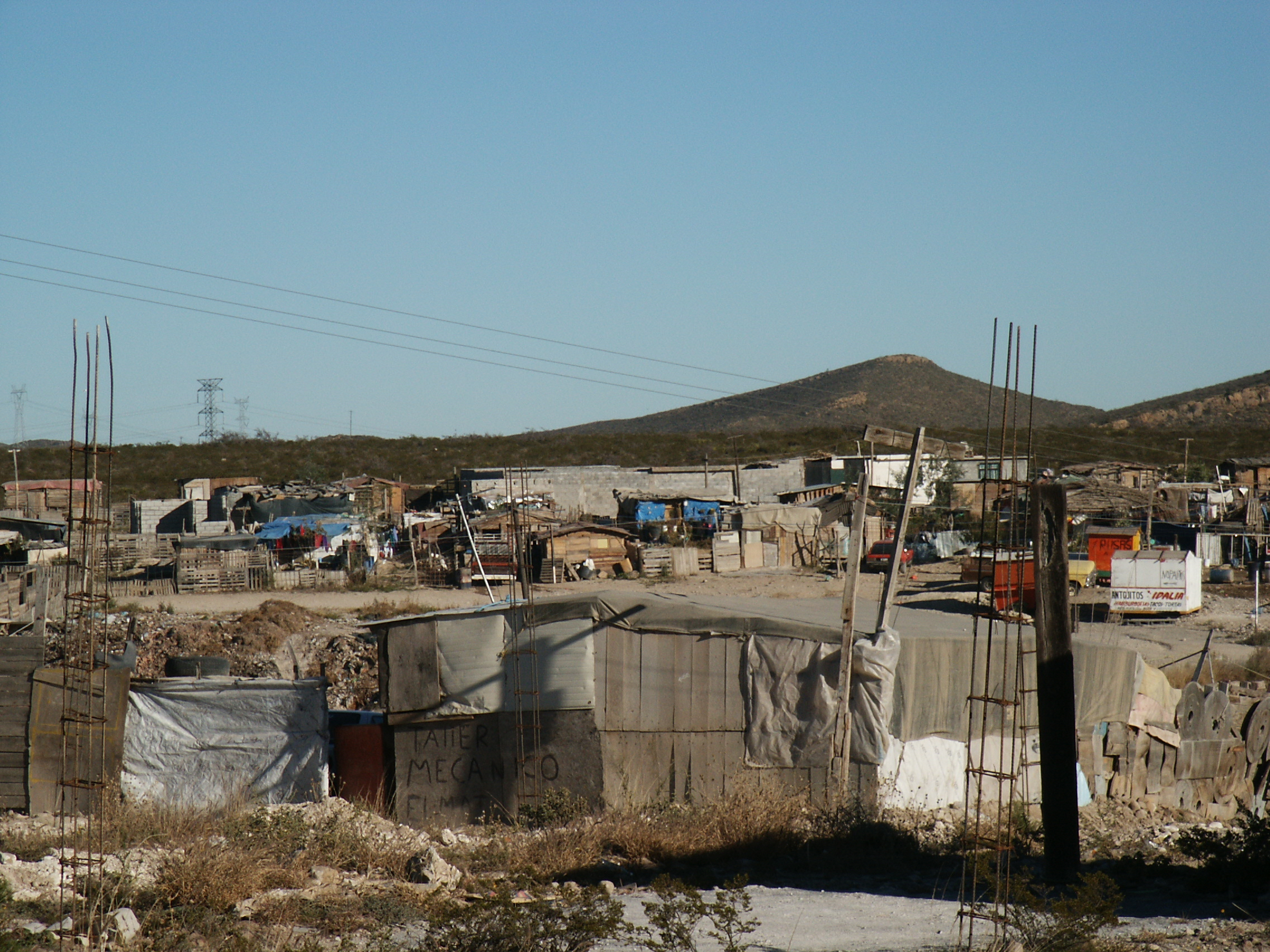
Shacks in Ramos Arizpe

Squatting in Mexico has occurred on the periphery of Mexico City from the 19th century onwards. As of 2017, an estimated 25 per cent of Mexico's urban population lived in informal settlements. In Mexico City, there are self-managed social centres. The CORETT (Commission for the Regularization of Land Holdings) program aims to help squatters to register their land plots.

== History ==
Indigenous migrants have squatted on the periphery of cities such as Mexico City from the 19th century onwards. The 1917 Constitution of Mexico gave indigenous people the right to property, yet squatting continues as a tactic to access land for many poor Mexicans. In order to highlight the housing need in the 1940s, an air force squadron parachuted onto land and established the Escuadrón 201 district. Squatters then became known as "paracaidistas" (parachutists). In the 1970s, squatted informal settlements were known as "colonias paracaidistas".

As of 2017, an estimated 25 per cent of Mexico's urban population lived in informal settlements, in areas such as hillsides or the beds of lakes. Squatting occurs in cities such as Puebla, Playa del Carmen and Tijuana.

In Mexico City, there are self-managed social centres such as Biblioteca Social Reconstruir, Chanti Ollin, Escuela de Cultura Popular Mártires del 68 and Okupa Che. Chanti Ollin and Okupa Che were squatted. There are also art squats such as Casa Matus in Colonia Roma.

== Legal ==
The CORETT (Commission for the Regularization of Land Holdings) program aims to help squatters to register their land plots and has given titles to 2.5 million homes since its formation in 1993. CORETT runs the Programa de Apoyo de los Avecindados en Condiciones de Pobreza Patrimonial para Regularizar Asentimientos Humanos Irregulares (PASPRAH, Program to Support Regularization for Residents in Informal Settlements Who Lack Title and Live in Conditions of Material Poverty) which offers financial support of up to 10,000 pesos to help families register their land.
