= Terrorism in Mexico =

Terrorist incidents in Mexico
| Year | Number of incidents | Deaths | Injuries |
|---|---|---|---|
| 2016 | 5 | 4 | 0 |
| 2015 | 19 | 9 | 10 |
| 2014 | 5 | 1 | 2 |
| 2013 | 8 | 47 | 110 |
| 2012 | 16 | 17 | 8 |
| 2011 | 2 | 0 | 1 |
| 2010 | 5 | 0 | 0 |
| 2009 | 1 | 2 | 3 |
| 2008 | 8 | 21 | 104 |
| 2007 | 10 | 25 | 6 |
| 2006 | 7 | 7 | 34 |
| 2005 | 1 | 2 | 0 |
| 2004 | 1 | 0 | 3 |
| 2003 | 1 | 2 | 1 |
| 2002 | 0 | 0 | 0 |
| 2001 | 7 | 13 | 5 |
| 2000 | 4 | 5 | 3 |
| 1999 | 1 | 0 | 2 |
| 1998 | 2 | 3 | 5 |
| 1997 | 95 | 229 | 47 |
| 1996 | 75 | 96 | 211 |
| 1995 | 29 | 61 | 27 |
| 1994 | 42 | 88 | 32 |
| 1993 | 0 | 0 | 0 |
| 1992 | 6 | 6 | 2 |
| 1991 | 10 | 13 | 0 |
| 1990 | 5 | 3 | 1 |
| 1989 | 1 | 0 | 0 |
| 1988 | 3 | 2 | 0 |
| 1987 | 1 | 0 | 0 |
| 1982 | 2 | 0 | 0 |
| 1985 | 1 | 0 | 0 |
| 1984 | 4 | 13 | 9 |
| 1983 | 2 | 0 | 2 |
| 1982 | 3 | 1 | 0 |
| 1981 | 3 | 0 | 6 |
| 1980 | 5 | 3 | 0 |
| 1979 | 10 | 5 | 0 |
| 1978 | 30 | 7 | 18 |
| 1977 | 19 | 11 | 15 |
| 1976 | 20 | 26 | 5 |
| 1975 | 10 | 32 | 5 |
| 1974 | 16 | 2 | 0 |
| 1973 | 6 | 1 | 0 |
| 1972 | 1 | 0 | 0 |
| 1971 | 0 | 0 | 0 |
| 1970 | 2 | 0 | 0 |

Terrorism in Mexico is the phenomenon of organized violence against civilians. It appeared in the 1960s, committed by communist guerrillas.

== Far-left groups ==
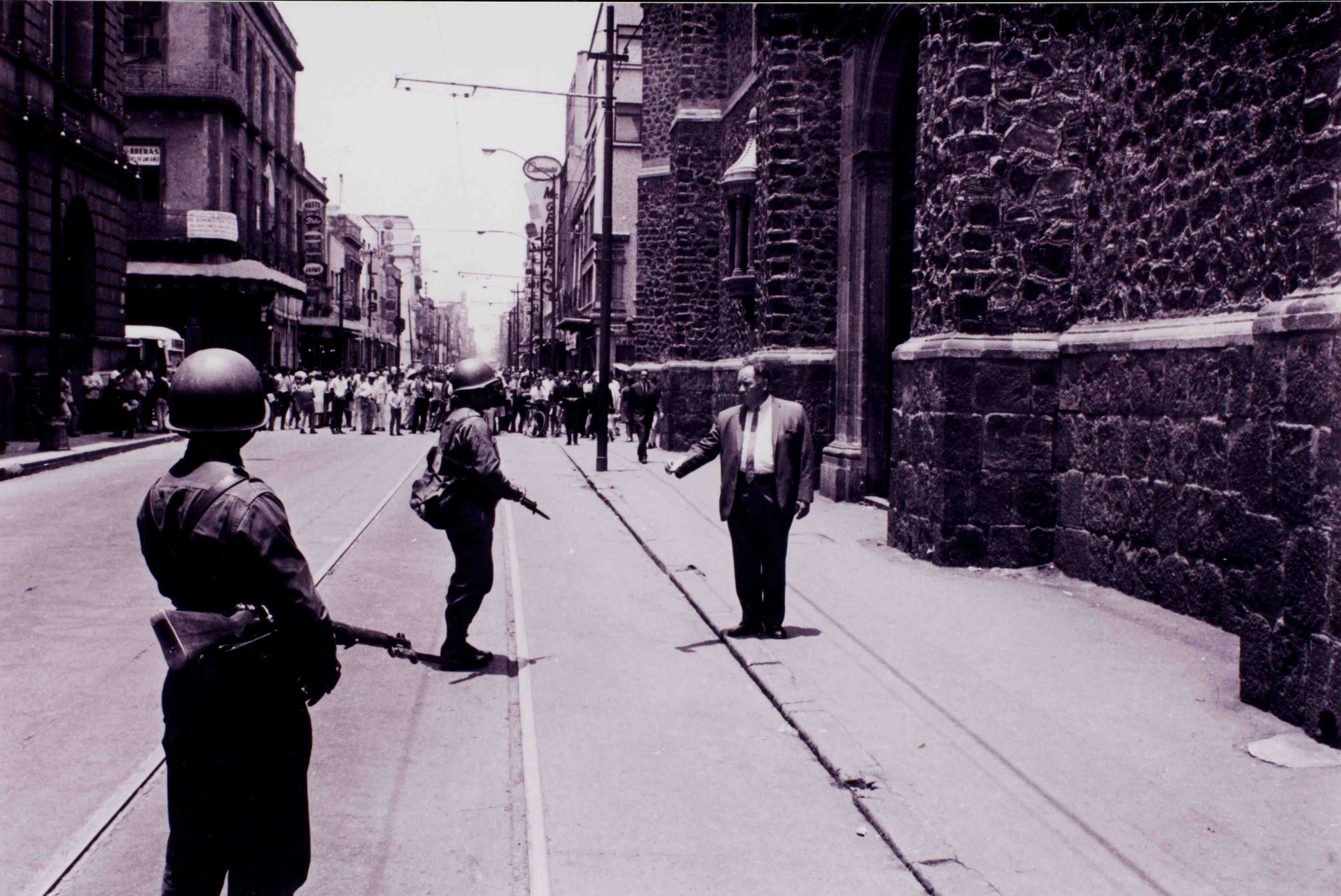
Soldiers of the Mexican Army in the streets

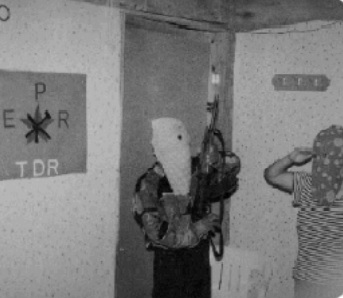
TDR-EP guerrillas during a revolutionary meeting

From the late 1960s to the 1980s guerrilla movements operated in the country. The worst attacks were the assault of the Madera Cuartel and Tlatelolco Massacre, the starting point for several guerrilla movements, specially in the states of Guerrero and Ciudad de Mexico. Groups included Partido de los Pobres, People's Guerrilla Group, or Liga Comunista 23 de Septiembre. These groups were demolished, amid allegations of extrajudicial executions or forced disappearances.

Eventually in the 1990s the guerrilla activity it would focus in states of Guerrero, Oaxaca (with bastions of the Ejercito Popular Revolucionario, Ejército Revolucionario del Pueblo Insurgente and Fuerzas Armadas Revolucionarias del Pueblo, Tendencia Democrática Revolucionaria-Ejército del Pueblo, these last splits of the EPR) and Chiapas this one gaining relevance with the Ejercito Zapatista De Liberacion Nacional

== Narcoterrorism ==
In 2012 United States politician Sue Myrick claimed that mounting evidence of Hezbollah presence in Mexico was ignored by the Department of Homeland Security. These groups became more visible by 2010, when the Tucson Police Department reported International Terrorism Situational Awareness for Hezbollah in Mexico, noting the arrest of Jameel Nasar in Tijuana. Nasar had tried to form a Hezbollah network in Mexico and South America. A report from the US House Homeland Security Committee Subcommittee on Oversight, Investigations and Management tied Middle East terror organizations with Mexican drug cartels.

Currently the violence related with the drug war represents the conflict of greatest generation of violence in the country, causing some attacks that can be branded as narco-terrorism like 2008 Morelia grenade attacks, 2009 Guanajuato and Hidalgo shootings and the 2011 Monterrey casino attack or the recently 2019 Minatitlán shooting.

== Anarchist groups ==
Anarchist groups in México have been on the rise since the beginning of the 2000s, with a large number of attacks to banks, religious centers and government buildings, especially intensifying during the government of Enrique Peña Nieto. Groups like Células Autónomas de Revolución Inmediata Práxedis G. Guerrero, Célula Insurreccional Mariano Sanchez Añón, Grupo de Ataque Insurrecto, Brigada Informal Bruno Filippi, Caos Espontáneamente Anónimo, Salvaje, Celula eco-anarquista por el Ataque Directo, Frente Subversivo de Liberación Global, Frente de Liberación Animal-Comando Verde Negro, Individualistas Tendiendo a lo Salvaje, and others. The most notorious incident with this group was the Monterrey Tech bombing. One of the first important attacks the Brigada de Eco saboteadorxs por la Venganza Nunca Olvidada claimed a blast in a Banamex branch in the municipality of Coacalco, that do not leave injured And two

In 2017 the CISEN (the Mexican civil intelligence institution at the service of the government of Mexico) said that these "direct violent actions" came from groups such as the Earth Liberation Front (52 actions), the Animal Liberation Front (44), Celulas Autónomas de Revolución Inmediata-Práxedis Guerrero (32), Federazione Anarchia Informale (30) and the Conspiracy of Fire Cells (12). In Mexico City, the Cisen documented the existence of the Campamento Revolución, Bloque Anarko Sur (responsible for assaulting a group of journalists during a demonstration in 2011), the Anarko Norte Bloc, the Black Anarchist Bloc, Chanti Ollin (House in Motion), the Magonista Autonomous Collective., the Anarchist Student Coordinator, Cruz Negra Anarchist and Okupa Che.

== See also ==
- 2019 El Paso shooting, far-right terrorist attack in the US border town of El Paso, Texas, that killed eight Mexican civilians
- Smuggling of firearms into Mexico
