= Francisco Barnés de Castro =

Mexican academic

Rector of National Autonomous University of Mexico
- In office 6 January 1997 – 12 November 1999
- Preceded by: José Sarukhán
- Succeeded by: Juan Ramón de la Fuente

Personal details
- Born: 11 September 1946 (age 80) Mexico City, Mexico
- Education: National Autonomous University of Mexico (BS); University of California, Berkeley (MS, PhD)
- Profession: Chemical engineer

Francisco José Barnés de Castro (born 11 September 1946, in Mexico City) is a Mexican academic and consultant. From 6 January 1997 to 12 November 1999 he served as rector of the National Autonomous University of Mexico (UNAM), the largest university in the Spanish-speaking world.

Barnés de Castro graduated with a bachelor's degree in chemical engineering from the National Autonomous University of Mexico and received both a master's degree and a doctorate degree in the same discipline from University of California, Berkeley. He is a long-standing academic and researcher at the National Autonomous University, where he has led the Faculty of Chemistry and served as rector until a major student strike, provoked by his proposal to significantly increase its tuition, forced him to resign.

In the public sector, he has served as Undersecretary of Hydrocarbons and Undersecretary of Energy Policy Technological Development at the Mexican Secretariat of Energy, as Director-General of the Mexican Petroleum Institute and Commissioner of the Energy Regulatory Commission. Overseas, he has worked as an international consultant for the Pacific Northwest National Laboratory of the U.S. Department of Energy and in the Joint Public Consultative Committee of the Commission for Environmental Cooperation of North America.

Barnés de Castro has authored more than 27 articles, proceedings and papers in specialized journals and over 15 on educational subjects. He has chaired the Mexican Institute of Chemical Engineers, the Mexican Chemical Society, the National College of Chemical Engineers and Chemists and he is a member of the Mexican Academy of Engineering.

== Controversies during his time as rector ==
The tendency toward reducing free access at UNAM and cancelling conventional admissions ("pase automático" system) from a neoliberalism perspective began during the rectorate of Jorge Carpizo McGregor, continued under José Sarukhán, and persisted under Barnés's period, who adopted these ideas as part of his presidency from the very beginning of his term.

Regarding the issue of conventional admission, in 1997 Rector Francisco Barnés de Castro presented a proposal to reform the automatic admission system, which led to the implementation of a selection exam for all the majority of ENP and CCH students. As a result, graduates of the ENP and the CCH would, from that point on, be the only ones to enjoy the benefits of the automatic assignation to university studies. Barnés faced opposition mainly from the CCH and some high schools, which organized protests against the so-called Barnés Plan.

Both completely eliminating the pass and ending tuition-free enrollment at UNAM proved impossible due to the opposition of the 1999 UNAM strike. Barnés would resign 207 days after the strike began due to pressure from the student movement, his inability to resolve the conflict, and his failure to implement the plan—a plan that Jorge Carpizo and José Sarukhán had also been unable to carry out.
