= Chanti Ollin =

Self-managed social centre in Mexico City, Mexico

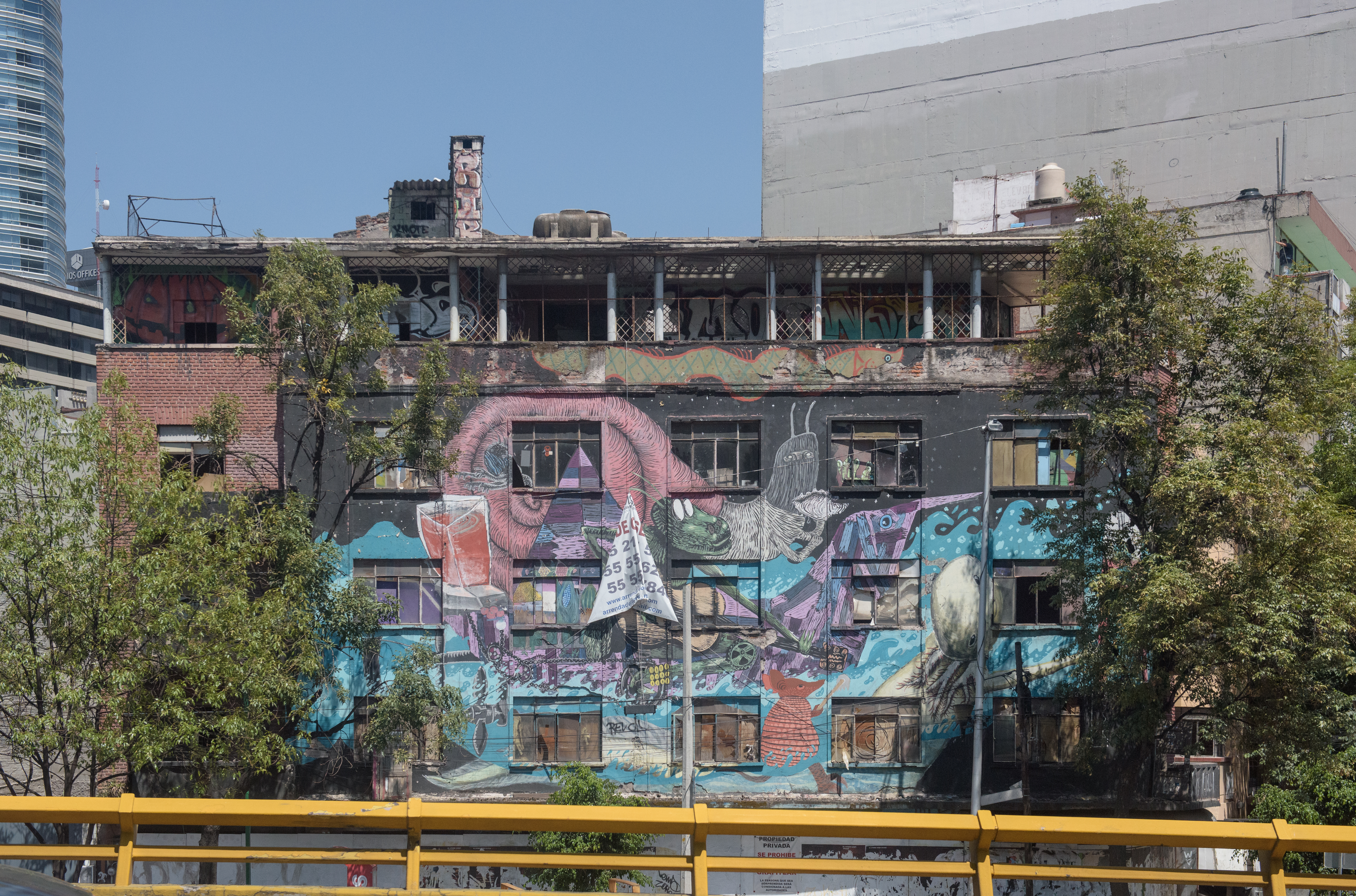
The Chanti Ollin building in 2022. It is still unoccupied after it was evicted in 2016.

Chanti Ollin was a self-managed social centre in Mexico City, Mexico, between 2003 and 2017. It was occupied in 2003 by students from the 1999–2000 UNAM strike and participants in Okupa Che. It was a derelict five storey building at Calle Melchor Ocampo 424 in Cuauhtémoc. The name means "house in motion" in the Nahuatl language.

Alongside other squats such as Okupa Che, Chanti Ollin was listed by the Mexican intelligence services as an anarchist organisation attacking the state. It was evicted and re-squatted in 2015. The squat was finally evicted in November 2016. Twenty five people were arrested and then released, and one Guatemalan national was deported. The squatters condemned the illegal eviction. A protest camp was set up outside the building which lasted until February 2017.
