= Peter Pedroni =

American econometrician and professor

- Born: Verona, Italy
- Education: Columbia University, Miami University
- Known for: Pedroni panel-data cointegration test
- Scientific career
- Fields: Economics, Econometrics
- Workplaces: Williams College; Indiana University Bloomington
- Doctoral advisor: Robert Mundell, Richard Clarida

Peter Louis Pedroni is an American econometrician and Professor of Economics at Williams College. An active researcher in economics and econometrics, his areas of expertise include stationary and non-stationary panel time series methods, international finance, economic development, and economic growth.

With over 17,000 references to his academic research, Pedroni stands among the most cited professors at Williams College.

== Career ==
Pedroni obtained his undergraduate degree in economics, math, and international affairs magna cum laude in 1986 from Miami University. He obtained a M.A. (1992) and a M.Phil. (1993) in economics from Columbia University, where he specialized in empirical macro, time series, and international finance. Under the supervision of Robert Mundell and Richard Clarida, Pedroni obtained a Ph.D. (1993) in Economics from Columbia University, writing his dissertation on Panel Cointegration, Endogenous Growth and Business Cycles in Open Economies. Between 1997 and 2000, he worked as a visiting assistant professor of economics at Boston College and Cornell University.

Between 1994 and 2003, he held the position of assistant professor of economics at Indiana University and Williams College. From 2004 to 2005, he held the title of visiting associate professor and Clayton Fellow in International Economics at Rice University. Since 2004, Pedroni has been a tenured professor of economics at Williams College.
