= Chela Rivas =

Mexican singer, songwriter, and producer

- Born: 17 August 1983 (age 42); Mexico City, Mexico
- Years active: 2008–present
- Labels: Sony Music Mexico

Chela Rivas (born 17 August 1983) is a Mexican singer, songwriter, and producer. She was born and raised in Mexico City, where she started writing songs at a young age. Chela's music blends pop, dance, and electronica, and she has become a recognized singer within the electronic dance music scene in Mexico. She is known for the songs "Location" and "Miss You". Chela Rivas has gained a significant following on Spotify, with over 200,000 monthly listeners.

== Early life and education ==
Chela Rivas was born in Mexico City, Mexico. She started writing songs as a child, and her passion for music grew as she received positive feedback and encouragement. Chela studied songwriting and music production at Fermata in Mexico City and participated in a summer program at Berklee College of Music.

== Career ==
Chela Rivas began recording songs and performing live with bands at the age of 15. Since 2015, she has performed as a solo artist. In 2009, Chela started experimenting with mixing pop music with dance and electronica, which gained the attention of the music industry and her fans. Her songs have become dance floor anthems and her music has started spreading throughout the United States, South America, and Europe.

Chela Rivas has had the honor to be the opening act for DJs such as Tiesto, Edward Maya, and Dash Berlin, and has had weekly live performances at nightclubs and festivals in Ciudad Juárez and other cities. Chela signed with a small label associated with Sony Music Mexico a couple of years ago but has not felt supported by them since signing. She recorded an album but has not been able to release it due to a lack of support. Since then, Rivas contacted Isina, a global talent search and development program.

== Personal life ==
Due to the war with drug cartels in Mexico, Chela has found it increasingly dangerous to travel to remote towns and perform.
