= José Sarukhán Kermez =

Mexican biologist (born 1940)

Rector of the National Autonomous University of Mexico
- In office 2 January 1989 – 6 January 1997
- Preceded by: Jorge Carpizo McGregor
- Succeeded by: Francisco Barnés de Castro

Personal details
- Born: 15 July 1940 (age 86) Mexico City, Mexico
- Spouse: Adelaida Casamitjana Vives (m. 1963)
- Children: 2, including Arturo
- Education: National Autonomous University of Mexico (BS); Colegio de Postgraduados (MS); University of Wales (PhD)
- Profession: Biologist
- Scientific career
- Awards: Tyler Prize for Environmental Achievement (2017); Champions of the Earth Lifetime Achievement Award (2016); Fellow of The Royal Society (2003); National Prize for Arts and Sciences; Fellow of El Colegio Nacional (1987)
- Fields: Population ecology, conservation biology, sustainable development, education
- Workplaces: National Autonomous University of Mexico

José Sarukhán Kermez (born 15 July 1940) is a plant biologist and ecologist. He is currently the National Coordinator for Mexico's National Commission for Knowledge and Use of Biodiversity (CONABIO). He received a B.A. from National Autonomous University of Mexico (UNAM) in 1964, a Masters from Postgraduate College (Chapingo), and a Ph.D. (Ecology) from the University of Wales. A known expert in the biodiversity of Mexico, Sarukhán's main interests include tropical ecology, plant population ecology, and the systems ecology of both temperate and tropical ecosystems, as well as training and education. He has published over 110 research papers and authored and co-authored several books.

== Career ==
Sarukhán was director of the Biology Institute at UNAM from 1979 to 1996. In 1987, he was appointed Vice Chancellor for Science at UNAM, and was Rector (President) from 1989 to 1997. He has been a professor in the Institute of Ecology since 1988 (emeritus since 2006). Sarukhán has been the driving force for the main ecological research group in Mexico and of the Ecology Institute at UNAM, which has more than 50 researchers and has produced more than 160 Ph.D. students, and for the Ecology Center in Morelia, Michoacán (CIECO).

Sarukhán has served as president of the Botanical Society of Mexico and the Mexican Academy of Sciences, president of the Association for Tropical Biology, president of the Latin American Union of Universities (UDUAL), and Coordinator of the Red Latinoamericana de Botánica. He helped establish the National Commission on Biodiversity of México and was appointed as National Coordinator of CONABIO in 1992. From 2000 to 2002, he was the Commissioner of the Social and Human Development Cabinet of the Mexican government.

== Fellowships ==
Sarukhán has been elected a Fellow of many professional societies, including the Association for Tropical Biology and Conservation (1996), U.S. National Academy of Sciences, the American Association for the Advancement of Science, the Royal Society, the Mexican Academy of Sciences, the National College, the Academia de Ciencias de América Latina and the American Academy of Arts and Sciences.

== Awards and recognition ==
Nine universities have awarded him honorary doctorates. He received the 2017 Tyler Prize for Environmental Achievement.

José Sarukhán Kermez is the recipient of the Lifetime Achievement Award (Champions of the Earth) in 2016.

In 1990 the Mexican federal government awarded him the National Prize for Arts and Sciences in the Physics, Mathematics, and Natural Sciences category.

In June 2025 he was appointed as Chevalier (Knight) of the French Legion of Honor by the French Government.
