= Okupa Che =

Anarchist social centre in Mexico City

Okupa Che is an anarchist self-managed social centre on the campus of the National Autonomous University of Mexico (UNAM) in Mexico City, Mexico. After the 1999–2000 UNAM strike, participants squatted the Justo Sierra auditorium and offices in the Facultad de Filosofía y Letras (School of Philosophy and Letters) on 4 September 2000.

The centre self-organises an infoshop, vegetarian cafe, library, summer school and various workshops. It also provides space for a pirate radio station and an art gallery. The centre has run campaigns such as opposition to the World Trade Organization Ministerial Conference of 2003 in Cancun and support for the victims of the 2014 Iguala mass kidnapping. In 2012, it hosted events connected to Yo Soy 132.

In 2014, the Federación de Estudiantes Campesinos Socialistas de México (FECSM, Federation of Socialist Peasant Students of Mexico) made a violent attempt to take over the centre and was repelled. UNAM then stated it wanted to repossess the auditorium and the anarchist occupiers refused to leave.

== See also ==
- Squatting in Mexico
