= 1999 UNAM strike =

The 1999–2000 strike and shutdown of the UNAM (National Autonomous University of Mexico, the largest university in Latin America) had its origins in the January 1999 announcement by its latest rector that tuition would increase significantly and graduation requirements would become more restrictive. In response, a large group of students declared a strike and blockaded the main campus to the point of institutional paralysis. The blockades intensified and eventually led to the university's closure, during which there were violent encounters between opposition groups, students, guards and faculty. The crisis led to the eventual resignation of the university's rector and appointment of a new one. Along the way, bloody conflicts resulted in serious injuries and even fatalities on the unlawfully occupied campus. Eventual action by the recently created federal police finally ended the occupation during February 2000.

== Background ==
The third article of the Constitution of Mexico states that all education imparted by the state is free. Whether this includes decentralized, autonomous institutions of higher education like the UNAM is a matter of (often heated) debate. Tuition at the UNAM is not free, and it had last been raised in 1948 to 200 pesos per academic year (tuition became 20 cents in the 1993 currency revaluation); the amount is specified in the University bylaws, and changing it requires action by the University Council (a legislative body that comprises representatives of the faculty and students, and all directors of schools, faculties, and institutes). By 1999, inflation and the exchange rate meant that tuition amounted to about 0.02 US dollars. The quality of education of the UNAM, alma mater of several Latin American presidents had decayed since its glory days. At the time, UNAM had a budget of about one billion dollars, of which 90% was provided by the federal government.

In January 1999, Francisco Barnés de Castro, then rector of the UNAM, announced his intention to raise tuition. Attempts to raise tuition since 1948 had failed twice before, most recently in the late 1980s under Rector Jorge Carpizo MacGregor. Barnés proposed a number of reforms, including a tuition raise from about 0.02 dollars to about 150 dollars per academic year. Barnés promised the additional 48 million dollars the university would receive from the tuition increase would be used to fund more research and increase the quality of its facilities; the proposal also included a plan for tuition remission for students who signed a statement saying they could not afford the new rates.

== Strike begins ==
A group of students quickly organized a protest, on the grounds that thousands of students would have to see their studies interrupted unable to afford tuition. With the support of the community, UNAM was shut down temporarily by the protesters during part of February and also part of March 1999. Ultimately on April 20, 1999, this group referred to itself as the Comité General de Huelga (CGH or "Strike General Committee") and declared a continuing, if not permanent, closure of the university.

In June 1999, the 132-member government council of the university, which includes faculty and students, modified the proposal to make the tuition increase voluntary. Barnés declared that the conscience of each student would dictate who would pay increased tuition and who would not. Strikers grew increasingly belligerent and had violent altercations with students who were still attempting to enter the campus to try to resume classes. Meanwhile, UNAM issued multiple warrants against strikers who were accused of stealing computers, vehicles and earthquake monitoring equipment.

== Public opinion ==
The strikers took advantage of the situation to resist additional graduation requirements such as tougher examinations and time limits for graduation. When this resistance became more widely known among the general public, community support decreased and the press adopted a less supportive stance towards those who perpetuated the blockades.

On June 2, after three months of the strike, president of Mexico Ernesto Zedillo spoke about the importance of the issue and what he termed the "brutal aggression against the university that is hurting the enormous majority who want to study to get ahead". The next day, about fifteen thousand students held a rally at a stadium in Ciudad Universitaria to support the strike and hurl insults at Rector Barnés. The same day, female professors held banners on Mexico City overpasses asking motorists to turn on their lights if they opposed the strike; thousands did so.

Strikers took their public displays to the heart of Mexico City, interrupting traffic for hours. City residents blamed Cuauhtémoc Cárdenas, then Head of Government of the Federal District and hopeful Party of the Democratic Revolution (PRD) presidential candidate in the 2000 elections, since many former student activists were members of the PRD.

Consulta, a polling firm, estimated an 83% of community support to the raise in tuition fees before the strike, versus only 55% support after the strike began.

== New rector appointed ==
In November 1999, Barnés resigned his position as rector of the UNAM. He had given in to some of the demands of the CGH; the CGH, however, kept extending the closure and making new demands. One of these demands was open admission for all students graduating from university-run high schools (some measure of which existed, but was contingent on a number of conditions including a sufficiently high GPA). In January 2000 the Junta de Gobierno appointed Juan Ramón de la Fuente, who had served previously as Secretary of Health in President Zedillo's cabinet, as the UNAM's rector. One of de la Fuente's first measures was a referendum to determine the opinion of students on the matter.

De la Fuente indicated that 125,000 votes (out of a student population of around 333,000) would be sufficient to give him more bargaining power to negotiate with the strikers. Around 180,000 students cast votes, 87% voting in favor of ending the strike. In spite of results showing overwhelming support to end the strike and return to classes, the CGH did not recognize the outcome. The CGH held its own poll in which 86,329 votes were cast, with 65% supporting a continuation of the closure.

== End of the strike ==
On February 1, 2000, students and workers opposed to the strike clashed with CGH and their supporters. This incident occurred when 200 students attempted to enter an UNAM-owned and run high-school, not on the main campus, to try to restart classes. 400 federal police officers were sent to open a way through the barricades, which they accomplished with many injuries, and even some fatal ones.

On February 6, 2000, federal police stormed the university's main campus, ending the takeover. A total of 632 people were arrested during that ultimate day of violent clashes.
