= Jorge Carpizo McGregor =

Mexican politician

Ambassador of Mexico to France
- In office 17 July 1995 – 7 September 1995

Secretary of the Interior
- In office 10 January 1994 – 30 November 1994

Attorney-General
- In office 4 January 1993 – 10 January 1994

President, National Human Rights Commission
- In office 6 June 1990 – 4 January 1993

Justice, Supreme Court of Justice
- In office 26 April 1989 – 1990

Rector, National Autonomous University of Mexico
- In office 1 January 1985 – 1 January 1989
- Preceded by: Octavio Rivero Serrano
- Succeeded by: José Sarukhán Kermez

Personal details
- Born: 2 April 1944 Campeche, Campeche, Mexico
- Died: 30 March 2012 (aged 67) Mexico City, Mexico
- Education: National Autonomous University of Mexico (LLB, SJD); London School of Economics (LLM)
- Profession: Jurist

Jorge Carpizo McGregor (2 April 1944 – 30 March 2012) was a Mexican jurist who occupied various high ranking positions in the government of Mexico. Carpizo was born in San Francisco de Campeche to Óscar Carpizo Berrón and Luz María McGregor Dondé. He received a bachelor's degree in law from the National Autonomous University of Mexico (UNAM), a master's degree in law from the London School of Economics and a doctorate in law from the UNAM.

From January 1985 to January 1989, Carpizo McGregor served as Rector of the National Autonomous University of Mexico. In the late 1980s he served as Minister Chief Justice of the Supreme Court of Justice of the Nation. In June 1990 he was appointed president of the National Human Rights Commission (the first ombudsman in Mexico). In 1993 President Carlos Salinas de Gortari designated him Attorney General, and he later became Secretary of the Interior. In the following administration, President Ernesto Zedillo designated him Ambassador to France.

Jorge Carpizo died in Mexico City on 30 March 2012 from complications following surgery.
