= Smuggling of firearms into Mexico =

Guns smuggled into Mexico

Mexicans have a right to own firearms, but legal purchase from the only two Mexican gun shops in Mexico City and Monterrey, controlled by the Army, is extremely difficult. In other cases the guns are obtained through Guatemalan borders, or stolen from the police or military, or bought from corrupt officials. Consequently, black market firearms are widely available. Many firearms are acquired in the U.S. by women with no criminal history, who transfer their purchases to smugglers through relatives, boyfriends, and acquaintances who then smuggle them to Mexico a few at a time. The most common smuggled firearms include AR-15 and AK-47 type rifles, and FN 5.7 caliber semi-automatic pistols. Many firearms are purchased in the United States in a semi-automatic configuration before being converted to fire as select fire machine guns. In 2009, a combined total of more than 4,400 firearms of the AK-47 and AR-15 type, and 30% of AK-47 type semi-automatic rifles seized in Mexico have been modified as select fire weapons.

There are multiple reports of grenade launchers being used against security forces, and at least twelve M4 Carbines with M203 grenade launchers have been confiscated. It was believed that some of these high powered weapons and related accessories may have been stolen from U.S. military bases. However, while many U.S. military grade weapons such as grenades and light anti-tank rockets are acquired by the cartels through the huge supply of arms left over from the wars in Central America and Asia, a report from the US Bureau of Alcohol, Tobacco, Firearms and Explosives (ATF) found combination weapons that were counterfeits whose specific courses could not be identified. It has been reported that there have been 150,000 desertions from the Mexican army during 2003 to 2009. Stated another way, about one-eighth of the Mexican army deserts annually. Many of these deserters take their government-issued automatic rifles with them while leaving. Some of those weapons originate from the United States. It has been determined that at least some of the M203 grenade launchers and M16A2 assault rifles cited above are of counterfeit origin manufactured for the cartels, possibly to resemble the weapons carried by the Mexican Special Forces.

== Gun origins ==
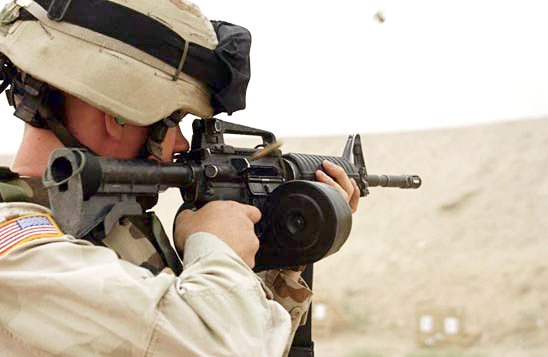
Beta C-Mag double drum magazine (locally called Huevos de Toro, Spanish for "bull testicles") on a M4 Carbine

The U.S. government, primarily through ATF, ICE and Customs and Border Protection, is assisting Mexico with technology, equipment and training. Project Gunrunner is part of the ATF's effort to collaborate with the Mexican authorities and its "cornerstone" has been the expansion of eTrace, a computerized system to facilitate tracing guns which were manufactured in or imported legally to the United States.

"According to [U.S.] Justice Department figures, 94,000 weapons were recovered from Mexican drug cartels in the five years between 2006 and 2011, of which 64,000 -- 70 percent, according to Jim Moran -- come from the United States." The percentages pertaining to the origin of weapons confiscated from organized crime and drug cartels may not be accurately reported. Said numbers represent only firearms Mexican authorities asked the US to trace (7,200 firearms) and that the ATF was able to trace (4,000 on file, of which 3,480 from US). US ATF Mexico City Office informed Mexican authorities ATF had eTrace data only on firearms made in or imported into the US and told them not to submit firearms that lacked US maker or US importer marks as required by US law. The guns submitted for tracing were only firearms that appeared to be US origin. The remaining guns were not submitted for tracing, or were not able to be traced. "In fact, the 3,480 guns positively traced to the United States equals less than 12 percent of the total arms seized in Mexico in 2008 and less than 48 percent of all those submitted by the Mexican government to the ATF for tracing. This means that almost 90 percent of the guns seized in Mexico in 2008 were not traced back to the United States."

Since 1992 (and as recently as 2009), the Congressional Research Service has stated that the ATF tracing system (eTrace) was not designed to collect statistics. Nevertheless, in February 2008, William Hoover, Assistant Director for Field Operations of ATF, testified before Congress that over 90% of the firearms that have either been recovered in, or interdicted in transport to Mexico originated from various sources within the United States. However, following a review by the U.S. Office of the Inspector General (OIG) in September 2010, the ATF admitted that “the 90% figure cited to Congress could be misleading because it applied only to the small portion of Mexican crime guns that are traced.” During this 2010 review by the OIG, the ATF could not provide updated information on the percentage of traced Mexican crime guns that were sourced to (that is, found to be manufactured in or imported through) the United States. The November 2010 OIG analysis of ATF data suggest a low percentage of successful weapons traces, ranging from 27% to 44%. In February 2011, Stratfor Global Intelligence calculated the number to be situated between 12% and 48%, and reported almost 90 percent of the guns seized in Mexico in 2008 were not traced back to the United States. The OIG analysis of ATF data concluded that ATF's attempts to expand gun tracing in Mexico have been unsuccessful. While the United States is not the only source of firearms and munitions used by the cartels, ATF says that it has been established that a 'significant' percentage of their firearms originate from gun stores and other sources in the U.S. ATF also says it is well-established that firearms traffickers often use the same routes as drug traffickers. Increasingly, ATF finds that Mexican cartels transport firearms and munitions into Mexico from Guatemala, situated on Mexico's southern border.

Although the number of trace requests from Mexico has increased since February 2006, most guns seized in Mexico are not traced. Moreover, most trace requests from Mexico do not succeed in identifying the gun dealer who originally sold the gun, and the rate of successful traces has declined since the start of Project Gunrunner. Most Mexican crime gun trace requests that were successful were untimely and of limited use for generating investigative leads. Senior Mexican law enforcement authorities interviewed by U.S. OIG officers do not view gun tracing as an important investigative tool because of limitations in the information tracing typically provides and because ATF has not adequately communicated the value of gun tracing to Mexican officials.

If ATF or Mexican police does not collect tracing information quickly, it becomes unavailable. In accordance with Mexican law, all guns seized by the Mexican government must be surrendered to the Mexican Army within 48 hours. It was determined that after the Mexican military obtains custody of the guns, ATF or Mexican federal police are unlikely to gain timely access to them to gather the information needed to initiate traces. Mexican Army officials interviewed by OIG personnel said their role is to safeguard the weapons and that they have no specific authority to assist in trafficking investigations. To gain access to the weapons, ATF officials must make a formal request to the Attorney General of Mexico for each gun, citing a specific reason that access is needed, demonstrating that the requested information is related to a Mexican criminal investigation, and providing a description of the gun with the serial number. Yet, if ATF had the gun description and serial number, ATF officials would not need to request access to the gun. Due to these barriers, ATF and wider Department efforts to gain access to weapons in Mexican military custody have not been successful. Because many weapons are transferred to the military before basic information is collected, and many weapons for which information is available are not traced, the majority of seized Mexican crime guns are not traced. The report states that the poor quality of the tracing data and the resulting high rate of unsuccessful traces suggest that the training is insufficient, training has been provided to the wrong people or there are other unidentified problems with Mexican law enforcement's crime gun tracing.

The final OIG report, which was released in November 2010, concludes that because ATF has not been able to communicate the value of gun tracing to Mexican law enforcement officials, they are less likely to prioritize their efforts to obtain tracing information from seized crime guns and enter it into eTrace. This hinders ATF's plans to deploy Spanish eTrace throughout Mexico. Because the expansion of tracing in Mexico is the cornerstone of Project Gunrunner, this presents a significant barrier to the successful implementation of ATF's Gunrunner strategy. The OIG report also revealed ATF has been unable to respond to many training and support requests from Mexican government agencies, and ATF's backlog of requests for information from Mexican authorities has hindered coordination between ATF and Mexican law enforcement. In addition, it was found that ATF has not staffed or structured its Mexico Country Office to fully implement Project Gunrunner's missions in Mexico.

In 2009, Mexico reported that they held 305,424 confiscated firearms, but submitted data of only 69,808 recovered firearms to the ATF for tracing between 2007 and 2009. Some analysts claim the sample submitted for tracing is preselected to represent the guns that Mexican authorities suspect are US origin. The US Congress has been informed that ATF agents working in Mexico routinely instruct Mexican authorities "to only submit weapons for tracing that have a likelihood of tracing back to the U.S .... instead of simply wasting resources on tracing firearms that will not trigger a U.S. source." This policy skews the pool of weapons submitted for tracing to weapons already suspected of being US origin. Gun-rights groups use the absolute number between seizures and traces to question whether the majority of illegal guns in Mexico really come from the United States. Gun control advocates use the 48% to 87% successful US origin trace rate to call for re-enactment of the sunsetted Federal Assault Weapons Ban of 1994-2004.

A significant source of Mexican cartel weapons is legal sales by U.S. gun companies to the Mexican military and police, sales approved by the U.S. State Department which after they arrive in Mexico end up in cartel hands. In 2011 CBS News reported "The Mexican military recently reported nearly 9,000 police weapons "missing."" A 2009 U.S. State Department audit showed 26 percent of guns sold legally to governments in Mexico and Central America were diverted to the wrong hands.

== Project Gunrunner ==
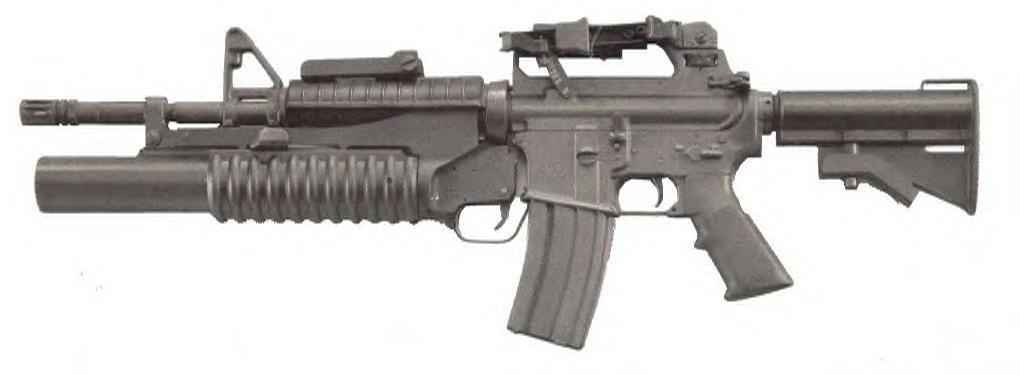
M4 Carbine with Grenade launcher (locally called Chanate, Mexican Spanish for "great-tailed grackle")

ATF Project Gunrunner has a stated official objective to stop the sale and export of guns from the United States into Mexico in order to deny Mexican drug cartels the firearms considered "tools of the trade". However, since 2006 under Project Gunrunner, Operations "Fast and Furious", "Too Hot to Handle", "Wide Receiver" and "White Gun" (all together satirically dubbed "Operation Gunwalker"), are alleged to have done the opposite by ATF permitting and facilitating 'straw purchase' firearm sales to traffickers, and allowing the guns to 'walk' and be transported to Mexico. This has resulted in considerable controversy.

According to ATF agents, Mexican officials were not notified, and ATF agents operating in Mexico were instructed not to alert Mexican authorities about the operation. Some ATF agents and supervisors strongly objected, and gun dealers (who were cooperating with ATF) protested the sales, but were asked by ATF to complete the transactions to elucidate the supply chain and gather intelligence. The gun-rights group Gun Owners of America accused the ATF of attempting to "boost statistics of seized firearms with American commercial provenance from Mexican crime scenes."

In 2011, KNXV-TV reported that weapons linked to the controversial ATF strategy were recovered in four police seizures of drugs and guns in the Phoenix area (two in Glendale, two in Phoenix).

As of 2011 report, total of 372 Fast and Furious firearms were recovered in the United States, and 195 were recovered in Mexico.

In 2010, Border Patrol agent Brian Terry was murdered in a shootout in Arizona with drug cartel members. Cartel member Manuel Osorio-Arellanes pleaded guilty in 2012 to first-degree murder in the case and was sentenced in 2014 to 30 years in prison; according to Osorio-Arellanes, four other cartel members perpetrated the attack. Two rifles from the "Fast and Furious" operation were found at the scene of the crime, but there is no evidence proving that Terry was killed with either of those guns.

== Trends in U.S. firearms trafficking ==
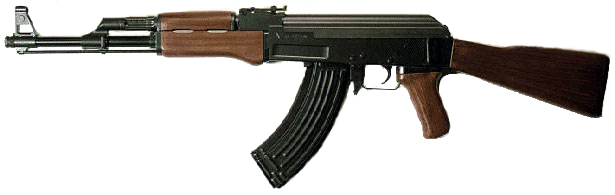
AK-47 style rifle (locally called Cuerno de chivo, Spanish for "goat horn", for its curved magazine)

Although there are about 78,000 gun dealers in the U.S., ATF suggested that gun shows, thefts and private sales may be a greater source of trafficked Mexican guns than licensed dealers. Gun smugglers are known to coerce or pay U.S. residents or citizens to purchase semi-automatic rifles and other firearms from gun shops or gun shows and then transfer them to a cartel representative. This exchange is known as a straw purchase.

There currently is no computerized national gun registry in the United States, but the Firearms Tracing System is partially automated thanks to registration records with individual names and addresses, along with other identifying information. ATF agents first query the five databases at the National Tracing Center by make, model and serial number. In addition, agents use another computer system (Access 2000) with an automated interface to 100 or more manufacturers, importers and distributors. If these methods do not help identify the gun, the agents telephone the manufacturer or importer, then work their way down the supply chain first by computer, then by telephone and as a last resort, by demand letter or in person. Tracing guns rarely relies on an actual paper trail, except with the first retail sale. Agents rarely pursue disposition of firearms beyond the first suspect (first purchaser), although the gun may have been resold several times since the first purchase. The average age of traced guns is over 10 years, and over 15 years for guns seized in Mexico.

It has been reported that more than 500 WASR-10 Kalashnikov rifles smuggled to Mexico were legally imported into the United States from Europe by Century Arms International despite a U.S. ban on the importation of certain configurations of semi-automatic rifles and full-auto rifles Other types of AK-47s were also recovered in 2009; for example, according to the Violence Policy Center, Mexico seized 281 Chinese Norinco Type 56s from January 1 to June 30, 2009, however, Chinese guns have not been imported into the United States since May 1994.

== Legislation ==
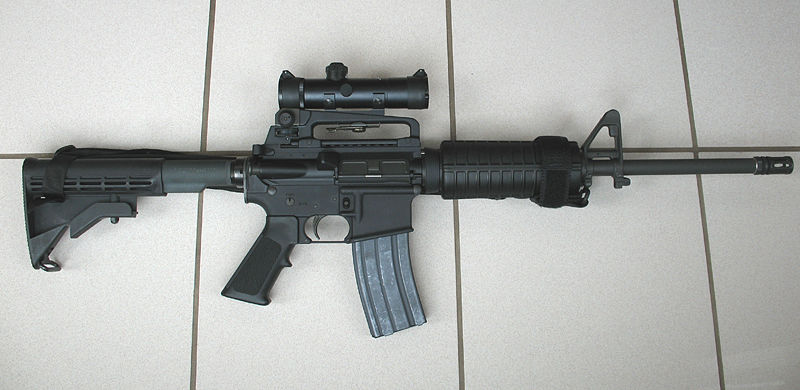
Colt AR-15 A3 Tactical Carbine

The United States House Foreign Affairs Committee has approved a bill (H.R. 6028) that would authorize $73.5 million to be appropriated over three years to increase ATF resources committed to disrupting the flow of illegal guns into Mexico. Lawmakers included US$10 million in the economic stimulus package for Project Gunrunner, a federal crackdown on U.S. gun-trafficking networks. As part of this effort, ATF outlined a path to full U.S. firearms registration in which it referred to web-based registration as the 'Gold Standard' of tracing.

In June 2009 Representative Connie Mack called for increasing the number of federal agents on the Mexican border. U.S. President Barack Obama has proposed to ratify an inter-American treaty known as CIFTA to curb international small arms trafficking throughout the Americas. The treaty makes the unauthorized manufacture and export of firearms illegal and calls for nations in the Western Hemisphere to establish a process for information-sharing among different countries' law enforcement divisions to stop the smuggling of arms, adopt strict licensing requirements, and make firearms easier to trace.

In October 2010, a spokesperson from the Violence Policy Center (VPC) declared that significant progress in limiting foreign weapon sales to straw purchasers could be made by enforcing existing gun control laws, such as the Gun Control Act of 1968.

== Sources of weapons ==
Weapon	Primary source
AK rifle variants (semi-automatic)	United States
AK rifle variants (select-fire)	Central America, South America, Middle East, Africa, Central Asia, South Asia, East Asia
AR-15 rifle (semi-automatic)	United States
M16 rifle (select-fire)	purportedly Vietnam
Fragmentation grenades M61/M67/MK 2/K400	United States, Central America, South Korea, Spain, Soviet bloc, Guatemala, Vietnam, unknown
RPG-7 /M72 LAW / M203 Grenade launchers	United States, Asia, Central America/Guatemala, North Korea
Barrett M82	United States
M2 Carbine (select fire)	Vietnam

Research has shown that many weapons and arms trafficked into Mexico are from gun dealers in the United States via straw purchasers. In response to a 2009 GAO report, the DHS pointed out that the "majority" were 3,480 U.S. origin guns of 4,000 successfully traceable by ATF. These were the arms investigated out a total of 30,000 firearms seized in Mexico 2004 to 2008. Most of the weapons end up in the hands of cartels.

== See also ==
- 2011 Mexican protests
- Crime in Mexico
- Timeline of the Mexican drug war
- List of Mexican cartels
- Mérida Initiative
- Blog del Narco
- Mexican Naval operations in the Mexican Drug War

== Bibliography ==
- Vulliamy, Ed, Amexica: War Along the Borderline, Bodley Head, 2010. ISBN 978-1-84792-128-4
- Grillo, Ioan, El Narco: Inside Mexico's Criminal Insurgency, Bloomsburry Publishing, 2011. ISBN 978-1-60819-211-3
