= Capture of Aguililla =

2021 battle in Aguililla, Mexico

- Part of the Mexican drug war
Date	6–28 April 2021
Location	Aguililla, Michoacan, Mexico
Result	Initial CJNG Victory: Aguililla recaptured successfully by the Mexican Army

Belligerents
Mexico	Jalisco New Generation Cartel

Commanders and leaders
(Mexico) Andrés Manuel López Obrador (Mexico) Silvano Aureoles	Nemesio Oseguera Cervantes

Casualties and losses
	1 killed; 6 wounded
- Cárteles Unidos: 26 killed; 2 wounded

The Capture of Aguililla was a battle between Mexican troops and the Jalisco New Generation Cartel (CJNG) in the town of Aguililla that left 15 dead. Aguililla is the hometown of CJNG leader Nemesio Oseguera Cervantes.

The CJNG began their assault on Aguililla by making blockades on the highways. Soon after, federal authorities met with the Governor of Michoacán, Silvano Aureoles, to find a peaceful resolution. The next day, police officers were attacked with drones carrying explosive devices, injuring two of them.

On 10 February 2022 authorities reported that members of the National Guard and Army retook the town and the traffic was restored in 43 towns located in the municipalities of Aguililla, Buenavista, Coalcomán and Tepalcatepec. Six long weapons, 23 improvised explosive devices, 21 vehicles, three of them with handmade armor, and equipment such as radio transmitters and bulletproof vests were also seized.

== See also ==
- Narcoculture in Mexico
- 2011 Mexican protests
- 2011–12 in the Mexican drug war
- Borderland Beat
- Blog del Narco
- Drug liberalization
- Mérida Initiative
- Naval operations of the Mexican drug war
- Timeline of the Mexican drug war
- Uppsala Conflict Data Program
- War on drugs
- Crime in Mexico
- Narcoterrorism
- List of ongoing armed conflicts
- List of journalists and media workers killed in Mexico
- List of politicians killed in the Mexican drug war
