= Tiahrt Amendment =

U.S. Department of Justice 2003 appropriations bill provision

The Tiahrt Amendment (/ˈtiːhɑːrt/ TEE-hart) is a provision of the U.S. Department of Justice 2003 appropriations bill that prohibits the National Tracing Center of the Bureau of Alcohol, Tobacco, Firearms and Explosives (ATF) from releasing information from its firearms trace database to anyone other than a law enforcement agency or prosecutor in connection with a criminal investigation. This precludes gun trace data from being used in academic research of gun use in crime. Additionally, the law blocks any data legally released from being admissible in civil lawsuits against gun sellers or manufacturers.

Some groups, including Mayors Against Illegal Guns, believe that having further access to the ATF database would help municipal police departments track down sellers of illegal guns and curb crime. These groups are trying to repeal the Tiahrt Amendment. Numerous police organizations oppose the Tiahrt Amendment, such as the Major Cities Chiefs Association (which represents the 69 largest police departments in the United States), the International Association of Chiefs of Police (IACP), the International Brotherhood of Police Officers, the Police Executive Research Forum, the Police Foundation, the chiefs of police of nearly every major city in California, and others. On the other hand, it is supported by the Fraternal Order of Police, which says it is "concern[ed] for the safety of law enforcement officers and the integrity of law enforcement investigations. For example, the disclosure of trace requests can inadvertently reveal the names of undercover officers or informants, endangering their safety. It may also tip off the target of an investigation." The Tiahrt Amendment is also supported by the National Rifle Association of America (NRA), which says that undoing the Tiahrt Amendment would lead to a rash of lawsuits against gun dealers.

== History ==
The Tiahrt Amendment was first added by Todd Tiahrt (R-KS) to the 2003 federal appropriations bill. It was signed into the law as part of this bill on February 20, 2003. It was subsequently broadened in October 2003 with the addition of two provisions banning the ATF from requiring gun dealers to inspect their firearm inventories and requiring the FBI to destroy background check data within 24 hours. In 2004, it was altered again, this time to limit access to gun trace data by government officials, and to ban the use of such data in firearms license revocations or civil lawsuits.

In 2008, the language was altered further, to explicitly allow ATF to publish information about statistical trends in the manufacture, import, export, sales, and criminal use of firearms.

ATF can also share some gun-trace data, individually or in bulk, with some law-enforcement agencies outside ATF.

== See also ==
- Dickey Amendment of 1996
- Gun law in the United States
- Gun politics in the United States
