= National Tracing Center =

Firearms tracing facility in the U.S.

The National Tracing Center (NTC) of the Bureau of Alcohol, Tobacco, Firearms and Explosives (ATF) is the sole firearms tracing facility in the United States. It provides information to provide foreign (international), federal, state and local law enforcement agencies with suspects for firearm crime investigations, detect suspected firearms traffickers, and track the intrastate, interstate and international movement of firearms. Congressional restrictions are in place to prevent the release of firearms trace information to anyone other than law enforcement agencies, however, this restriction does not apply to participating foreign countries or agencies. The only restriction is by memorandum of understanding (MOU) signed by the agency receiving ATF's eTrace software.

The NTC is located on a 10-acre (40,000 m^{2}) secure site in Martinsburg, West Virginia. This facility also houses ATF's Violent Crime Analysis Branch, Firearms Technology Branch, Firearms Testing Range, Brady Operations Branch, ATF's Gun Vault Collection, the Federal Explosives Licensing Center, Imports Branch, NFA Branch, and the Federal Firearms Licensing Center.

== Firearms tracing ==
Firearms tracing is the systematic tracking of the movement of a firearm recovered by law enforcement officials from the first sale by the manufacturer or importer through the distribution chain (wholesaler/retailer) to the first retail purchaser. Comprehensive firearms tracing is the routine tracing of every gun recovered within a geographic area or specific law enforcement jurisdiction. The ATF computer system used for firearms tracing is eTrace.

=== eTrace ===
eTrace is an ATF computer system which provides on-line trace submission through the internet, and provides the utilities for submitting, retrieving, storing, and querying all firearms trace related information relative to the requestor's agency. Distribution of eTrace to law enforcement began in January 2005. As of February, 2015, more than 5,600 U.S. law enforcement agencies and 41 foreign countries use eTrace. More than 360,000 trace requests were processed in fiscal year 2014. In December 2009, ATF released a bilingual version (eTrace 4.0) of eTrace allowing firearm traces in Spanish or English which has been deployed in Guatemala, Costa Rica and throughout Mexico. Recently, according to a 2016 GAO report, in 2013, Mexico restricted eTrace access solely to the Mexican Attorney General Office.

Foreign countries currently using eTrace include: Albania, Finland, Spain, Suriname, and the United Kingdom.

== History ==
=== History of Out-of-Business Record Systems ===
Before 1991, ATF kept the Out-of-Business records in paper hard copy filed at the Out-of-Business Records Center. In 1991, they began a major project to microfilm the paper records and destroy the hard copy. This project not only included the licensee's "Bound Book" (Acquisition/Disposition records), but also every ATF Form 4473, which contains name, address, height, weight, race, date of birth, place of birth, and driver's license number (or other ID). (GAO Report T-GGD-96-104, 04/25/96)

=== Computer Assisted Retrieval System (CARS) ===
In 1992, ATF began creating a computerized "index" (based on firearm serial number and dealer license number) to the microfilmed Out-of-Business records. Data was originally captured on minicomputers and transferred to a mainframe computer database. The retrieval system, called "CARS" (Computer Assisted Retrieval System), was disclosed in a 1995 letter to Tanya K. Metaksa of the National Rifle Association of America (NRA). By 2000, ATF revealed they had indexed 100 million such records, with over 300 million additional records scheduled to be added over the following two years. Over 400 million firearm transaction records were to be indexed by 2002 – about twice the total estimated number of firearms in the United States at that time.

According to gun rights advocates, which have long opposed any centralized, searchable registry of firearms sales, and notwithstanding the conclusions of the Government Accounting Office in 1996 that this system complied with legislative restrictions, this combination of automated and manual retrieval of individual sales records is a de facto system of registration of firearms, firearm owners and firearm transaction specifically prohibited by 18 U.S.C. 926(a).

=== Microfilm Retrieval System (MRS) ===
By March 2004, ATF acknowledged the existence of their advanced automated Microfilm Retrieval System (MRS) containing information on 380 million firearms with an additional 1 million firearms added per month. This system had been enlarged from the previous system (CARS) to contain not only firearm serial numbers, but the manufacturer and importer as well. Additional data fields have been added to help identify specific firearms.

More recently (since at least 2005), ATF has been converting microfilmed dealer out-of-business records to "digital images". It is not clear whether this is a digitized "picture" file of the microfilm, or a digital record of each individual acquisition/disposition. However, guns rights advocates take the position that, regardless of the storage method, and whether access to the detail A/D record is automated or manual, this system is a system of registration of firearms, firearm owners and firearm transactions prohibited by 18 U.S.C. 926(a).

In a paper presented to the United Nations Institute for Disarmament Research in Geneva, Switzerland, published in 2003, Gary L. Thomas, Chief, Firearms Programs Division, ATF, discussed the planned digitization of Out-of-Business dealer, importer, and manufacturer records, mentioned the projected cost, and noted it would not require any legislative or regulatory changes. Shortly thereafter, the digitization project appeared in the Congressional Appropriations Bill.

From the 2005 Appropriations Bill:

Conversion of Records. The conferees recognize the need for ATF to complete the conversion of tens of thousands of existing Federal firearms dealer out-of-business records from film to digital images at the ATF National Tracing Center. Once the out-of-business records are fully converted, search time for these records will be reduced significantly. The conference agreement includes $4,200,000 for the ATF to hire additional contract personnel to continue the conversion and integration of records.

However, according to guns rights advocates, Appropriations Bills since 1979 have prohibited centralizing these same records:

Provided, That no funds appropriated herein shall be available for salaries or administrative expenses in connection with consolidating or centralizing, within the Department of Justice, the records, or any portion thereof, of acquisition and disposition of firearms maintained by Federal firearms licensees:

In the 2008, Appropriations Bill, the Tiahrt Amendment further restricted the disclosure of data from the Firearms Tracing System.

== Firearms trace database ==
According to a Congressional Research Service report issued in 2009, "ATF has defined 'crime gun' to mean any firearm that is illegally possessed, used in crime, or suspected to have been used in crime. An abandoned firearm may also be categorized as a crime gun if it is suspected it was used in a crime or illegally possessed. Under this definition, most, but not all, traced firearms are 'crime guns.'" The CRS report notes certain methodological limits on firearms trace data: (1) traced firearms are generally those recovered by law enforcement, and so "may not be representative of firearms possessed and used by criminals" more generally; (2) "there remains significant variation over time and from jurisdiction to jurisdiction as to 'when, why, and how' a firearm is recovered and selected to be traced"; and (3) "a substantial percentage of recovered firearms cannot be successfully traced for several reasons including poor recordkeeping by FFLs." The ATF describes the firearms trace database as "an operational system designed to aid in ongoing investigations, rather than a system to capture 'crime gun' statistics." Despite these limitations, the CRS report notes "combined with multiple handgun sales reports and other investigative data, firearm trace data have proven to be a viable tool for ATF in targeting regulatory and investigative resources with greater effect."
