= Mérida Initiative =

Security cooperation agreement

- Logo of the Mérida Initiative
- Type: Security cooperation agreement
- Location: Mérida
- Sealed: October 22, 2007
- Effective: June 30, 2008
- Expiry: 2021
- Parties: Mexico; United States
- Language: English, Spanish

The Mérida Initiative (named after Mérida, the city where it was agreed upon), also called Plan Mexico (in reference to Plan Colombia), was a security cooperation agreement among the United States, the government of Mexico, and the countries of Central America, that ran from 2007 to 2021. With the declared aim of combating the threats of drug trafficking, transnational organized crime and money laundering, assistance between the countries included training, equipment and intelligence.

In seeking partnership with the US, Mexican officials point out that the illicit drug trade is a shared problem in need of a shared solution and remark that most of the financing for the Mexican traffickers comes from American drug consumers. U.S. law enforcement officials estimate that US$12 to 15 billion per year flows from the United States to the Mexican traffickers and that is just in cash and excludes the money sent by wire transfers. Other government agencies, including the Government Accountability Office and the National Drug Intelligence Center, have estimated that Mexico's cartels earn upwards of $23 billion per year in illicit drug revenue from the United States.

U.S. State Department officials were aware that former Mexican President Felipe Calderón's willingness to work with the United States was unprecedented on issues of security, crime and drugs. The initiative was announced on 22 October 2007 and signed into law on June 30, 2008. As of March 2017, $1.6 billion of Mérida assistance had been delivered to Mexico, including 22 aircraft.

== Background ==
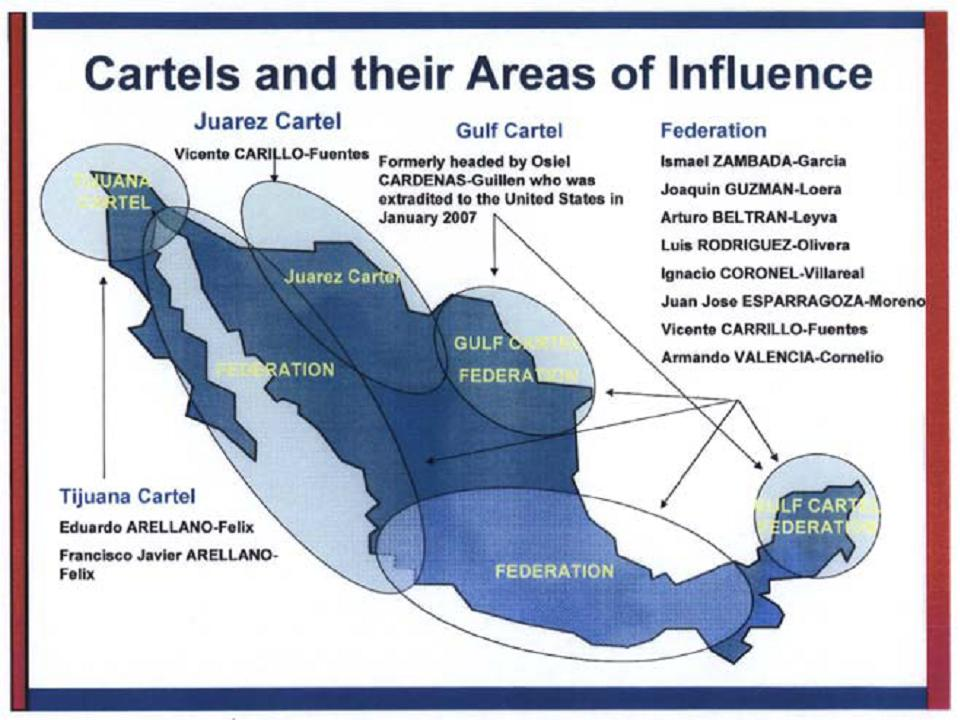
As of 2008

In 2008, Mexico remained a transit and not a cocaine production country. Marijuana and methamphetamine production did take place in Mexico and were responsible for an estimated 80% of the methamphetamine on the streets in the United States, while 1100 metric tons of marijuana were smuggled each year from Mexico.

In the 1960s and 1970s, Mexico was persuaded to be part of both Operation Intercept and Operation Condor, developed between 1975 and 1978, with the pretext to fight against the cultivation of opium and marijuana in the "Golden Triangle", particularly in Sinaloa. The operation, commanded by General José Hernández Toledo, was a flop with no major drug lord captures and many reports of abuse and repression in rural zones.

In 1990, just over half the cocaine imported into the U.S. came through Mexico. By 2007, that had risen to more than 90 percent, according to U.S. State Department estimates. Although violence between drug cartels has been occurring long before the war began, the government used its police forces in the 1990s and early 2000s with little effect. That changed on December 11, 2006, when newly elected President Felipe Calderón sent 6,500 federal troops to the state of Michoacán to put an end to drug violence there. This action is regarded as the first major retaliation made against cartel operations, and is generally viewed as the starting point of the war between the government and the drug cartels. As time progressed, Calderón continued to escalate his anti-drug campaign, in which there are now well over 25,000 troops involved.

It is estimated that during 2006, there were about 2,000 drug-related violent deaths, approximately 2,300 deaths during 2007 and more than 3,725 deaths during 2008. Many of the dead were gang members killed by rivals or by the government, however, some have been innocent bystanders. At least 450 police officers and soldiers have been killed since January 2007.

However, reporting of crimes in Mexico has historically been very low and inconsistent. In January 2012 the Mexican government updated its official count to 47,515 deaths since President Calderón began his military campaign against drug trafficking in 2006. Because crimes are seldom investigated there is no way of knowing if these deaths are attributed to organized crime, the police, or the cartels. Another report based on the Mexican census noted that 67,050 homicides had taken place in Mexico from 2007 to 2010 alone. Also, there was consistent resistance from the Mexican government to release new and accurate public records regarding the issue of homicides.

The National Drug Intelligence Center (NDIC) noted that cocaine availability decreased in several U.S. drug markets during the first half of 2007, mostly because of record 33.5 ton cocaine seizures by the Mexican Navy. However, it is estimated that the major drug trafficking organizations were reorganizing and readjusting to the new challenges facing their trade; as a result, drug availability in 2008 was once again on the rise.

One of the new adaptations was the use of home-made narco submarines; in 2006, American officials say they detected only three; in 2008 they were spotting an average of ten per month, but only one in ten was intercepted. Another development during that period was the consolidation of the smaller drug trafficking organizations into powerful alliances, escalating the violence between the groups vying for control of the narcotics trade to the U.S. Some 300 tons of cocaine were estimated to pass through Mexico to the U.S. yearly at that time.

== Funding ==
The U.S. Congress authorized US$1.6 billion for the three-year initiative (2007–2010). The U.S. Congress approved $465 million in the first year, which included $400 million for Mexico and $65 million for Central America, the Dominican Republic, and Haiti. For the second year, Congress approved $300 million for Mexico and $110 million for Central America, the Dominican Republic and Haiti. A FY09 supplemental appropriation provided an additional $420 million for Mexico; and, $450 million for Mexico and $100 million for Central America was requested for FY10.

$204 million of that was earmarked for the Mexican military for the purchase of eight used transport helicopters and two small surveillance aircraft. No weapons were included in the plan. The bill required that $73.5 million of the $400 million for Mexico must be used for judicial reform, institution-building, human rights and rule-of-law issues. The bill specified that 15% of the funds be dependent on Mexico making headway in four areas relating to human-rights issues, and on which the U.S. Secretary of State would have to report periodically to Congress.

An additional $65 million was granted for the Central American countries (Belize, Costa Rica, El Salvador, Guatemala, Honduras, Nicaragua and Panama); the House also included Haiti and the Dominican Republic. The bill was an attempt at a comprehensive public security package that sought to tackle citizen insecurity in Central America by more effectively addressing criminal gangs, improving information sharing between countries, modernizing and professionalizing the police forces, expanding maritime interdiction capabilities, and reforming the judicial sector in order to restore and strengthen citizens' confidence in those institutions.

Much of the funding never left the United States. It went toward the purchase of aircraft, surveillance software, and other goods and services produced by the U.S. private defense contractors. While this included equipment and training, it did not involve any cash transfers or money to be provided directly to the Government of Mexico or its private contractors. According to U.S. State Department officials, 59% of the proposed assistance went to civil agencies responsible for law enforcement, and 41% to operational costs for the Mexican Army and Mexican Navy. While the initial cost for equipment and hardware that the military required is high, it is expected that future budget requests will focus increasingly on training and assistance to civil agencies.

As of March 2017, $1.6 billion of Mérida assistance had been delivered to Mexico, including 22 aircraft. Congress provided $139 million in FY2017, and President Trump's FY2018 budget request included $85 million for the Mérida Initiative.

== Equipment ==
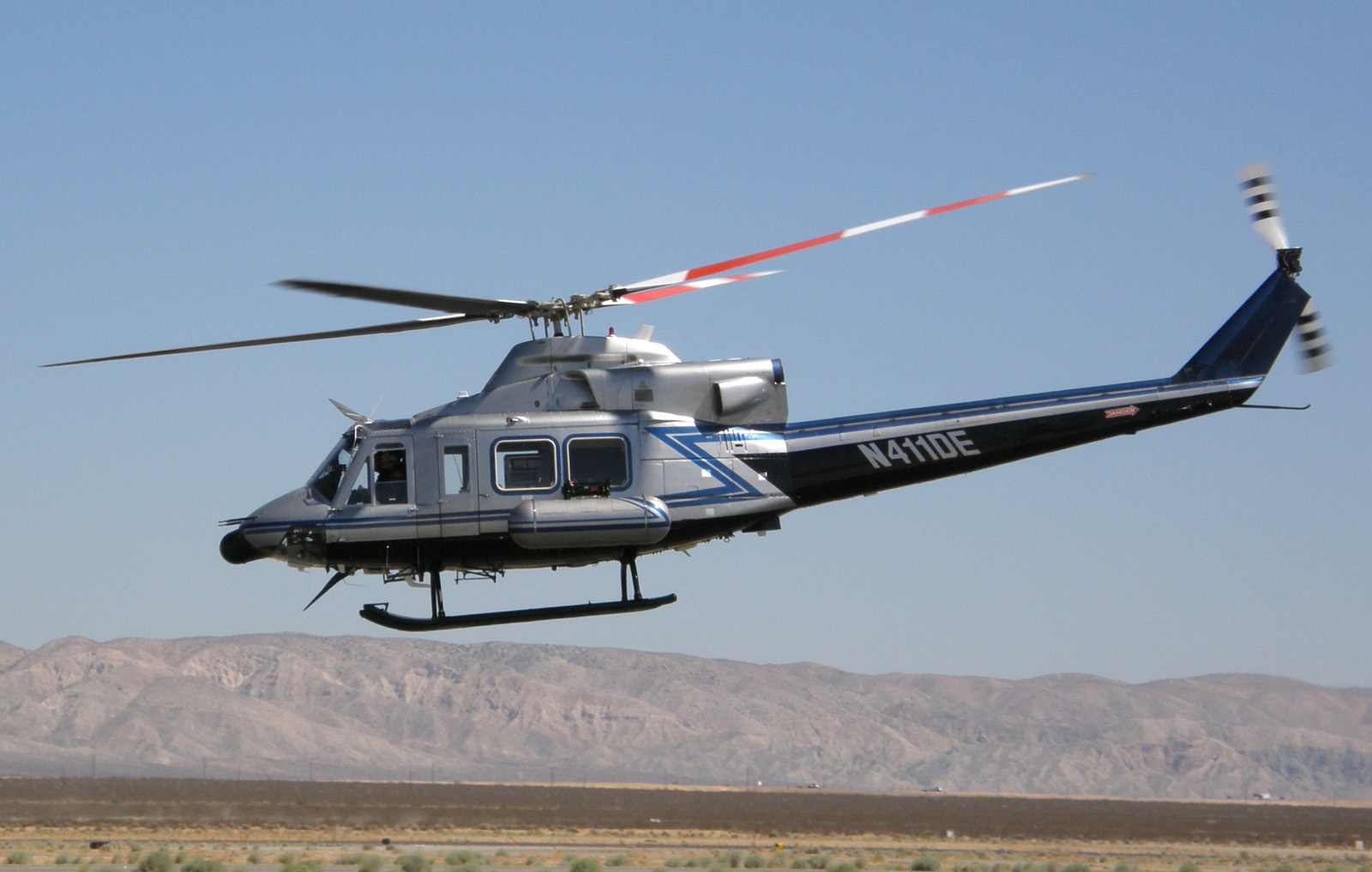
Bell 412 helicopter

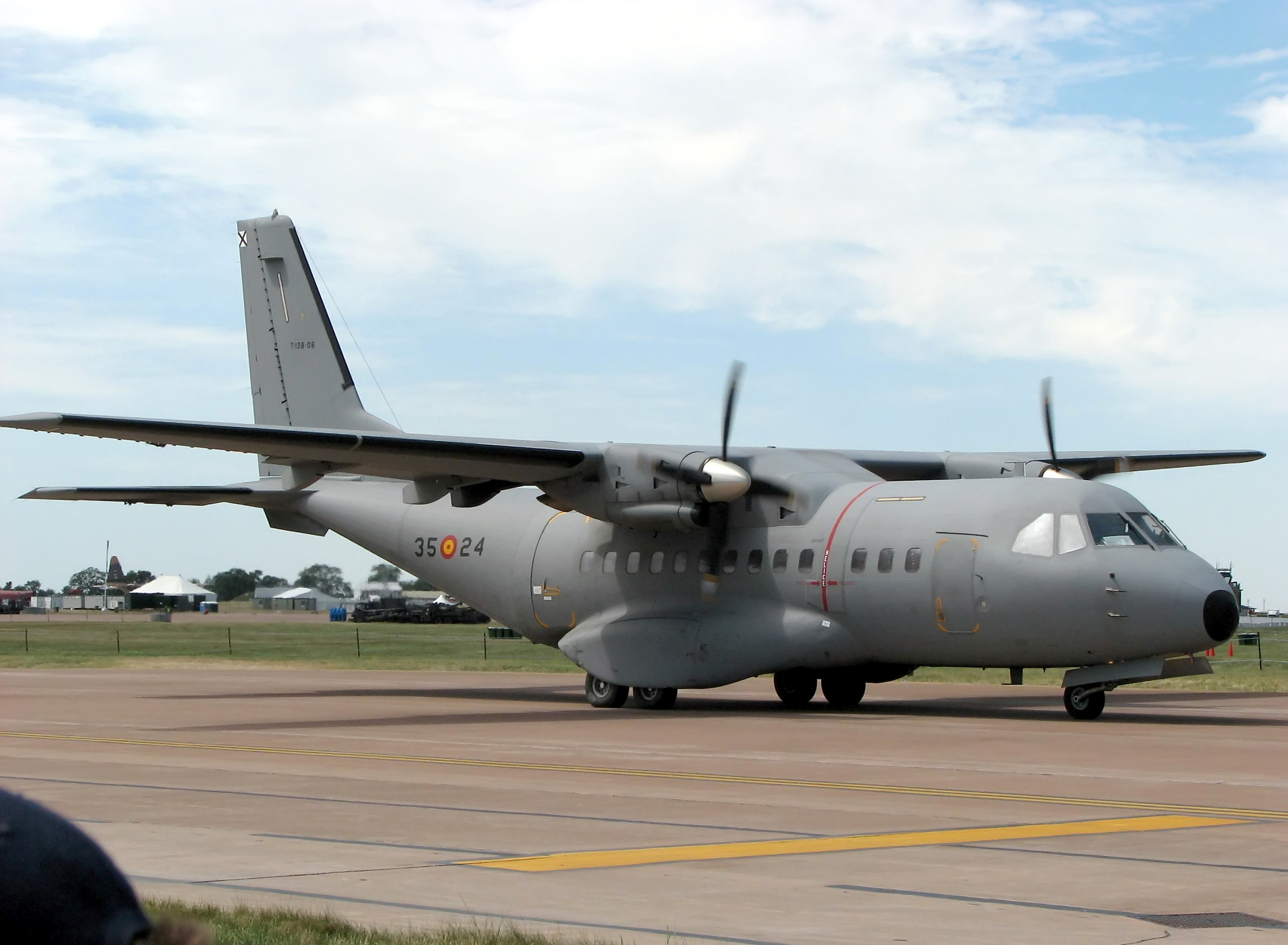
CASA CN-235 transport aircraft.

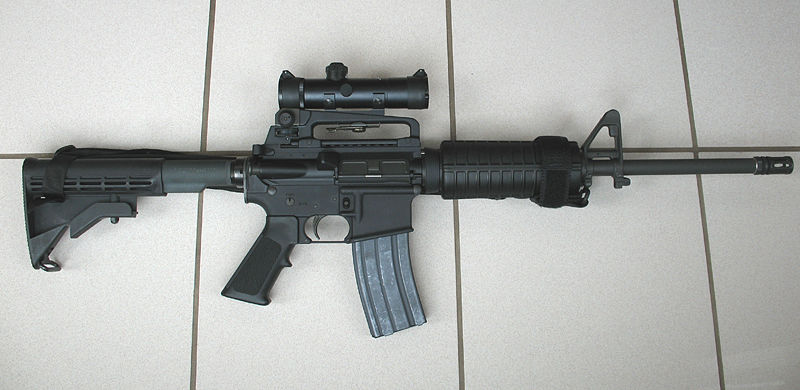
Colt AR-15 A3 Tactical Carbine

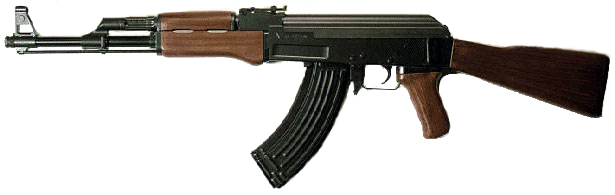
AK-47

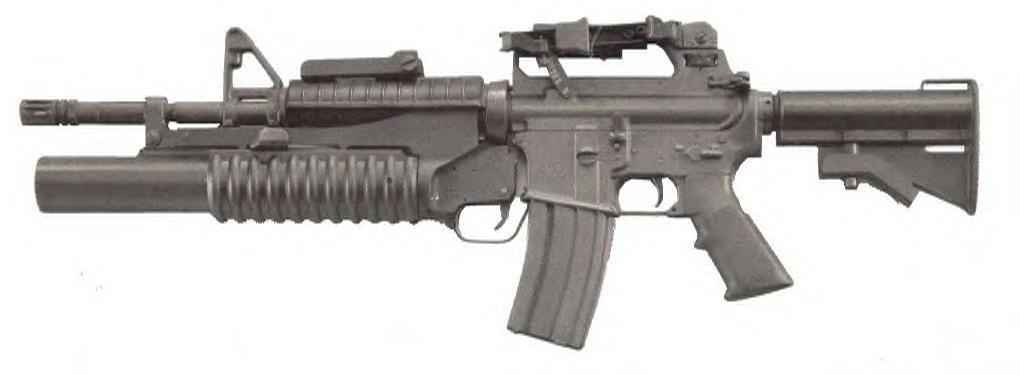
M4 Carbine with grenade launcher.

The Mérida Initiative has provided funding for:

- Non-intrusive inspection equipment such as ion scanners, gamma ray scanners, X-ray vans and canine units for Mexico and Central America.
- Technologies to improve and secure telecommunications systems that collect criminal information in Mexico.
- Technical advice and training to strengthen the institutions of justice, case management software to track investigations through the system, new offices of citizen complaints and professional responsibility, and witness protection programs to Mexico.
- Thirteen Bell 412 EP helicopters (5 with INCLE funds for the Federal Police and 8 with FMF funds for the military).
- Eleven UH-60 Black Hawk transport helicopters (three with INCLE funds for the Federal Police and 5 with FMF funds for the Mexican Air Force, and three for the Mexican Navy.)
- Four CASA CN-235 transport aircraft.
- One Reconnaissance Dornier 328JET
- Equipment, training and community action programs in Central American countries to implement anti-gang measures and expand the reach of these measures.

As of March 2016, the initiative transferred 22 aircraft to Mexican security forces.

== Smuggling of firearms ==
The Mérida Initiative included $74 million to be assigned for efforts by the U.S. government to stop the flow of illegal weapons from the U.S. to Mexico, but there were concerns regarding how that would be achieved. According to a Mexican government official, as many as 2,000 weapons enter Mexico each year and fuel an arms race between competing drug cartels. Since 1996, the ATF has traced more than 62,000 firearms smuggled into Mexico from the United States.

Mexican government officials suspected that corrupt customs officials, on both sides of the border, helped smuggle weapons into Mexico. As reported by ATF, the most common "traced" firearms now included AR type rifles, Kalashnikov derivatives, semiautomatic pistols, and a variety of assorted handguns and shotguns. Also, there were occasions where grenade launchers were used against security forces and twelve M4 Carbines with M203 grenade launchers have been confiscated. It was believed that some of these high power weapons were stolen from U.S. military bases.

An analysis of firearms trace data by the Bureau of Alcohol, Tobacco, Firearms and Explosives (ATF) over 2005-2007 showed that weapons were being traced to dealers in virtually every state, as far north as Washington state, and that Texas, Arizona and California were the three most prolific source states, respectively, for firearms subsequently illegally trafficked to Mexico.

Since 1996, the Bureau of Alcohol, Tobacco, Firearms and Explosives (ATF) had traced more than 62,000 firearms smuggled into Mexico from the United States. ATF officials reported that many firearms recovered and traced in Mexico came from U.S. gun dealers, and about 55% of these guns were identified as assault rifles. The Department of Justice, Office of the Inspector General, reported that only 18,585 out of the 66,028 firearms seized by Mexican authorities and sent for tracing were successfully traced to the United States in the years 2005–2009. Mexico only submitted firearms for tracing if it believed that there was a reasonable chance of them being from the United States.

In a 2009 GAO report, the DHS pointed out that there were only 3,480 U.S. origin guns of 4,000 weapons successfully traced by ATF out a total of 35,000 firearms seized in Mexico between 2004 and 2008. Mexican officials submitted approximately 32% of the guns they seized to the ATF for tracing. The ATF was able to trace less than half of the weapons submitted. Within Mexico, authorities and journalists stated that the vast majority of guns came directly from the U.S. But according to Fox News 83%-90% of the guns seized by Mexican authorities could not be traced.

ATF had computerized millions of firearms sales transactions from dealer "out of business" records, and multiple sales reports, effectively creating a large de facto national firearms registry. If the firearm cannot be found in the computerized records, agents contact the manufacturer or importer with a make and serial number, then work their way down the supply chain by telephone or on foot. ATF agents found that one in five of the seized Mexican guns could not be traced.

In 2008, the ATF received US$2 million to assist in the expansion of Spanish language eTrace software to Mexico and Central America region to assist them with firearms tracking issues, and their immediate goal was to deploy Spanish e-Trace software to all thirty-one states within Mexico. ATF provided Mexico (and Colombia) with its own centralized tracing center, staffed by nationals, with direct access to United States firearms transaction records maintained by the ATF National Tracing Center.

The ATF and U.S. Immigration and Customs Enforcement (ICE) implemented two enforcement initiatives named, Operación Armas Cruzadas (ICE) and Project Gunrunner (ATF), the latter of which was a target of a congressional investigation. In early August 2008, the FBI was engaged in 146 task force investigations, 12 of them in Texas, aimed at drug-smuggling groups and gang activity.

== Criticism ==
The Mérida Initiative was called "Plan Mexico" by critics, to point out its similarities to Plan Colombia, through which the U.S. has heavily funded the Colombian military, yet cocaine production had steadily increased and registered a 27% rise in 2007, before declining in 2008 and 2009

The plan required Mexican soldiers accused of human rights abuses in their country to face the civil courts rather than courts-martial. In response, members of the Mexican Congress raised objections because the conditions requiring monitoring of human rights violations were an infringement and violation of Mexican sovereignty, a particular point of sensitivity because Mexico was concerned with exercising its right to govern over its own country without foreign intervention. Mexican authorities were understood to be much happier with the final wording of the package, which contained the phrase "in accordance with Mexican and international law" in at least three of the conditions relating to human rights.

The bill required that $73.5 million must be used for judicial reform, institution-building, human rights and rule-of-law issues. By June 2008 some were concerned with the number of human rights abuses committed by the armed forces, some 800 in the first five months of 2008, double the rate from the year before. Most claims were filed for misconduct or illegal searches; yet some, though far fewer, were as serious as rape and torture. A growing number of citizens were concerned that the Mexican military was "becoming too powerful in the face of state weakness – a chilling reminder of a more repressive era." Calderón's use of the army in fighting drug cartels was questioned by rights groups, but political analysts say troops were his only real option in a country where as many as half the police might have been in the pay of drug gangs.

Some examples of Mexico's paramilitary abuses at the time included the sexual assault and rape of dozens of female detainees by police in San Salvador Atenco, and the disappearances of dozens of teachers in the state of Oaxaca in 2006, as well as the killings of seven innocent bystanders, including the American journalist Brad Will by off-duty policemen. Almost half of Mexican police officers examined in 2008 failed background and security tests, a figure that rose to nearly 9 of 10 policemen in the border state of Baja California.

Others criticized the continued support of combating the supply of drugs rather than focusing on prevention, treatment and education programs to curb demand. Studies showed that military interdiction efforts failed because they ignored the root cause of the problem: U.S. demand. During the early to mid-1990s, the Clinton administration ordered and funded a major cocaine policy study by the Rand Drug Policy Research Center; the study concluded that $3 billion USD should be switched from federal and local law enforcement to treatment. The report said that treatment is the cheapest and most effective way to cut drug use. President Clinton's drug czar's office rejected slashing law enforcement spending. The Bush administration proposed cutting spending on drug treatment and prevention programs by $73 million, or 1.5%, in the 2009 budget. The Fiscal Year 2011 National Drug Control Budget proposed by the Obama Administration devoted significant new resources to the prevention and treatment of drug abuse.

=== Torture training ===
Human rights activists and other policy groups criticize the Initiative's lack of a robust framework for institution building and the existence of coerced confessions, often through the use of torture. In early July 2008, a video emerged of city police officers from León, Guanajuato, being taught torture methods by a U.S. security firm instructor; the video created an uproar in Mexico, which has struggled to eliminate torture in law enforcement. It is still unclear how this event will affect the Mérida Initiative, as it can be used both to reinforce the need to train security forces on human rights or to cancel the initiative altogether.

The training took place in April 2006 and lasted for 12 days. León Mayor, Vicente Guerrero Reynoso, initially insisted that the training would continue, justifying the training as a means of withstanding torture under kidnapping scenarios. However, because of the public furor and under pressure from federal and state authorities, he suspended the program.

A portion of the funding under the Mérida Initiative will be released only if the U.S. Secretary of State reports that Mexico bars the use of testimony that has been obtained through torture, a policy that is in line with Mexican law but often is not observed.

=== Project Gunrunner ===
Chairman of the House Oversight Committee, Darrell Issa, said the Department of Justice had "blood on their hands" for the ATF Project Gunrunner, which saw 2,020 firearms illegally bought and shipped to Mexico under ATF supervision. US gun rights activists and other gun policy groups have called Project Gunrunner an attempt to undermine gun rights in the US and have called for a resignation of Attorney General Eric Holder.

In Mexico, Manuel J. Jauregui of the Reforma newspaper wrote, "In sum, the gringo (American) government has been sending weapons to Mexico in a premeditated and systematic manner, knowing that their destinations were Mexican criminal organizations." Like many politicians, Mexican pundits across the political spectrum expressed anger at news of the operations. La Jornada, a left-leaning newspaper, asked "US: ally or enemy?" The paper also argued that the Mérida Initiative should be immediately suspended. A right-leaning paper accused the US of violating Mexican sovereignty.

== Progress ==
On July 10, 2008, the Mexican government announced plans to nearly double the size of its Federal Preventive Police force in order to reduce the role of the military in combating drug trafficking. The plan, known as the Comprehensive Strategy Against Drug Trafficking, also involves purging local police forces of corrupt officers. Elements of the plan have already been set in motion, including a massive police recruiting and training effort intended to reduce the country's dependence in the drug war on the military. As part of the initiative, Mexico is already receiving information about suspicious ships leaving ports in Colombia and Ecuador.

In August 2008, Mexico announced that two states, Chihuahua and Nuevo León, are pioneering public trials, in which the state must prove its case. Before, the accused bore the burden of proof, and trials were secret. Mexico's president hopes this will bring transparency and accountability to the legal process and to end a tradition of corruption, shoddy investigations, coerced testimony, and an extremely low conviction rate.

Early December 2008, the US released $197 million of aid to Mexico. Most of this aid will pay for helicopters and other equipment to fight violent drug cartels. By early 2009 the US government released another $99 million which will go toward buying aircraft and inspection equipment for the Mexican military. The US has thus far released $300 million of the $400 million appropriated for Mexico.

During the 5th Summit of the Americas in April 2009, the leaders of several Caribbean nations stated to a group of U.S. congressmen that they have a desire to join the Mérida Initiative, as a crackdown in Mexico could push drug traffickers' operations into their island nations. This directly led to the formation of the Caribbean Basin Security Initiative (CBSI) as a complement of the Mérida Initiative.

Inaugurated to a six-year term in December 2012, Mexican President Enrique Peña Nieto has continued U.S.-Mexican security cooperation.

As of March 2016, the US Congress is continuing to fund and oversee the Mérida Initiative and related domestic initiatives. Congress provided $139 million in Mérida Initiative accounts in the FY2016 and is now considering the Obama Administration's FY2017 budget request of $129 million for the Mérida Initiative. The Mexican government is under pressure, however, to comply with recommendations on preventing torture and forced disappearances. There have been ongoing concerns about the human rights records of Mexico's military and police, particularly given the 2014 Iguala mass kidnapping involving allegations of their involvement in torture, enforced disappearances, and extrajudicial killings.

The newly elected president, Andrés Manuel López Obrador, declared in May 2019 that Mexico is withdrawing from the Mérida Initiative, and will instead seek a pact in support of a development plan for Central America to control migration.

Security cooperation between Mexico and the US steadily declined from 2018. The Mexican federal government stopped approving most Mérida Initiative programs, and the arrangement was considered dead in 2021. That October, after the 200th anniversary of Mexican Independence and relations with the US, the two governments announced the U.S.-Mexico Bicentennial Framework for Security, Public Health, and Safe Communities an agreement intended to replace the Mérida Initiative and focus more on economic development.

== See also ==
- Mexico–United States relations
- Mexico–United States border
- Mexican drug war
- Office of National Drug Control Policy
- Project Coronado

Regional:

- Plan Colombia
