= Project Gunrunner =

ATF project

Project Gunrunner is a project of the U.S. Bureau of Alcohol, Tobacco, Firearms and Explosives (ATF) intended to stem the flow of firearms into Mexico, in an attempt to deprive the Mexican drug cartels of weapons.

The primary tactic of Project Gunrunner is interdiction of straw purchasers and unlicensed dealers to prevent legal guns from entering the black market; between 2005 and 2008, 650 such cases involving 1,400 offenders and 12,000 firearms were referred for prosecution. However, other tactics ("gunwalking" and "controlled delivery") have led to controversy.

In early 2011, the project became controversial when it was revealed that Operation Wide Receiver (2006–2007) and Operation Fast and Furious (2009–2010) had allowed guns to "walk" into the hands of Mexican drug cartels.

== History ==
The ATF began Project Gunrunner as a pilot project in Laredo, Texas, in 2005 and expanded it as a national initiative in 2006. Project Gunrunner is also part of the Department of Justice's broader Southwest Border Initiative, which seeks to reduce cross-border drug and firearms trafficking and the high level of violence associated with these activities on both sides of the border.

The ATF determined that the Mexican cartels had become the leading gun trafficking organizations operating in the southwest U.S. and is working in collaboration with other agencies and the Government of Mexico to expand the eTrace firearm tracing software system. eTrace provides web based access to the ATF's Firearms Tracing System to allow law enforcement both domestically and internationally the ability to trace firearms encountered in connection with a criminal investigation to the first recorded purchaser (who may have innocently sold the gun years ago). eTrace allows law enforcement to access their trace results directly (name and address of first purchaser) and offers the ability to generate statistical reports to analyze their trace data to estimate firearms trafficking trends or patterns.

The ATF announced a goal to deploy eTrace software to all thirty-one Mexican states. As part of eTrace expansion, the ATF continues to provide training to Mexican and Central American countries to ensure that the technology is utilized to a greater extent. Colombia and Mexico were provided with their own in-country tracing centers with full access to the ATF firearm registration records. In Colombia, a joint ATF–CNP Center for Anti-Explosives Information and Firearms Tracing (CIARA) opened on 6 December 2006.

In Mexico, The National Center for Information, Analysis and Planning in order to Fight Crime (CENAPI) was established in 2003. The ATF states these are models for planned future tracing centers throughout Central and South America and the Caribbean Basin. In December, 2009, the ATF announced deployment of a Spanish version of eTrace to Mexico, Guatemala and Costa Rica.

A planned second phase will release the software to all Spanish-speaking countries with agreements with the ATF. In June 2011 Congress opened an investigation into Project Gunrunner against the ATF, as some ATF agents have come forward stating that top heads in the ATF and the Department of Justice instructed the agents to encourage gun stores in the U.S. to sell assault-style weapons to Mexican firearm traffickers.

== Budget ==
In 2009, the American Recovery and Reinvestment Act of 2009 provided $40 million to state and local law enforcement agencies. This money was primarily slated for competitive grants to provide assistance and equipment to local law enforcement along the southern border; and, in high-intensity drug trafficking areas, to combat criminal narcotics activity stemming from the southern border. $10 million of the money was to be transferred to the BATF for Project Gunrunner to hire personnel and open facilities in 6 new locations. The use of "stimulus" money to fund Project Gunrunner is controversial, given the ATF Phoenix Field Division's reported initiative of allowing known criminals to purchase guns in an effort to gain intelligence on the cartels (Operation Fast and Furious).

In addition, the FY 2009 Omnibus Appropriations Act provided the ATF with an additional 5 million for Project Gunrunner.

== Participants ==
Countries have access to American gun owner identities and information (first purchaser only) as a result of traces of recovered firearms contained in the database. In GAO Report 09-709, the ATF reports the National Tracing Center, "conducts the gun traces, and returns information on their findings to the submitting party".

The ATF has commissioned approximately 100 special agents and 25 industry operations investigators to the initiative, and is increasing its intelligence activities with other EPIC law enforcement partners stationed at the border, including the Federal Bureau of Investigation (FBI), the Drug Enforcement Administration (DEA), Immigration and Customs Enforcement (ICE), Customs and Border Protection (CBP) and the Texas Department of Public Safety. The ATF also works closely with these agencies' task forces which operate along the Southwest border, sharing intelligence, and conducting joint investigations.

== Operations ==
By early 2009, Project Gunrunner had resulted in approximately 650 cases by the ATF, in which more than 1,400 defendants were referred for prosecution in federal and state courts and more than 12,000 firearms were involved.

According to the U.S. Government Accountability Office (GAO), during FY 2007 and 2008, the ATF conducted 12 eTrace training sessions for Mexican police (over 961 Mexican police officers) in several Mexican cities, including the same cities where corrupt police were disarmed and arrested: Mexico City, Tijuana, Nuevo Laredo, and Matamoros. Despite the GAO report, the ATF claimed in October 2010 only about 20 people have been trained to use eTrace in Mexico. This discrepancy has not been explained. With the assistance of the ATF's Mexico City office and the Narcotics Affairs Section of the U.S. Department of State, the ATF anticipated conducting numerous additional courses in these subject areas in 2009. According to Mexican government officials, corruption pervades all levels of Mexican law enforcement—federal, state, and local.

The ATF reported they analyzed firearms seizures in Mexico from FY 2005-07 and identified the following weapons most commonly used by drug traffickers. However this conclusion is seriously flawed and not supported by ATF statistics, which only includes guns successfully traced and these are not necessarily connected to drug traffickers. The number of trace requests from Mexico has increased since FY 2006, but most seized guns in Mexico have not been traced as only guns originally from the United States are traced.

== Controversy ==
Project Gunrunner has a stated official objective to stop the sale and export of guns from the United States into Mexico in order to deny Mexican drug cartels the firearms considered "tools of the trade". However, since 2006 under Operation Wide Receiver (2006-2007), Hernandez Case (2007), Medrano Case (2008) and Operation Fast and Furious (2009-2011), the Phoenix offices of the ATF and USAO did the opposite by permitting, encouraging and facilitating 'straw purchase' firearm sales to traffickers, and allowing the guns to 'walk' and be transported to Mexico. The gun-rights group Gun Owners of America accused the ATF of attempting to "boost statistics of seized firearms with American commercial provenance from Mexican crime scenes."

In October 2011, documents were released that indicated Justice Department officials were sent memos in regard to Operation Fast and Furious in 2010. According to ATF agents, Mexican officials were not notified, and ATF agents operating in Mexico were instructed not to alert Mexican authorities about the operation. Under Fast and Furious, the ATF attache at the Mexico City Office (MCO) was not notified (unlike Wide Receiver and most other cases).

Some ATF agents and supervisors strongly objected, and gun dealers (who were cooperating with the ATF) protested the sales, but were asked by the ATF to complete the transactions to expose the supply chain and gather intelligence. It has been established that this operation violated long-established ATF policies and practices and that it is not a recognized investigative technique.

In 2011, KNXV-TV reported that weapons linked to the controversial ATF strategy were recovered in four police seizures of drugs and guns in the Phoenix area (two in Glendale, two in Phoenix).

As of a 2011 report, total of 372 Fast and Furious firearms were recovered in the United States, and 195 were recovered in Mexico.

During Fast and Furious, ATF Phoenix did interdict 105 guns. However, at least 1,856 guns were allowed to walk. Other U.S. agencies, federal, state and local, recovered nearly 270 at crime scenes in the U.S. and 195 Fast and Furious origin guns were recovered by Mexican police at Mexican crime scenes.

In 2010, Border Patrol agent Brian Terry was murdered in a shootout in Arizona with drug cartel members. Cartel member Manuel Osorio-Arellanes pleaded guilty in 2012 to first-degree murder in the case and was sentenced in 2014 to 30 years in prison; according to Osorio-Arellanes, four other cartel members perpetrated the attack. Two rifles from the "Fast and Furious" operation were found at the scene of the crime, but there is no evidence proving that Terry was killed with either of those guns.

== See also ==
- Mérida Initiative
- Mexican drug war
