= ETrace =

Firearm trace request submission system

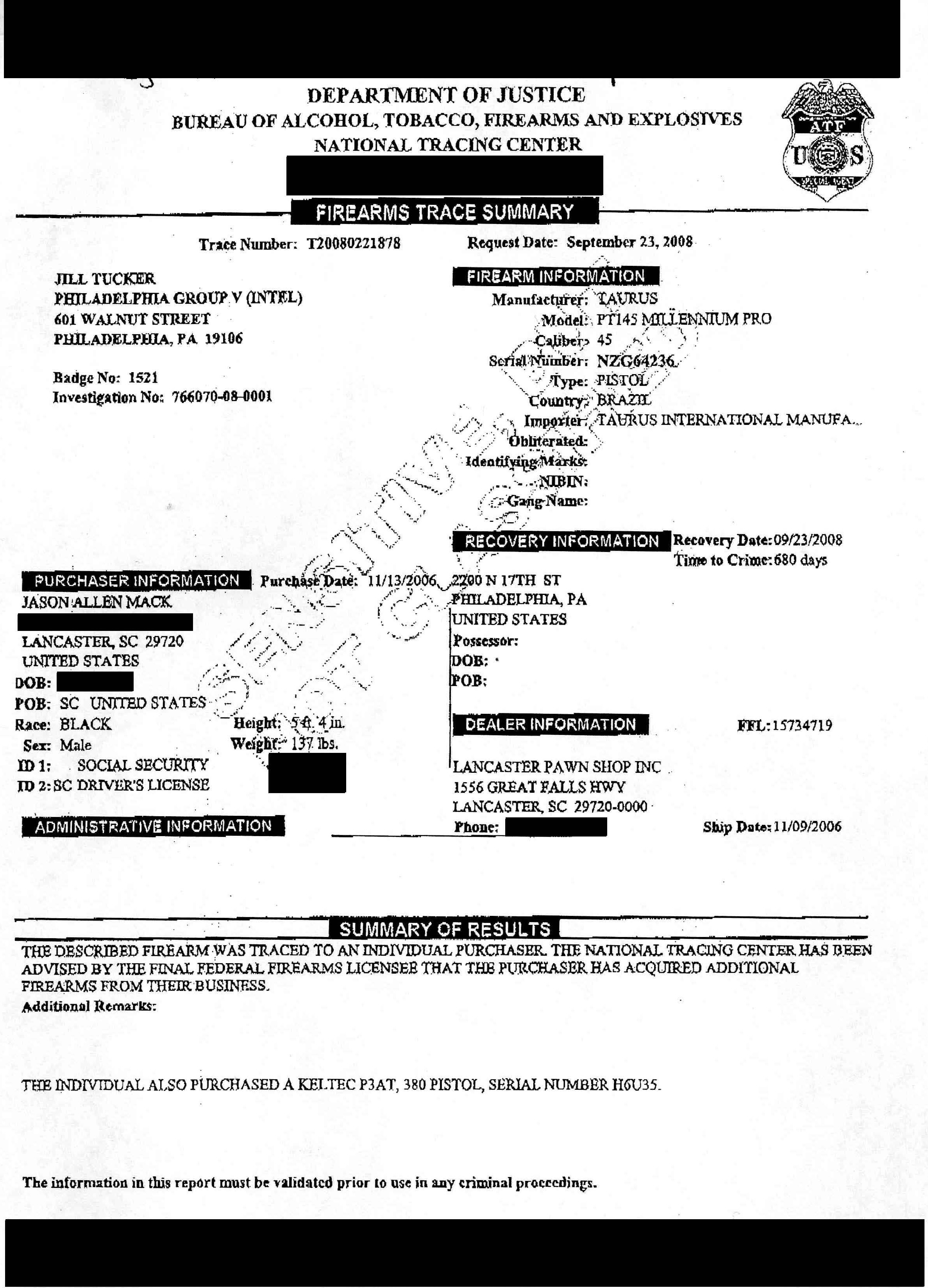
eTrace Report page 1

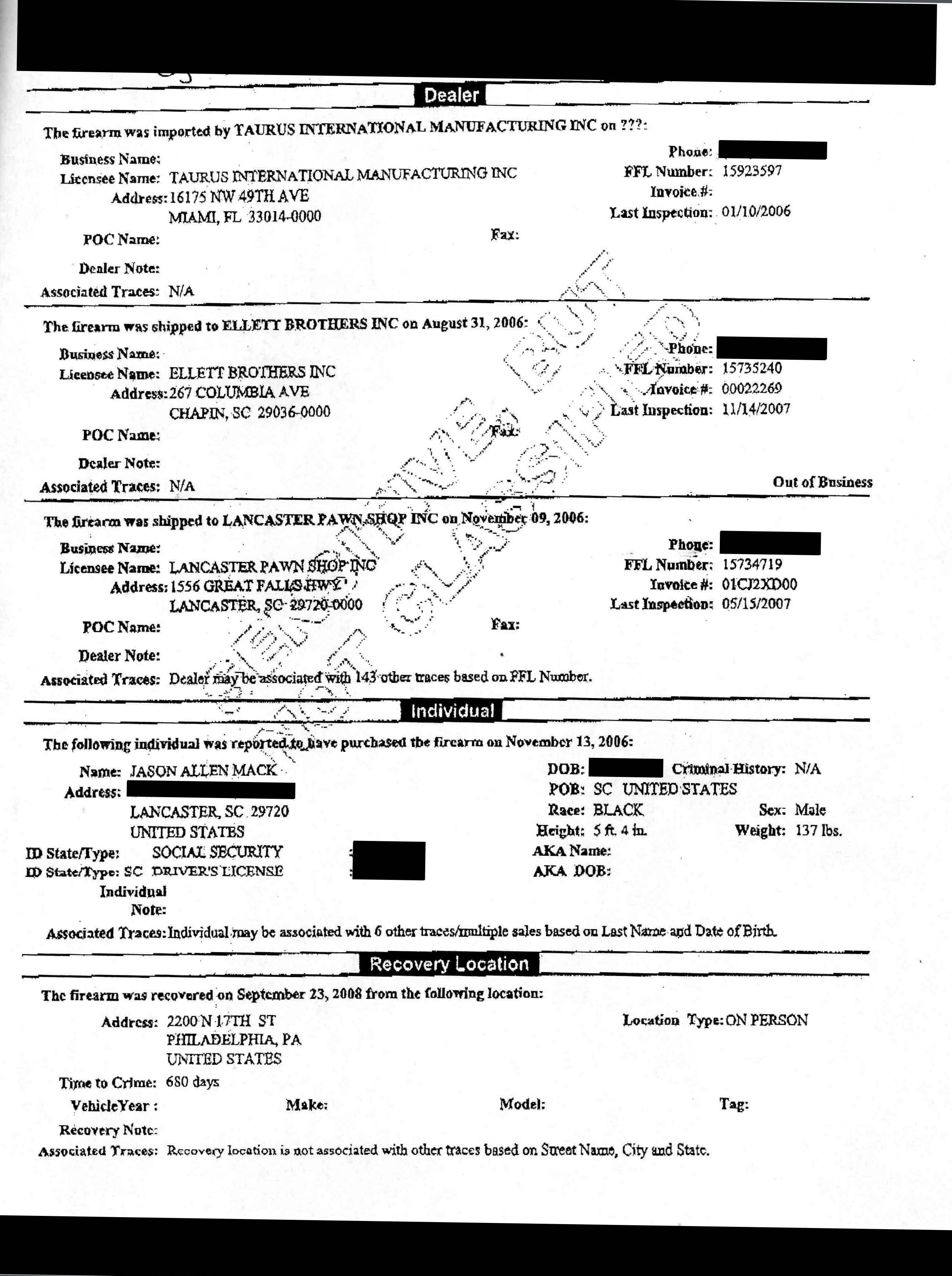
eTrace Report page 2

eTrace is an Internet-based firearm trace request submission system, developed by the United States' federal government, Bureau of Alcohol, Tobacco, Firearms and Explosives, that provides for the electronic exchange of traced firearm data in a secure internet-based environment. Participating law enforcement agencies (domestic and foreign) with access to the internet can acquire 24/7 real-time capabilities to electronically submit firearm trace requests, monitor the progress of traces, retrieve completed trace results, and to query firearm trace related data in Bureau of Alcohol, Tobacco, Firearms and Explosives (ATF) firearms registration database at the National Tracing Center. Firearms tracing is the systematic tracking of the movement of a firearm from its creation by the manufacturer or its introduction into U.S. commerce by the importer, through the distribution chain to the first retail purchase. Release 4.0, a bilingual version (English and Spanish) of eTrace was deployed in December, 2009 for the benefit of Spanish-speaking countries.

== Features ==
Through eTrace, registered users have the capability to initiate a search for traces in various ways. For example, users can search by a firearm's serial number, individual name, type of crime, date of recovery, and numerous other identifiers. Registered users can also generate various statistical reports regarding the number of traces submitted over time, the top firearms traced, the average time-to-crime rates, and more. This will allow any law enforcement agency to develop investigative strategies to reduce firearms-related crime and violence.

The ATF's National Tracing Center assists Federal, State, local and foreign law enforcement agencies by tracing the origin of U.S. source firearms (only to the first retail purchaser) that have been recovered in police activities. Law enforcement can trace a firearm to develop investigative leads that may link a suspect to a firearm in a criminal investigation; identify potential traffickers; and detect in-state, interstate and international patterns in the sources and kinds of crime guns.

eTrace includes the ability to interactively develop investigative leads relative to trace requests; a significant decrease in the turnaround time required to process a trace request; improved data quality of trace related information by providing real time data validation; the ability to monitor the status of traces in a real-time environment; the ability to view/print/download completed trace results; and the ability to generate various statistical reports and perform on-line analytical research relative to a jurisdiction. There are over 35 foreign countries now participating in the eTrace program as well as thousands of police agencies throughout the United States. Each participating law enforcement agency must sign a Memorandum of Understanding (MOU) with ATF and designate each authorized user by name.

== Basics of ATF tracing ==
ATF's tracing system can only trace guns made in the United States or legitimately imported into the United States by a licensed importer in recent years. Guns imported prior to 1968 are extremely difficult or impossible to trace. All war trophy firearms brought back by returning veterans are impossible to trace. However, if such a gun was sold in recent years through a dealer who went out of business, it might be traced.

The basis for ATF to trace a firearm is Make, Model and Serial Number.

- Serial Numbers: Serial numbers on guns are not sacrosanct. Recording of serial numbers by ATF, police or dealers is subject to human error, as it is easy to misread a serial (for example: confusing the number 0 with the letter O, 2 with Z, or 5 with S), omit a digit or two, or transpose a couple of numbers. These and similar errors when entering a serial into the tracing system result in false traces. Certain categories of firearms will provide false results because of multiple duplicate serial numbers (German Luger pistols, P.38 pistols, K.98 rifles, for example). To further complicate the issue, it is relatively simple to add letters or numbers to a firearm serial (an illegal act) which will cause the trace to fail or produce a false trace. It is also simple to exchange parts on multiple guns such that (on certain pistols) the frame has one serial, the slide has another number and the barrel yet another number. According to the ATF National Tracing Center data, an invalid serial number was the most common reason for unsuccessful traces from Mexico, but the report doesn't clarify how a serial number can be "invalid".
- Make: In a recent report, ATF has acknowledged that counterfeit firearms play an increasingly important role in the Mexican Cartels. Such counterfeit firearms could be completely unmarked or fraudulently marked with a manufacturer's name.
- Model: Many firearms are not marked with a model designation, and many models look identical. The configuration of a firearm can sometimes be easily changed by exchanging parts to conform to a completely different model, or a completely different manufacturer.

In 1998/1999, ATF repeatedly published the following disclaimer, "ATF emphasizes that the appearance of a Federal firearms licensee (FFL) or a first unlicensed purchaser of record in association with a crime gun [i.e. traced gun] or in association with multiple crime guns [i.e. traced guns] in no way suggests that either the FFL or the first purchaser has committed criminal acts." In 2002, ATF reported, "A crime gun trace alone does not mean that an FFL or firearm purchaser has committed an unlawful act." These statements have now disappeared from more recent ATF publications and reflects a shift in the official ATF position - such that ATF now considers individuals and dealers associated with multiple traces more likely to have committed criminal acts. Despite that many (if not most) traces are not directly connected to crime, a 2010 ATF eTrace PowerPoint Presentation to a United Nations Firearms Workshop publicly stated, "When you find several traces associated with multiple sales, you may have identified a straw purchaser", and "Identify FFL’s [dealers] in your Area Who May Cater to Criminals. By utilizing the Top Source Dealer report, you can potentially identify FFL’s who are known as a " criminal friendly FFL."

== ATF firearms databases ==
The ATF Firearms Tracing System (FTS) contains firearm tracing information from millions of traces performed since 1989, and consists of several databases:

1. Multiple Sale Reports. Over 460,000 (2003) Multiple Sales reports (ATF F 3310.4 - a registration record with specific firearms and owner name and address - increasing by about 140,000 per year). Reported as 4.2 million records in 2010.

2. Suspect Guns. All guns "suspected" of being used for criminal purposes but not recovered by law enforcement. This database includes (ATF's own examples), individuals purchasing large quantities of firearms (including collectors of older firearms rarely used in crime), and dealers with "improper" record keeping. May include guns “observed” by law enforcement in an estate, or at a gun show, or elsewhere. Reported as 34,807 in 2010.
3. Traced Guns. Over 1.2 million (2002) detail results from all traces. ATF reported 343,746 guns were traced in 2009, and a total of 4 million traces since inception. This is a registration record which includes Names and Addresses of the first retail seller and purchaser.

4. Out of Business Records. Data is manually collected from paper Out-of-Business records (or input from computer records) and entered into the trace system by ATF. These are registration records, indexed by serial number, which include name and address, make, model, serial and caliber of the firearm(s), as well as data from the 4473 form - in digital or image format. In March, 2010, ATF reported receiving several hundred million records since 1968.

5. Theft Guns. Firearms reported as stolen to ATF. Contained 330,000 records in 2010. Contains only thefts from licensed dealers and interstate carriers (optional). Does not have an interface to the FBI's National Crime Information Center (NCIC) theft data base, where the majority of stolen, lost and missing firearms are reported.

== Firearm data sources ==
For newer firearms not yet entered into the tracing system, ATF contacts the manufacturer or importer, wholesaler, and individual dealer to determine the identity of the first retail purchaser.

The Firearm Tracing System provides manual & automated data retrieval from:

1. All previous firearms traces from all sources,
2. Dealer, Importer, and Manufacturer computer, paper or microfilm “Bound Book” Out-of-Business records (including digital files required by ATF Ruling 2008–2),
3. Dealer “Bound Book” records (computer and/or paper) copied or photographed by ATF during annual inspections.
4. ATF Form 4473 from dealers copied or photographed during annual inspections and in Out-of-Business records.
5. Multiple Firearm Sales reports (ATF F 3310.4)
6. Traditional phone calls to the manufacturer, distributor and final selling dealer,
7. Additional data sources, such as some state firearms sales records as required by state law or policy.
8. Dealer “Bound Books” over 20 years old voluntarily sent in to ATF.
9. Includes some antique firearms allowed to be entered in “Bound Books”.
10. Stolen firearms reported to ATF. (Note: Does not include stolen firearms reported to the FBI - NCIC, a separate system)
11. System 2000 automated retrieval system from manufacturers, importers and distributors (100 companies as of 2010)
12. Certain firearms dealers are required by ATF to report certain used firearms transaction to ATF for entry into the Firearms Tracing System.
13. For every firearm reported stolen to the NCIC stolen firearms database, New Jersey now automatically submits a trace to ATF (NJ Trace System). ATF is reported as working on a similar program.
14. Some state firearm registration systems are being loaded into the tracing system.
15. In a press release, New Jersey admits tracing (from police records) all of private gun purchases into the ATF Firearms Tracing System through eTrace. By state law, New York and Connecticut also require tracing of all such private purchase firearms.
16. ATF hired private consultants to catalog information on firearms and submit trace requests from police departments to ATF.
17. ATF has imposed a requirement (pilot project) to report all dealer multiple sales (2 or more) of all semi-auto rifles with a detachable magazine greater than .22 caliber. (Currently restricted to California, Arizona, New Mexico and Texas - border states with Mexico). Reported justification is to identify "straw purchasers" and weapons traffickers. However, this ruling will include 100-year-old Model 1907 Winchester rifles, WWII M1 Carbines, German G43 rifles, FN 49 rifles, and many other historic firearms of primary interest to collectors and are not known to be used by Mexican drug catels. William J. Hoover (ATF Acting Deputy Director) denied that ATF is seeking to create a national registry (a national registry already exists, see above), and said records would be kept for 24 months and then destroyed if not acted on by investigators. However, this is contrary to current ATF practice and neither assertion is supported by the documentation.

== Firearms tracing reports ==
=== Criticism of eTrace statistics ===
As far back as 1992, and as recently as 2009, the Congressional Research Service has warned about the use of statistics from ATF's tracing system. "The ATF tracing system is an operational system designed to help law enforcement agencies identify the ownership path of individual firearms. It was not designed to collect statistics."

According to the Congressional Research Service, the information from firearms searches is limited and may be biased by several factors:

• traced firearms are generally recovered by law enforcement, and they may not be representative of firearms possessed and used by criminals;
• there remains significant variation over time and from jurisdiction to jurisdiction as to "when, why, and how" a firearm is recovered and selected to be traced; and
• a substantial percentage of recovered firearms cannot be successfully traced for several reasons."

On June 9, 2009, the Department of Homeland Security criticized ATF's tracing system, observing that it has numerous problems with data collection and sample populations which render some of ATF's statistics as unreliable. DHS actually contributed to the problems with the data errors and ATF's statistics problems by entering incomplete trace data from open sources and not entering the complete information on the firearm (make, model, caliber, manufacturer, importer if any). On many occasions, either ATF or CENAPI would go in and try to enter the full and correct data on a firearm only to find that DHS had already started an entry in ETrace causing problems. 'Most trace requests that are submitted to ATF from Mexico are considered “unsuccessful” because of missing or improperly entered gun data'.

Nevertheless, ATF has continued to generate and quote misleading eTrace statistics, particularly regarding seized Mexican guns.

=== Firearms trace summary report ===
Individual trace results can be printed directly from eTrace and summarizes the firearm's trace pedigree to the first purchaser. The Firearms Trace Summary shows the full firearm description, requesting agency information, and possessor and recovery location (if provided by the requestor). If the firearm is traced successfully, the name of the [first] purchaser, the identification used, physical description, place of purchase, and a calculation of the time period between the retail sale and the criminal recovery (time-to-crime) is also given.

What Trace Results Look Like:

In addition to seeing the most recent trace results on the home page, users can select views of any or all of their trace results by going to the Search for Trace Results screen.

eTrace's analytical tool allows the user to perform both quick searches or detailed, multilayered searches from trace data. For example, a typical search can be for all persons with the same last name or who used identical identification when purchasing firearms. A multilayered search might involve purchasers of a specific caliber of firearm who show a place of birth in a specific foreign country.

eTrace's referral list identifies other departments and agencies with information in common and provides the contact information for their linked traces. A referral list is included in every trace result. Specifically, if a department's firearms trace has a purchaser and/or possessor who match by date of birth and name, or a firearms licensee, and/or a recovery location in common, the list will display the name and contact information for the other department or agency. This resource can make departments with common points able to work together if warranted.

=== Firearms trace summary report detail ===
(See above report image)

This report contains no disclaimer that the report identifies only the first purchaser, who may have no connection to the person found in possession of the firearm, nor any indication of presumed innocence of the purchaser nor the selling dealer. This report is provided to Mexican police (see Mexican Police Corruption below) from the bilingual eTrace program provided to Mexico.

- Firearm Information: Manufacturer, Model, Caliber, Serial Number, Type (Pistol, Rifle, etc.), Country of manufacture & Importer.
- Recovery Information: Recovery date, "Time to Crime" (age of firearm), Recovery address.
- Purchaser Information: (First purchaser only). Purchase Date, Full Name and Full Address, Date of Birth, Place of Birth, Race, Sex, Social Security Number, Drivers License Number, Height, Weight.
- Dealer Information: FFL Number, Name and Full Address, Phone Number, Ship Date (Date of Receipt).
- Summary of Results: Narrative by ATF of the trace results.
- Additional Dealer Information: Full transfer path from Importer or Manufacturer, to Distributor, to Dealer. Includes Full Name and Full Address of each, Point of Contact Name, Dealer Notes, Associated Traces (All other traces connected to dealer), Phone Number, Fax Number, FFL Number, Invoice Number (if any), Date of Last ATF Inspection
- Additional Individual Information: All information from 'Purchaser' above, plus: Criminal History, AKA (Alias) Name, AKA Date of Birth, Associated Traces (All other traces or multiple gun purchases for that last name and Date of Birth).
- Recovery Location: All the information in 'Recovery' above, plus Type of Recovery (On Person, etc.), detail Vehicle Information (including license number), all other traces for that Street Name, City and State.

== Limitations ==
eTrace only tracks firearms to the "first retail purchase". Many (if not most) such guns have been subsequently sold or stolen - perhaps many times. Nevertheless, eTrace only points to the first purchaser, who is then automatically reported to the requesting agency, including foreign police. eTrace does not and cannot (at the present time) trace firearm ownership to the last owner, nor to any intermediate owners, which is a major limitation in the eTrace system.

All traced guns are called "crime guns" by ATF, regardless of involvement in a crime. ATF has defined "crime gun" to mean "any firearm that is illegally possessed, used in a crime, or suspected to have been used in a crime." An abandoned firearm may also be categorized as a crime gun if it is suspected it was used in a crime or illegally possessed." Since any firearm "might" have been involved in a crime, ATF considers any and all firearms to be a "crime gun" or a "suspect gun" and any trace to be a "bona fide law enforcement investigation". Regardless of disposition or current ownership, ATF sometimes trace, track, or enter as a "suspect gun", every firearm entered in a dealer's records to see if any will link to a crime in the past, or might be connected to a crime in the future.

ATF's position is that gun tracing is voluntary for other law enforcement jurisdictions, but urges law enforcement to trace every firearm under the "bona fide law enforcement investigation" rationale. Some agencies or jurisdictions trace all recovered guns as a matter of state or local policy or law, while others trace all guns reported as sold within the jurisdiction as required by law or policy, and other agencies trace only when needed for specific investigations. Some jurisdiction do not trace.

== Implementation ==
ATF publicized global eTrace access in United Nations Disarmament Marking and Tracing Workshops held in Nairobi, Kenya in December, 2007, Lomé, Togo in April, 2008, Rio de Janeiro in June, 2008, and other locations. ATF reports over 2,000 agencies around the world and over 10,000 individuals have access to first purchaser American gun owner personal information. Tracing data is of no value without identifying the individual purchaser (name & address), so ATF specifically provides "a description of the original retail purchaser" to the requestor. In GAO Report 09-709, ATF reports the National Tracing Center, “conducts the gun traces, and returns information on their findings to the submitting party”.

The U.S. Tiahrt Amendment and the 2008 Appropriations Bill specifically (financially) prohibits ATF from disclosing certain personal information from the Firearms Tracing System and retrieving information by name. However, foreign governments and agencies are under no such restriction. There is a legal restriction in the Memorandum of Understanding to prevent disclosure of names and addresses, but it is difficult to detect and enforce.

Colombia and Mexico were provided with their own in-country tracing centers with full access to ATF firearm registration records. In Colombia, a joint ATF-CNP Center for Anti-Explosives Information and Firearms Tracing (CIARA) opened on December 6, 2006. In Mexico, The National Center for Information, Analysis and Planning in order to Fight Crime (CENAPI) was established in 2003. ATF states these are models for planned future tracing centers throughout Central and South America and the Caribbean Basin. This raises major privacy issues for first purchaser American gun purchasers because the data includes: Name, address, date of birth, place of birth, height, weight, sex, driver's license information, and vehicle information. Social Security Number is frequently included in ATF Form 4473, and may be accessed during a trace.

Some 17,000 individuals have formal access to eTrace. Police agencies in 48 foreign countries have been provided with eTrace software and are given access to first purchaser American gun owner names, addresses drivers license and Social Security numbers. These countries include:

Albania, Anguilla, Antigua, Aruba, Australia, the Commonwealth of the Bahamas, Barbados, Belgium, Belize, Bermuda, British Virgin Islands, Canada, Cayman Islands, Colombia, Costa Rica, Curacao, Czech Republic, Dominica, Dominican Republic, El Salvador, Finland, Germany, Grenada, Guatemala, Guyana, Honduras, Jamaica, Japan, Kosovo, Mexico, Montserrat, Nicaragua, Panama, Slovakia, Spain, St. Kitts and Nevis, St. Lucia, St. Vincent and the Grenadines, Suriname, Trinidad and Tobago, and the United Kingdom.

Of these, many have police corruption issues or known anti-firearms bias. ATF plans to add more countries in the near future.

A Spanish-language version of the eTrace System was deployed in 2009 to Mexico, Guatemala and Costa Rica. All three countries have widespread police corruption issues. ATF declared a specific goal to provide eTrace software to all 31 states within Mexico.

== Tracing seized Mexican guns ==
Project Gunrunner is part of ATF's effort to collaborate with the Mexican authorities and its "cornerstone" has been the expansion of eTrace.

Since 1992 (and as recently as 2009), the Congressional Research Service has repeatedly stated that the ATF tracing system is an operational system designed to help law enforcement agencies identify the ownership path of individual firearms and was not designed to collect statistics. Nevertheless:

- In February 2008, William Hoover, assistant director for Field Operations of ATF testified before Congress that over 90% of the firearms that have either been recovered in, or interdicted in transport to Mexico, originated from various sources within the United States.
- In May, 2008, William Newell, Special Agent in Charge of the ATF Phoenix Office reported: "When 90 percent-plus of the firearms recovered from these violent drug cartels are from a U.S. source, we have a responsibility to do everything we can to stem the illegal flow of these firearms to these thugs."
- On 17 March 2009, Senator Dick Durbin stated in a Congressional Hearing, "According to ATF [the Bureau of Alcohol, Tobacco, Firearms and Explosives], more than 90 percent of the guns seized after raids or shootings in Mexico have been traced right here to the United States of America." Senator Feinstein added: "It is unacceptable to have 90 percent of the guns that are picked up in Mexico used to shoot judges, police officers, mayors, kidnap innocent people and do terrible things come from the United States....."
- On 25 March 2009, while in Mexico City, Secretary of State Hillary Clinton recorded an interview with Lara Logan, saying, "the guns that are used by the drug cartels against the police and the military, 90 percent of them come from America."
- On April 2, 2009, Fox News published "The Myth of 90 Percent: Only a Small Fraction of Guns in Mexico Come From U.S.".
- In April, 2009, President Barack Obama was in Mexico City and at a joint press conference with Mexican President Felipe Calderon, and repeated the same statement (just discredited by Fox News): "More than 90 percent of the guns recovered in Mexico come from the United States....”
- On June 19, 2009, The U.S. Government Accountability Office reported to Congress "Using ATF’s eTrace data......Over 90 percent of the firearms seized in Mexico and traced over the last 3 years have come from the United States."
- On July 16, 2009, William McMahon, Deputy Assistant Director for Field Operations, ATF, testified before Congress that about 90 percent of the guns recovered in Mexico that ATF has traced were initially sold in the United States. (Committee on Homeland Security Subcommittee on Border, Maritime, and Global Counterterrorism, U.S. House of Representatives, concerning “Combating Border Violence: The Role of Interagency Coordination in Investigations”).
- in September 2010, the U.S. Department of Justice (DOJ) Office of the Inspector General (OIG) issued a draft report critical of Project Gunrunner, followed by the final version in November, 2010. The OIG analysis of ATF data shows, of the guns submitted for tracing, a much lower percentage of guns traced to the United States, ranging from 44 percent in FY 2005, falling to 27 percent in FY 2007 and 31 percent in FY 2009. These percentages significantly differ from those in ATF testimony before Congress (see above).
- Between September and November 2010, ATF admitted that “the 90% figure cited to Congress could be misleading" because it applied only to the small portion of Mexican crime guns that are traced.” During this 2010 review by the OIG, ATF could not provide updated information on the percentage of traced Mexican crime guns that originated in or imported through the United States.
- In October 2010, ATF announced they would no longer release estimates of how many guns came from the United States because the numbers have become "too politicized". ATF stated, "It doesn't matter if 20 percent are coming from the U.S. or 80 percent...".
- On December 14, 2010, despite ATF's announcement they would no longer release estimates, NBC reported "U.S. firearms agents estimate that around 80 percent of the weapons used by Mexican drug traffickers come from the United States...", a percentage previously disavowed by ATF and discredited by the DOJ OIG in November 2010 (see above).
- On February 10, 2011, Stratfor Global Intelligence published an analysis which concluded "almost 90 percent of the guns seized in Mexico in 2008 were not traced back to the United States."
- On June 10, 2011, The Wall Street Journal reported new ATF statistics provided by ATF Acting Director Kenneth E. Melson to Sen. Dianne Feinstein (D., Calif.), that 70% of the firearms recovered in Mexico and submitted for ATF tracing, passed through the U.S. at some point. The statistics do not show how many were legitimate export sales to Mexico and other countries; a serious discrepancy. The findings come as ATF defends itself in congressional hearings for ATF Project Gunrunner, which lawmakers say permitted, encouraged and facilitated trafficking thousands of firearms to Mexican drug cartels.

The OIG analysis of ATF data concluded that ATF's attempts to expand gun tracing in Mexico have been unsuccessful. Increasingly, ATF finds that Mexican cartels transport firearms and munitions into Mexico from Guatemala, situated on Mexico's southern border.

Although the number of trace requests from Mexico has increased since FY 2006, most seized guns in Mexico are not traced. Moreover, most trace requests from Mexico do not succeed in identifying the gun dealer who originally sold the gun, and the rate of successful traces has declined since the start of Project Gunrunner. Most Mexican crime gun trace requests that were successful were untimely and of limited use for generating investigative leads. The average age of traced Mexican guns is 14 years, and over 75 percent of traced Mexican guns were over five years old and the information considered useless for law enforcement purposes. Senior Mexican law enforcement authorities interviewed by U.S. OIG officers do not view gun tracing as an important investigative tool because it implicates only the innocent and legitimate parties in the gun production and distribution network, due to limitations in the information tracing typically provides. Mexican law enforcement has no jurisdiction in the United States.

ATF fails to address misleading factors in statistics of seized Mexican guns. For example, ATF fails to separately identify:

1. American origin guns legitimately sold to the Mexican military.
2. American origin guns legitimately and commercially exported to the Mexican gun shop in Mexico City.
3. American origin guns legitimately sold to Mexican police - at the Federal, state or local level.
4. American origin guns legitimately sold to Mexican banks, private security firms, or other companies.
5. American origin guns legitimately sold to other Mexican government entities.
6. American origin guns legitimately sold to police, military, security companies or private parties in other countries, which have been smuggled into Mexico.
7. American origin guns exported to Mexico many years ago. (The average age of traced guns from Mexico is over 14 years).
8. Foreign guns with American markings which were never imported into the United States for any number of reasons.
9. Counterfeit guns made elsewhere with fake American markings. ATF has acknowledged this is a problem.
10. Frequently, pictures of seized Mexican guns show many .22 rimfire rabbit rifles and sporting shotguns. Are these included in ATF statistics? ATF doesn't say.

If ATF or Mexican police do not collect tracing information quickly, it becomes unavailable. In accordance with Mexican law, all guns seized by the Mexican government must be surrendered to the Mexican Army within 48 hours. After the Mexican military obtains custody of the guns, ATF or Mexican federal police is unlikely to gain timely access to them to gather the information needed to initiate traces. Mexican Army officials interviewed by OIG personnel said their role is to safeguard the weapons and that they have no specific authority to assist in trafficking investigations. To gain access to the weapons, ATF officials must make a formal request to the Attorney General of Mexico for each gun, citing a specific reason that access is needed, demonstrating that the requested information is related to a Mexican criminal investigation, and providing a description of the gun with the serial number. However, if ATF had the gun description and serial number, ATF officials would not need to request access to the gun. Due to these barriers, ATF and wider department efforts to gain access to weapons in Mexican military custody have not been successful. The majority of seized Mexican crime guns are not traced. The report states that the poor quality of the tracing data and the resulting high rate of unsuccessful traces suggest that the training is insufficient, training has been provided to the wrong people, or there are other unidentified problems with Mexican law enforcement's crime gun tracing.

The final OIG report, which was released in November 2010, concludes that because ATF has not been able to communicate the value of gun tracing to Mexican law enforcement officials, Mexican police are less likely to prioritize their efforts to obtain tracing information from seized crime guns and enter it into eTrace. This hinders ATF's plans to deploy Spanish eTrace throughout Mexico. Because the expansion of tracing in Mexico is the cornerstone of Project Gunrunner, this presents a significant barrier to full implementation of ATF's Gunrunner strategy. The OIG report also revealed ATF has been unable to respond to many training and support requests from Mexican government agencies, and ATF's backlog of requests for information from Mexican authorities has hindered coordination between ATF and Mexican law enforcement. In addition, it was found that ATF has not staffed or structured its Mexico Country Office to fully implement Project Gunrunner's missions in Mexico.

In 2009, Mexico reported they held 305,424 confiscated firearms.

Regardless of innocence, first purchaser American gun owner names and addresses, detailed personal information from gun purchases (from form 4473 - including date of birth, possibly Social Security Number), and detail on other guns purchased by owner name is directly available to some 35 foreign governments, including governments with known corruption issues. Over 360,000 trace requests were processed in fiscal year 2014. Trace requests have been accepted by ATF from over 60 foreign governments (some with terrorist connections). ATF admits the identity of the firearms purchaser provided to a foreign law enforcement agency is of particular concern to people, because the purchaser is not necessarily involved in any crime. However, ATF claims it has no record of an American being at risk in a foreign country as a result of innocent involvement in the history of a firearm subsequently recovered and traced by a law enforcement agency, although ATF does not mention how they would know if an American was at risk. According to the U.S. State Department, Americans have become victims of harassment, mistreatment and extortion by Mexican law enforcement and other officials. In Mexico (as in many other countries), anyone accused of a crime is "guilty until proven innocent", and cash bail may be the only option to avoid incarceration.

ATF Project Gunrunner has a stated official objective to stop the sale and export of guns from the United States into Mexico in order to deny Mexican drug cartels the firearms considered "tools of the trade". However, under Project Gunrunner, Operations "Fast and Furious", "Too Hot to Handle" and others, are alleged to have done the opposite by ATF permitting and facilitating 'straw purchase' firearm sales to traffickers, and allowing the guns to 'walk' and be transported to Mexico. This has resulted in considerable controversy.

When U.S. Border Patrol Agent Brian Terry was murdered 14 December 2010, suspicions centered on "Fast and Furious" weapons. The break in the case can be traced to a 22 December 2010 posting on the Forums (Message Board) of the CleanUpATF web site by "1desertrat", who stated "One of these ["Fast and Furious"] rifles is rumored to have been linked to the recent killing of a Border Patrol Officer in Nogales, AZ."

=== Chronicle and development of Project Gunwalker ===
In response to pressures by Mike Vanderboegh, ATF Special Agents Vince A. Cefalu and Jay Dobyns, among others, Senator Charles E. Grassley (IA) initiated an investigation with a letter to ATF on 27 January 2011, and again on 31 January 2011. ATF responded through the Department of Justice by denying all allegations. Senator Grassley responded with specific documentation supporting the allegations in letters to U.S. Attorney General Holder on 9 Feb 2011 and 16 Feb 2011. ATF refused to answer specific questions in a formal briefing to Senator Grassley on 10 Feb 2011.

Indictments filed in federal court, documentation obtained by Senator Grassley, and statements of ATF agents obtained by Senator Grassley and CBS News, show that the ATF Phoenix Field Division allegedly allowed and facilitated the sale of over 2,500 firearms (AK-47 rifles, FN 5.7mm pistols, AK-47 pistols, and .50 caliber rifles) in 'straw man purchases' likely destined for Mexico. According to ATF agents, Mexican officials were not notified, and ATF agents operating in Mexico were instructed not to alert Mexican authorities about the operation. Some ATF agents and supervisors strongly objected, and gun dealers (who were cooperating with ATF) protested the sales, but were asked by ATF to complete the transactions, purportedly to expose the supply chain and gather intelligence. Many of these same guns are being recovered from crime scenes in Arizona and throughout Mexico, which is artificially inflating ATF's eTrace statistics of U.S. origin guns seized in Mexico. One specific gun, an SKS rifle recovered at the scene, is alleged to be the weapon used to murder Customs and Border Protection Agent Brian Terry on 14 December 2010.

== Mexican police corruption ==
The Mexican Army recently (see citations) disarmed corrupt Mexican police in the cities of Tijuana, Cancun, Rosarito, Nuevo Laredo, Reynosa and Matamoros - and arrested a number of police commanders in Mexico City. Yet, according to the U.S. Government Accountability Office (GAO), during FY 2007 and 2008, ATF conducted twelve eTrace training sessions for Mexican police (over 961 Mexican police officers) in several Mexican cities, including the same cities where corrupt police were disarmed and arrested: Mexico City, Tijuana, Nuevo Laredo, and Matamoros. Despite the GAO report, ATF said in October 2010 that only about 20 people have been trained to use eTrace in Mexico.

According to Mexican and U.S. government officials, extensive corruption at the federal, state, and local levels of Mexican law enforcement impedes U.S. efforts to develop effective and dependable partnerships with Mexican government entities in combating arms trafficking. Mexican federal authorities are implementing anticorruption measures, but government officials acknowledge fully implementing these reforms will take considerable time, and may take years to affect comprehensive change. According to Mexican government officials, corruption pervades all levels of Mexican law enforcement — federal, state and local.

Almost half of Mexican police officers examined during 2008 failed background and security tests, a figure that rises to nearly 9 of 10 police agents in the border state of Baja California. “An alleged trafficker in the X Caliber case, Fidel Hernandez, told investigators at the Bureau of Alcohol, Tobacco, Firearms and Explosives [ATF] that he was “selling the guns to people who were ‘cops’ in Mexico.” According to ATF’s report, “At this location, approximately one mile inside Mexico, Hernandez would meet with the Mexican police officers, who were in uniform. Hernandez said the officers would pay him for the guns, which he had inside the bags.”"

== See also ==
- Bureau of Alcohol, Tobacco, Firearms and Explosives (ATF)
- Project Gunrunner
- National Tracing Center
- Mexico Drug War
- Firearm Owners Protection Act
- Gun politics in Mexico
