= Naval operations of the Mexican drug war =

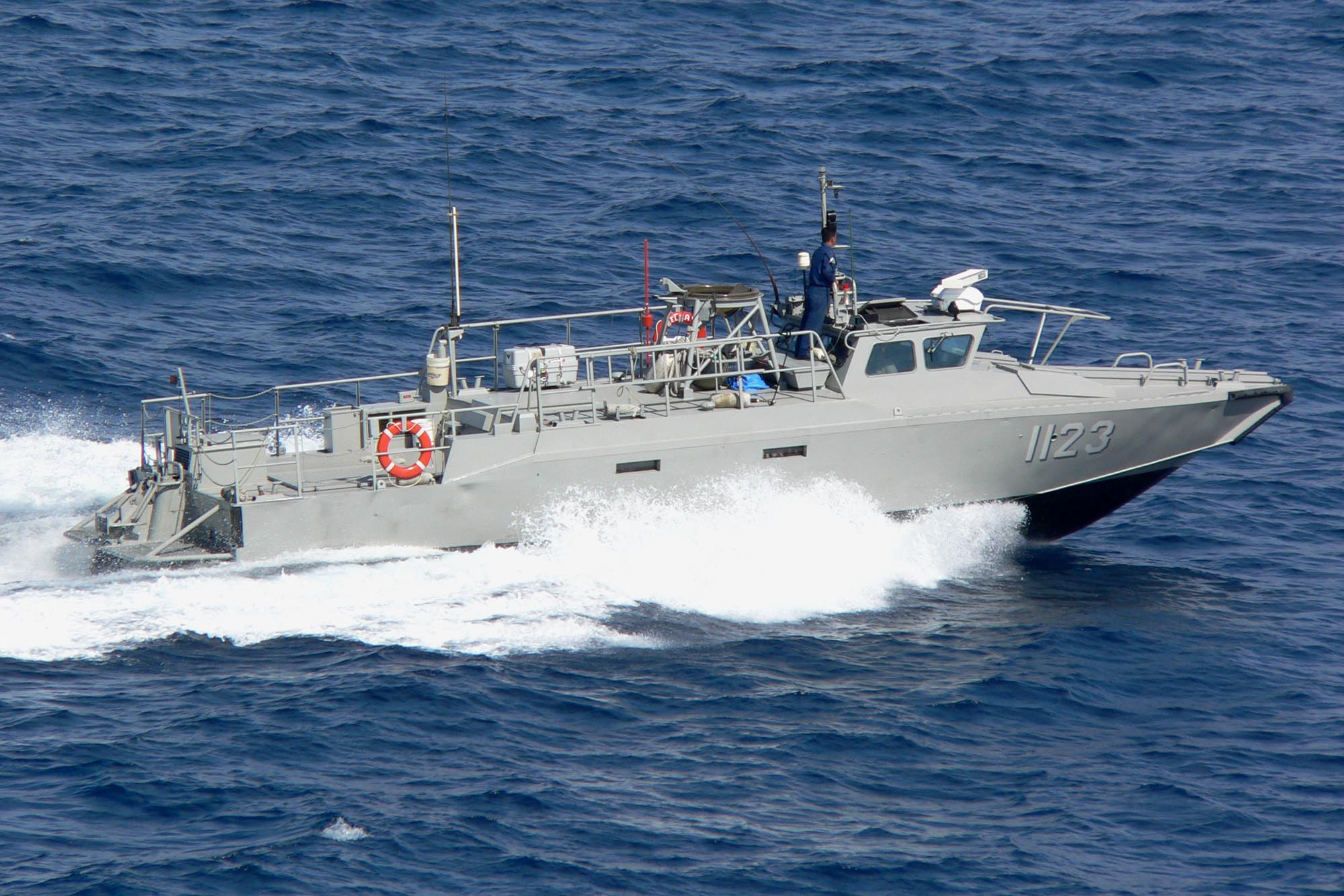
Mexican Navy patrol boat of Cabo San Lucas in 2005.

Timeline of Mexican Naval anti-drug cartel operations during the Mexican drug war:

== 2009 ==
- January 18 - During a Naval aerial patrol 52 nautical miles (96 km) southeast of Santa Rosalía, Baja California Sur, a navy helicopter intercepted a suspicious motorized boat. It was later secured on land by marines on board a Coastal patrol ship. Naval personnel seized 89 packages of marijuana that had a total weight of close to a ton.
- January 20 - During an intense operation, several naval patrol ships and a pair of helicopters were sent to capture 63 packages of marijuana that were spotted floating 32 nautical miles (59 km) southeast of Loreto, Baja California Sur during a naval air patrol. After a 30-hour period, Marines on board the patrol ships successfully seized 63 packages of marijuana that sum up to 850 kilograms.
- January 22 - Due to a Joint Operation between the Mexican Navy, Mexican Army, and SIEDO, 60 boxes of pseudoephedrine were seized on board the container ship "Monte Verde" (Mount Green) in Manzanillo, Colima. The ship was said to be bearing the Antigua and Barbuda flag and was registered from Busan, South Korea.
- January 31 - In Acapulco, Guerrero, during a raid on a household, marines arrested six drug suspects and found 600 grams of cocaine, one 9mm pistol, chemicals and equipment for the making of cocaine.
- February 3 - Due to an anonymous tip, Naval personnel raided a household that was suspect of selling narcotics in San Patricio, Jalisco. Hundreds of baggies of cocaine were seized along, with a 28-year-old drug dealer. On the same day in Guacamayas, Michoacán, Naval personnel arrested two suspects who are accused of participating in an attack on Municipal police officers. Inside the home of the suspects several magazines, ammunition, grenades and an AR-15 were also seized.
- October 3 - The Mexican government ordered 300 Marines and Federal Police forces as "immediate response" to Tijuana, BC. the move comes after a serious number of attacks on Municipal Police officers.

== 2010 ==
Note: From February 8 to 18 Mexican Naval operations and events are listed below:

- February 8 - In Reynosa, during a routine patrol, Marines received gunfire from gunmen inside various vehicles. Marines repelled the attack and captured 3 of the gunmen, 14 trucks, various assault rifles, ammunition, and 26 packages of marijuana. During the firefight, 3 marines were killed and 8 were injured, while 3 gunmen were also killed.
- February 11 - Matamoros, Tamaulipas, two individuals name Adolfo Vázquez Ortiz and José Alberto Ramírez Gaitán were arrested. The two men have been accused of being linked with organized crime and having a connection with a criminal group that was involved in the attack of marines on February 8 in Reynosa. Both men were sent to the federal authorities in Mexico City.
- February 12 - In Méndez, Tamaulipas, Marines raided the ranch of "El Culebreño". Naval personnel discovered and seized: 5 assault rifles, 2 pistols, ammunition, one package of marijuana, and 8 vehicles.
- February 15 - In Reynosa, Tamaulipas. Mexican Marines captured Treviño Cardoza “El Trevi” a known member of Los Zetas along with 6 accomplices. "El Trevi" is known for drug smuggling specifically marijuana. During the course of the operation, marines received gunfire from the suspects and returned fire which led to his capture.
- February 18 - Near Reynosa, PEMEX personnel informed the military that armed men were present in a PEMEX installation. A Naval helicopter was dispatched and spotted three suspicious vehicles, marines disembarked the helicopter and were met with gunfire. Marines repelled the attack and captured 5 vehicles. Inside them were packages of marijuana weighing 4,413 kilos. The gunmen were able to escape.
  - On the same day, due to the success of Air - Sea patrols, and checkpoints in Valle Hermoso, Tamaulipas, four drug traffickers, 4 trucks, 2 assault rifles, 9 rifle magazines and 186 cartridges were seized.

Note: From March 4 Mexican Naval operations are listed below

- March 4 - In Monterrey, Nuevo León. Naval personnel in a joint operation with Federal Police forces raided a home in the center of the city. The raid disrupted illegal activity such as illegal liquor smuggled into the country, 10 workers were arrested and sent to the custody of SIEDO.
  - In the same area of the city, Mario Alberto Garcia Ramirez aka "El Galleto" assumed leader of a group of hitmen that belong to Los Zetas was arrested. Four suspects, two assault rifles, three vehicles were also seized.
- March 4 - In the Colonia of Corrijo del Rey, Nine members of the Beltrán-Leyva Cartel including 4 state police officers who were collaborating with the cartel were arrested. Assault rifles and ammunition were also seized.
- March 25 - 85 kilometers northeast of Monterrey in the municipality of Cerralvo, Nuevo Leon. Naval helicopters intercepted a large convoy made up various trucks and suspects, the convoy were ordered to stop but responded with ground fire. Marines and the suspected convoy clashed leaving 6 gunmen dead with various ammunition and weaponry confiscated. Mexican Army troops were ordered to secure the area.
- March 30 - Marines detained two suspects who belonged to Los Zetas organization, the two detained, Eliodoro Nava Reyna and Gloria Isela Reyna aka The blonde witch have said to have contact with the regional commander Antonio Campos of Los Zetas in Matamoros, Tamaulipas. Along with the detainees close to 500,000 thousand dollars in U.S. currency and two rifles were obtained.
- April 1 - Close to a ton of marijuana were found abandoned in the beaches of Bahía Kino, Sonora. Marines from the 4th Naval region discovered the lone narcotics during a routine patrol. Also discovered were two assault rifles and various ammunition.
- April 6 - In a join operation between the Mexican Navy, The Tax Administration Service (SAT), and Mexican Attorney General, 329 packages of cocaine were discovered on board a container ship in the port city of Manzanillo, Colima.
- April 8 - During a routine patrol in Matamoros, Marines were fired upon by a group of 8 gunmen, the marines repelled the attack injuring one of the gunmen. After the firefight was over, all gunmen were detained. Three of them were of Honduran nationality and one was an El Salvadoran.
  - On the same day, Naval personnel on a patrol mission spotted a suspicious group of men on a highway in Valle Hermoso, Tamaulipas. The group of men were three municipal police officers and one ministry police officer, the detained were also discovered with a small quantity of marijuana and were stripped of their weapons. Also in Matamoros, marines arrested three teenagers while on patrol, the three suspects were caught with 300 small packages of narcotics.
- May 4 - In Matamoros, Tamaulipas. After receiving information from Mexican Naval Intelligence, Mexican Marines raided a safe house inside the city. A man was arrested during the raid, presume to be the armed guard of the safehouse, 11 hostages were also discovered. From the same Intelligence report, Marines raided another safe house where another 6 hostages were later found.
  - Monterrey, Nuevo León - Due to a successful Naval air and land surveillance operation, 5 Monterrey police officers were arrested by Marines. One of the five officers declares himself a "Halcon" (Hawk).
- May 6 - Tamaulipas. According to news reports, 1,000 heavily armed Mexican Marines on board 100 vehicles have been spotted moving into the five municipal border towns of: Ciudad Mier, Guerrero, Miguel Alemán, Camargo, and Gustavo Díaz Ordaz. These municipalities have been a battle ground between The Gulf Cartel and Los Zetas ever since their split from each other.
- June 4 - Mexican marines in an Anti-crime organization operation in San Pedro Garza García, Nuevo León, arrested four cartel suspects. One of the cartel suspects is Raúl Amberto Padilla Gómez who the Mexican government says is a financial operative within Los Zetas in San Pedro Garza García.
- June 6 - As a result of intelligence sharing by diverse agencies, Mexican marines arrested two drug cartel suspects in Nuevo Laredo. The two suspects were also found with a 9mm pistol, a briefcase with 111,000 dollars in U.S. currency, another case with 18,000 pesos and with various communications equipment.
- June 8 - Juan Alberto González, 60, presumably from Brownsville, Texas was arrested by marines in Matamoros, Tamaulipas. Naval Infantry personnel spotted the 60-year-old Brownsville man suspiciously leaving a house running to his vehicle. Marines stopped him and searched his vehicle and found a package of marijuana. After searching the home they also discovered 63 packages of marijuana that weigh 241 kilograms and various communication equipment. Juan Alberto and seized narcotics were sent to the naval installations in Matamoros.
- June 9 - During a routine patrol in Colima, Mexican marines were ambushed by Beltrán-Leyva Cartel gunmen. The marines managed to repel the attack and resulted the deaths of 8 of the gunmen, two of the gunmen are of Colombian nationality, 5 marines were injured with one in serious condition. Naval personnel also secured a 40 mm grenade launcher with five rounds, three grenades, nine rifles, five sub-machine guns, ammunition of various calibers, 26 magazines, communication equipment and four vehicles.
- June 11 - In a joint operation with the PGR, and the Army, naval personnel located and seized 2,682 packages of cocaine and ephedrine, the packages were hidden inside pieces of wood that was on board a container ship.
- June 14 - 5 kilometers west of the town of Vallecillos, Nuevo Leon, marines raided a compound were 8 tons of marijuana was found. Naval personnel arrested one person and seized two vehicles.

== 2011 ==
- July 1 - Mexican Marines clashed with Los Zeta gunmen in the town of San José de Lourdes, Zacatecas. Marines were on patrol when suddenly they were fired on by gunmen from a safehouse, initiating a gunfight. The Marines managed to repel the attack and took over the safehouse, killing 15 gunmen and capturing 17 suspects.

== See also ==
- Timeline of the Mexican drug war
- Mexican Armed Forces
