= Hurricane Francine =

Category 2 Atlantic hurricane in 2024

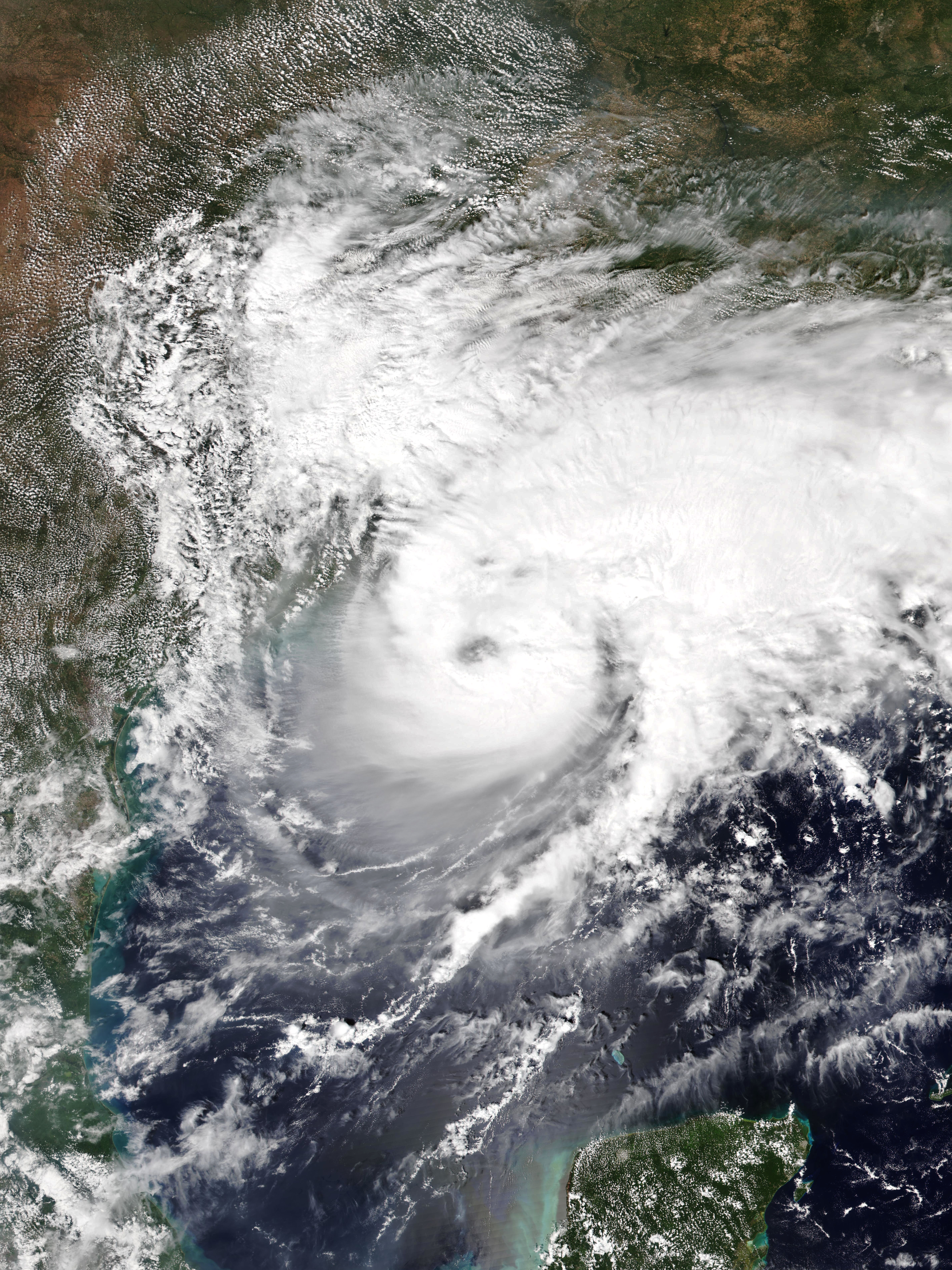
- Francine near peak intensity while approaching Louisiana on September 11

Meteorological history
- Formed: September 9, 2024
- Remnant low: September 12, 2024
- Dissipated: September 14, 2024

Category 2 hurricane
- 1-minute sustained (SSHWS/NWS)
- Highest winds: 105 mph (165 km/h)
- Lowest pressure: 972 mbar (hPa); 28.70 inHg

Overall effects
- Fatalities: None
- Damage: $1.3 billion (2024 USD)
- Areas affected: Eastern Mexico; United States Gulf Coast; particularly Mississippi and Louisiana
- IBTrACS
- Part of the 2024 Atlantic hurricane season

Hurricane Francine was a moderately strong tropical cyclone that brought extensive flooding to parts of the Gulf of Mexico coast, especially Louisiana in September 2024. The sixth named storm and fourth hurricane of the annual season, its formation brought the end to a significant quiet period in tropical cyclone formation in the Atlantic. Originating from a tropical wave that was initially spotted in the central Atlantic by the National Hurricane Center (NHC) in late August, the disturbance that eventually became Francine began gradually organizing on September 7 as it exited the Yucatán Peninsula into the Bay of Campeche. The disturbance consolidated further and was designated by the NHC as Potential Tropical Cyclone Six on September 8. The next day, it became Tropical Storm Francine. It made landfall in Louisiana on September 11 as a Category 2 hurricane with wind speeds of 105 mph (169 km/h), which left moderate damage in Louisiana and Mississippi. Afterward, it quickly weakened into a remnant low on September 12. Francine dissipated on September 14 over Arkansas.

Heavy precipitation fell in northeastern Mexico, causing flooding in Matamoros area neighborhoods. Oil and natural gas production in the Gulf of Mexico was also disrupted. Approximately 500,000 people lost electricity in Louisiana, Mississippi, and Alabama combined, with Francine downing numerous power lines and trees in those three states, blocking many roads. In Louisiana, flooding, high winds, and falling trees damaged hundreds of structures in Jefferson and St. Charles parishes. Precipitation from the cyclone peaked at 14.61 in (371 mm) near Navarre, Florida. The National Centers for Environmental Information (NCEI) estimated that Francine caused about $1.3 billion in damage.

== Meteorological history ==
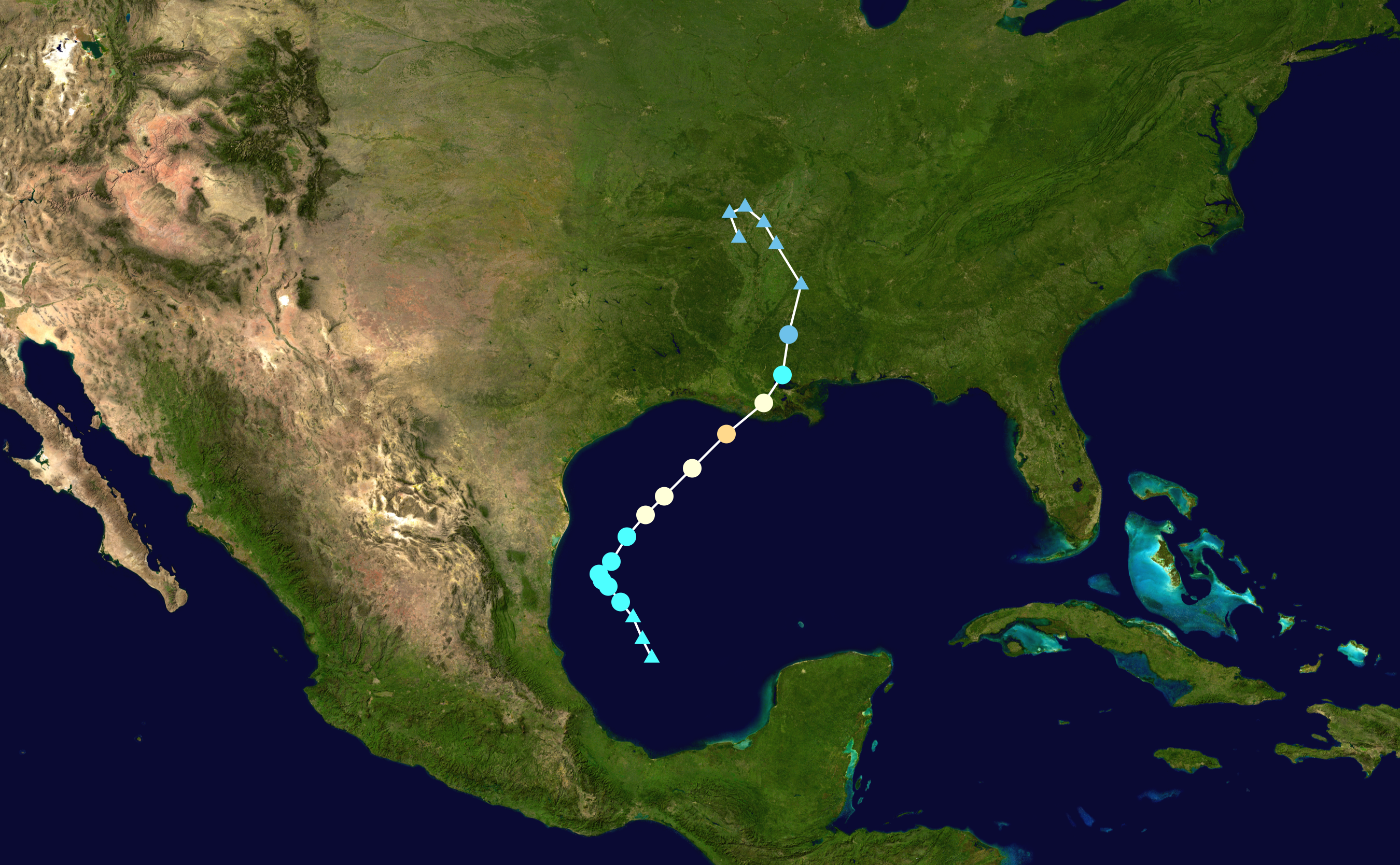
Map plotting the storm's track and intensity, according to the Saffir–Simpson scale Map key Saffir–Simpson scale Tropical depression (≤38 mph, ≤62 km/h) Tropical storm (39–73 mph, 63–118 km/h) Category 1 (74–95 mph, 119–153 km/h) Category 2 (96–110 mph, 154–177 km/h) Category 3 (111–129 mph, 178–208 km/h) Category 4 (130–156 mph, 209–251 km/h) Category 5 (≥157 mph, ≥252 km/h) Unknown Storm type Tropical cyclone Subtropical cyclone Extratropical cyclone, remnant low, tropical disturbance, or monsoon depression

A tropical wave departed West Africa on August 25. The wave moved slowly across the tropical Atlantic, spasmodically generating convection. It struck the Lesser Antilles on September 2, its trek across the Caribbean enhanced by a low-level easterly jet stream. Late on September 5, deep convection intensified as the northern flank of the wave crossed the Yucatán Peninsula. The system entered the Bay of Campeche early on September 7. It then began interacting with a front linked to a non-tropical low-pressure area sited over the northern Gulf of Mexico. A distinct cyclone with an oblong surface flow formed by 18:00 UTC over the Bay of Campeche. By September 8, the motion became pronounced about 355 mi (570 km) south-southeast of the Rio Grande delta. Winds quickly increased to tropical-storm force, due to the effects of the front and the Sierra Madre Oriental. It was designated as Potential Tropical Cyclone Six at 21:00 UTC on September 8. By September 9, thunderstorms congealed near the organized surface center, marking the birth of Tropical Storm Francine about 245 mi (395 km) southeast of the Rio Grande.

A thin mid-level ridge over Florida guided Francine slowly northwestward toward coastal southern Texas and northern Mexico later that day, dropping heavy rains regionally. Francine gradually strengthened, rotating around the western axis of the ridge early on September 10. Later that day, it turned sharply northeastward ahead of a shortwave trough transiting the southern United States. On the morning of September 11, it became a hurricane, aided by light wind shear and warm sea surface temperatures about 350 mi (565 km) southwest of Morgan City, Louisiana. It accelerated northeastward, developing an eye and strengthening as it neared the Louisiana coastline, despite upper-level winds caused by the trough beginning to disrupt its structure on satellite imagery. Hurricane Francine made landfall at 22:00 UTC that day about 25 mi (40 km) south-southwest of Morgan City with winds of 105 mph (170 km/h), equal to Category 2 intensity. Continuing northeastward early on September 12, it weakened to a tropical storm upon reaching the western Lake Pontchartrain area at 06:00 UTC. Turning northward, the decaying storm traversed central Mississippi by 12:00 UTC and degenerated into a tropical depression. By 18:00 UTC on that day, it underwent extratropical transition, merging with a front. It then moved over northern Mississippi and central Arkansas, drifted southeastward, and dissipated on September 14 over southeastern Arkansas.

== Preparations ==
=== Mexico ===
Tropical storm watches were issued from Barra del Tordo to the mouth of the Rio Grande. Other parts of Northeast Mexico were placed under a tropical storm warning. Tamaulipas shut down schools in Matamoros, San Fernando, and Valle Hermoso.

=== United States ===
ExxonMobil and Shell canceled operations in the Gulf of Mexico and evacuated their employees. Amtrak modified and/or suspended service to New Orleans from September 11–18.

==== Louisiana ====
Hurricane warnings were issued from Sabine Pass to Morgan City. Louisiana was placed under a state of emergency by the governor. The governor also sent 2,300 guardsmen of the Louisiana National Guard to parishes that were likely to be affected. Several school districts in Louisiana closed in preparation for Francine. Mandatory evacuations were issued for Grand Isle, Lafitte, and Barataria. Lafourche, Terrebonne, and Washington Parishes issued curfews. St. Mary and Terrebonne Parishes raised their floodgates. Iberia Parish and Baton Rouge distributed sandbags.

Louis Armstrong International Airport canceled all flights. Five USPS locations were shut down. Port Fourchon, a major supplier of offshore oil producers, and the Louisiana Offshore Oil Port were closed. Two national historic parks in southern Louisiana were closed as the hurricane approached.

==== Elsewhere ====
South Texas was placed under a tropical storm warning as Francine approached. Galveston County raised their emergency management facility's level to two. Governor Greg Abbott mobilized water rescue teams.

The coast of Mississippi and Alabama was placed under a tropical storm warning. Governor of Mississippi Tate Reeves issued a state of emergency declaration. Jackson, Mississippi, set up a shelter in the police training academy. Several schools in the state were closed for Francine.

== Impact ==
=== Mexico ===
Several areas in Matamoros flooded from 200 millimetres (7.9 in) of rain, causing schools to close. Aid from the Mexican Government was requested as a result. Water pumps were set up across the city in response. Plans DN-III and Tamaulipas were initiated to provide aid to areas affected by Francine.

Total Rainfall
State	Total rainfall
Alabama	13.65 in (347 mm)
Florida	14.61 in (371 mm)
Georgia	7.69 in (195 mm)
Louisiana	11.93 in (303 mm)
Mississippi	8.63 in (219 mm)
Missouri	3.47 in (88 mm)
Oklahoma	6.58 in (167 mm)
Tennessee	9.16 in (233 mm)
Texas	7.44 in (189 mm)

=== United States ===
KHDC loop of Hurricane Francine making landfall in Louisiana on September 11, 2024.

According to NCEI, the damage across the United States was estimated at $1.3 billion.

Exports out to the Gulf of Mexico were disrupted as a result of Francine, and the storm knocked out 39% of oil and natural gas production. Reductions in production caused crude oil national prices to jump by 2% on September 11.

==== Texas ====
By September 9, Port O'Connor was experiencing flooding conditions. Winds gusts of 38 mph (61 km/h) were observed in Brownsville. Rainfall in the state peaked at 7.44 in (189 mm) in Brownsville. Flooding caused the SpaceX Starbase to become inaccessible.

==== Louisiana ====
Francine made landfall in Southern Louisiana, Terrebonne Parish, with sustained winds of 105 mph (170 km/h) at 22:00 UTC on September 11. Storm surge was about 8 feet (2.4 m). Livingston received two feet (0.61 m) of storm surge from Lake Maurepas. A tornado warning was issued for Plaquemines Parish. Seven inches (180 mm) of rain fell in the New Orleans area. Around 450,000 people suffered from power outages, most of which were caused by fallen debris, and around 500 people took refuge in emergency shelters. Francine's winds downed numerous trees and power lines, which resulted in blocked roads. Numerous streets sustained flooding as a result of heavy rainfall. More than 500 homes in Jefferson Parish were damaged. Iberville Parish reported 352 blockages in waterways. New Orleans's wastewater system encountered issues, prompting advisories to limit water usage. The flash flooding resulted in several flash flood emergency alerts being issued. Several rivers crested in Saint Tammany Parish. Duncan Canal overflowed. The Lafourche Parish Sheriff's Office conducted numerous water rescues northwest of Thibodaux after rising flood waters surrounded multiple housing units, and all residents, including many small children, were safely evacuated. Other water rescues were also carried out in other parts of the Thibodaux area as well as the Kraemer area. Miles Crawford, a 39-year-old man, rescued another man who had water up to his head, from a sinking truck below an overpass in New Orleans by smashing the truck's back window with a hammer and pulling him out through it and cutting his hand in the process. Two other people were injured: a Louisiana State Police officer who was struck by a falling tree while removing downed trees on Interstate 10, and a woman in Ascension Parish who was also hit and pinned by a fallen tree. Francine caused 89 fish kills over 2,000,000 acres (810,000 ha) through making water hypoxic, particularly in canals and bayous. The first fish kills were reported on September 13, in the Atchafalaya Basin.

The federal government approved a FEMA declaration. According to property data company CoreLogic, insured losses caused by Francine could reach $1.5 billion. Moody's Analytics estimates over $2 billion in damage, and AccuWeather estimates over $9 billion in damage. As of January 2025, damage is estimated to be at US$1.3 billion.

In the aftermath of the storm, more pumping infrastructure was implemented in Morgan City, with projects finishing in 2026.

==== Mississippi ====
Strong winds swept through the Mississippi Coast before sunrise on September 12. The Jackson County Office of Emergency Services reported minor damage across the county, including power outages, downed trees, and flooded streets. As Francine moved further north, it was downgraded to a tropical depression, bringing heavy rainfall to Jackson and central Mississippi. South Mississippi faced significant flooding and related issues during the storm's passage. Other areas of the state also experienced downed trees and power lines. During the morning of September 12, 60,000 customers experienced power outages in Mississippi. Around 500 people were in state shelters. One injury was reported in Jones County. The highest recorded wind speed was 39 mph (63 km/h) in Gulfport, with winds gusting to 49 mph (79 km/h). The highest recorded rainfall was 3.98 in (10.1 cm) in Madison County. Nine boats were abandoned in Pass Christian's harbor as a result of Francine and were not approved for removal until December 2025.

==== Elsewhere ====
There were 39,000 reported power outages in Alabama. Trees and power lines were also downed in the western portion of the state. Sustained winds of 44 mph (71 km/h) were observed at Bon Secour. In Danville, rainfall accumulated to 13.65 in (347 mm).

Tropical storm conditions occurred in the Florida Panhandle. Sustained winds of 44 mph (71 km/h) were observed at Pensacola Beach with higher gusts of up to 51 mph (82 km/h). The highest rainfall total was in Navarre with 14.61 in (371 mm) of rain.

Tennessee was buffeted by rainstorms for a few days.

== See also ==
- Weather of 2024
- Tropical cyclones in 2024
- Timeline of the 2024 Atlantic hurricane season
- List of Category 2 Atlantic hurricanes
- List of Louisiana hurricanes (2000–present)
