= Duncan Canal =

Duncan Canal may refer to several places:

- Duncan Canal (Louisiana), the West Return Canal outside of New Orleans
- Duncan Canal (Alaska), an inland waterway in the Alexander Archipelago of Alaska's panhandle
- Duncan Canal (volcanic field), a volcanic field on Kupreanof Island, Alaska
