= Ixtoc-Alfa =

Mexican Military Base

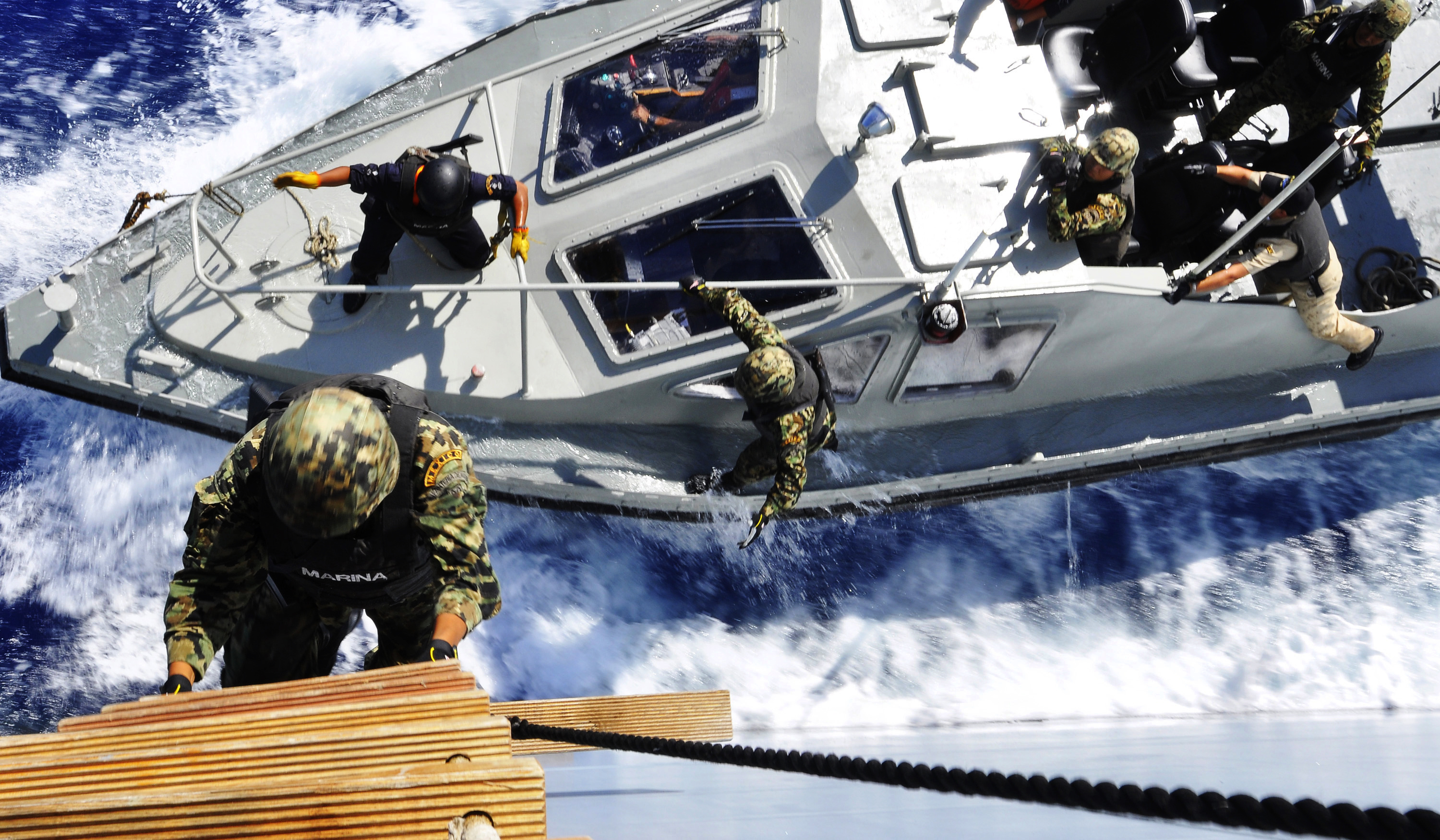
Mexican Marines climb a Jacob's ladder to the deck of the Germany navy's combat support ship Frankfurt am Main (AM 1412)

Ixtoc-Alfa is a counter-terrorism base created by the Mexican Navy for the purpose of preventing terrorist attacks on the country's Gulf of Mexico oilfields. It was first opened on 22 December 2003.

The base is located on the Campeche Bank, a coastal shelf off the Yucatán Peninsula. The base currently has a MI-17 MBT helicopter, 90H Fast patrol Boats. A special group named ASIES also provides security for better coverage and quick response in case of sabotage or if there is an unidentified vessel in the area. The area is permanently patrolled by Sa'ar 4.5 class missile boat navy vessels. Grumman E-2 Hawkeye early-alert planes also add up to the task.
