= Mexican response to Hurricane Katrina =

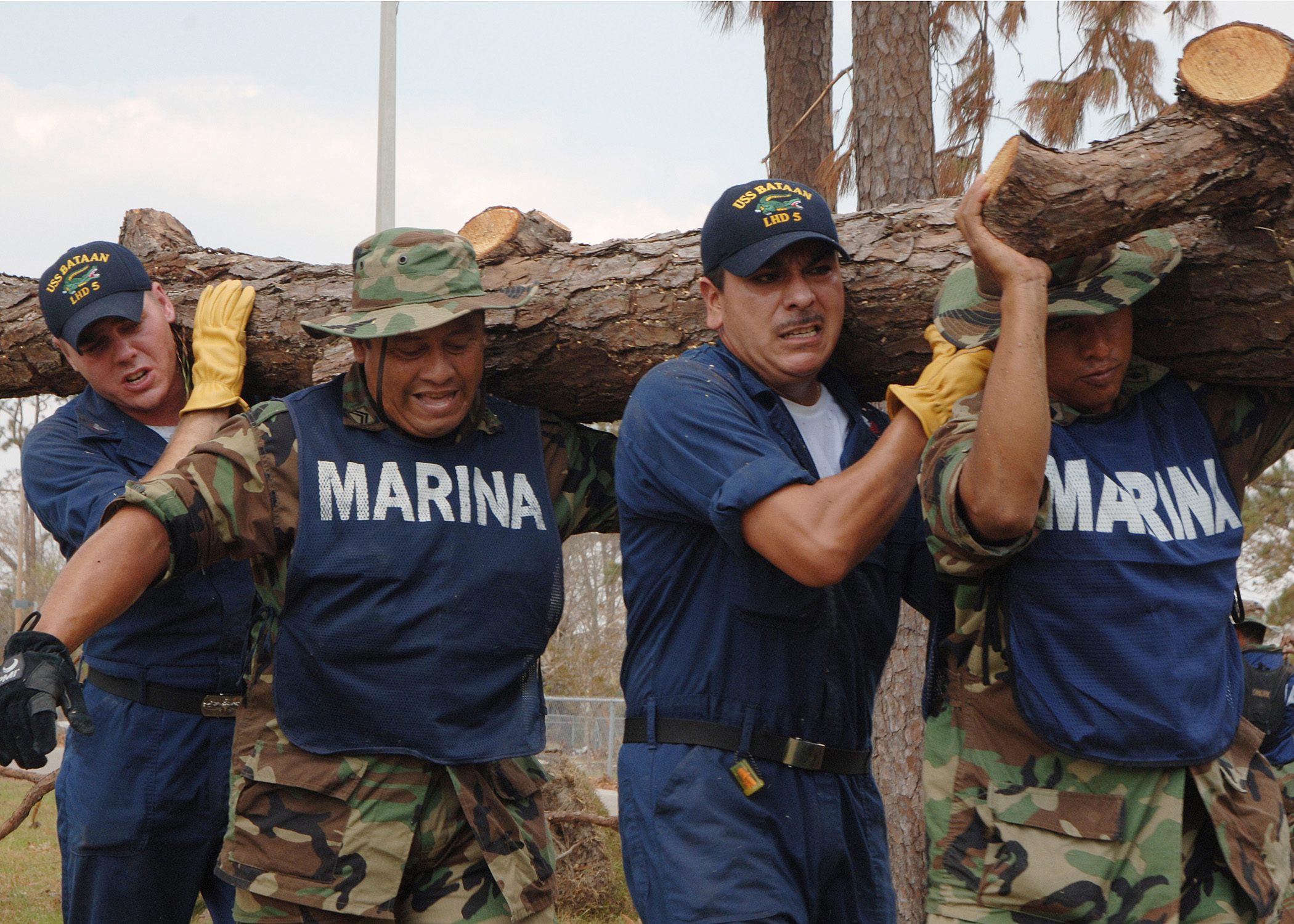
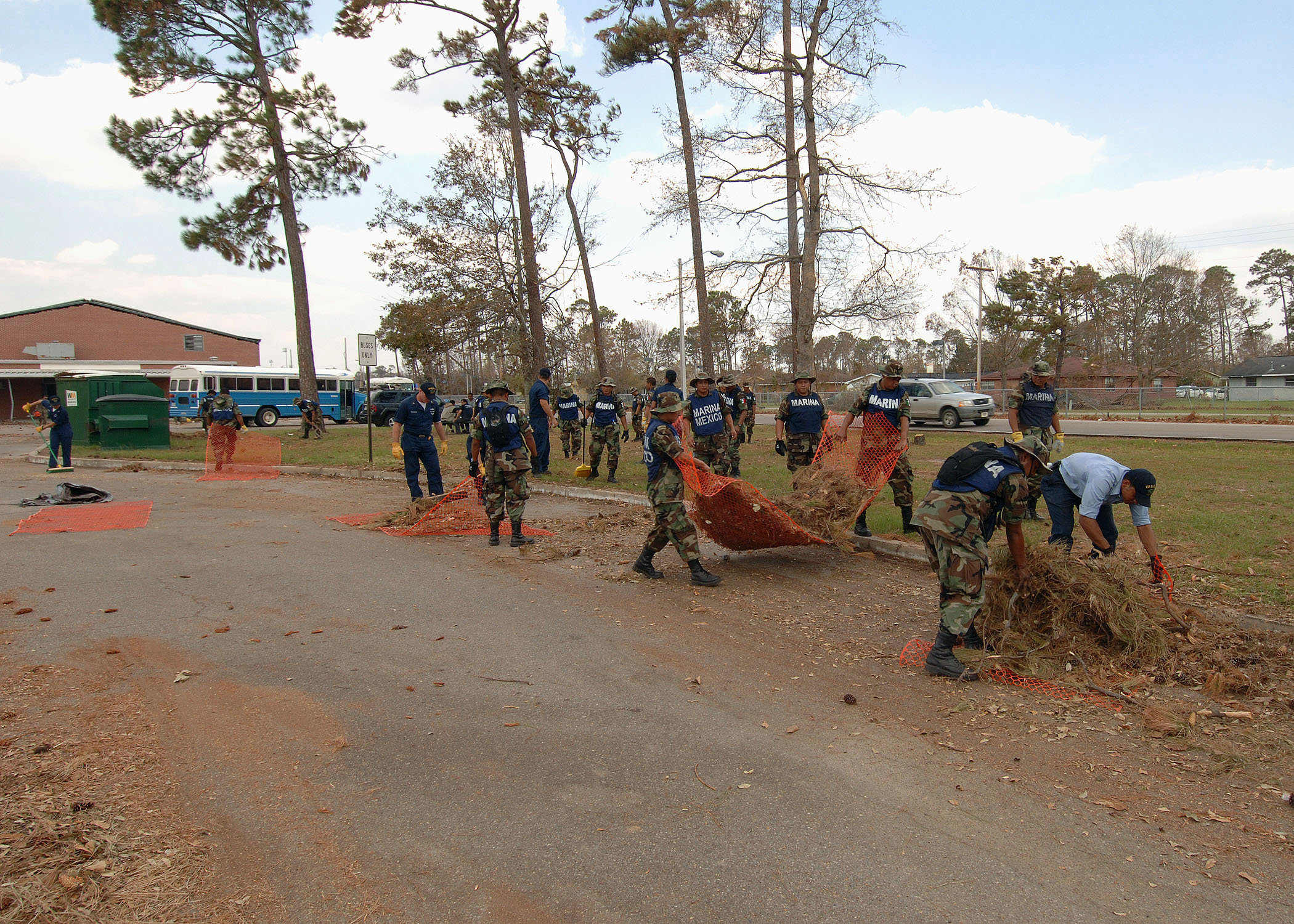
Mexican marines and U.S. Navy sailors cleaning up debris outside of a hurricane-stricken Mississippian elementary school in September 2005.

In September 2005, units of the Mexican Armed Forces responded to the emergency situations after Hurricane Katrina with aid and assistance, appearing as a flagged, uniformed force in the United States for the first time since World War II in the 1940s and the first operational deployment of Mexican troops to the U.S. in 159 years.

The Mexican contingent was based out of Kelly Air Force Base in San Antonio, Texas for the duration of the deployment. The Mexican military conducted aid and cleanup missions in Harrison County, Mississippi in conjunction with Dutch navy sailors, U.S. Marines, and the U.S. Navy.

== Background ==
In late August 2005, Hurricane Katrina arrived in the southeastern portion of the contiguous United States, causing severe damage and destruction in several U.S. states and killing more than a thousand people.

== Response activities ==
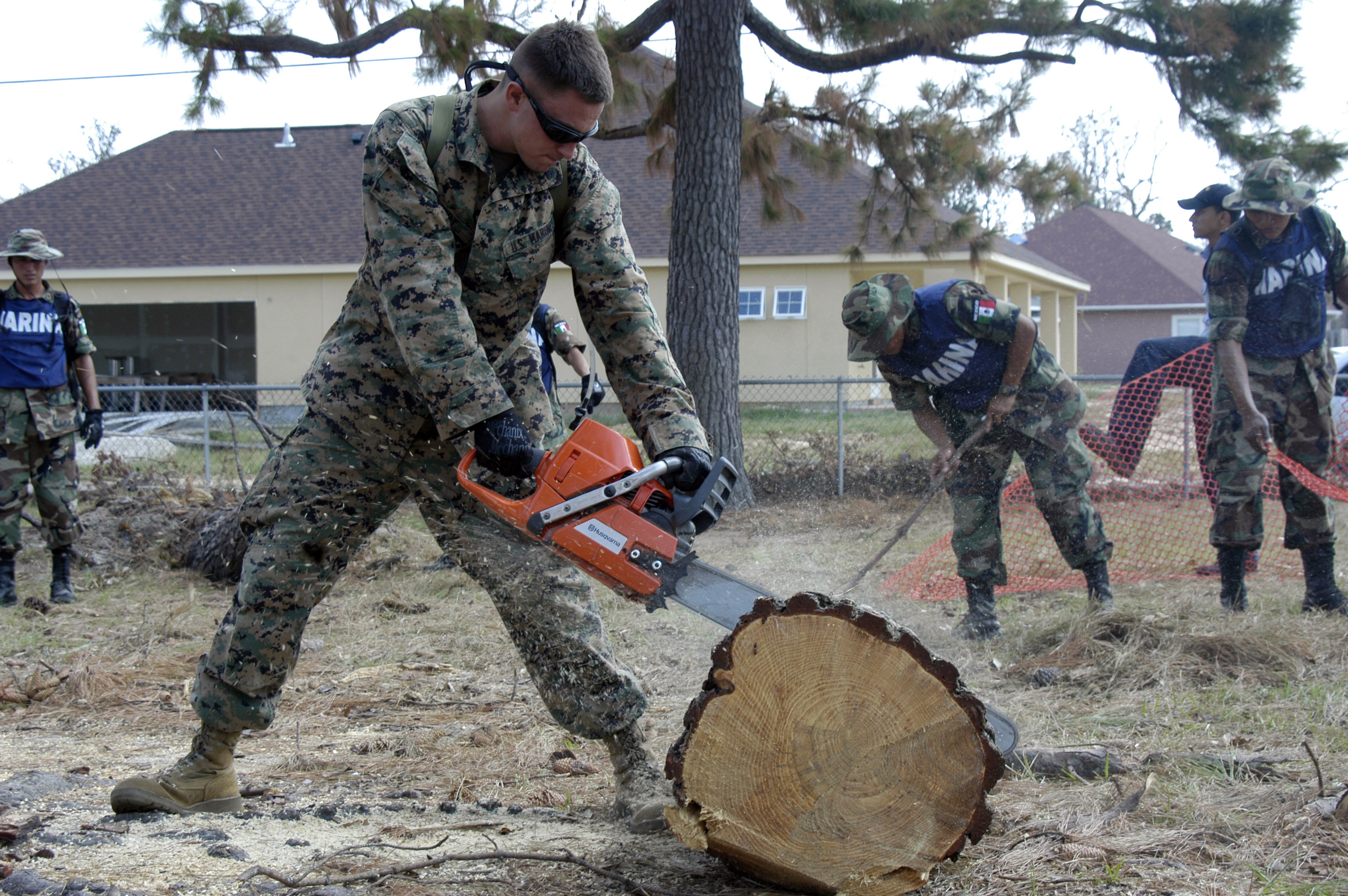
U.S. and Mexican marines cleaning up hurricane debris outside of a Mississippian elementary school.

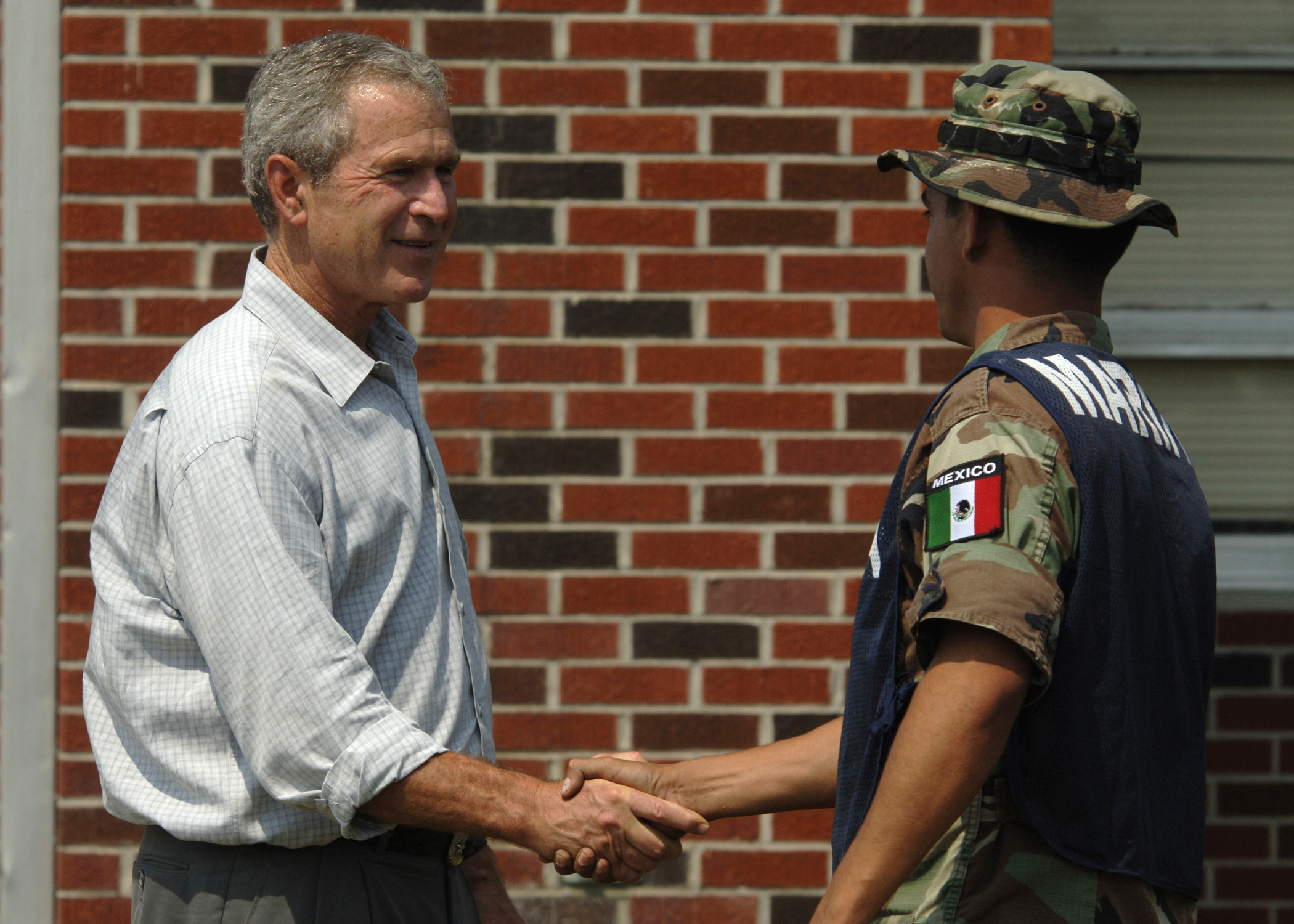
U.S. President George W. Bush conveys his gratitude to a Mexican marine on their cleanup efforts

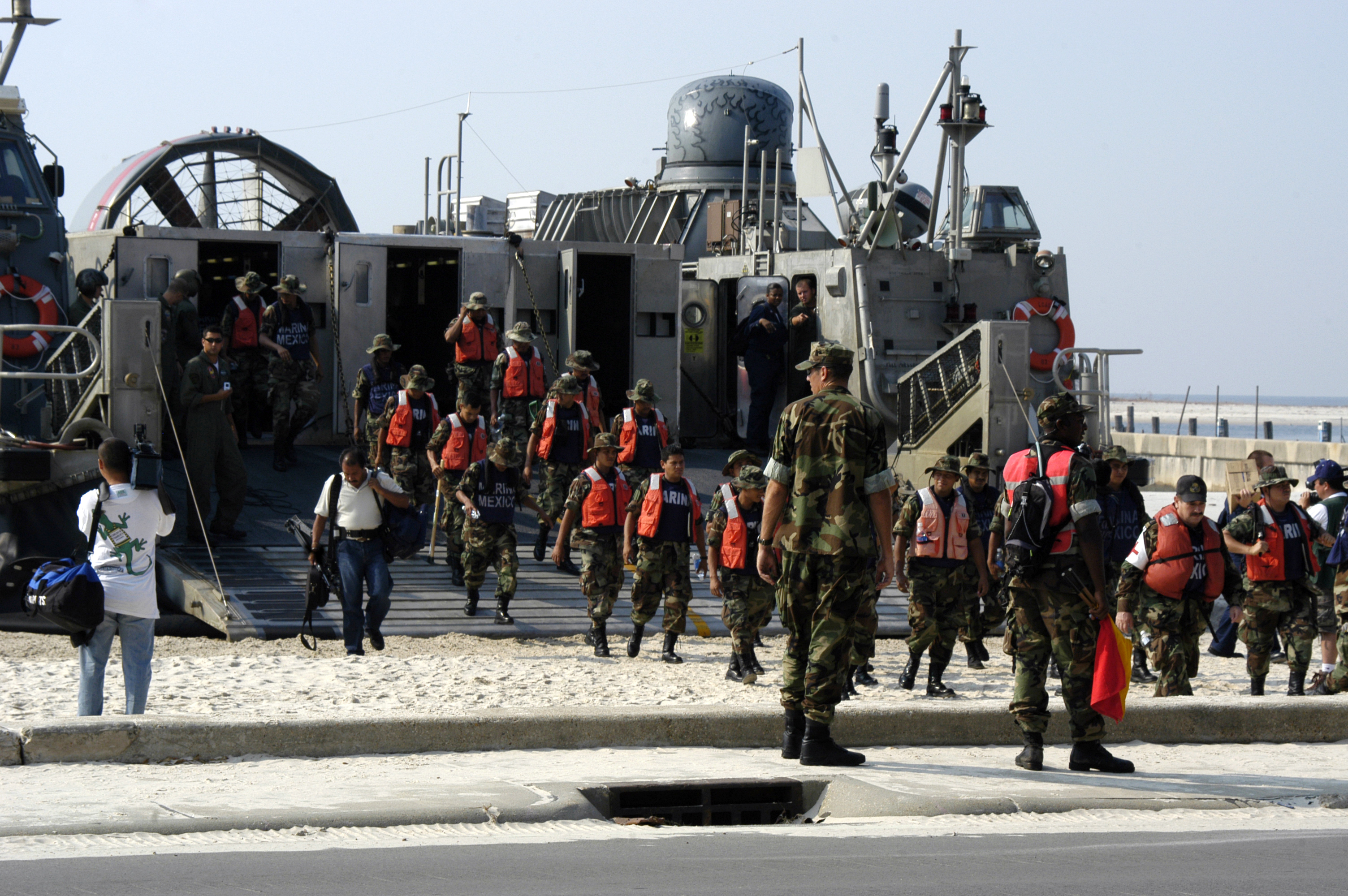
Mexican navy sailors assigned to the Mexican amphibious warship ARM Papaloapan (P-411) disembark from a U.S. Navy landing craft as they prepare to work on rehabilitation projects in an around Biloxi, Mississippi.

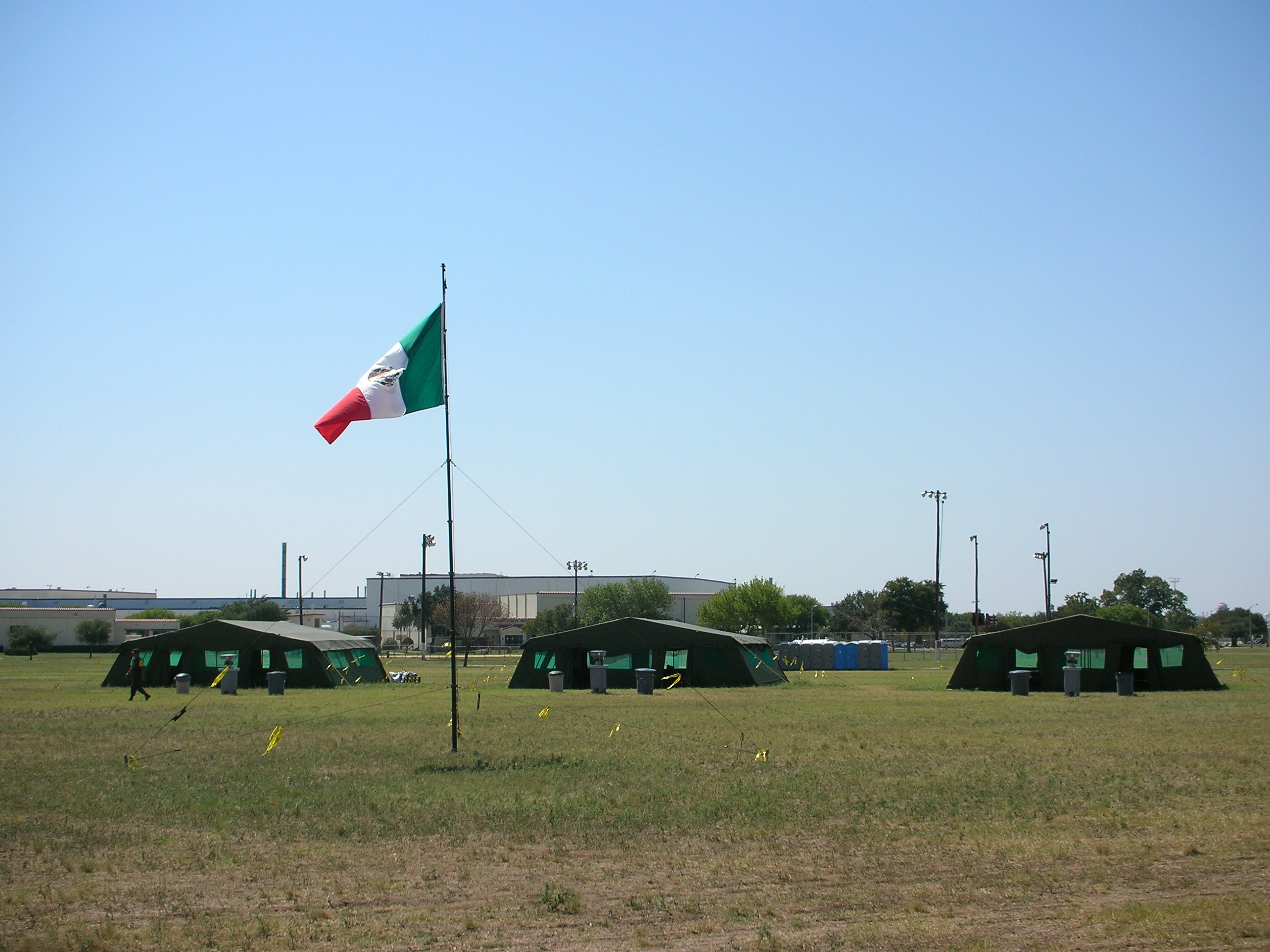
The Mexican army's camp at Kelly AFB during their deployment to the U.S.

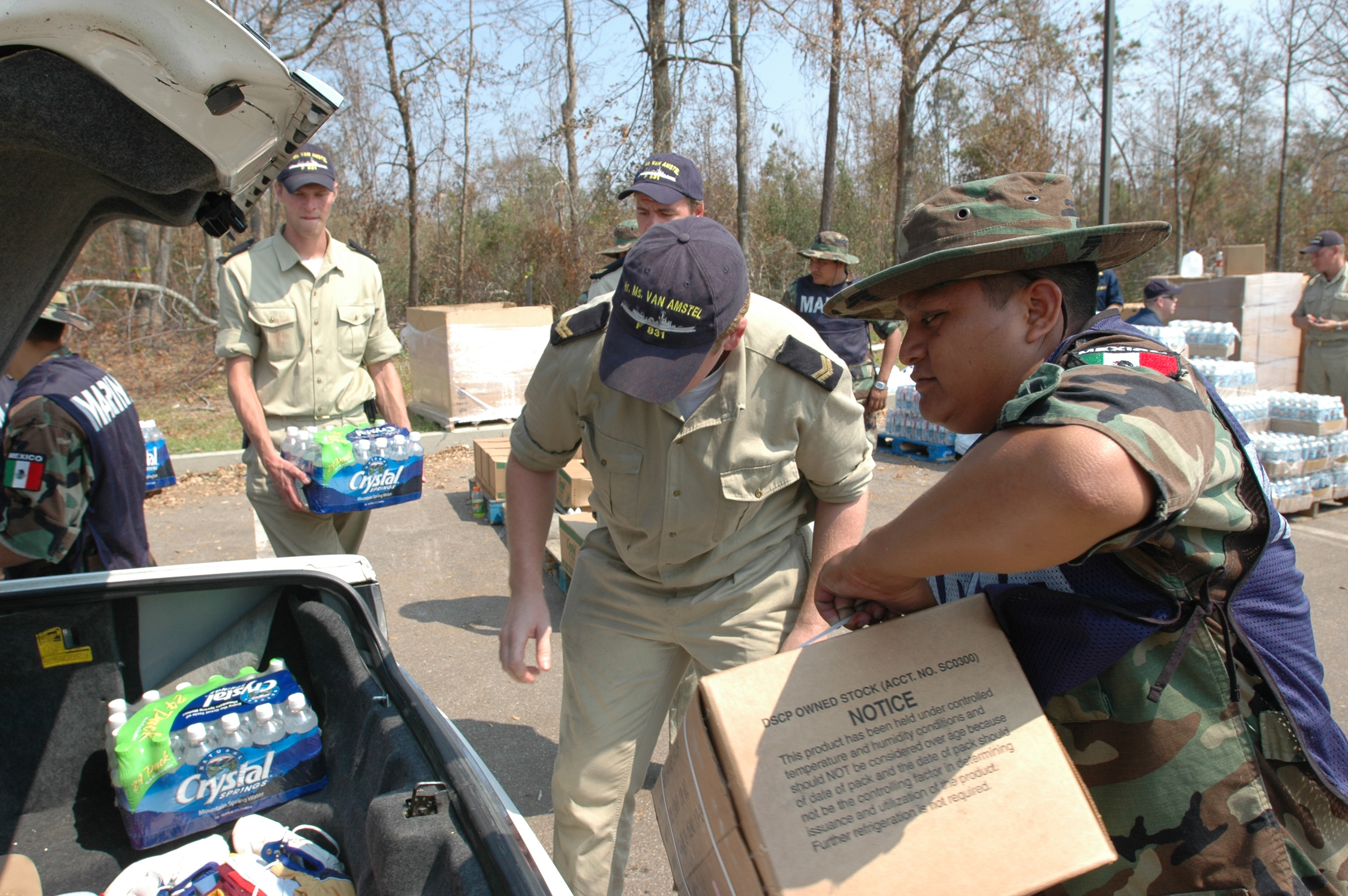
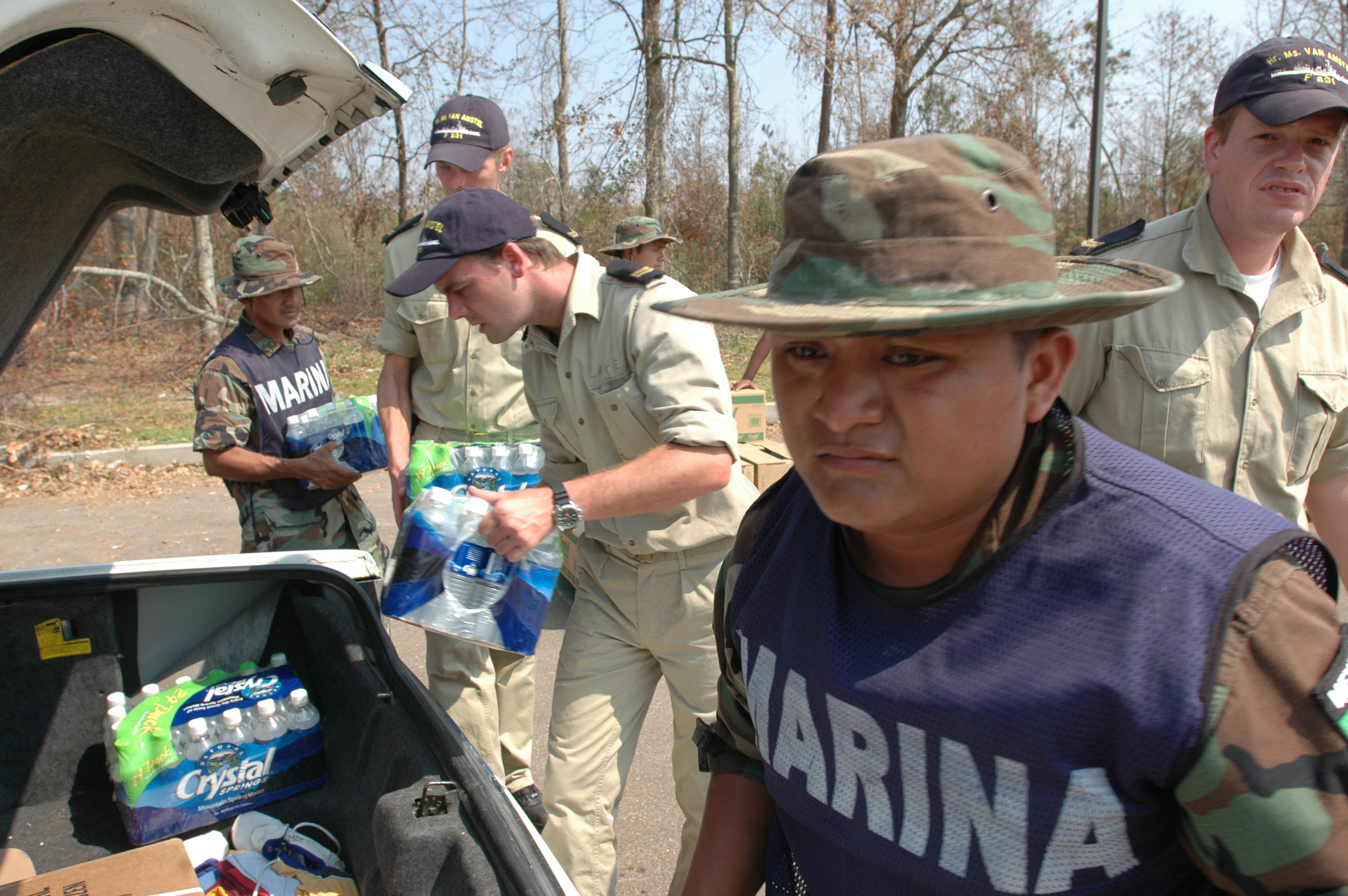
Mexican marines and Dutch sailors distributing aid and foodstuffs to Mississippian hurricane victims in September 2005.

In late August 2005, Hurricane Katrina struck the southeastern portion of the contiguous United States, causing severe damage and destruction in several U.S. states and killing more than a thousand people.

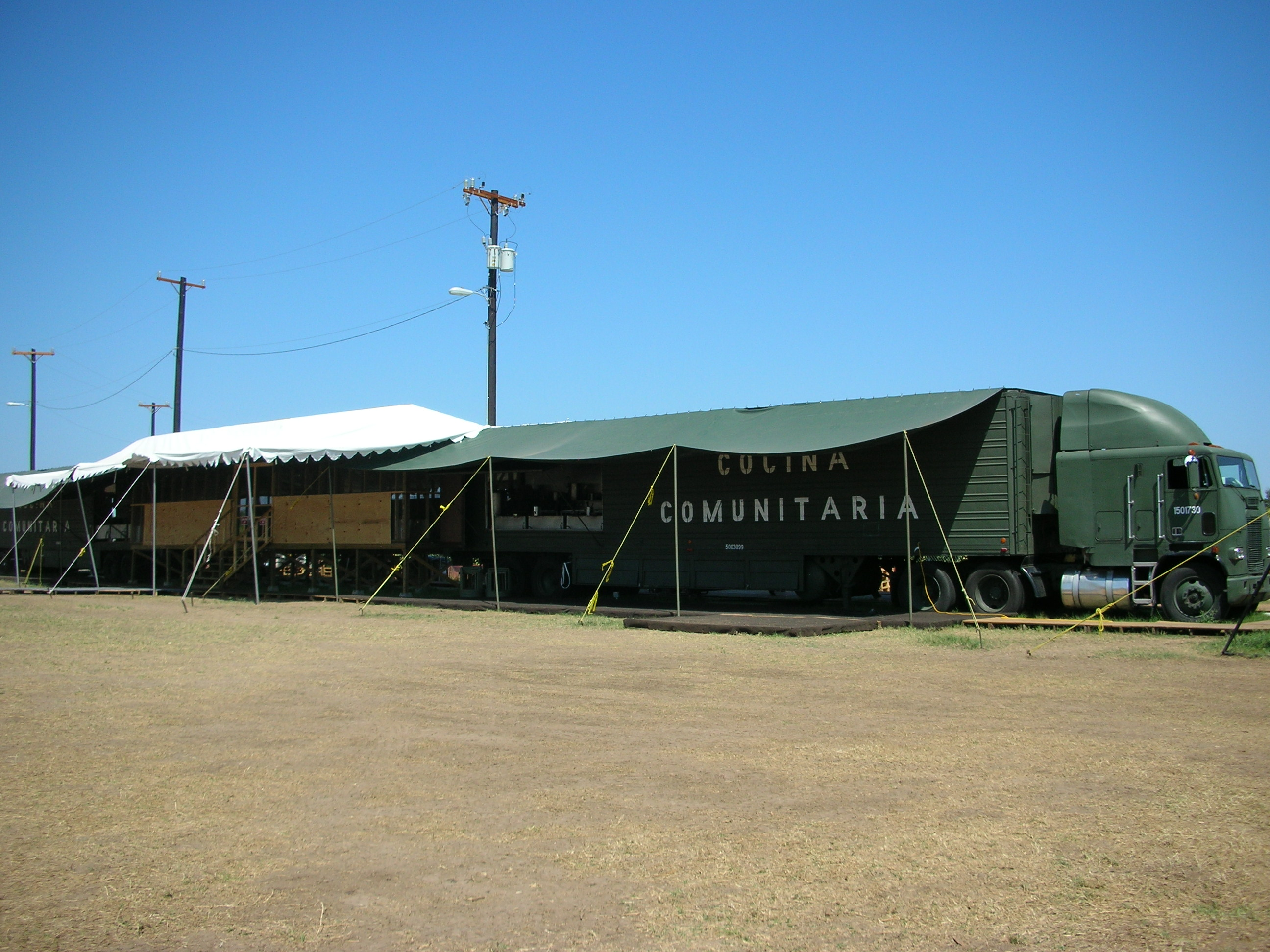
A Mexican Army mobile kitchen that was sent to Texas.

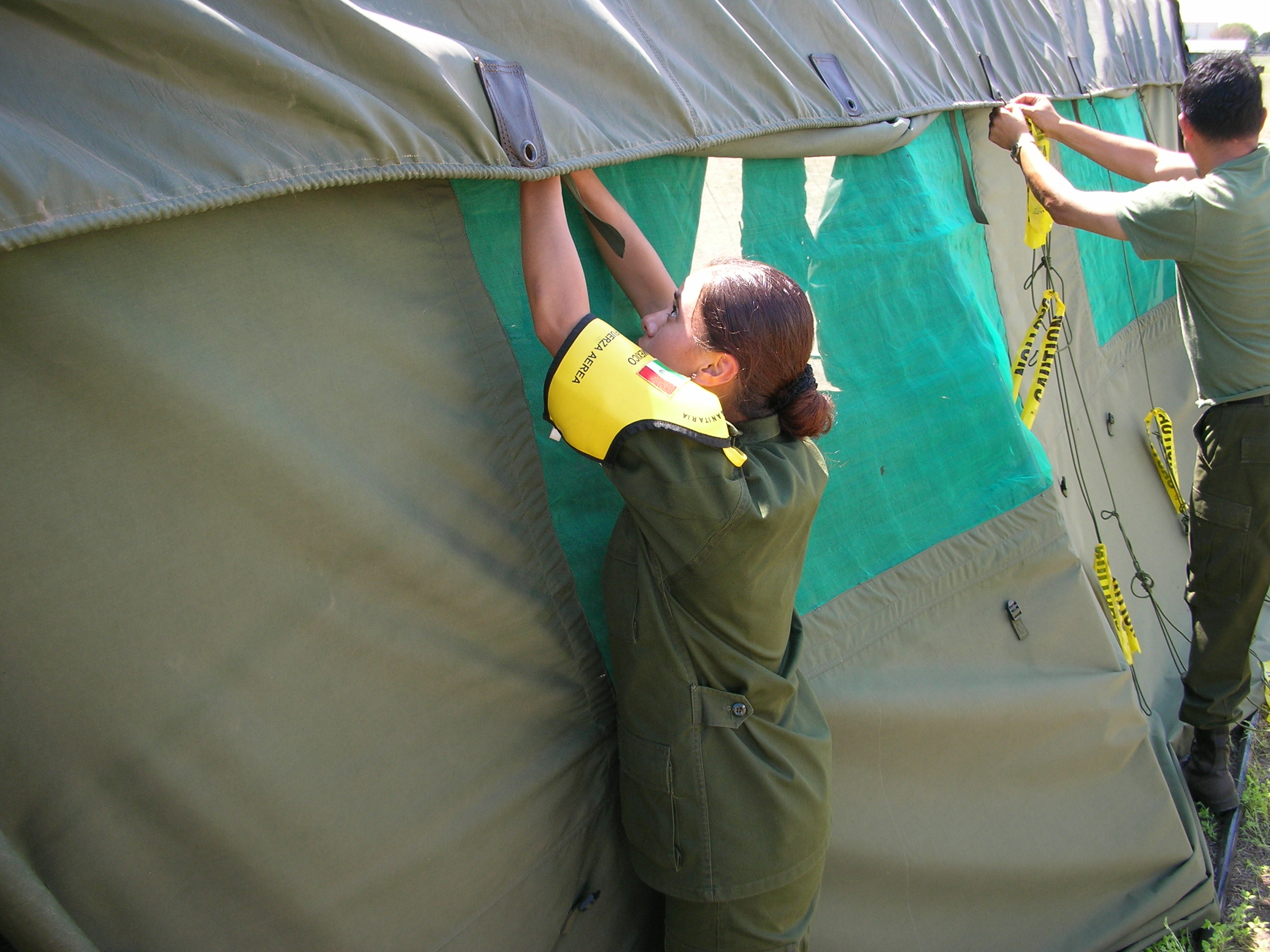
Mexican soldiers disassembling tents near the end of the deployment.

On August 30, 2005, Mexican President Vicente Fox sent his condolences to U.S. President George W. Bush regarding the hurricane's effects: "In the name of the people and of the government of Mexico, I assure you of my deepest and most sincere condolences for the devastating effects caused by Hurricane Katrina". He also mentioned his instructions to the Secretary of Foreign Affairs; that the United States would be provided with any kind of help that was needed.

The Mexican Red Cross sent four rescue experts from the state of Jalisco to assist in rescue efforts in New Orleans. The government of the Mexican Federal District also pledged to help with relief efforts.

On September 4, the Mexican Navy offered ships, buses and helicopters to assist in rescue missions. The offer was accepted and the Mexican ship Papaloapan departed from Tampico, with two Mi-17 helicopters, eight all-terrain vehicles, seven amphibious vehicles, two tankers, radio communication equipment, medical personnel and 250 tons of food.

On September 5, the Secretariat of Social Development pledged 200 tons of food, to be delivered in five airplanes by the Mexican Air Force.

The Secretariat of National Defense, on September 6, sent Mexican soldiers with expertise in rescue missions to the area affected by Katrina. Also sent the same day were 35 vehicles and 162.7 tons of food, carried by trucks traveling through the U.S. state of Texas.

The members of congress of the Federal District pledged a day of salary each on September 7, to be sent to those affected by Katrina. The National Commission of Water sent bottled water and canned food upon request. Naval ship Papaloapan arrived the same day, with 389 soldiers and other personnel from the Mexican Navy. Units of the Mexican Army, totaling 184 people, arrived by land with 35 military vehicles.

On September 8, the Mexican Army was received with honors at Kelly Air Force Base by the mayor of San Antonio, Texas. Local news channels noted the fact that the Mexican Army operated on U.S. soil after 159 years of absence, with the last time being the Mexican–American War in the 19th century.

On September 9, U.S. and Mexican marines, along with U.S. Navy sailors, helped clean up hurricane debris outside of an elementary school in D'Iberville, Mississippi.

On September 12, Mexican marines and Dutch navy sailors distributed aid supplies to residents in D'Iberville, Mississippi.

== End of mission ==
On September 25, the 184 person Mexican army contingent completed its 20-day-long mission to provide relief to hurricane victims and relief workers from Katrina and Rita. The Mexican Army's field kitchen, a tractor-trailer turned into a kitchen, served 170,000 meals during their deployment to the former Kelly Air Force Base. They also assisted in the distribution and management of more than 184,000 tons of supplies.

On September 26, 2005, in a small ceremony conducted by the Mexican consulate, the Mexican troops ceremonially ended their mission. They broke down their camp, packed their equipment, folded their flag and drove back to Mexico.

== See also ==
- Hurricane Katrina disaster relief
- Mexico–United States relations
- Military of Mexico
- Mexico's response to the December 2004 Indian Ocean earthquake and tsunami
- Mexico's response to Hurricane Katrina
- Mexico's response to the October 2005 Kashmir earthquake
- Mexico's response to the May 2008 Sichuan earthquake
- Mexico's response to the 2010 Haiti earthquake
- Mexico's response to the February and March 2010 Chile earthquake
- Mexico's response to the March 2011 Japan earthquake and tsunami
- Mexico's response to Typhoon Haiyan
- Mexico's response to the April and May 2015 Nepal earthquake
