= Mexican Armed Forces =

Armed forces of the United Mexican States

- Fuerzas Armadas de Mexico
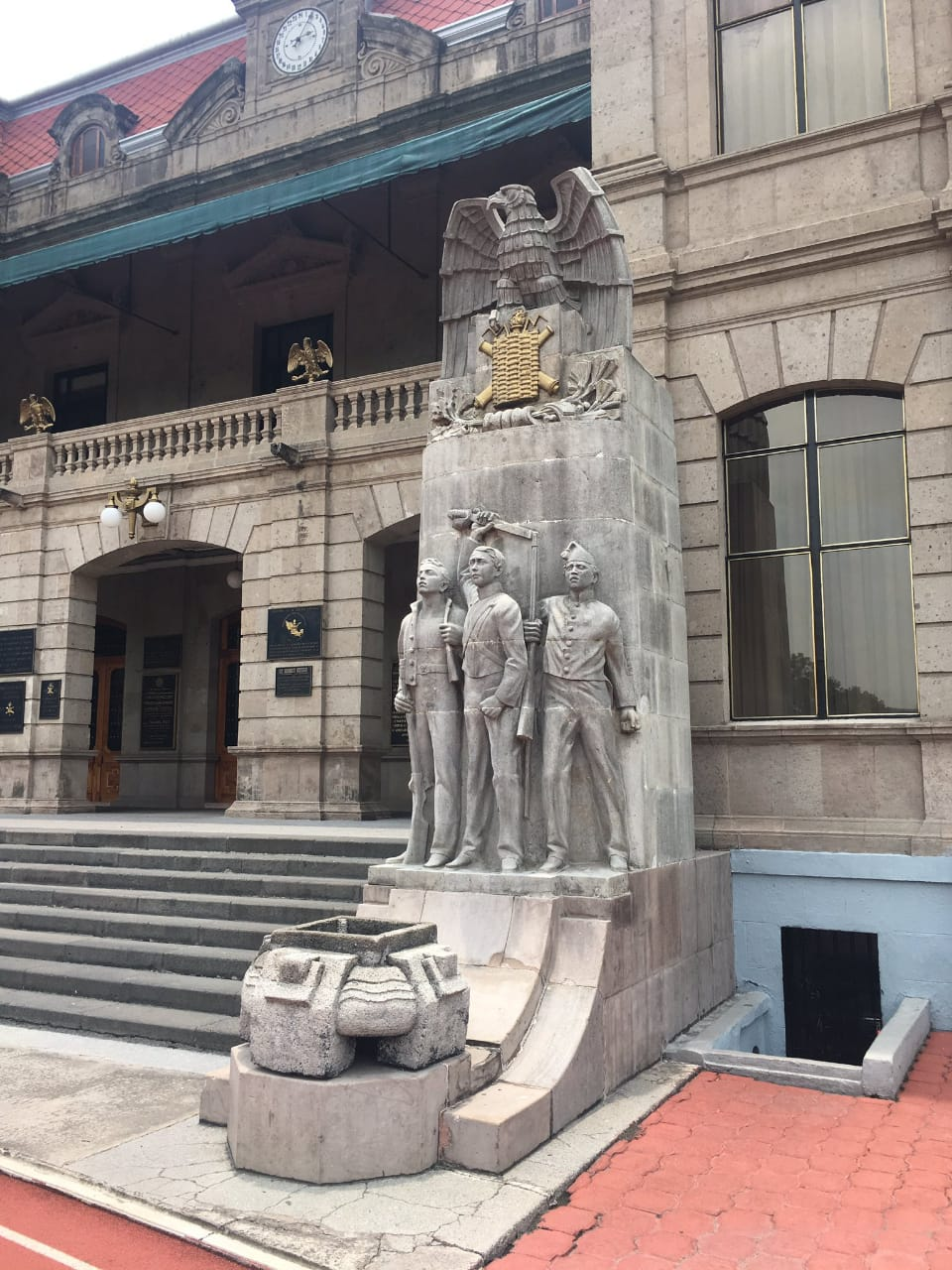
- Monument to the Boy Heroes also known as Los Niños Héroes at the Heroic Military Academy/Mexican Military Academy for sacrificing themselves in battle during the Mexican-American War.
- Founded: 1821
- Service branches: Mexican Army; Mexican Air Force; Mexican Navy; National Guard
- Headquarters: Mexico City

Leadership
- Commander-in-chief: President Claudia Sheinbaum
- Secretary of National Defense: General Ricardo Trevilla Trejo
- Secretary of the Navy: Admiral Raymundo Morales Ángeles

Personnel
- Military age: 18
- Conscription: Yes
- Active personnel: 387,000 (ranked 18th)
- Reserve personnel: 98,653

Expenditure
- Budget: US$15.652 billion (2024)
- Percent of GDP: 0.97% (2024 est.)

Related articles
- Ranks: Military ranks of Mexico

The Mexican Armed Forces (Spanish: Fuerzas Armadas de México) are the military of the United Mexican States. They are composed of two independent branches: the Mexican Army—which includes land forces, the Mexican Air Force, the Special Forces Body, and the National Guard—and the Mexican Navy, which includes naval forces, the Naval Infantry Force (marines), the Naval Aviation, the Maritime Search and Rescue unit (coast guard), and the Marine Special Forces.

The first permanent military force on Mexican soil was established by Spain during the colonial era in the eighteenth century. After Mexican independence in 1821, the military played an important political role, with army generals serving as heads of state. Following the collapse of the Federal Army during the 1910–1920 Mexican Revolution, former revolutionary generals systematically downsized the size and power of the military. Subsequently the Mexican Armed Forces are constitutionally under the civil authority of the federal government of Mexico. The Army and Navy are controlled by two separate government departments, the Secretariat of National Defense and the Secretariat of the Navy, and maintain two independent chains of command, with the joint command being Mexico's cabinet of security and the president of Mexico.

== History ==
The Spanish crown established a standing military in the late eighteenth century to shore up the defense of New Spain against foreign attacks. With the outbreak of the Mexican War of Independence, the royal army fought insurgents for independence. Royal army officer Agustín de Iturbide changed sides and made a pact with insurgent general Vicente Guerrero, bringing about independence. Iturbide became Emperor of Mexico, but was forced to abdicate by military officers. Mexico became a republic with a weak central government. General Antonio López de Santa Anna was to dominate politics for decades. Following the disastrous Mexican–American War, Santa Anna was ousted and civilian liberals took power, passing a series of laws removing military privileges and decreasing its power. The conservative military and the Roman Catholic Church allied in an unsuccessful attempt to oust the liberal reformers in a civil war. In 1862, France invaded Mexico to collect debts repudiated by the liberal government, and Conservatives approached France's ruler Napoleon III to select a monarch for Mexico. Many Mexican republicans fought the French army, winning a brief victory on 5 May 1862. The French withdrew all military support for Emperor Maximilian in 1867. Liberal republicans returned to power and executed Maximilian and two Mexican generals supporting his regime. An important liberal military leader against the French and their conservative Mexican collaborators was General Porfirio Díaz. Díaz had political ambitions to become President of Mexico, rebelling twice against civilian presidents, succeeding in 1876. He ruled Mexico continuously from 1884 to 1911, when he was forced from power by Mexican revolutionaries supporting Francisco I. Madero. Although revolutionary forces defeated the Federal Army, Madero demobilized them and retained the federal forces. Madero was overthrown and murdered in a military coup in February 1913. Federal Army General Victoriano Huerta, now president, was challenged by a coalition of revolutionaries in northern Mexico, the Constitutionalist Army and forces led by Emiliano Zapata in the south. The Constitutionalists defeated the Federal Army in July 1914, and it was dissolved. Only revolutionary armies remained, which were not a unified force.

Revolutionary generals were unable to come to a power arrangement after their victory over Huerta, plunging the country into a new stage of civil war. The large-scale conflict largely ended with Constitutionalist General Alvaro Obregón defeating General Pancho Villa in 1915. From 1920 until 1940, revolutionary generals held the presidency of Mexico, with a number of rival generals staging unsuccessful coups. During this same period, these generals, especially Obregón, Plutarco Elías Calles, and Lázaro Cárdenas, systematically downsized the overall size of the armed forces and drastically reduced its share of the national budget, while at the same time creating a professional and largely apolitical junior officer corps. President Manuel Avila Camacho (1940–1946) was the last revolutionary-era general to serve as president, and military coups were a thing of the past. Mexico's armed forces are notable in Latin America for their absence from politics. Mexico's revolutionary military leaders established a culture of civilian supremacy and placed state power in the hands of civilian professional politicians.

Since 2006, the Mexican Armed Forces have assumed greater responsibilities and functions beyond conventional military duties, most notably taking a leading role in the ongoing armed conflict against drug trafficking syndicates. In 2019, the military expanded its law enforcement role through the incorporation of the National Guard, a gendarmerie that essentially succeeded the disbanded Federal Police. As of 2021, close to 250 government functions previously overseen by civilian authorities have been transferred to the military, including regulating maritime communication and transportation, constructing public buildings and facilities, and overseeing tourism companies.

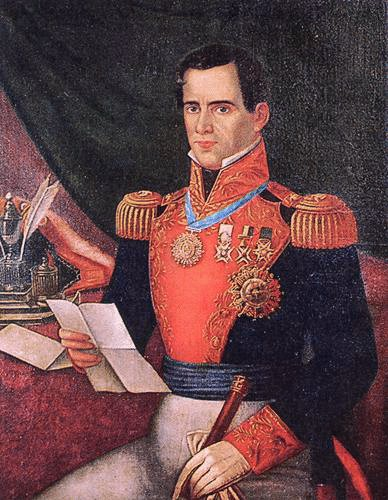
General Antonio López de Santa Anna

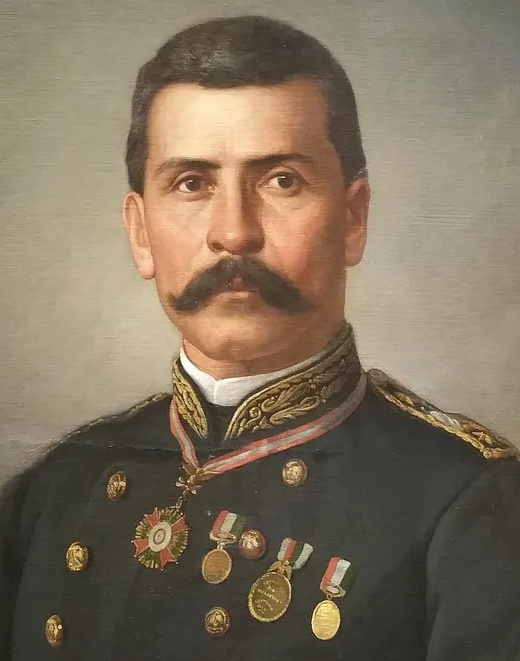
General Porfirio Díaz

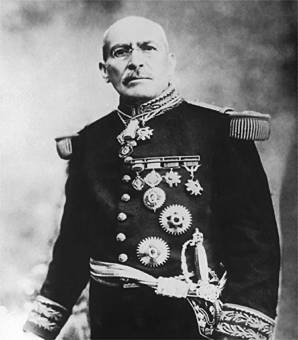
Federal Army General Victoriano Huerta

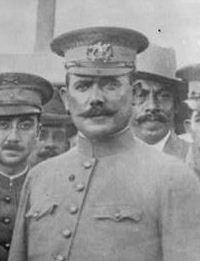
Constitutionalist Army General Alvaro Obregón

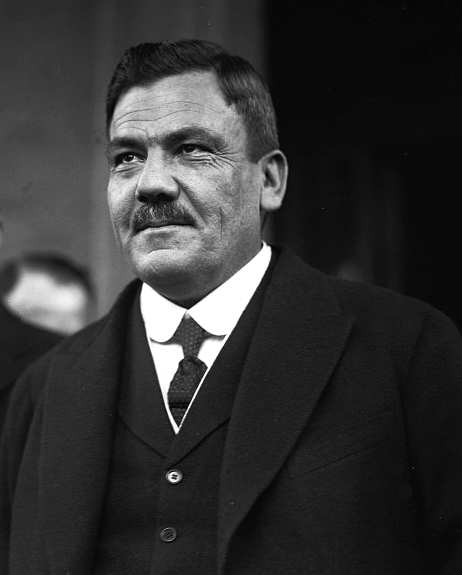
General Plutarco Elías Calles

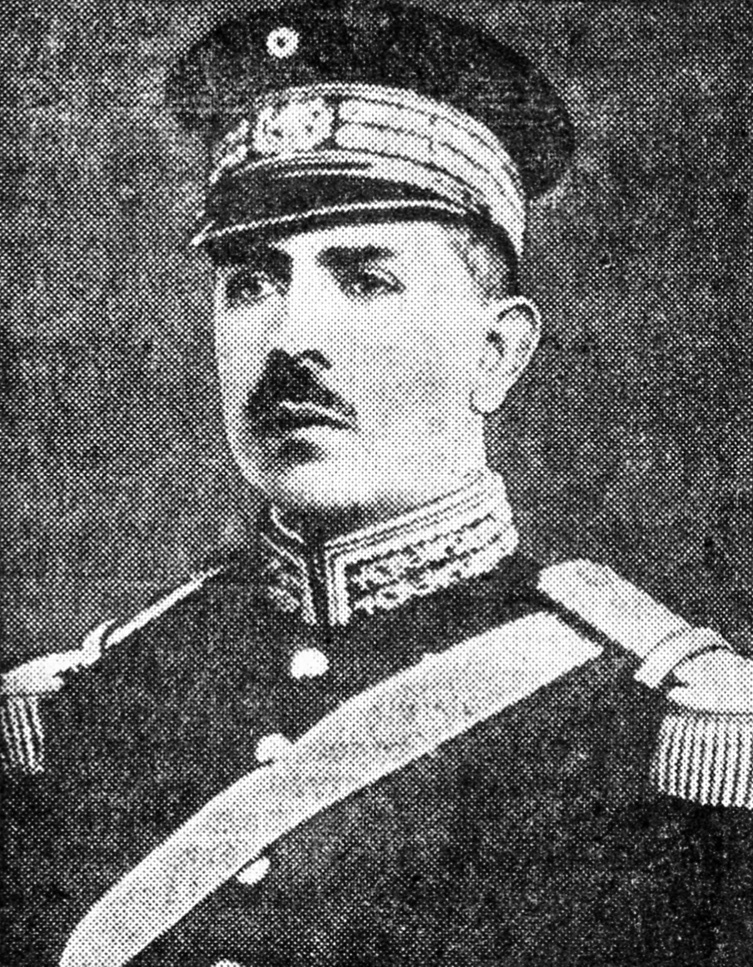
General Lázaro Cárdenas

== Organization ==
=== The Army ===
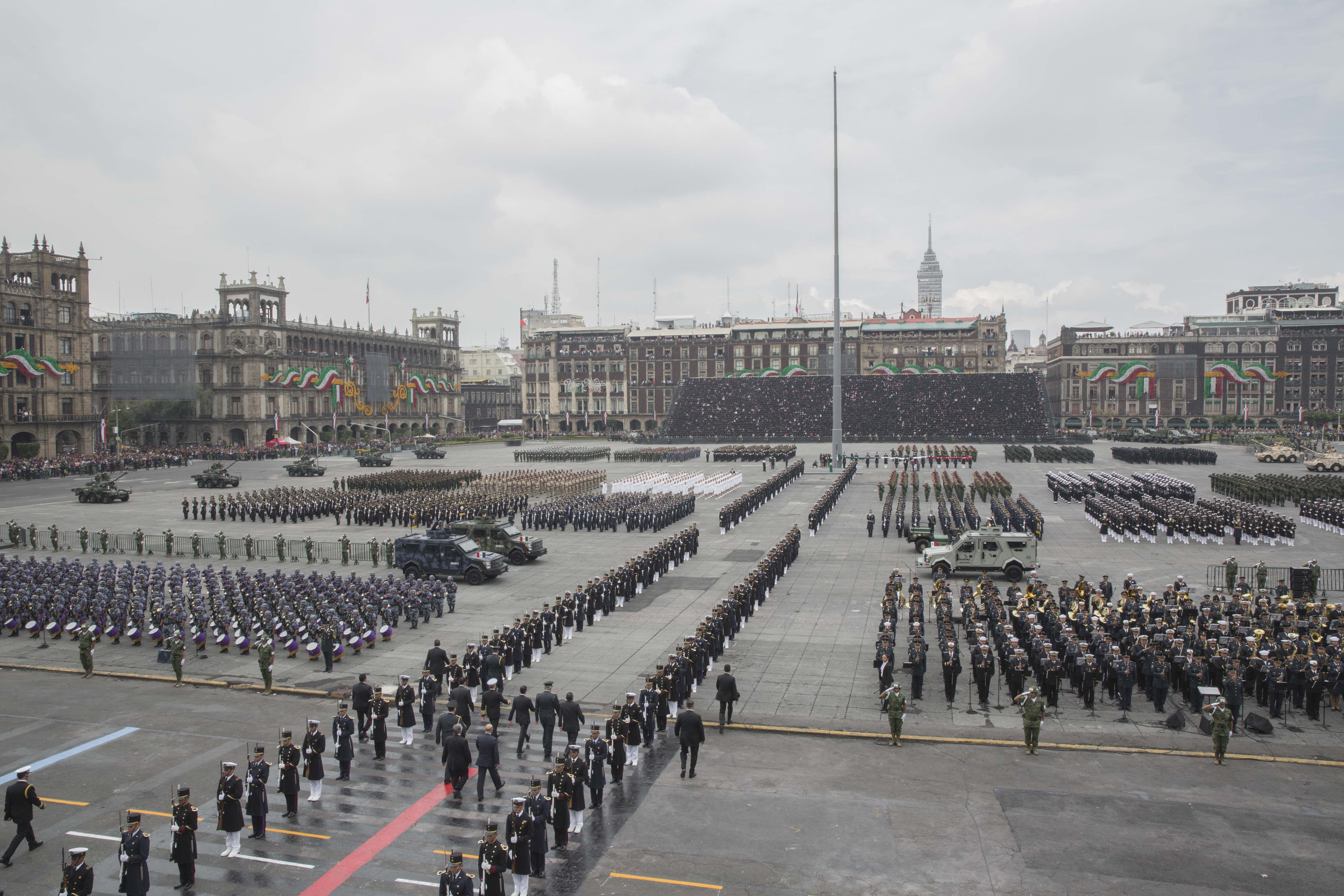
Military parade commemorating the 205th anniversary of the beginning of the Mexican War of Independence.

There are five main components of the Army: a national headquarters, territorial commands, and independent units. The Secretary of National Defense, through the Commanding General of the Army, commands the Army by means of a very centralized system and a large number of general officers. The Army uses a modified continental staff system in its headquarters. The Army is the largest branch of Mexico's armed services.

Presently, there are 12 "Military Regions", which are further broken down into 44 subordinate "Military Zones." In both cases, a numbering system is used for designation. There is no set number of zones within a region, and these can therefore be tailored to meet operational needs, with a corresponding increase or decrease in troop strength.

=== The Air Force ===
The Air Force national headquarters is embedded in the Army headquarters in Mexico City. It also follows the continental staff system, with the usual A1, A2, A3, and A4 sections. The tactical forces form what is loosely called an Air Division, but it is dispersed in four regions: Northeast Mexico, Northwest Mexico, Central Mexico, and Southern Mexico. The Air Force maintains a total of 18 air bases and has the additional capability of opening temporary forward operating bases in austere conditions for some helicopters and light aircraft.

=== The Navy ===
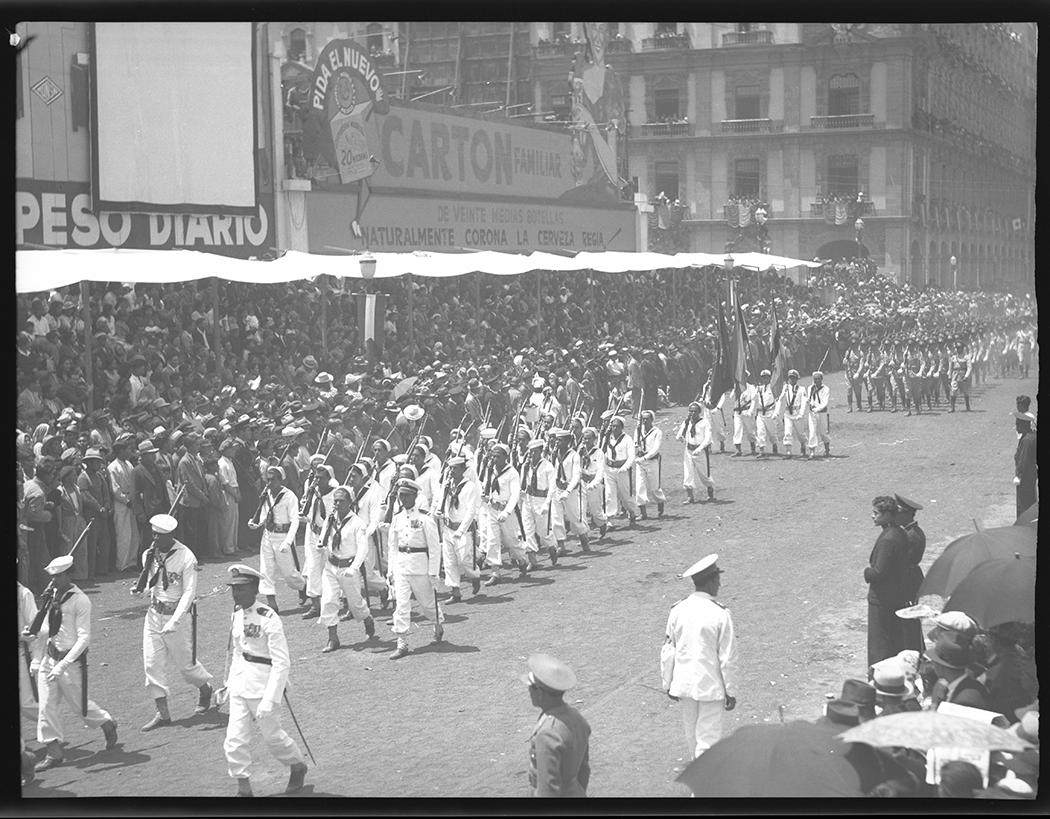
Photo of the Independence Day parade (16 September) in Mexico City at the Museo Archivo de la Fotografía (Museum of the Photographic Archive).

The Secretariat of the Navy, the Navy's national headquarters, is located in Mexico City and is smaller than the Army's headquarters. The "Junta (or Council) of Admirals" plays a unique consultative and advisory role within the headquarters, an indication of the institutional importance placed on seniority and "year groups" that go back to the admirals’ days as cadets in the naval college. They are a very tightly knit group, and great importance is placed on consultation among the factions within these year groups. The Navy's operational forces are organized as two independent groups: the Gulf Force and the Pacific (West) Force. Each group has its own headquarters, a destroyer group, an auxiliary vessel group, a Marine Infantry Group, and a Special Forces group. The Gulf and Pacific Forces are not mirror images of each other, as independence of organization is permitted. Both are subdivided into regions, with Regions 1, 3, and 5 on the Gulf, and 2, 4, and 6 on the Pacific. Each region is further divided into sectors and zones, so a proliferation of headquarters and senior officers exists. The Navy also has an air arm with troop transport, reconnaissance, and surveillance aircraft. The Navy maintains significant infrastructure, including naval dockyards that have the capability of building ships, such as the Holzinger class offshore patrol vessel. These dockyards have a significant employment and economic impact on the country.

=== The Marines ===
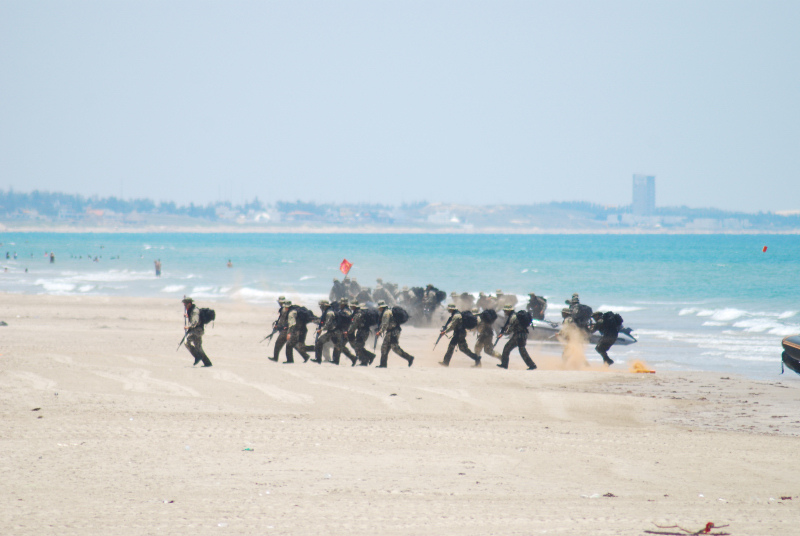
The Mexican Navy commemorate June 1st, National Maritime Day.

The Naval Infantry is the marine corps and amphibious infantry force of the Mexican Navy. The main task of the Infantería de Marina is to guarantee the maritime security of the country's ports and the external and internal defense of the country. To accomplish these responsibilities, the corps is trained and equipped to take on any type of operations from Air, Sea, and Land.

The Naval Infantry Corps was reorganized in 2007–09 into 30 Naval Infantry Battalions, a paratroop battalion, a battalion attached to the Presidential Guard Brigade, two Fast Reaction Forces with six battalions each, and three Special Forces groups. The Naval Infantry is responsible for port security, protection of the ten-kilometer coastal fringe, and patrolling major waterways.

=== The Coast Guard ===
The Mexican Maritime Search and Rescue is the Mexican Navy's SAR Unit, which is responsible for improving the quality and effectiveness of the Navy's response to Mexico's maritime emergencies. The Mexican Navy historically has been responsible for the search and rescue operations using its available resources. However, aware of the importance of safeguarding human life at sea and the growing demand for sea rescue, the High Command of the Navy created the Maritime Search and Rescue unit.

=== Independent service forces ===
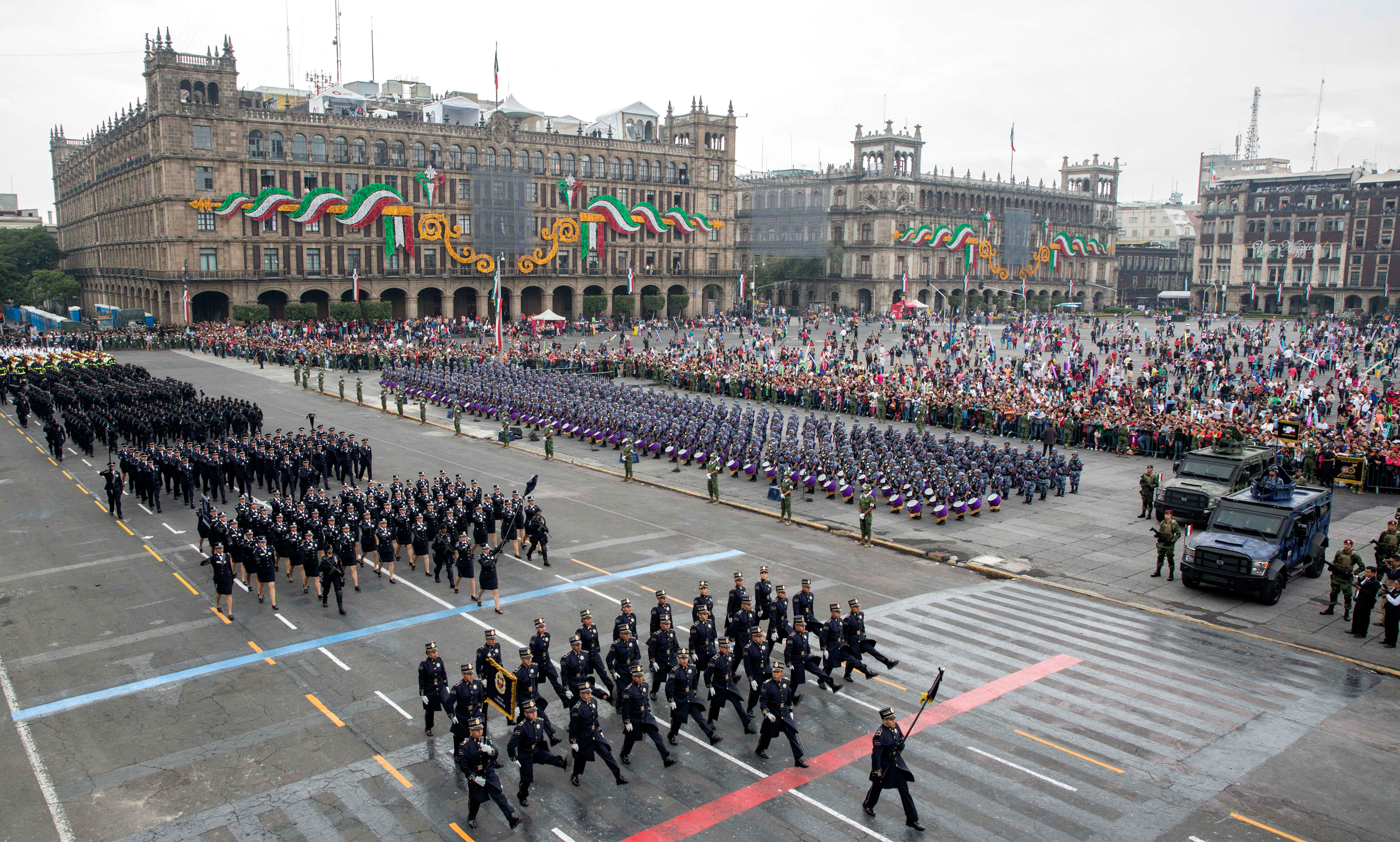
Military parade commemorating the 205th anniversary of the beginning of the Mexican War of Independence.

Several other military formations exist that are organizationally independent of the Army and Navy command structures. Chief among the independent forces is the 1st Army Corps and also formerly the Presidential Guard Corps, under the direct command of the SEDENA, consisting of two mechanized infantry brigades located in Mexico City, plus a motorized brigade, with a full complement of combat and support troops, before it was disbanded and integrated into the regular army units in 2018. In addition, there was previously the Mexican Army Police Corps, before it was merged with the Federal Police to form the National Guard in 2019, and the Army and Naval Special Forces units (1 division and more than 100 independent regional battalions) and an Army airborne parachute brigade of the Aerotrope Corps, partly operating under the command of FEC. All these independent service troops are located in Mexico City, where they act as a ready military reserve and as centers of elite military excellence.

In times of need, a special "Rural Defense Corps" (or "Rurales") plays a role similar to a traditional volunteer militia (organized on an as-needed basis) in the rural communities. Today, Rural Defense teams work with both local law enforcement and the National Guard towards the goal of hindering organized crime and the threat of the drug cartels. President Andrés Manuel López Obrador, in his inaugural message to the Armed Forces on 1 December 2018, officially asked the Congress of the Union to consider reactivating the National Guard of Mexico, as a separate service of the armed forces under the direct control and responsibility of the Secretariats of National Defense and Public Security along similar lines as to the reorganized National Guard in France to contribute to overall national defense and help protect public order and safety. The relevant amendments to the Constitution were approved in March 2019 by both chambers.

=== Leadership ===
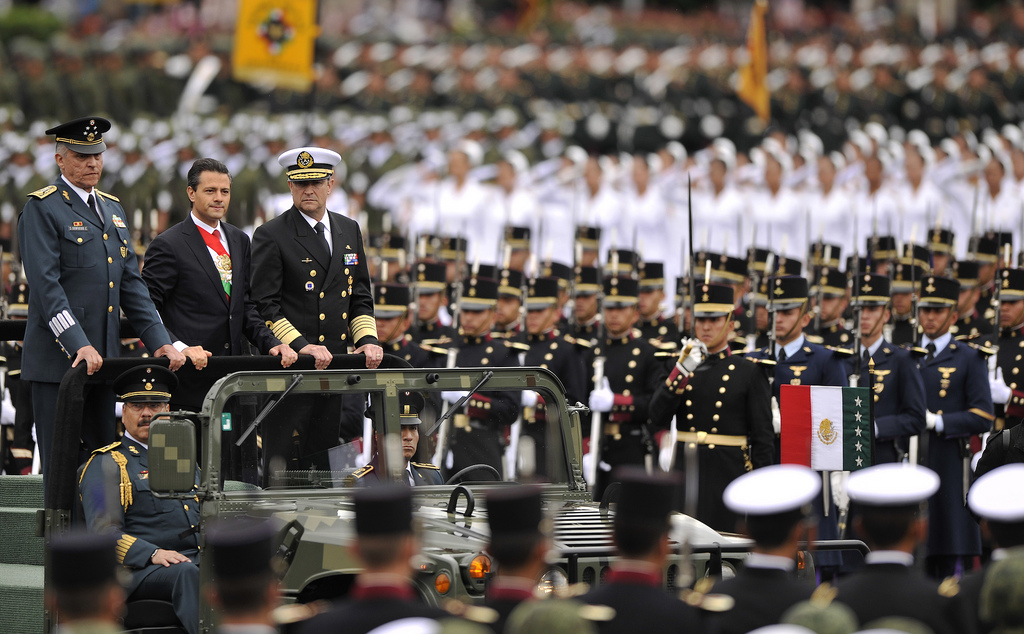
President Enrique Peña Nieto accompanied by the Secretary of National Defense, Salvador Cienfuegos Zepeda, and the Secretary of the Navy, Vidal Francisco Soberón Sanz, during a military parade.

Officially, as there is no Minister of Defense, the Mexican military's two components are not under the command of a single commander except the President, who is Supreme Commander of the Armed Forces (Comandante Supremo De Las Fuerzas Armadas). According to the Constitution of Mexico the President is the Army's only five-star general. This is comparable to most other countries with a presidential system of government, such as the United States. Instead, a Secretary, who is a serving officer—an Army four-star general or a Navy admiral—heads each department and branch (The Secretariats of National Defense and the Navy). Each minister serves in a dual capacity: as a full cabinet member reporting to the President, and as the operational commander of their branch, but because of politics and rank, the Navy is subordinate to the Army.

Moreover, the Air Force commander and his staff are attached to the Secretariat of National Defense; no Air Force officer has risen to the hierarchy's most trusted, senior positions. This subordination has allowed the Army to identify its organization as the "Secretariat of National Defense" (Secretaría de la Defensa Nacional—SEDENA). As a result, the Army chief holds the nominal title of "Secretary of Defense." The President picks the secretaries, who do not have to serve as such for his entire presidential term (sexenio, sexennium, six-year term). During the PRI's single-party rule, ministerial selection was a strict, pro-forma exercise by seniority. However, both Presidents Ernesto Zedillo (1994–2000) and Vicente Fox (2000–06) strayed from precedent and reached down to the junior levels to select "more progressive" officers to lead the forces. The Army and the Navy are regionally organized, with central, national headquarters in Mexico City and subordinate, regional headquarters. Historically, this has proven to be effective because the military's main deployments have been domestic. Troops are stationed throughout the country to serve as a continuing presence of authority and to allow for an immediate critical response. Dispersion by regional military zones has facilitated local recruitment of non-commissioned officers (Army sergeants, Navy petty officers) and enlisted men and women, allowing them to be stationed near family during their military service, an important cultural consideration. On the other hand, mobility is expected of commissioned officers to give them experience, and historically, to prevent any senior officer from remaining too long and becoming a warlord.

== Budget ==
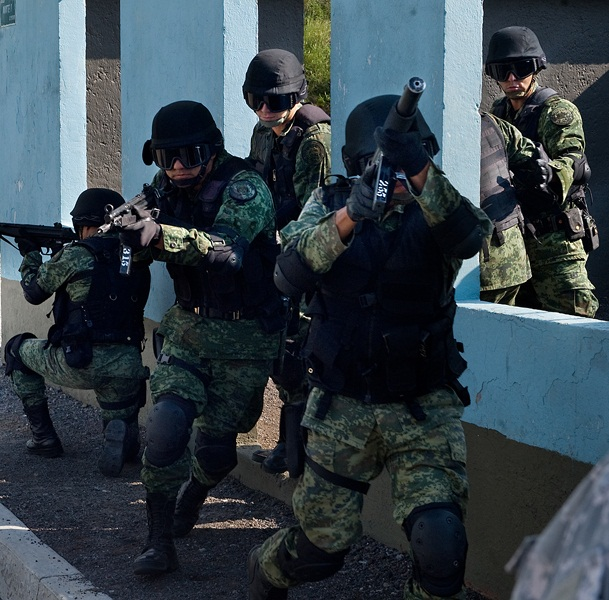
Mexican Army Special Forces.

In 1989, Mexico's military budget was 17 percent of the country's Gross National Product (GNP). In 1999, Mexico's military budget increased to 0.9 percent of its GDP, to US$4.0 billion. Since the year 2000, however, with the economic boost that the country has experienced, the defense budget was decreased to 0.5 percent of the GDP, and in 2007 had an annual expenditure of US$4 billion. Since President Calderón assumed office in December 2006, he has submitted legislation increasing the budget to fight the peace operations in several countries. In 2012, Mexico spent US$7.1 billion on its military, amounting to 0.6 percent of GDP.

Since 2012, Mexico has spent over US$3 billion in equipment purchases as part of a modernization effort, including the purchase of Blackhawk helicopters.

== Mission ==
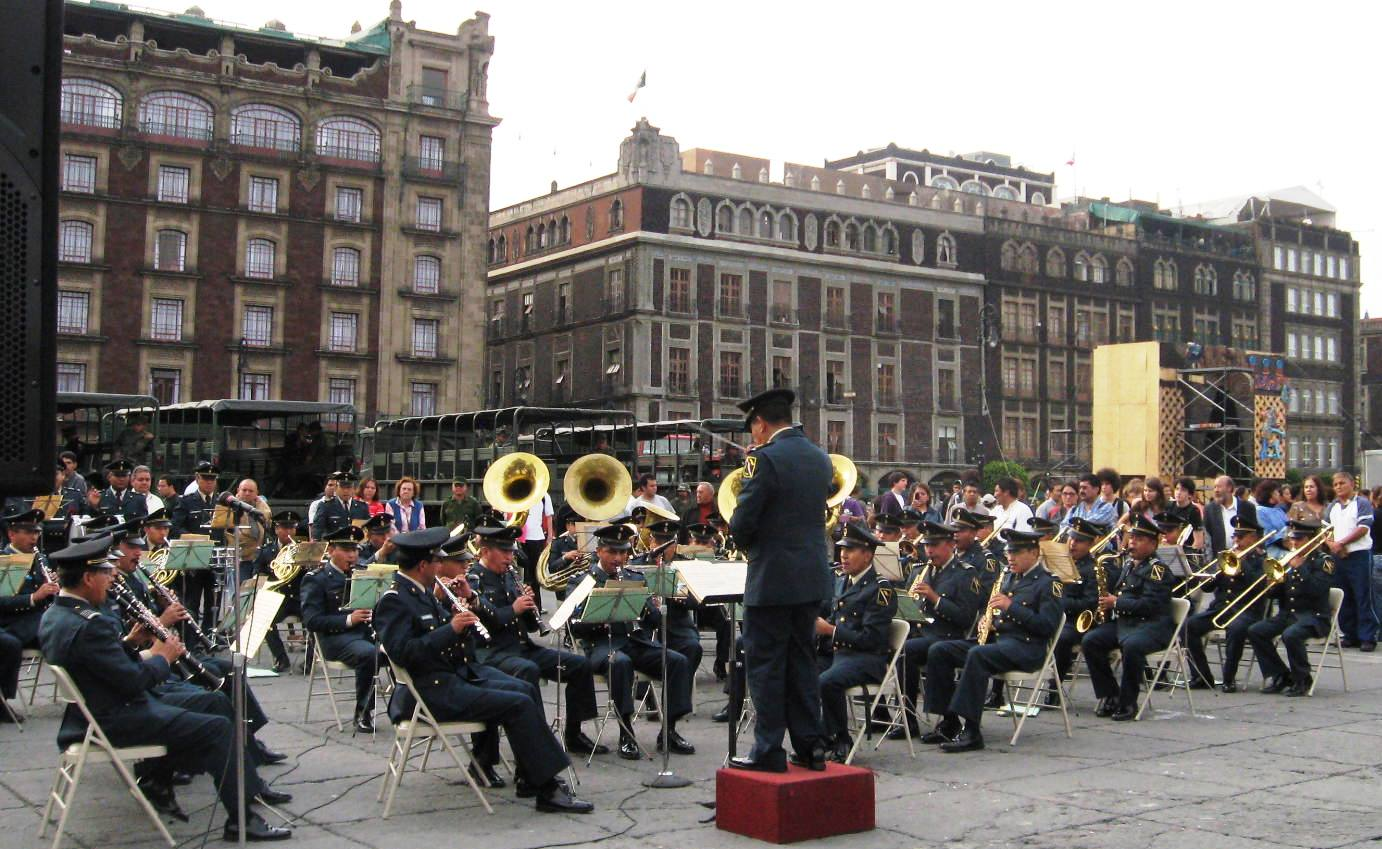
A Mexican army band performs in the Zócalo.

The Mexican Army works around three preparedness missions, or plans:

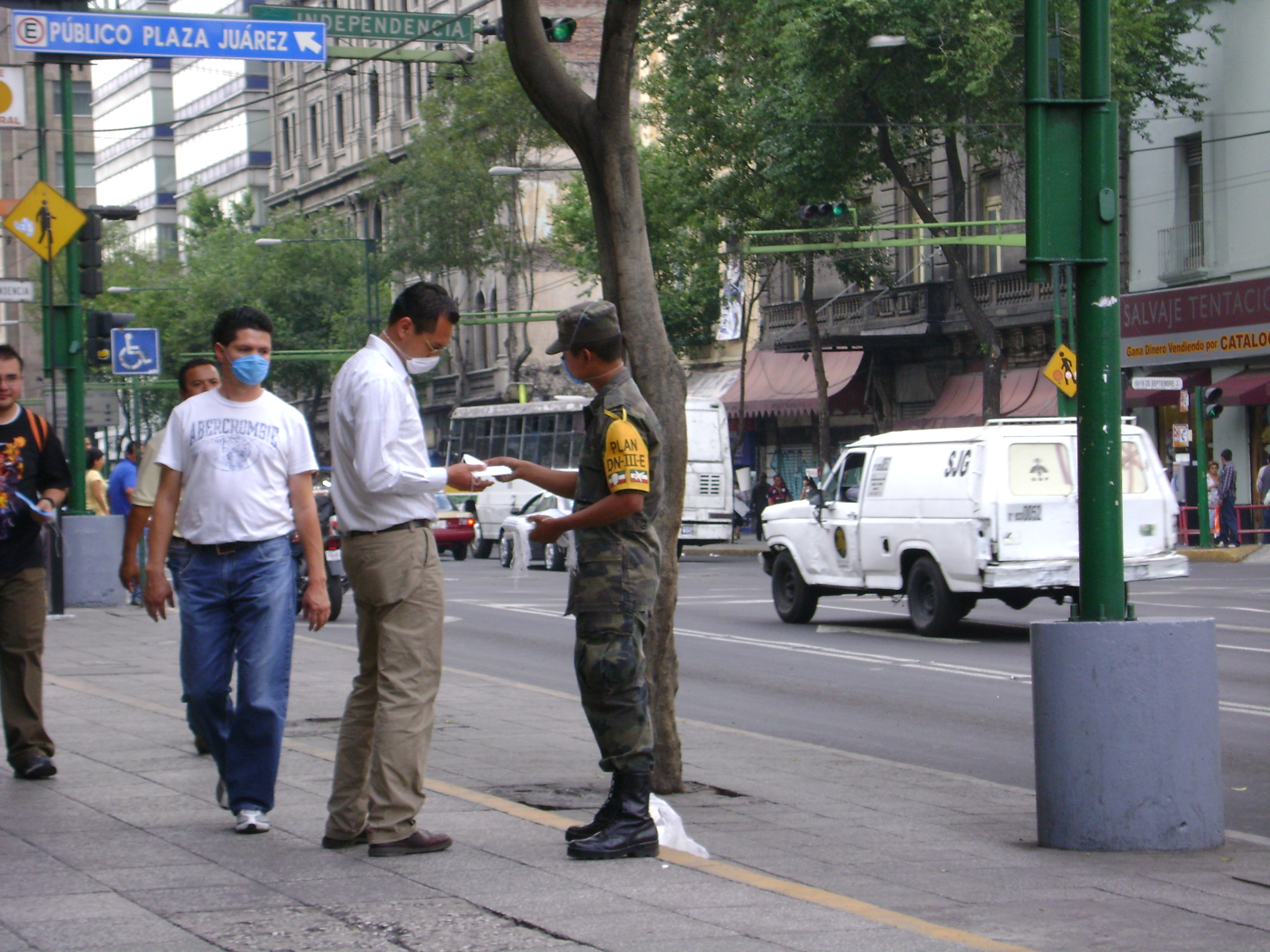
A Mexican soldier wearing the identification of Plan DN-III-E, hands out masks to citizens during the 2009 flu pandemic.

DN1: Preparation of the military forces to repel external aggressions. No military armed force can leave Mexican territory without a declaration of war and approval of Congress. The last time this was invoked was in 1942, to send an expeditionary force to the Philippines, after war was declared against Germany and Japan, following the sinking of two Mexican ships by U-boats. In 1990, President Carlos Salinas de Gortari asked the permission from Congress to send troops to the Gulf War, but it was refused, since there was no declaration of war against Iraq.

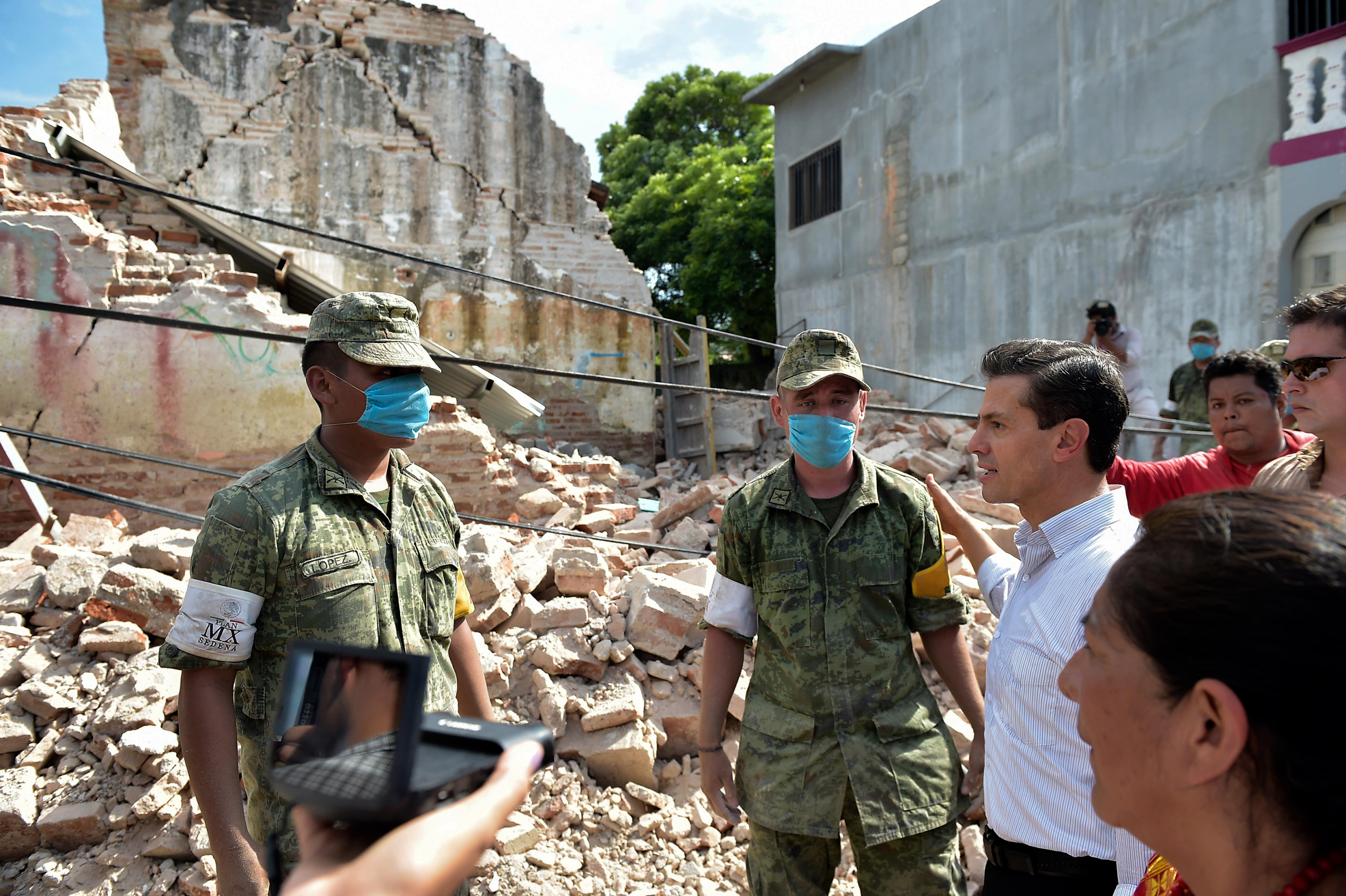
The president of Mexico, Enrique Peña Nieto, visit Juchitán, after the 2017 Chiapas earthquake.

DN2: Preparation of the military forces to protect the internal security of the country. This would include police actions against guerrilla forces, counter-drug operations, and, originally, political control. Up until 1970, the Mexican Army was used as a repressive force to maintain the virtual PRI dictatorship. The most controversial use of the military was the Dirty War in the 1960s, which included the 1968 Tlatelolco massacre of students and unsuspecting bystanders. After 1980, these operations nearly entirely ceased (see EZLN).

DN3: (Defense against natural disasters). The Army should always be ready to help the civil population in case of disaster. This includes preventive measures. For example, between August and November, military forces are sent to Mexican coastal areas to aid the public in the event of hurricanes or floods. For the Mexican people, the DN3 plan is the most important peacetime operation of the Army. The Army provides food, shelter, medicine, and medical services to the people who need them. This also includes the reconstruction of roads and communication services. Because calling the implementation DN3 plan is an acceptance of severe problems, the DN3 plan was not invoked in the 1985 Mexico City earthquake that left large areas of Mexico City in ruins, since the authorities did not want to recognize there was an emergency in the capital, while the army was called to the city, it was just a peacekeeping force. This later became a severe questioning of the government. The Mexican Army provided aid to the US following Hurricane Katrina. More recently, the DN3 plan was invoked in 2009 when an epidemic of swine flu threatened the population, and in 2010 after the states of Veracruz, Tabasco, Nuevo León, Chiapas, Oaxaca, and Guerrero were severely affected by floods caused by several hurricanes and tropical storms.

== Personnel ==
=== Officers ===
Officer candidates for the three services are trained in military colleges: Mexico City for the Army, Veracruz for the Navy, Guadalajara and Jalisco for the Air Force.

=== Career soldiers ===
Mexican citizens who have chosen to be career soldiers are signed for an initial 3-year contract and, at the end of it, are encouraged to sign for another 2-year contract. If they choose to do so, this 2nd term would become final, unless they undertake mandatory exams and tests to become corporals, or apply to study in any of the available Military Specialist Technical Schools, or for sergeant at the E.M.C.A. (Escuela Militar de Clases de las Armas).

=== Conscript soldiers ===
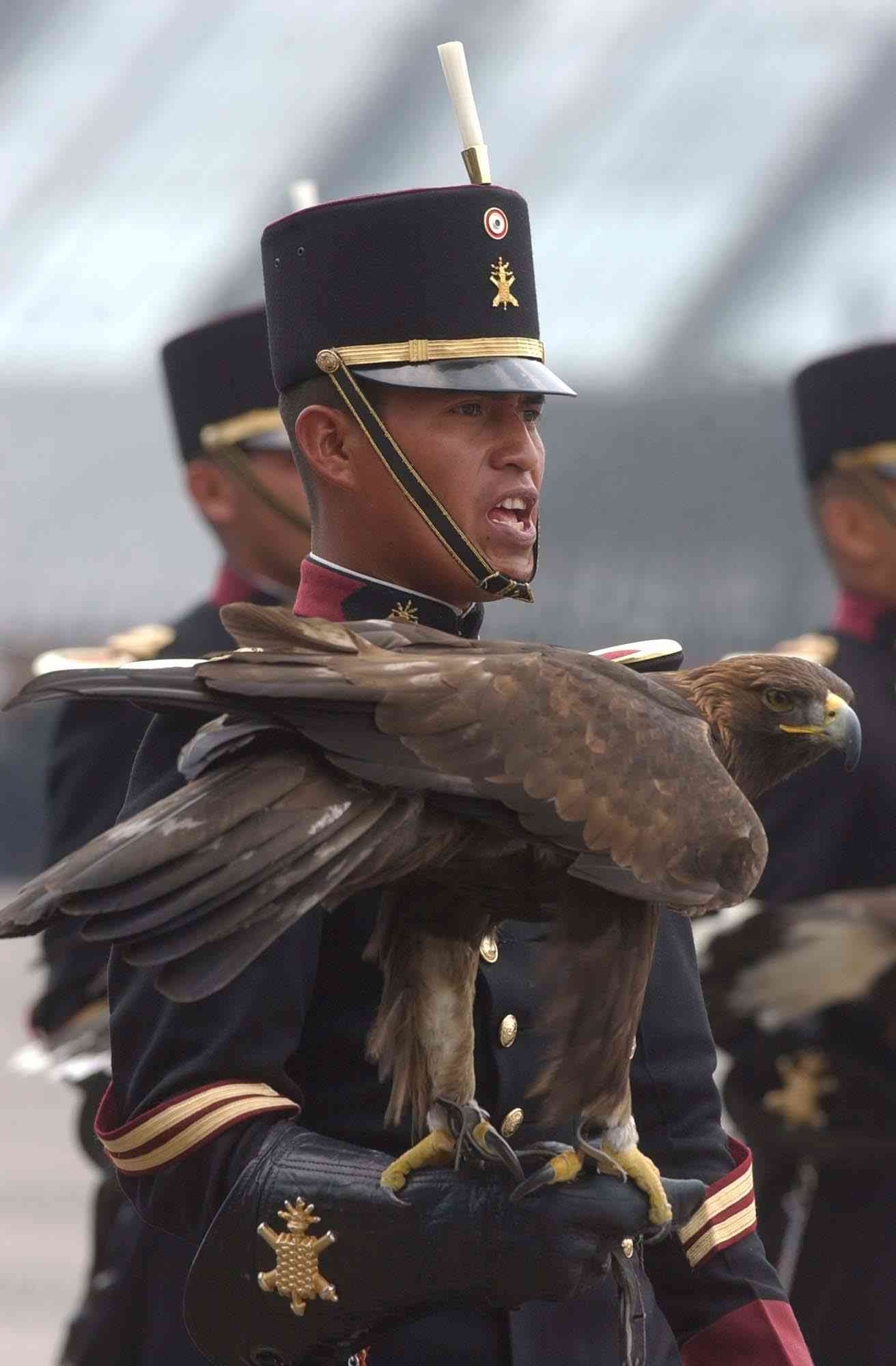
Infantry Sergeant Cadet 2nd class, holding a golden eagle like that depicted in the Heroic Military Academy coat of arms.

The armed forces are generally made up of professionals. Military service age and obligation as of 2012: compulsory military service age is 18 years; conscript service obligation is 12 months; conscripts serve only in the Army; Navy and Air Force service is all voluntary. Women are eligible for voluntary military service. Legally, every Mexican man is obligated to a year of military service consisting of a few hours of drill or social services on weekends, not true military training. Most conscripts will have received at most only one marksmanship session at a rifle range by the time they have completed their service and are not integrated nor operate with regular army units.

=== National military service ===
The drafted men attend and participate in weekend sessions, which are of a social service nature, with an emphasis being placed on education, history, physical fitness, and military discipline for one complete year. Afterward, the precartilla (pre-military identity card) is returned to the conscript with an added page certifying his status as having fulfilled his national military service and identifies the military branch, the unit, rank, etc. The document then acquires full status as the Cartilla del Servicio Militar Nacional (Military National Service Identity Card), informally Cartilla; this status is recorded in the National Defense and Navy Secretariats' files. This document (Military National Service Identity Card) is an important form of Mexican national identification, and its existence was formerly always requested by private and public employers; however, this identity document has ceased being required for obtaining a passport for travelling abroad.

== Military law ==
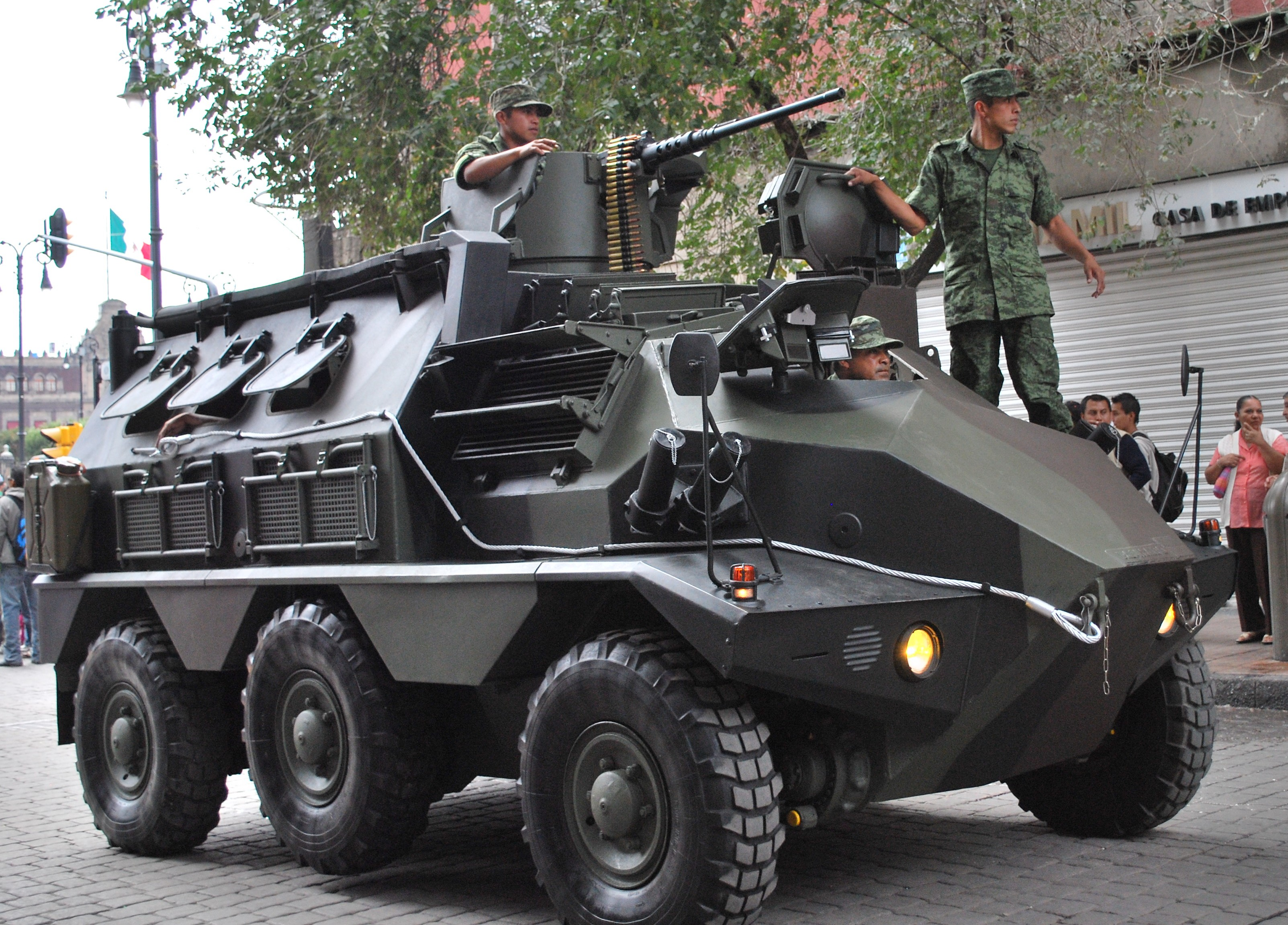
Armored Personnel Carrier VCR-TT 6X6 on Madero Street in downtown Mexico City after Independence Day celebrations.

As the President of Mexico is Commander in Chief of the armed forces, the chain of command and military discipline are subordinated to civilian control. Article 13 of the Mexican Constitution specifically provides for military jurisdiction over all military crime and discipline; military tribunals execute jurisdiction over military personnel, per the Uniform Code of Military Justice (UCMJ).

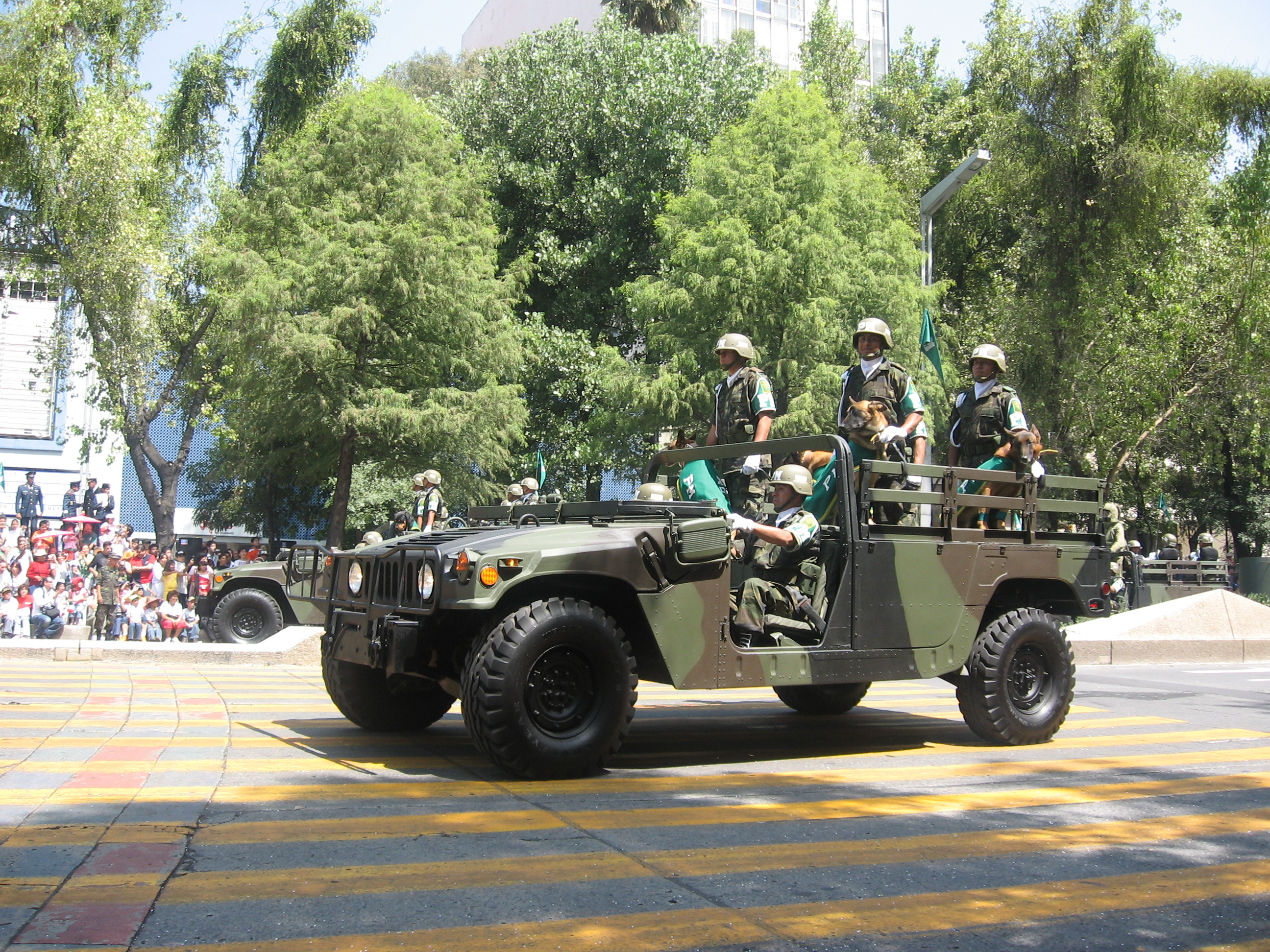
Mexican army HMMWV

Regarding military personnel labor conditions, discipline, and the chain of command as fundamental to the military, Article 123-B establishes: "Military and naval personnel and members of the public security corps, and personnel of the foreign service, shall be governed by their own laws."

Under federal law, the general missions of the Mexican Armed Forces are to defend national integrity, independence, and sovereignty; guarantee internal security; attend to the public needs of the civilian population; advance the country’s progress through civic actions and social projects; and, in the case of a disaster, to maintain public order, help people in need and protect their possessions, and reconstruct affected zones. Owing to this broad mandate, the military has been involved in a wide range of activities, including operating public health campaigns, constructing public works, managing public facilities, and administering customs and border enforcement.

== Activities outside Mexico ==
=== United Nations peacekeeping ===
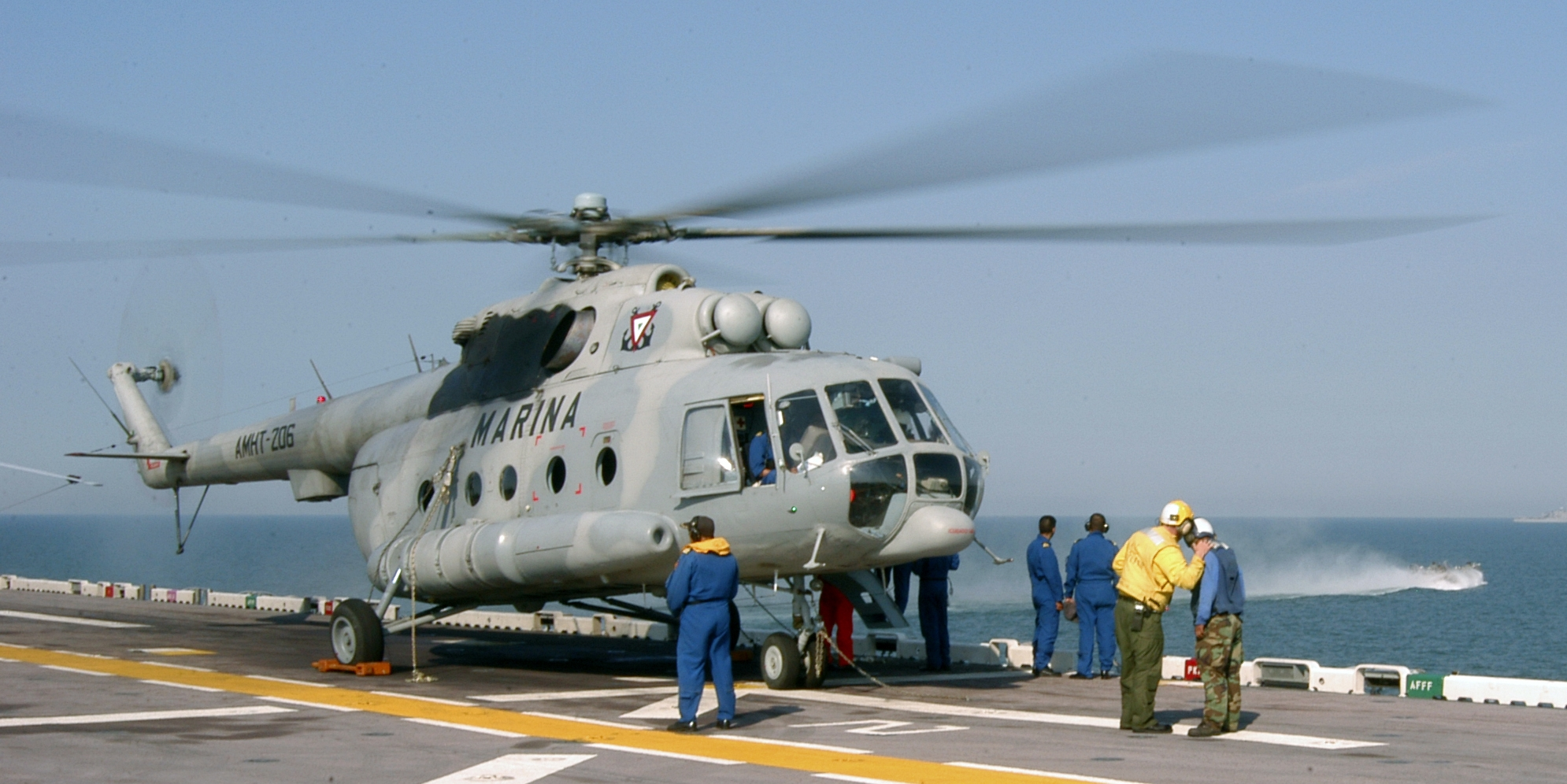
Mexican Navy Mi-17

As of 2005, intervention in UN peacekeeping operations began being discussed, with strong resistance from some members of Congress. However, in 2016 the first group of the Mexican Armed Forces joined MINUSTAH, the UN mission in Haiti: three officers (one from each service) as members of the mission's HQ, and two officers and one NCO attached to the Chilean battalion, by an agreement between the two countries. Mexican authorities have expressed their interest in increasing their participation in the future.

=== Natural disaster relief ===
The Mexican Armed Forces have been deployed to several Central American nations to provide disaster relief, and most recently, to Indonesia after the tsunami disaster; only military support personnel were deployed, though, not combat forces. This includes the relief efforts in New Orleans after Hurricane Katrina. This was the first time the Mexican Army officially entered its former territory since the Mexican-American War. Mexican relief efforts were concentrated at New Orleans and Texas in the United States.

== See also ==
- Brigada de Fusileros Paracaidistas
- Fuerzas Especiales
- Cuerpo de Fuerzas Especiales
- Grupo Aeromóvil de Fuerzas Especiales del Alto Mando
- Ixtoc-Alfa
- Mexican response to Hurricane Katrina
- Mexican Special Forces
