= Barra del Tordo =

Coastal land feature in Mexico

Coordinates: 22.89°N 97.76°W

Barra del Tordo is a coastal land feature in Tamaulipas located along the San Rafael River. It has an area of 6,652 hectares (16,440 acres). Environments on the feature include tropical deciduous forest, scrubland, pasture, beach, and marshes. The beach serves as a natural habitat for Kemp's ridley sea turtle. Barra del Tordo is a breakpoint for tropical cyclone watches and warnings used by the National Hurricane Center of the United States.
