= Duncan Canal (Louisiana) =

Coordinates: 30°01′46″N 90°16′47″W

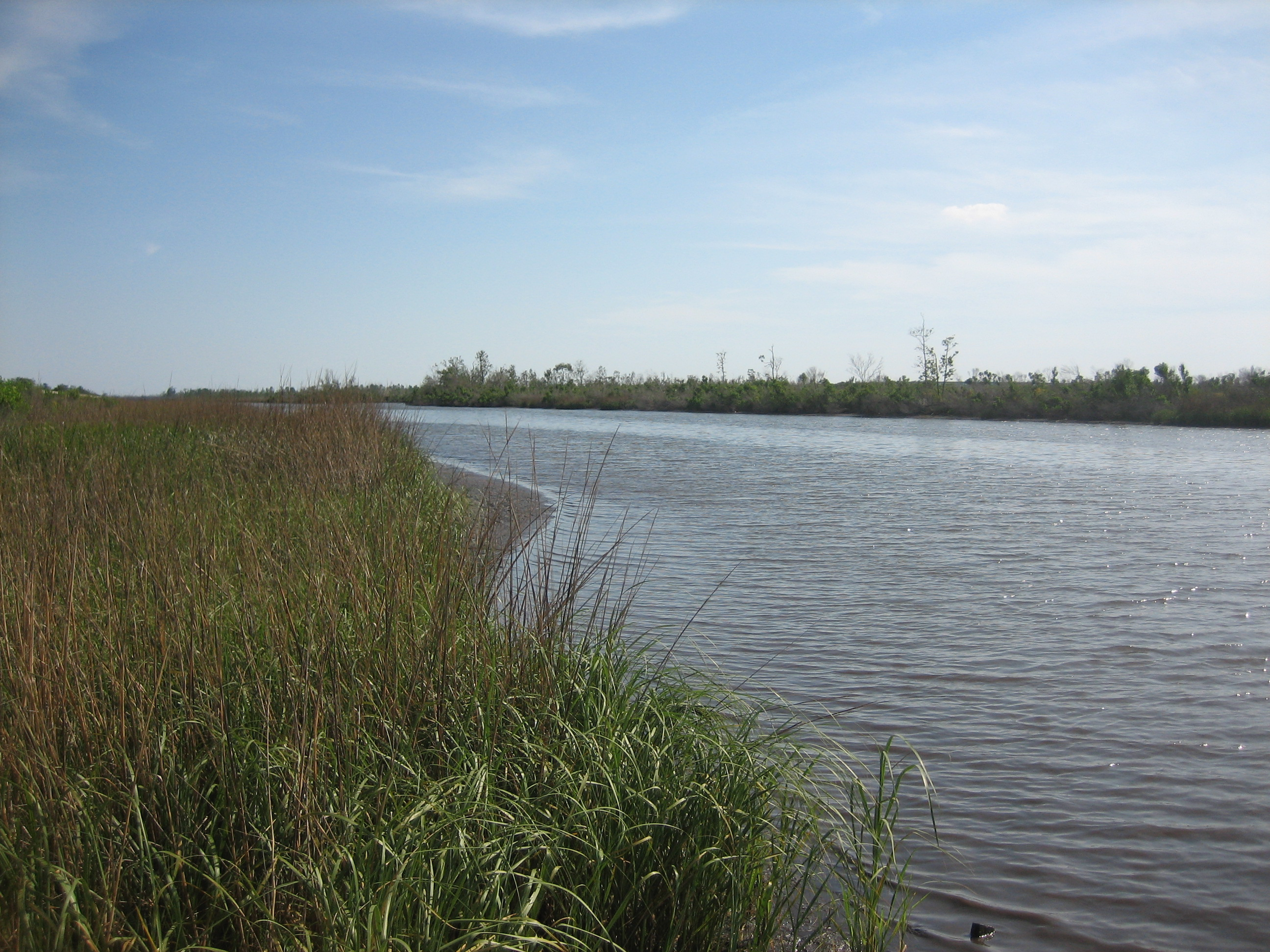
Duncan Canal, from Kenner side

The Duncan Canal, also known as the West Return Canal, is a canal in Louisiana, running along a sizable portion of the boundary between Jefferson Parish, Louisiana and St. Charles Parish, Louisiana. The primary purpose of the canal is drainage; a series of pumps and feeder canals feed a portion of the rain and ground water of the East Bank of Jefferson into the canal which drains it into Lake Pontchartrain. The city of Kenner, Louisiana is on the Jefferson, or eastern, side. For most of the canal's distance, the area on the St. Charles Parish side is undeveloped swamp. A levee topped with a concrete flood wall runs along the Jefferson side.
