= Mexican special forces =

Special Operations units of the Mexican Army and Navy

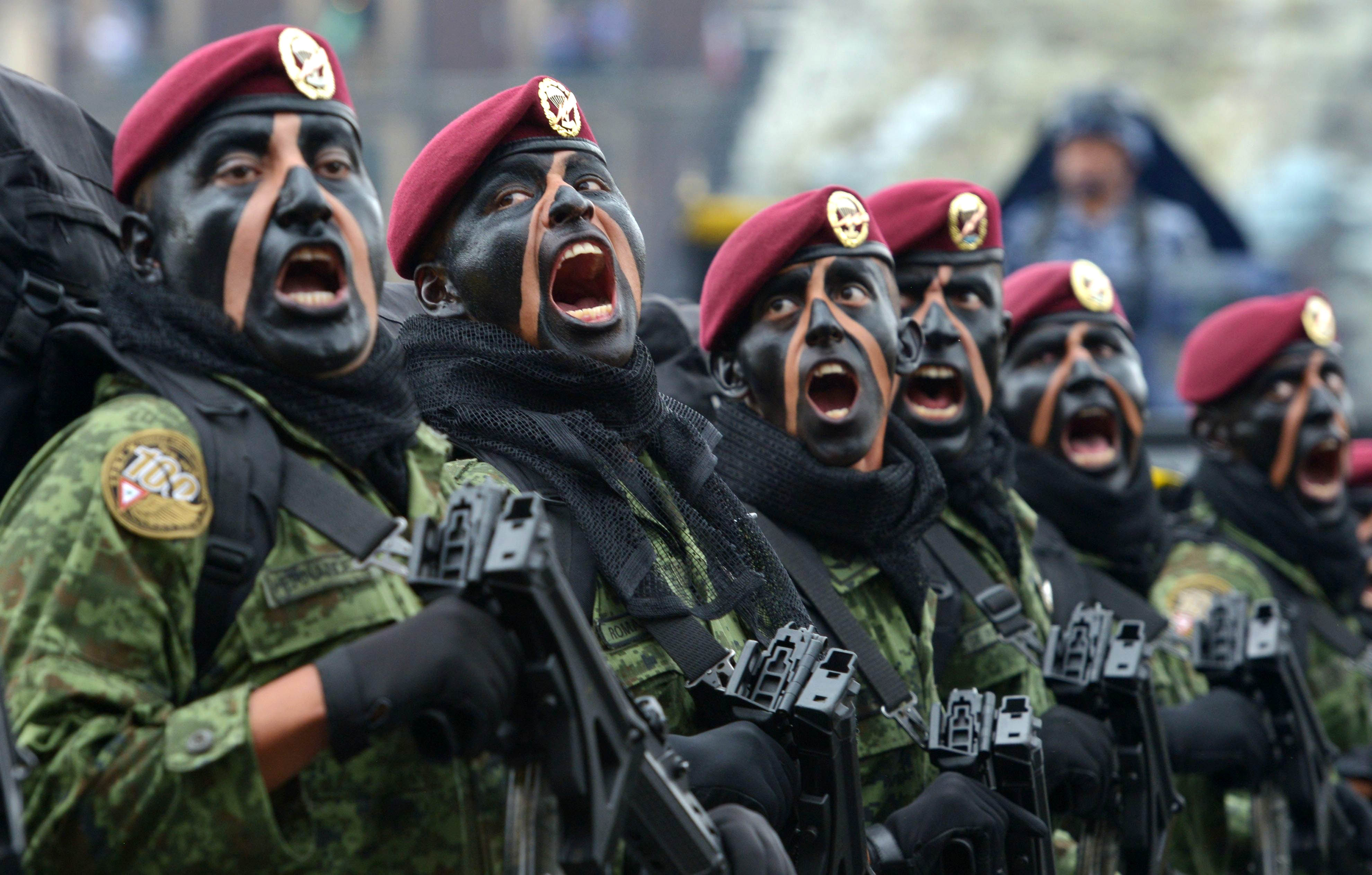
Mexican Army Special Forces during the 2015 September 16 military parade in the Zócalo.

In Mexico, both the army and navy have special forces groups or elite units.

== Army Special Forces ==
The Army has a Special Forces Corps unified command consisting of three special forces brigades, a High Command GAFE (Grupo Aeromóvil de Fuerzas Especiales) group, a GAFE group assigned to the Airborne Brigade - 74 independent Special Forces Battalions, and 36 Amphibious Special Forces Groups.

The Special Forces Brigades are formed by nine SF battalions. The First Brigade has the 1st, 2nd and 3rd SF Battalions. The Second Brigade has the 5th, 6th, 7th and 8th Battalions, while the Third Brigade has the 4th Battalions, 9th Battalions and a Rapid Intervention Force group.

The High Command GAFE is a company sized formation with no more than 150 members who are specially trained in counter-terrorist tactics. They receive orders directly from the Secretary of National Defense.

The Amphibious Special Forces Groups are trained in amphibious warfare. They give the army special capabilities on coastal and swampland operations.

== Navy Special Forces ==
The Navy has a special operations force called Fuerzas Especiales, better known as FES. Their specialties are unconventional warfare, assault, counter-terrorism, and special reconnaissance operations.

There is also another special forces unit called Batallones de Comandos Anfibios. These units carry out special tasks for the Amphibious Reaction Forces (Marines). They are known to train with their American counterparts: the Navy SEALs, at the Naval Special Warfare Center in Coronado, California.

== See also ==
- Fuerzas Especiales
- Grupo Aeromóvil de Fuerzas Especiales
- Grupo Aeromóvil de Fuerzas Especiales del Alto Mando
