= Cuerpo de Fuerzas Especiales =

Special Forces Corps
- Cuerpo de Fuerzas Especiales de México
- Special Forces Corp 5th Battalion Shoulder Patch
- Active: 1986 – present
- Country: Mexico
- Branch: Mexican Army
- Type: Special operations force
- Size: ~ 3,400
- Mottos: "La fortaleza del hombre radica en el dominio de su mente, su grandeza se conoce por la humildad de su espíritu, la honradez de su alma y su voluntad de vencer" English: "The strength of man lies in the control of his mind, his greatness is known by the humility of his spirit, the honesty of his soul and his will to win".
- Engagements: Chiapas conflict; Mexican drug war; Battle of Culiacán

Commanders
- Current commander: Classified

The Special Forces Corps (Spanish: Cuerpo de Fuerzas Especiales) are the special forces battalions of the Mexican Army. Formerly the Special Forces Airmobile Group (Grupo Aeromóvil de Fuerzas Especiales) or GAFE, the SF corps has six regular battalions; one specialized units, Fuerza Especial de Reaccion; the motto of the SF Corps is Todo por México ('All For Mexico').

Within the SF Corps, there are regular, intermediate, and veteran -service troops. The regular-service soldiers usually operate as light infantry. The intermediate and veteran-service soldiers (officers and sergeants) usually are instructors known as COFE or CSFE. Most of the veteran-service soldiers of the Fuerzas Especiales del Alto Mando (FEs High Command) handle black-ops missions.

== History ==
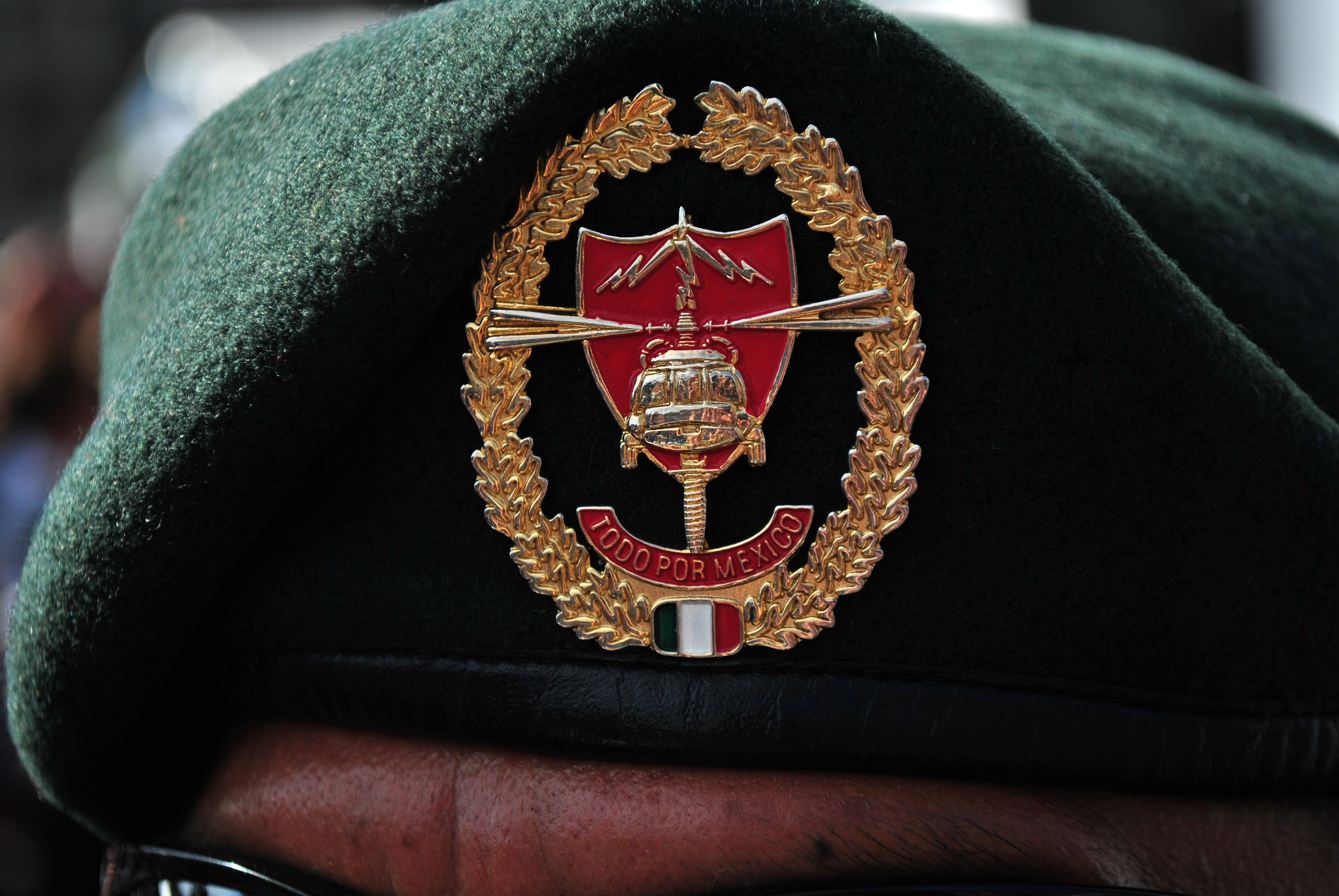
Official Cuerpo de Fuerzas Especiales green beret

GAFE was created in 1986 as the "Fuerza de Intervención Rápida" (Rapid Intervention Force) to provide security for the FIFA World Cup games in Mexico City. France's GIGN trained the group in special weapons and counter-terrorism tactics. On 1 June 1990, the group adopted its most known name, GAFE, becoming a Corps (with division-sized formation) in 2013 as part of the expansion of the Army. It again changed its name from GAFE to Special Forces Corps in 2004.

Eight years later (in 1994) the GAFEs saw action fighting EZLN guerrillas in Chiapas. There is scant public information about the operations in which they participated during that conflict. During the 1990s, the GAFE reportedly received training in commando and urban warfare from Israeli Sayerets and US Army Special Forces, which included training in rapid deployment, marksmanship, ambushes, counter-surveillance and the art of intimidation. It is also known that at some point several members were trained in the infamous US Army School of the Americas, in enhanced interrogation techniques and psychological warfare (Psy-Ops).

The army special forces have continued operations against drug cartels in Mexico, including the capture of drug cartel leaders such as Benjamin Arellano Felix of the Tijuana Cartel, Carlos Rosales Mendoza of La Familia Cartel, and Osiel Cardenas Guillen of the Gulf Cartel.

=== Controversies ===
In 1994 the EZLN guerrilla seized several towns across the southern state of Chiapas. The Mexican government sent in "GAFEs" to put down the insurgents. Within hours, 30 rebels were killed and others were captured. Later their bodies were disposed on a riverbank – with their ears and noses sliced off.

In 1996, about 34 GAFE defectors were recruited to join the Gulf Cartel, serving as the cartel's armed wing - which became known as Los Zetas. This group also recruited national and foreign military personnel (like U.S. Army soldiers and Guatemalan Kaibiles), corrupt police officers and street gang members, and used their knowledge of torture and psychological warfare to terrorize their rivals and innocent civilians alike. By 2011 only 10 of the original 34 zetas remained fugitives. Most of them have been killed or captured by Mexican Special Forces.

It is alleged that on 2 October 2013 during a demonstration by so-called "anarchist youth groups" to protest against the Mexican President and to commemorate the 1968 Tlatelolco student massacre, undercover GAFEs worked as agents provocateurs to disrupt the march and cause the riot police to crush it.

== Training ==
Since its creation they have received a wide variety of training from different special forces groups from around the world (including the French GIGN, Israeli Sayeret and American Green Berets). The Army unified all the knowledge by creating in 1998 the Escuela Militar de Fuerzas Especiales (En. Special Forces Military School). This became the "Centro de Adiestramiento de Fuerzas Especiales" (Special Forces Training Center), located in the foothills of the Iztaccíhuatl volcano, on 1 May 2002. The basic special forces course lasts 6 months.

- Special Forces Instructors' Officers Course (Curso de Oficiales Instructores de las Fuerzas Especiales – COIFE)
- Ranks Officers Training of Special Forces (CACFE)
- Specialized Training for Special Forces Instructors and Officers (Curso Avanzado de Instructores de Fuerzas Especiales – CAIFE)

=== Training scenarios ===
- Jungle/Amphibious/Combat Diving: Jungle and Amphibious Operations Training Center, Xtomoc, Quintana Roo. Training also takes place in different scenarios in the state of Guerrero.
- Urban/Intervention: San Miguel de los Jagueyes, La Casa de la Muerte in Puebla and Temamatla, Estado de México.
- Mountain: El Salto, Durango, and Guerrero.
- Desert Operations Training Center: Laguna Salada and Baja California
- Airmobile/Airborne: Air Force base of Santa Lucía, Estado de México and Guerrero.
- High mountain: Nevado de Toluca, Iztaccíhuatl and Pico de Orizaba volcanoes.

=== Organization ===
The CFE proper, reporting to the SEDENA in Mexico City, is headquartered in Temamatla, Mexico and is divided into:

- 1st SF Battalion
- 2nd SF Battalion
- 3rd SF Battalion
- 4th SF Battalion
- 5th SF Battalion
- 6th SF Battalion (Sonora, México)

== Transportation ==
- UH-60 Black Hawk, Mil Mi-17, CH-53 Yas'ur 2000, MD 530F, Bell 212 and Bell 412 helicopters.
- Fast Attack Vehicle/Light Strike Vehicle, Humvee, customized Dodge Ram pickup trucks, all-terrain vehicles, Plasan Sand Cat, off-road motorcycles and inflatable/fast boats.

== See also ==
- Grupo Aeromóvil de Fuerzas Especiales del Alto Mando
- Fuerzas Especiales
- Brigada de Fusileros Paracaidistas
- Mexican Special Forces
- Grupo de Operaciones Especiales (Mexico)
- Los Zetas
