= September 16 military parade =

Largest parade in Mexico

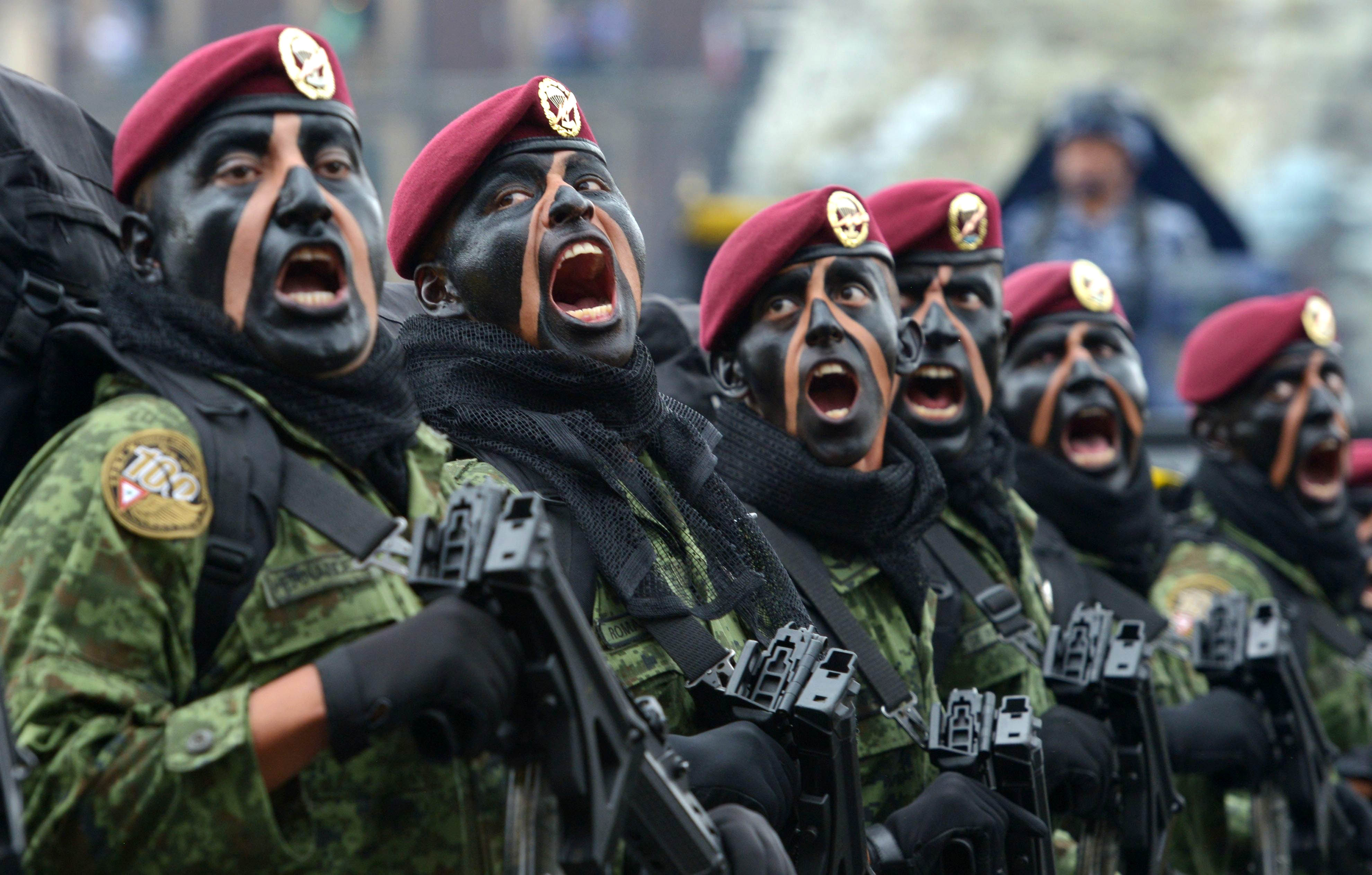
Mexican Special Forces during the 2015 parade.

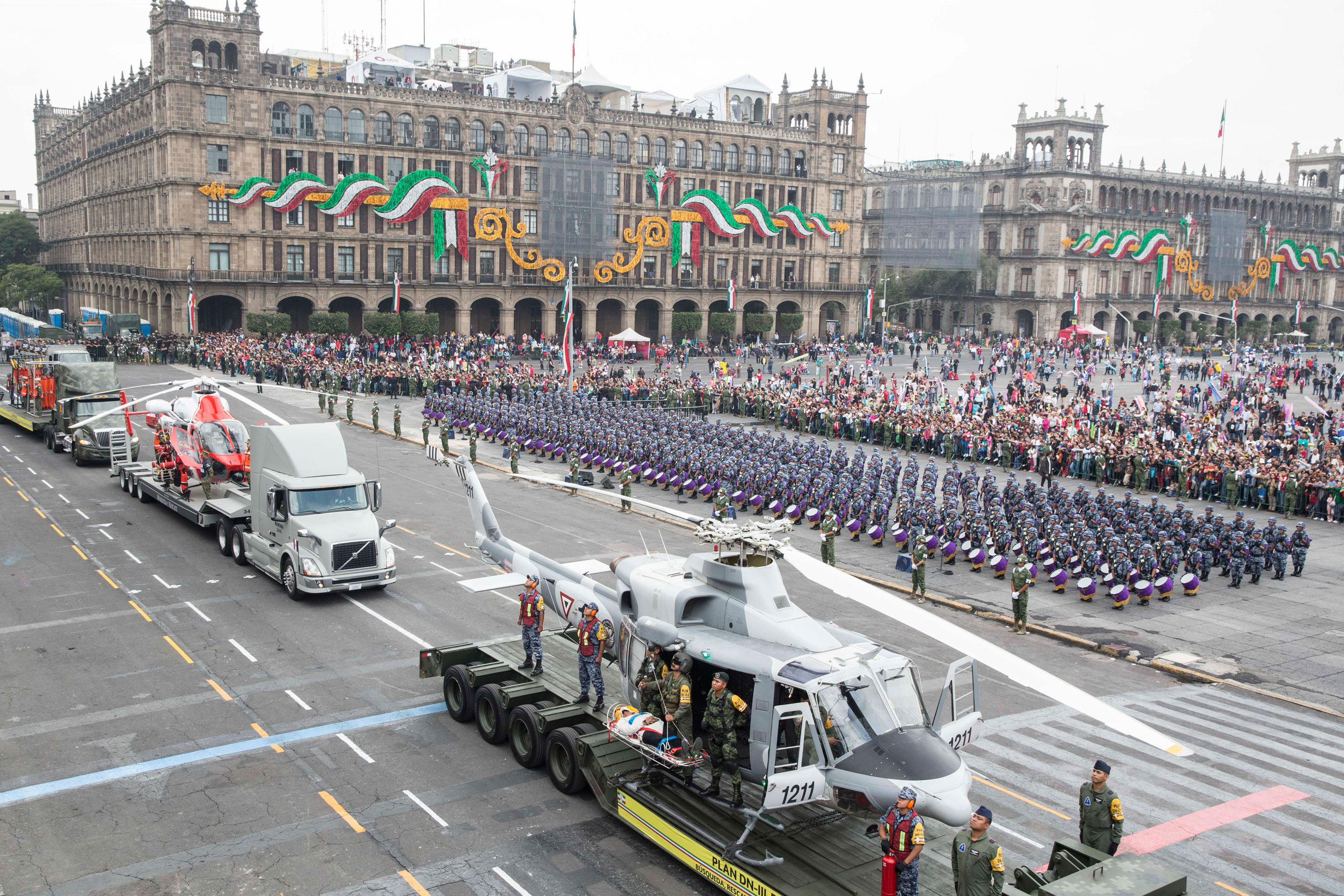
Military vehicles on parade in the Zócalo.

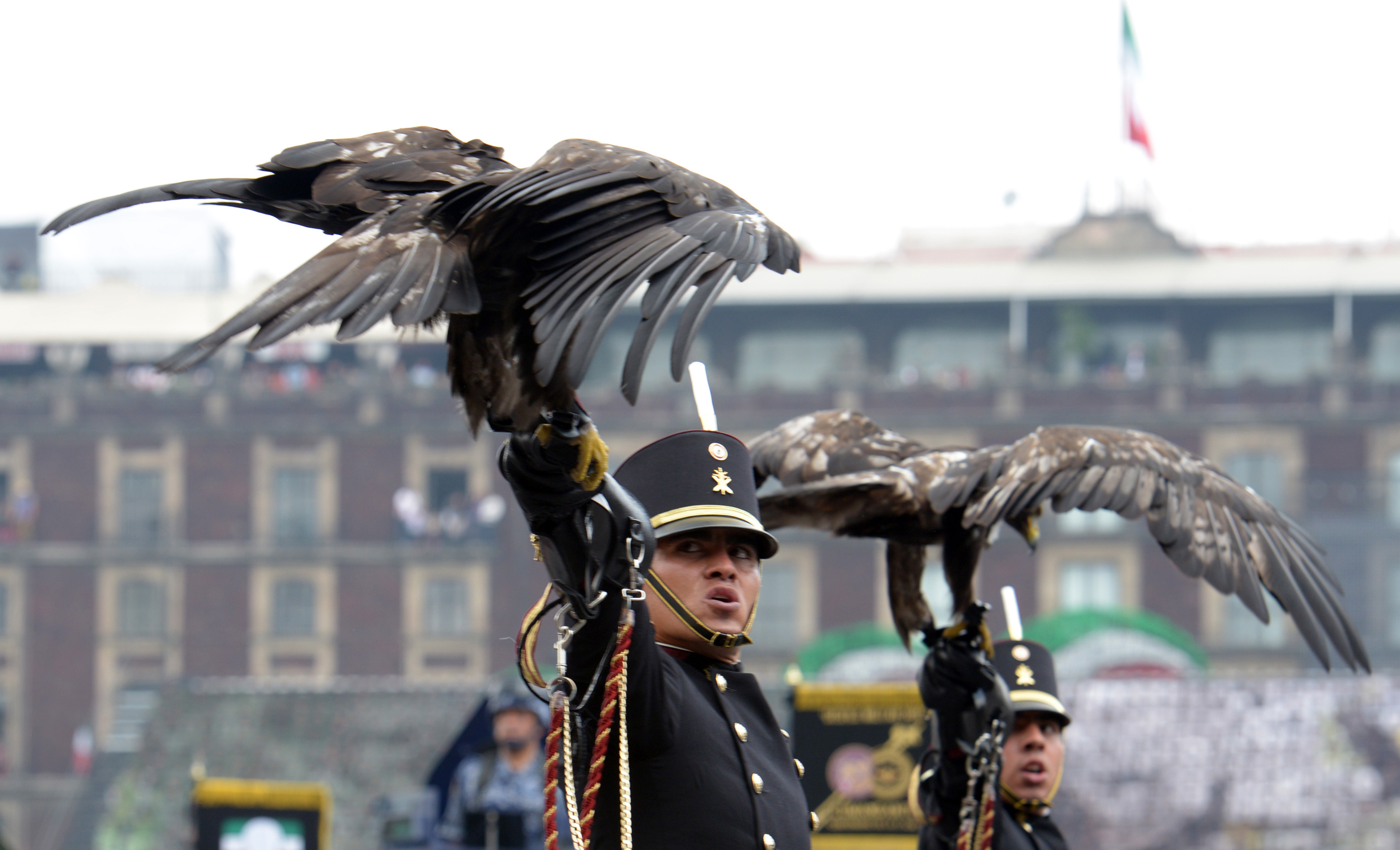
A cadet of the Heroic Military Academy with the academy mascot, a golden eagle.

The 16 September military parade in honour of the anniversary of Mexican Independence is an annual tradition dating back to the late 19th century and the beginning of the professionalisation of the Mexican Armed Forces in the 20th century. Held yearly in the Zócalo in Mexico City, this parade, the largest of the various parades held simultaneously nationwide on September 16, Mexican Independence Day, is presided by the President of Mexico in the fulfillment of his duty as the Supreme Commander of the Armed Forces. It is also attended by members of the Cabinet of Mexico, the Congress of the Union, civil service employees, the Secretaries of National Defense and Navy, members of the Mexican Armed Forces, uniformed service veterans, the state diplomatic corps, delegations representing the religious sector, indigenous peoples, sports and the private sector, and the general public. Seen on TV and the Internet and heard on radio, this is one of the biggest events of the year. Taking part in this are members of the Mexican Armed Forces and the National Guard.

== The Zócalo and the themes of the military parades ==
The Zócalo, right at the heart of Mexico City, has since the early 20th century the venue of the national Independence Day parades in honor of Mexican Independence Day due to its importance and long history. Its large space also allows the national parade to be more closer to the people. The theme always of the parade has been the celebration of national independence, but parades in recent years celebrated more important national occasions.

- 1985's parade, held before the earthquakes that struck Mexico City, marked the centennial diamond jubilee of national independence.
- The 1997 parade celebrated the sesquicentennial anniversary of the Battle of Chapultepec and the 175th year of the Heroic Military Academy.
- 2000's parade edition celebrated the New Millennium and 190 years of Mexican independence.
- 2009's parade marked the start of a year-long preparation for the Mexican Independence Bicentennial and Revolution Centennial as well as the golden jubilee of the Mexican Air Force Academy. It also focused on the integration of women into the ranks of the armed forces.
- 2010's parade celebrated the 200th year of Mexican Independence and the first to include historical contingents and the second appearance for foreign contingents. It also marked the first ever September 16 parade appearance of the Mexican Federal Police and was also the first to be livestreamed online.
- 2011's parade honored the Mexican Navy on its 190th year.
- 2012's parade celebrated the 150th year anniversary of the Battle of Puebla and 165 years of the glorious Battle of Chapultepec as well as the 190th anniversary of the Heroic Military Academy (the very school where the Ninos Heroes of 1847 took their studies).
- The 2013 edition of the parade honored the centennial celebrations of the Mexican Army as well as of the 1913 Loyalty March. It was expected to be one of the biggest ever parades held on the Zócalo. Card stunts made their debut on that year's parade.
- The 2014 edition was expected to honor the centennial of the historic United States occupation of Veracruz, with the Federal Police Gendarmerie Department expected to make its inaugural appearance. Due to a problem with the flag when it was about to be raised, the Canto a la Bandera was given an encore performance when it was finally raised on the large Zocalo flagpole.
- The 2015 parade celebrated the centennial anniversary of the formation of the Mexican Air Force and the diamond jubilee year of the actions of the Mexican Expeditionary Air Force during the Second World War.
- 2016 marked the centennial of Mexico's national military industry, the golden anniversary of Military Disaster Response (DN-III-3 and Navy Plans) and the 70th anniversary of the first airborne drop in Mexico.
- The 2017 parade marked the centennial jubilee year since both the enactment of the 1917 Constitution of Mexico and of the nation's maritime industry and the 170 years of the glorious Battle of Chapultepec as well as the 195th anniversary of the Heroic Military Academy and the 120th of the Heroic Naval Military School.
- The parade of 2018 marked the 50th anniversary of the Naval Aviation School and the 60th year of the Air Force Academy.
- The 2019 parade, which featured the debut of the reactivated National Guard, marked the 75th anniversary of the raising of the Mexican Expeditionary Air Force.
- 2020's parade, albeit being only featuring due to the COVID-19 pandemic in the country the mobile and air columns, aside from playing tribute to the Armed Forces and National Guard personnel at the frontlines of the pandemic, celebrated the pearl jubilee of the Special Forces Corps and the 80th anniversary of the current Secretariat of the Navy.
- The parade of 2021, which featured the return to a full parade while observing COVID-19 restrictions, celebrated the bicentennial of the conclusion of the War of Independence.
- The 2023 parade marked one of the climax activities marking the Heroic Military Academy Biccentennial. Parade included foreign honorary units from El Salvador, Ecuador, Brazil, Belize, Colombia, Chile, Cuba, China, Dominican Republic, Panama, Nepal, Nicaragua, Guatemala, Honduras, Russia, South Korea, Venezuela, Uruguay and Sri Lanka. For the first time the Academy Corps of Cadets fired a feu de joie in the pre-parade segment as a whole unit by its 6 battalions of cadets.
- The parade of 2024 marks the formal celebrations of the biccentenial of the proclamation of the Republic in 1824.

== Summary of the parade proceedings ==
On the morning of 16 September, the military parade participants march to the Zocalo to take their places. Since 2013 a card stunt formation also is part of the parade proper, showing delicate pictures and human graphics. Musical accompaniment is provided by the buglers, (since 2013) cavalry and artillery trumpeters and drummers of the Massed Corps of Drums of the Mexican Army and the massed military bands and combined choirs from both the Secretariats of National Defense and the Navy.

=== Flag raising and inspection ===
The parade since 2010 starts with the President of Mexico, the First Lady, the National Defense and Navy Secretaries, commanders of the armed forces and the National Guard, the presidents of the Chamber of Deputies and the Senate, and the President of the Supreme Court of Justice of the Nation walking towards the national flagpole in the Zócalo to raise the large Flag of Mexico. It is raised first to the Toque de Bandera by the drummers and buglers of the massed Corps of Drums and later with the massed military bands, together with the choirs of the National Defense and Navy Secretaries performing a rendition of the Canto a la Bandera or Song to the Flag (the Himno Nacional Mexicano was played during the 2013 flag raising). After the flag raising the President and the National Defense and Navy Secretaries ride on a military vehicle to inspect the parade on the Zócalo. When the inspection ends the three disembark as the vehicle arrives at the National Palace. The parade is later ordered by the Principal Bugler of the massed Corps of Drums to order arms and stand at ease.

=== Arrival honours and double march off ===
As the President of Mexico walks towards the balcony of the National Palace with the First Lady, the National Defense and Navy secretaries and the presidents of the Chamber of Deputies and the Senate, as they meet the military delegation present the massed Corps of Drums' principal bugler sounds a call to attention and the parade is ordered to present arms. As they appear on the balcony the bugle majors and the principal bugler give the signal for Marcha de Honor ("Honours March") to be played. As they play the massed bands play the "Himno Nacional Mexicano" accompanied by a 21-gun salute, and the Flag of Mexico is displayed on the card stunt. When the music ends the parade is ordered by the principal bugler to order arms.

Since 2020, following the arrival honours, the keynote speeches of the Secretaries of Navy and of National Defense and the President to the armed forces and the nation then follow.

It is followed by the Corps of Drums playing a bugle call as the parade is ordered for a double march off the Zócalo proper, preceded by a pre-parade exhortation by the parade commander.

=== Military exhibition ===
Following the double march the military exhibition begins with a parachute drop by members of the Brigada de Fusileros Paracaidistas and the Mexico Naval Infantry Force's airborne battalion on the Zócalo. It is followed by a display of the special forces units of the armed forces and with military vehicles driving on to the square. 2012 included an inaugural mobile bridge building and armor driving demonstration by the Mexico Army engineers and armor personnel.

=== Parade proper ===
After the exhibition, the parade commander waits for permission by the President of Mexico for the parade to begin. Once the permission has been granted the bugle majors and the principal buglers of the Corps of Drums give the signal to start with (paso redoblado) and as both them and the massed military bands play the National Defense March the parade proper begins with the march past the Mexican national flag and its color guard, the standard bearers of the Mexican Armed Forces and the colour guards of the Heroic Military Academy, the Heroic Naval Academy and the Air Force Academy, followed by soldiers carrying national flags. They are followed by the National Colours of the units under the Army and Air Force, and by the military contingents themselves and members of the National Guard, including a mobile column from the services. Parades held in recent years also featured international contingents and historical contingents as well, and even historic National Colours. At the same time a flypast featuring Mexican Air Force and Mexican Naval Aviation aircraft is also held. The parade ends with the much awaited cavalry walk march.

==== Full order of the military parade marchpast and mobile column ====
- Colour guard of the Flag of Mexico
- Standards of the Army, Navy and Air Force
- National Colors of the Army, Navy and Air Force
- Mexican flags
- National Colours of Army, Air Force and Navy units
- Historical National Colors
- Historical contingents
- International contingents
- Mexican Army Special Forces
- Mexican Army Parachute Rifle Brigade
- Mexican Army Military Police
- Presidential Military Staff and Presidential Guards Corps
- Mexican Army Engineers
- Mexican Army Infantry
- Mexican Army Logistics
- Mexican Air Force Aircrews and Pilots
- Mexican Air Force Logistics
- Mexican Air Force base personnel
- Mexican Air Force Military Police
- Mexican Army and Air Force educational institutions
- National Military Service
- Mexican Army Armored cavalry and Armor Branch
- Mexican Army Artillery
- Mexican Army Engineers mobile column
- Mexican Army Logistics
- Mexican Army and Air Force search and rescue vehicles
- Colour guard of the Mexican Navy Ensign
- Mexican Navy educational institutions
- Mexican Navy Fleet Forces
- Mexican Naval Infantry
- Mexican Naval Aviation
- National Military Naval Service of the Naval Infantry
- Mexican Navy Search and Rescue
- Mexican Naval Infantry vehicles and artillery
- Mexican National Guard
  - National Guard Academy
  - SWAT and K9 units
  - Search and Rescue Unit
  - Criminal Investigation Police
  - Federal Patrol Police
  - Air National Guard

== See also ==
- Fiestas Patrias (Mexico)
- Mexican Armed Forces
