= Mexican Navy Special Operations Unit =

Special Operations Forces
- Unidad de Operaciones Especiales
- Active: 2014 - present
- Allegiance: Mexico
- Branch: Mexican Navy
- Type: Naval special operations forces and naval commandos
- Part of: Mexican Marines
- Motto: Donde La Patria Nos Requiera (Wherever the Homeland Needs Us)

The Mexican Navy Special Operations Unit (Spanish: Unidad de Operaciones Especiales (UNOPES) is the special operations command of the Mexican Marines. It was formed on September 15, 2014. Members of UNOPES undergo rigorous training in various specialized skills.

This command is integrated into different groups, namely:

- Fuerzas Especiales (FES)
- Commando Battalions
- Marine Paratrooper Battalion
- 27th Marine Infantry Battalion (QRF)
- Logistics Group
