= Mexican Naval Infantry Corps =

Marine Corps of Mexico

- Cuerpo de Infantería de Marina
- Naval Infantry emblem
- Founded: 1822
- Country: Mexico
- Allegiance: Mexico
- Branch: Mexican Navy
- Type: Naval infantry
- Size: 38,000 men
- Garrison/HQ: Mexico City, Mexico
- Mottos: En la tierra, en el aire y en el mar (English: On land, air and sea); Todo por la Patria (English: All for the Fatherland)
- Colors: Scarlet
- Anniversaries: June 1, Marine Day

Commanders
- Current commander: Admiral José Rafael Ojeda Durán

Insignia
- Flag

Mexican Naval Infantry Special Forces badge

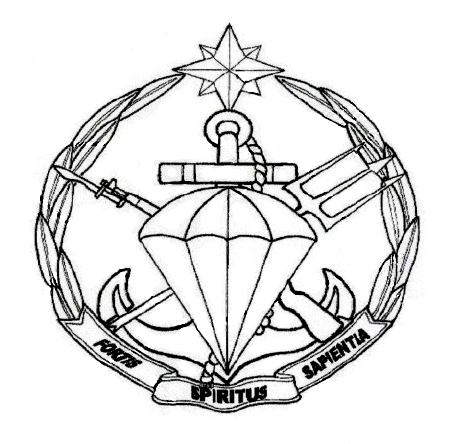
Mexican Naval Infantry Special Forces beret insignia

The Mexican Naval Infantry Corps (Spanish: Cuerpo de Infantería de Marina) are the naval infantry force of the Mexican Navy of the Mexican Armed Forces. The main task of the marine corps is to guarantee the maritime security of the country's ports and external and internal defense of the country. To accomplish these responsibilities, the corps is trained and equipped to take on any type of operations from sea, air and land.

The Corps is additionally responsible for Mexico's naval special operations forces (SOF), managing the Mexican Navy Special Operations Unit, itself responsible for the Fuerzas Especiales (Special Forces).

The Naval Infantry Corps was reorganized in 2007–2009 into 30 Naval Infantry Battalions (Batallones de Infantería de Marina—BIM), a paratroop battalion, a battalion attached to the Presidential Guard Brigade, two fast reaction forces with six battalions each, and three special forces groups. The Naval Infantry are responsible for port security, protection of the ten-kilometer coastal fringe, and patrolling major waterways.

== Mission ==
To accomplish the necessary services and tasks, the Naval Infantry's overall responsibilities are to develop amphibious naval capabilities in the areas of operations of the navy in order to mobilize naval troops immediately and decisively.

The Naval Infantry execute the following tasks:

- Command and Control: Planning, preparation and conduct of operations.
- Amphibious assault: To execute amphibious operations as part of a Naval Force.
- Air assault: To run infiltration operations in areas of difficult access.
- Amphibious command: To execute special operations such as: reconnaissance, incursions, urban combat and to support other regular operations.
- Combat Support: To execute operations in support of artillery in the development of amphibious and other regular forces operations
- Reconnaissance: Operations to obtain information to support operational units.
- Immediate Response: To run operations in emergency situations, to help the civilian population.

== History ==
The roots of the Naval Infantry Corps can trace its roots to the independence of Mexico in 1821. Between 1821 & 1822, independent Mexico created the Secretariat of the Admiralty headed by Don Agustín de Iturbide, who assigned the first units of the Mexican Army, which consisted of four battalions, two of them classified as "Marina" stationed in San Blas and Veracruz.

=== Mexican Drug War ===
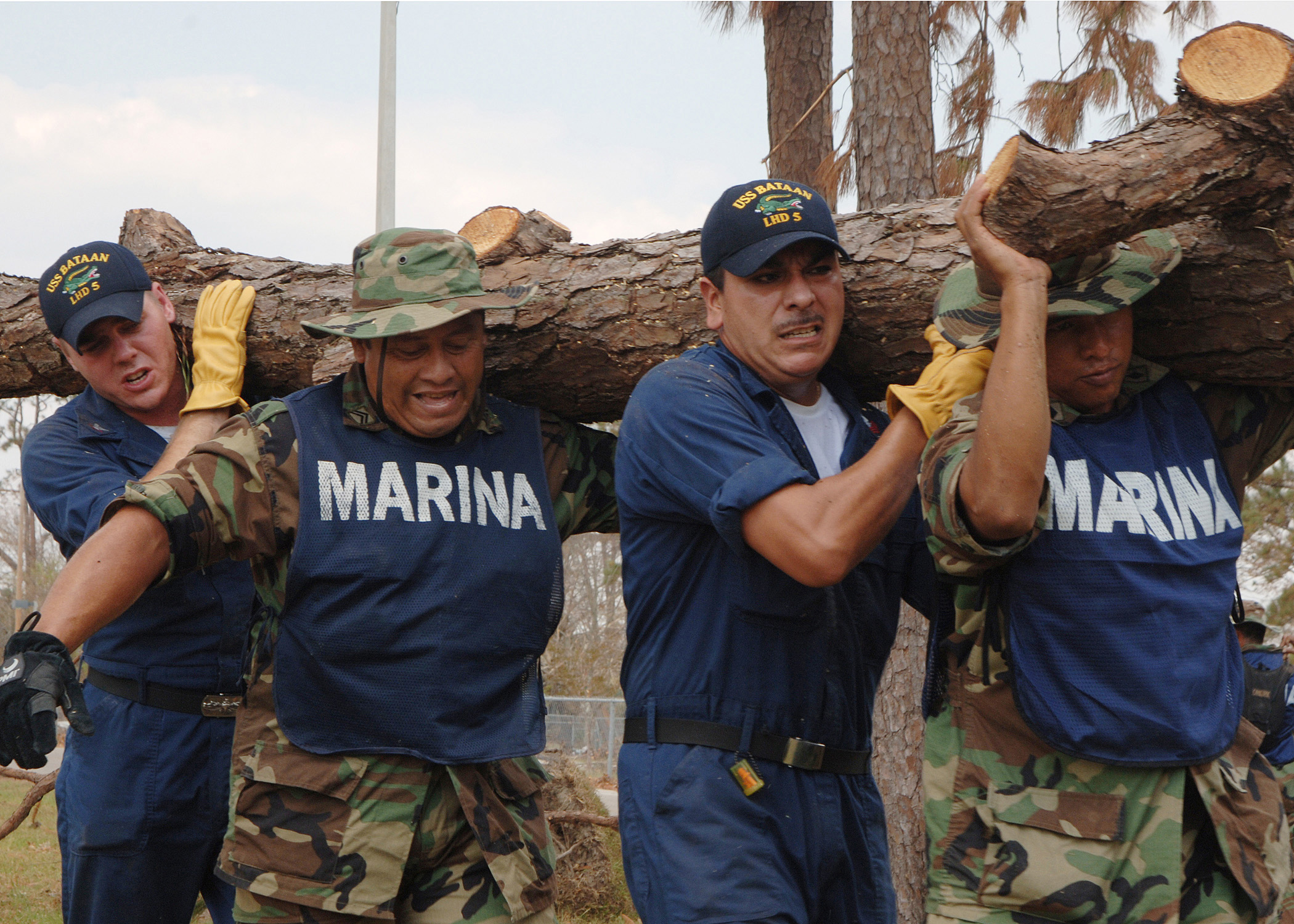
Mexican Marines and U.S. Navy sailors from amphibious assault ship USS Bataan cleaning up debris following the aftermath of Hurricane Katrina in D'Iberville, Mississippi in 2005

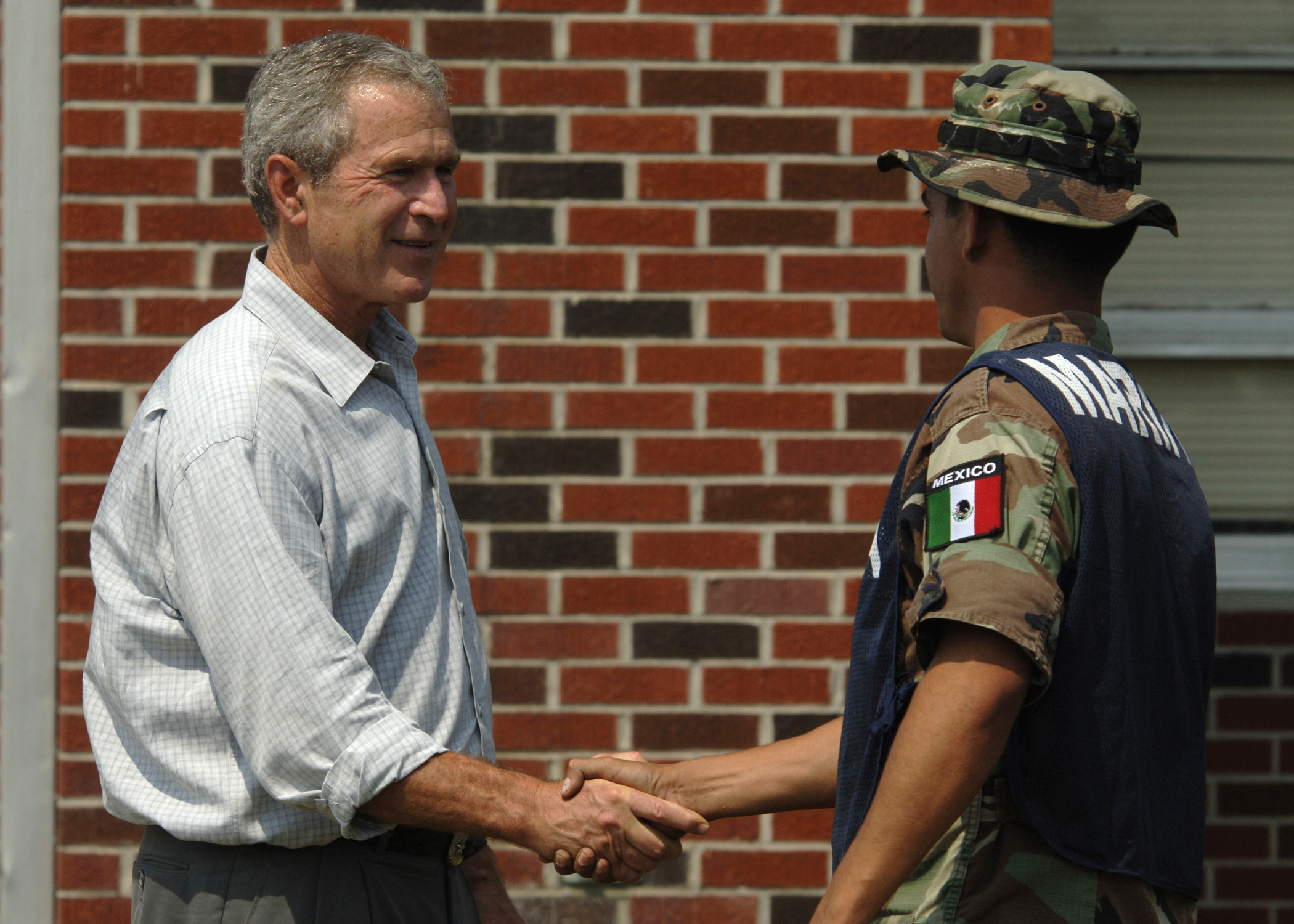
U.S. President George W. Bush conveys his gratitude to a Mexican Marine, on their clean up efforts in Gulfport, Mississippi after Hurricane Katrina in 2005

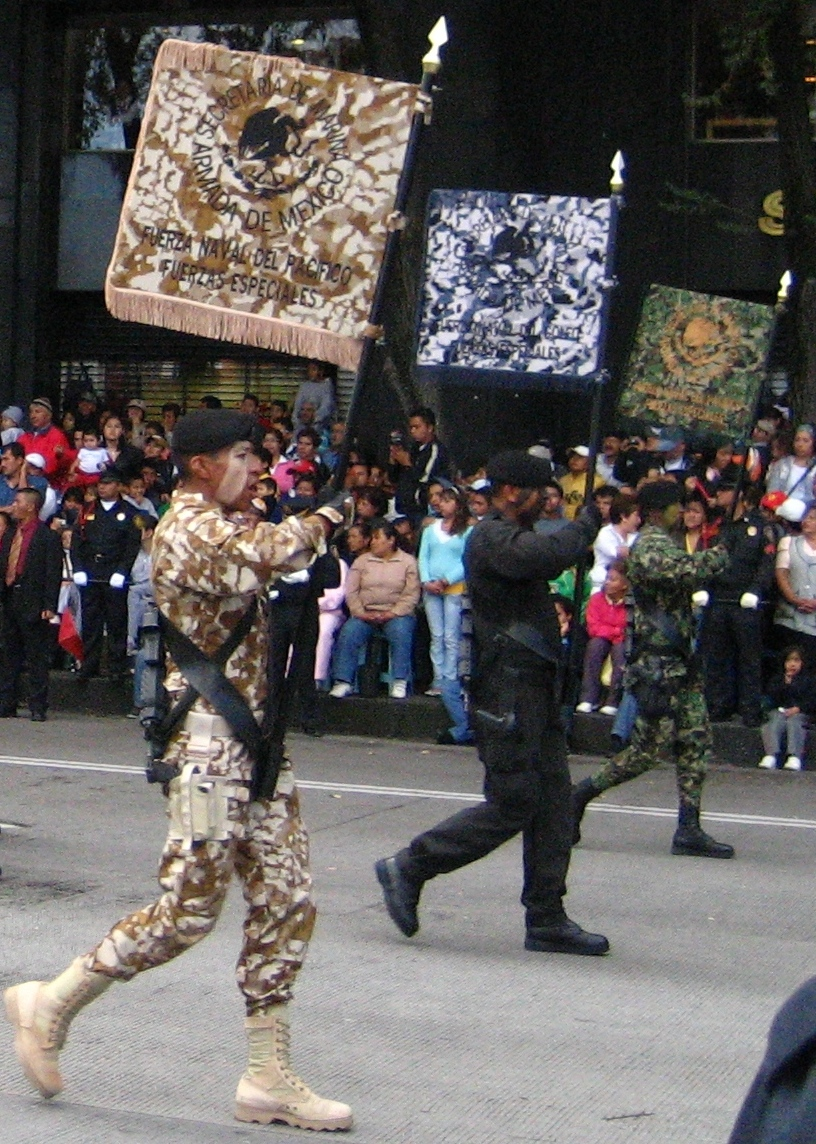
Mexican Marines in Mexico's 2009 independence day parade displaying three different camouflage patterns used by the Mexican Marine Corps.

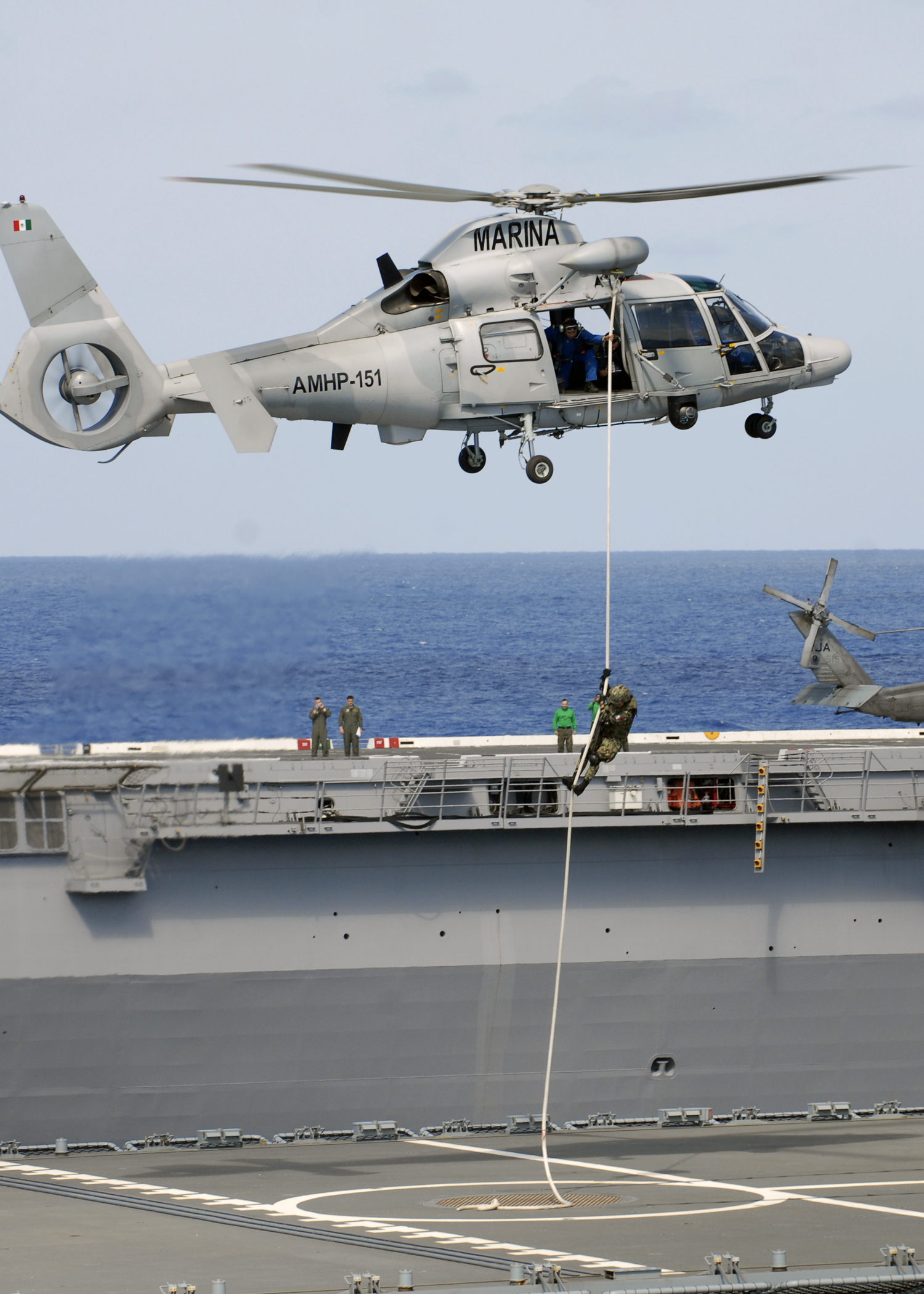
A Mexican Marine fast-ropes onto the flight deck of the German support ship Frankfurt Am Main during a simulated multi-national maritime interdiction operation in 2009

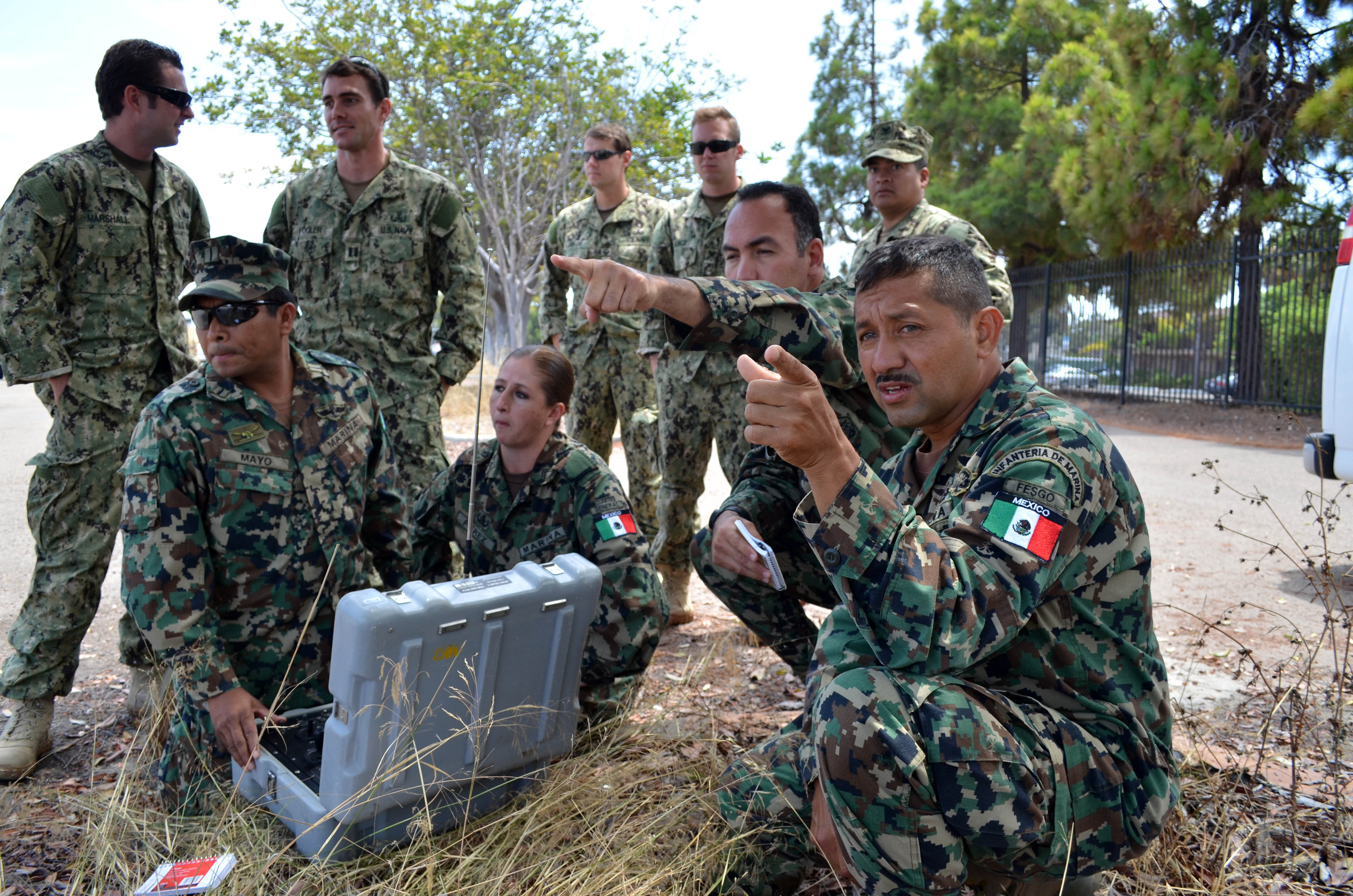
Mexican Marine explosive ordnance disposal technicians formulate a plan to defeat a simulated improvised explosive device during a subject matter expert exchange with U.S. sailors in San Diego, California in 2012

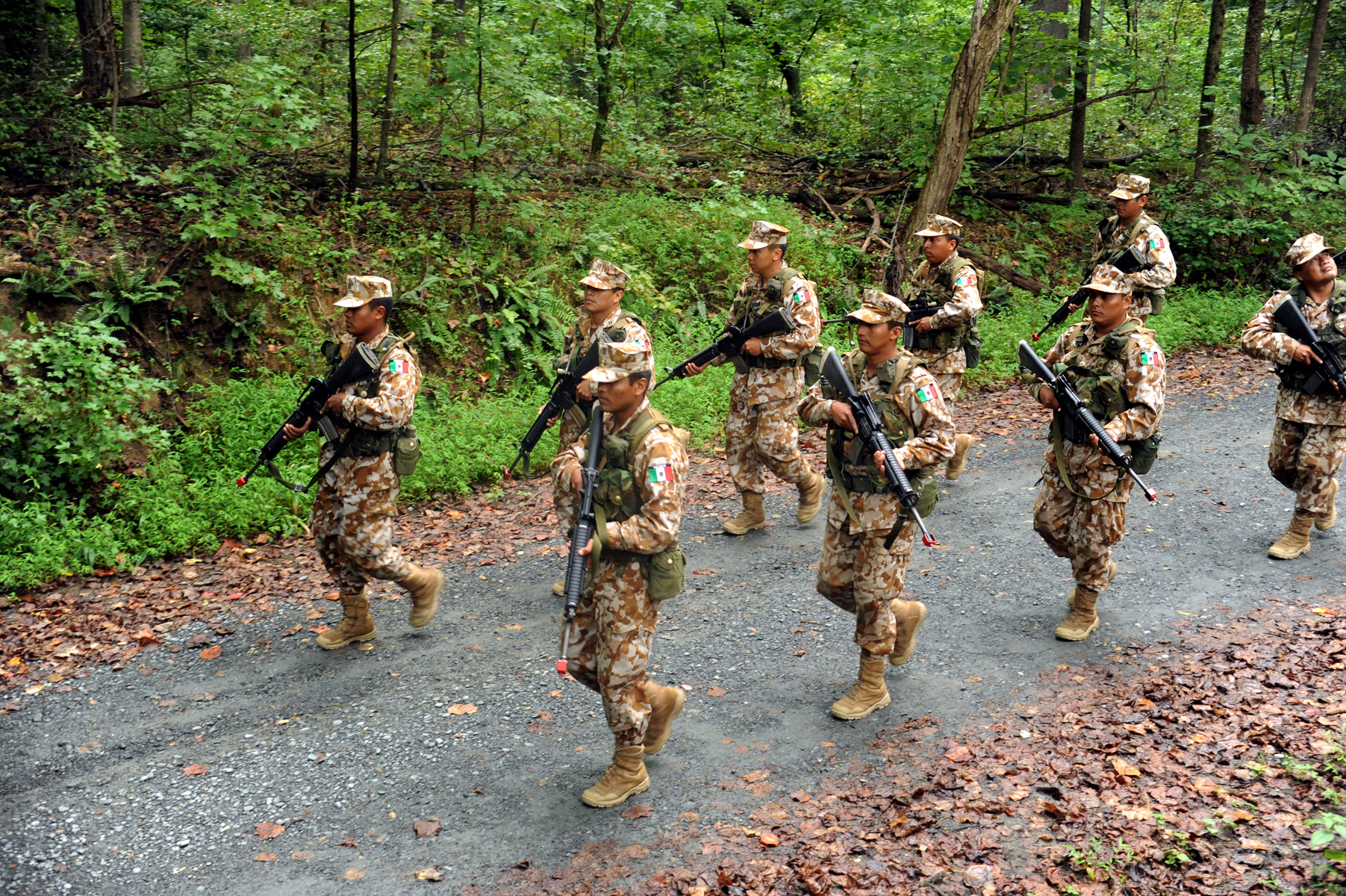
Mexican Marines on a training patrol at Officer Candidate School, Marine Corps Base Quantico, Quantico, Virginia in 2009

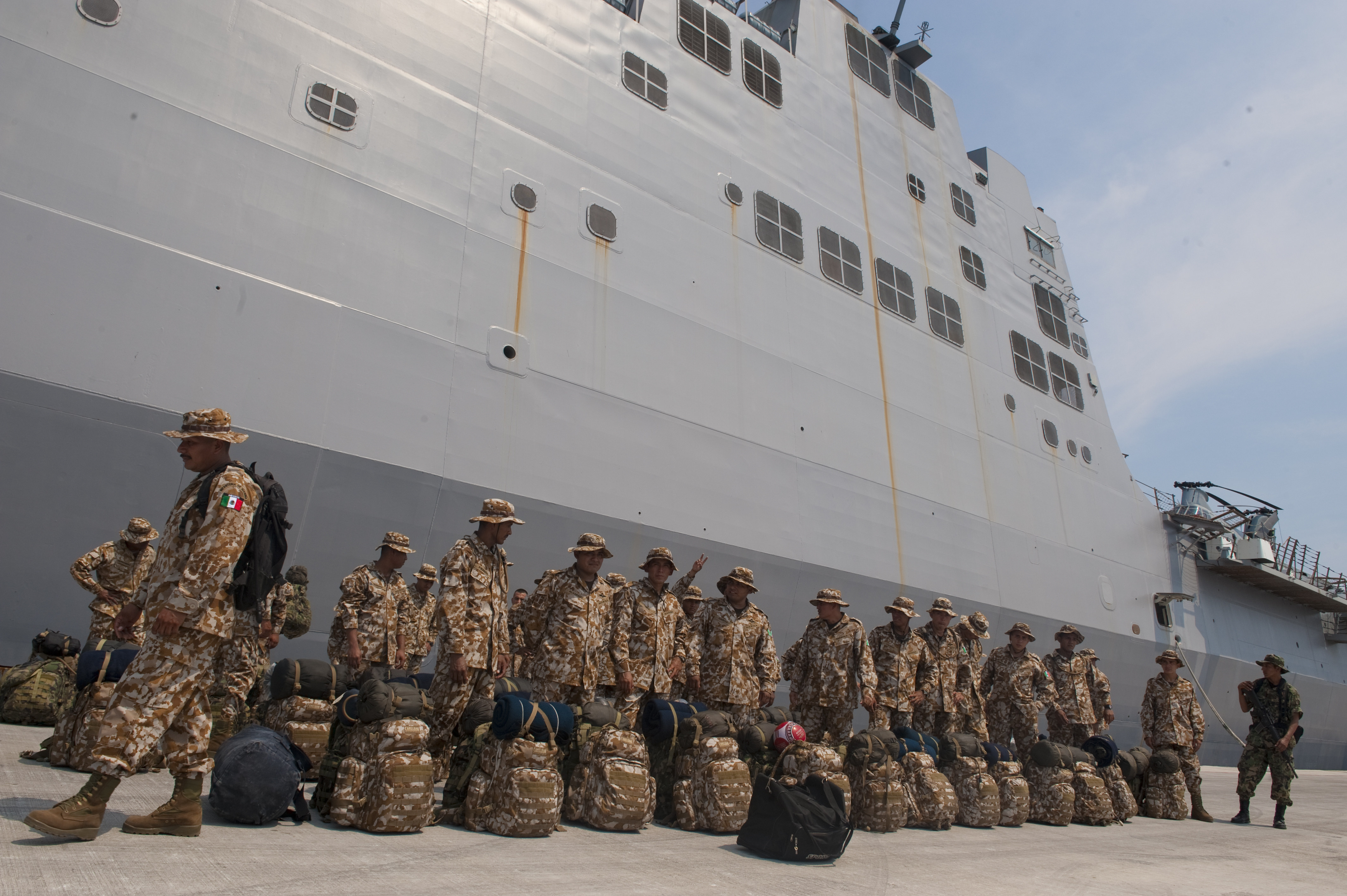
Mexican Marines wait to board the amphibious transport dock ship USS New Orleans for exercises in Manzanillo, Mexico in 2010

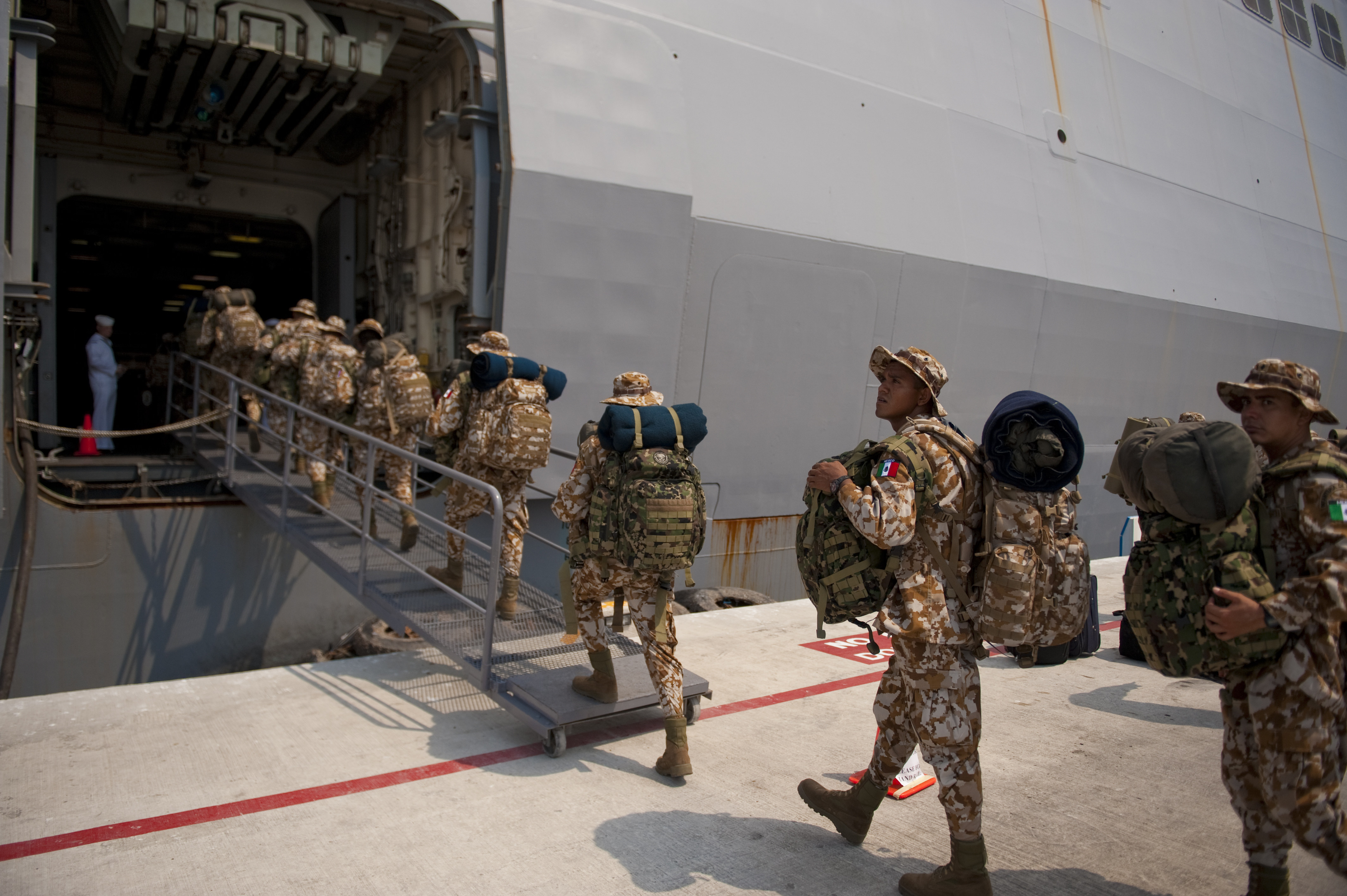
Mexican Marines board the amphibious transport dock ship USS New Orleans for exercises in Manzanillo, Mexico in 2010

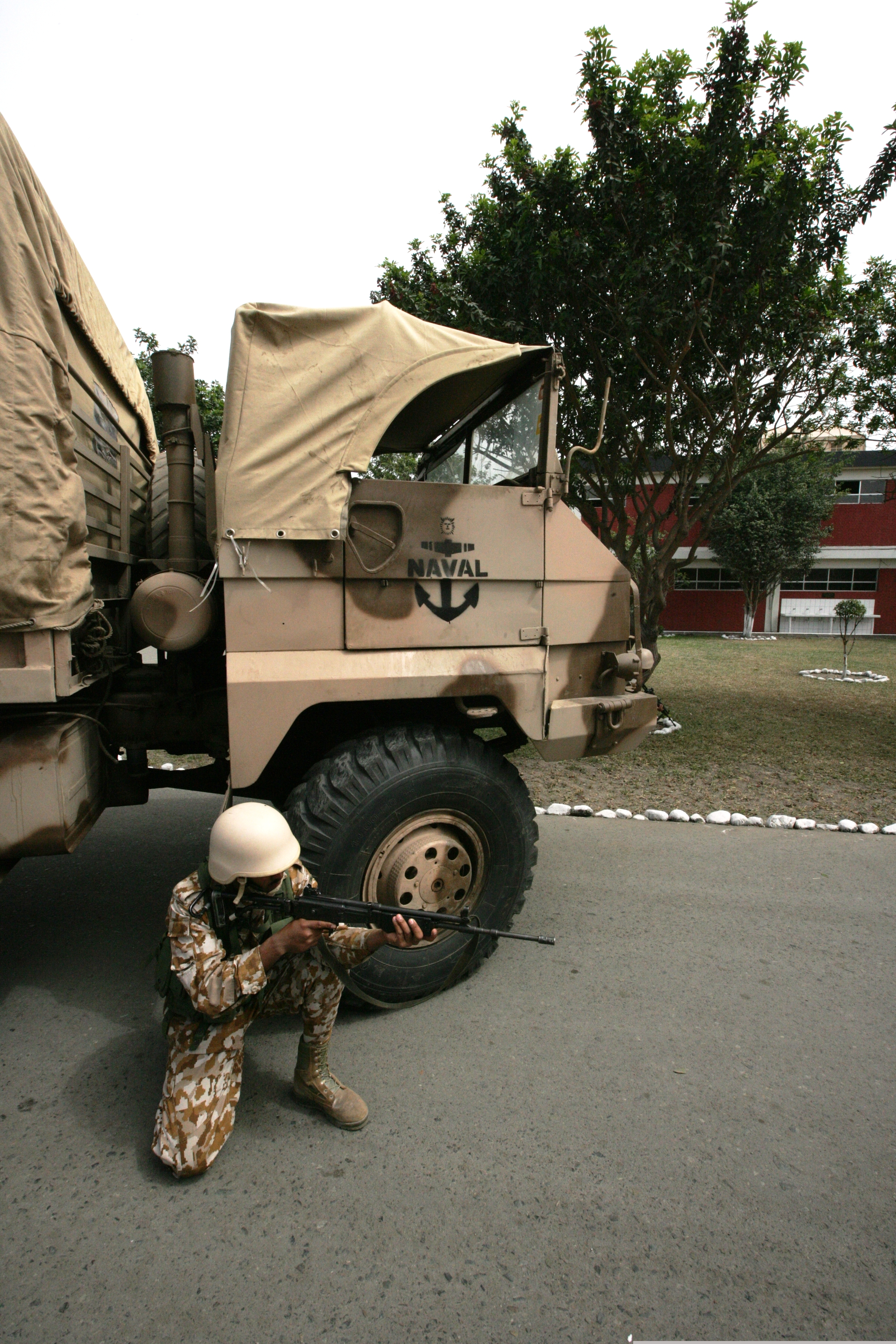
A Mexican Marine naval infantryman carrying an FN FAL 50.61 Rifle holds a security position beside a Peruvian Navy troop transport Pegaso truck in support of noncombatant evacuation training during the Partnership of the Americas in Ancón, Peru in 2010

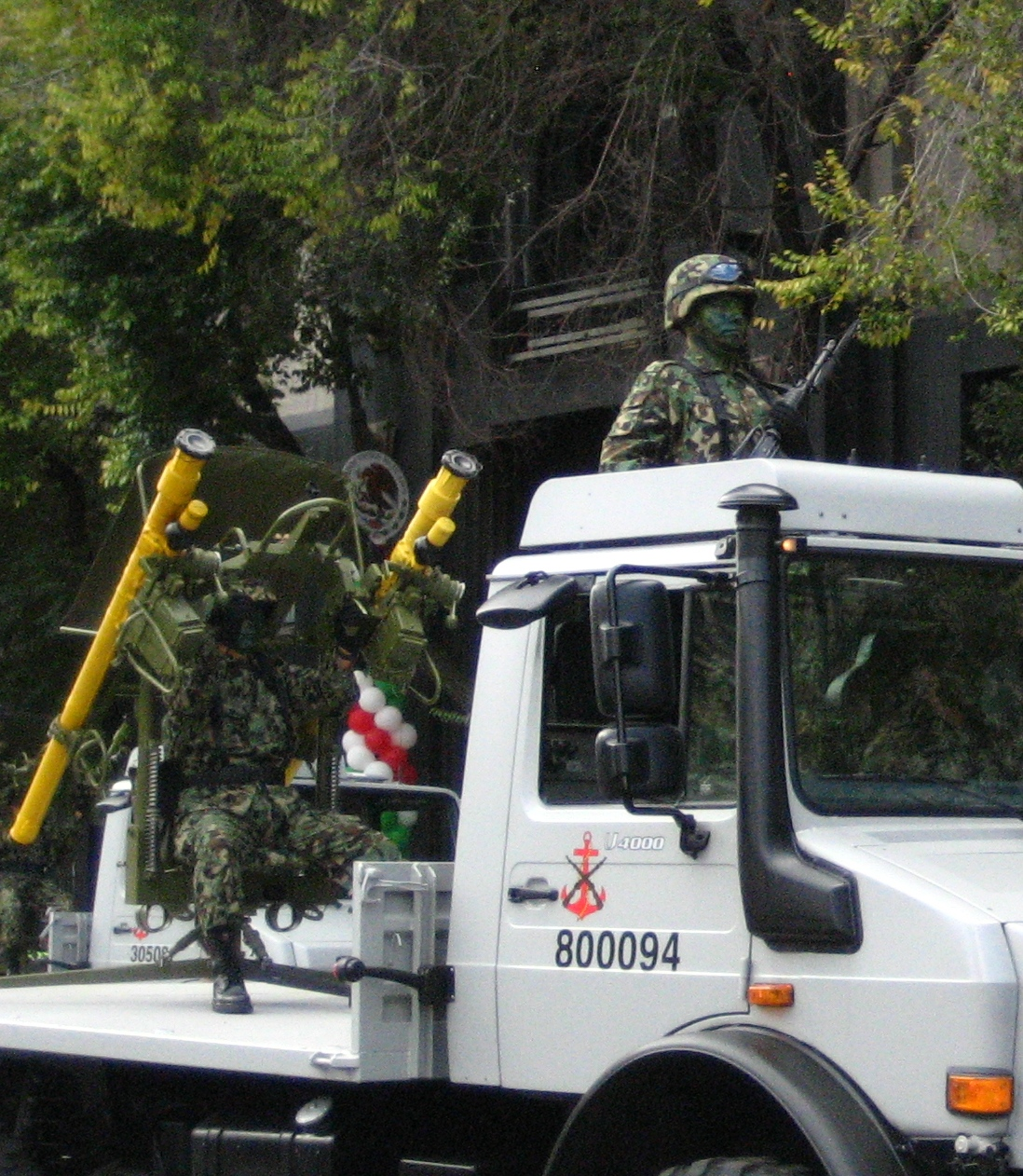
Mexican Marines manning a Russian 9K38 Igla surface-to-air missile (SAM) dual missile launch platform mounted on a Mercedes-Benz Unimog truck of the Mexican Navy in 2009

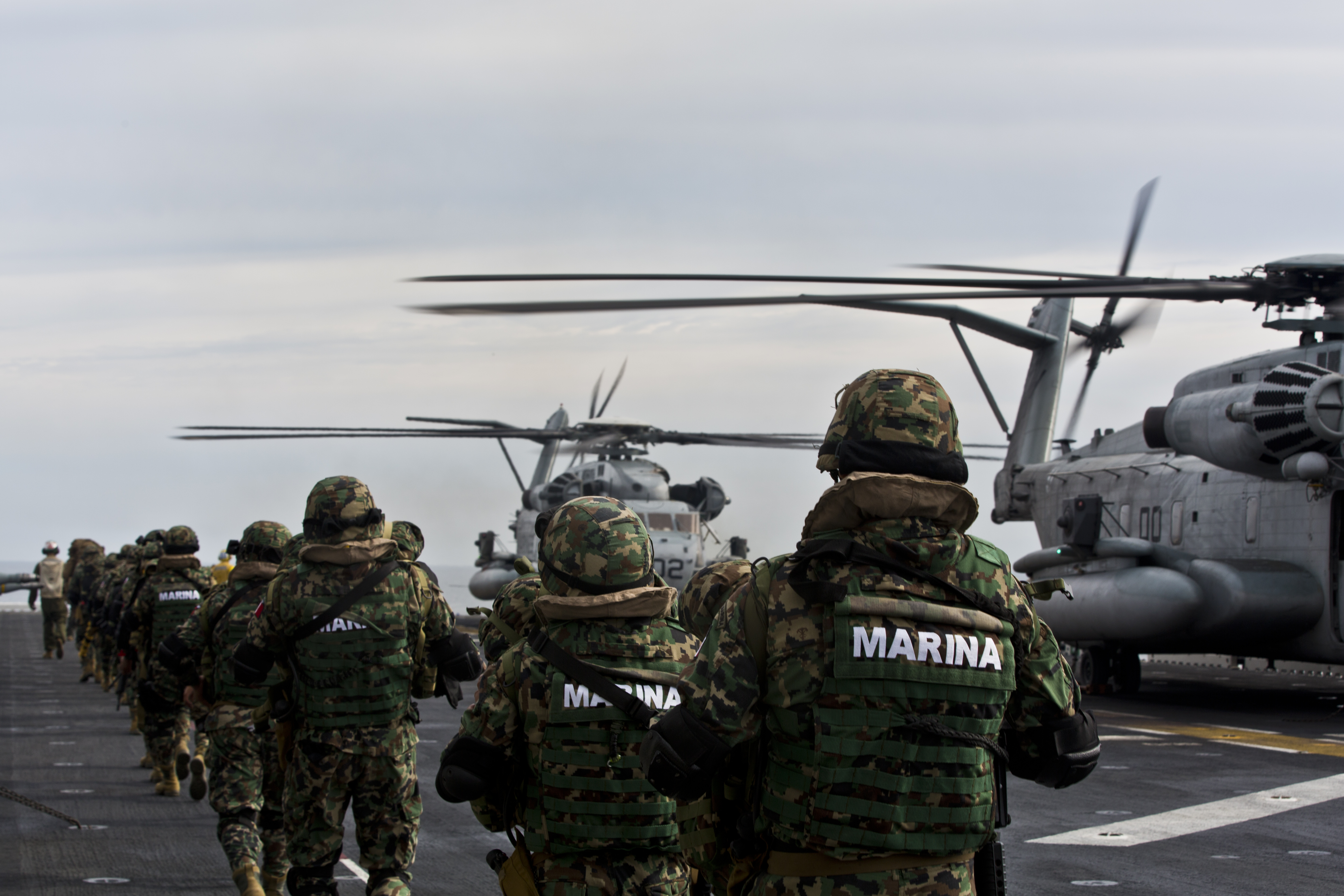
Mexican Marines transport their gear to a Sikorsky CH-53E Super Stallion aboard the USS Kearsarge during Bold Alligator exercises in 2014

Since the start of President Felipe Calderón's war on the drug cartels, the Infantería de Marina's role has grown from maritime and port security to land based operations in combating organized crime, drug trafficking, extermination of marijuana fields, drug interdictions at sea, and also participating in arrest of cartel suspects.

The Navy has carried out permanent intense anti-narcotic operations. Such tasks as the extermination of marijuana fields which mostly takes place in the north-western part of the country is done by first locating the fields by satellite or simply by air reconnaissance, then sending a team of Marines to eradicate the cannabis plants. One of its big seizures was in late October 2007, when Navy personnel in a joint operation with other agencies seized 23 tons of cocaine in the port city of Manzanillo, Colima. Due to its actions, the view of the Navy and in kind the Naval Infantry Force has risen in stature in the United States.

==== Narco submarine interception ====
Drug interdiction at sea is also part of the Navy's strategy to combat drug trafficking, this came to light when, on July 16, 2008, the Navy intercepted a 10-meter-long (33-foot) narco submarine travelling about 200 kilometres (120 miles) off the southwest of the state of Oaxaca; in a raid, Navy Special Forces rappelled from a helicopter on to the deck of the narco submarine and arrested four smugglers before they could scuttle their vessel. The vessel was found to be loaded with 5.8 tons of cocaine and was towed to Huatulco, Oaxaca, by a Navy patrol boat.

=== Hurricane Katrina relief ===
Mexico sent marines to the U.S. in 2005 for disaster relief after Hurricane Katrina.

== Symbols ==
=== Emblem ===
The shield anchor, crossed with the carbine, has been part of the Naval Infantry since 1823. The shield of the Naval Infantry, as today, is the essence of their integration into the meaning of heraldry. Examples are the gold trim, which gives nobility, seriousness and elegance; the Admiralty anchor, which symbolizes belonging to the Navy; and finally crossed muskets, symbolizing the weapons used by the first generation personnel of the Naval Infantry strengthening the country as a nation-state, free and sovereign. Together they represent the dedication to serve Mexico by air, land and sea. The color red has always characterized the Marines around the world.

=== Banner ===
The Iconography of the Marines of Mexico has developed a description of the standard as follows: at the center, the Marine Shield with its original colors, scarlet red cloth with gold-colored robes. In addition to being waved at official ceremonies, the Corps Standard (Estandarte) is present in all parades wherein the Corps takes part as a constituent branch of the navy proper. The corps standard is also present in the Corps Headquarters, all unit bases and in the Secretariat of the Navy.

== Organization and role ==
The overall head of the Naval Infantry is the president of Mexico Claudia Sheinbaum, in her role as commander-in-chief of the Mexican Armed Forces. Operational control of the NIF falls under the responsibility of the Secretary of the Navy.

The navy is defined in its strategic review by the status of Mexico as a coastal state, highlighting the importance of its borders with the United States of America, Belize and Guatemala, and identifying areas of strategic importance such as the Caribbean and the Yucatán Channel, for their transit of maritime trade is of great importance for the country, without forgetting that it is also an area crowded by tourist cruises that visit Mexican ports and their use as a runner and high rate of drug trafficking activities. The Bay of Campeche, which is distinguished by its deposits of oil and marine resources and the enormous network of oil and gas pipelines between the production platforms and destinations on the coast, the Isthmus of Tehuantepec and the Gulf area by sea and land are considered as a future strategic development of the country, industrial corridor and gateway between the Pacific and Gulf of Mexico; the Grijalva Hydroelectric Complex is considered an important center of power generation in the country; and the Gulf of California has ecological importance and tourist influence, as well as activities of a drug trafficking corridor.

=== Reaction Forces ===
To meet the operational requirements of the navy, it was necessary to create the structure of a reaction force with organizational skills focusing on: flexibility, multi-tactical use of rapid response, firepower, mobility and economy of forces, in addition to the efforts of support for transport by air, sea and land, to the missions and tasks assigned by the navy to fulfill its mission.

Therefore, the Amphibious Marine Reaction Force is defined as an organized force, equipped and trained as a component part of a Naval Force to develop operations in the immediate response missions that are assigned. It falls into an operational concept which states that given the need to respond as a projection of naval power, it requires that their actions be limited by an autonomous period of time. According to the task, units are integrated to meet requirements identified in a variety of operational environments; their capacity to be transported by sea, air, and land are organic to the unit. Therefore, the flexibility of its organizational units can integrate in different areas of operations such as amphibious combat, desert and mountain combat, urban operations in the jungle, night airborne assault, and vertical river of interdiction raids, in addition to other civic action operations and support to other units when ordered.

=== Structure ===
After reorganization, the Marine forces were deployed under a new strategic operational concept with specific functions, including in the navy to the following Marine Corps units:

- Two Amphibious Reaction Forces—deployed along the country's coastline, each comprising two Amphibious Infantry Battalions, Artillery Battalions, Amphibious Commando Battalions, Boat and Vehicle Battalions and Amphibious and Services Battalions.
- Thirty Naval Infantry Battalions are organized as follows:
  - 28 are organized into eight regional Brigades deployed as follows:
    - three on the Gulf coast: 1st, 3rd, and 5th each with four battalions,
    - four on the Pacific coast: 2nd with one battalion, 4th with five battalions, 6th and 8th with four battalions each, and
    - one (the 7th) in Mexico City with two battalions,
  - one Presidential Guard Battalion (24th Batallón de Infantería de Marina de Guardias Presidenciales),
  - one Paratrooper Battalion (BIMFUSPAR: Batallón de Infantería de Marina de Fusileros Paracaidistas),
- two small Commando Battalions: Batallón De Comandos Del Golfo (BATCOGO) and Batallón de Comandos Del Pacífico (BATCOPA),
- Three Special Forces Groups: FESGO (Fuerzas Especiales del Golfo), FESPA (Fuerzas Especiales del Pacifico), FESCEN (Fuerzas Especiales del Centro)
- one Naval Police Battalion,
- 24 Marine (National Service) Battalions for National Service personnel, raised recently, plus 1 Marine Regiment (National Service)

There are two Marine Amphibious Groups (the Gulf and Pacific), which have replaced the two Reaction Amphibious Forces, whose mission is the defense of national coastlines against any conventional aggression. Each has a total manpower of 3,000 men. Both are composed of two Amphibious Battalions of Marines, a Battalion of Marines Commandos, a Marine Artillery Battalion, an Amphibious Vehicles and Vessels Battalion, which includes 12 armored APC-70, and a Service Battalion.

The 24th Marine Battalion "Presidential Guards", created in 1983, is responsible for providing security to the president. It is quartered in Mexico City, like the BIMFUSPAR (Marine Parachute Fusilier Battalion).

Finally there are 3 Marine Special Forces Groups (Strength, Spirit and Wisdom is their motto). The FESGO (Special Forces Gulf) and the FESPA (Special Forces Pacific), both destined for missions in support of the then new Amphibious Forces Reaction In 2008, formed the FESCEN (Special Forces Center), based in Mexico City, whose purpose is to provide the High Command Headquarters a grouping of special forces mission critical. While FESGO and FESPA have an effective of 220 marines each, the FESCEN has less than 160 personnel.

The Marine Parachute Battalion is an elite force, which is the strategic reserve of the High Command of the Mexican Navy for high impact operations and emergency. The organizational and operational needs motivated the creation of BIMFUSPAR in 1992. The new unit was championed by then-President Carlos Salinas de Gortari, on June 1, 1994. The Battalion is divided into three Marine Paratrooper Rifle Companies, a Weapon Support Company and a Command Group. The Company Headquarters and Services is integrated into the grouping of services 7th Marine Brigade, which belongs since 2010.

Each Marine Battalion has three Marine Infantry Companies, a Company of Support Weapons (mortars, rocket launchers and machine guns) and Services. Each Company has three Sections, each of three Platoons, which are themselves composed of thirteen elements in three Squads of four men under the command of a Third or Second Master. The Squads are formed by a Corporal Squad Leader, a rifleman grenadier armed with M16A2 and M203 40 mm grenade launcher, a submachine gunner with a Colt RO 750 LSW 5.56 mm. and a rifleman with a standard M16A2. The organization of a Platoon at three Squads, a Section in three Platoons and a Company into three Sections responds to the need in any case with the three decisive factors in combat: assault element, the support and security.

==== Special Forces Units ====
Fuerzas Especiales (FES), (Special Forces), is a Special Operations Unit of the Navy officially established in late 2001.

== Equipment ==
Naval Infantry Inventory
Vehicle/System	Status	Origin
Land Vehicles
APC-70	Modified BTR-60, has diesel engine and it does not have the turret with the 14.5 mm machine gun. Used with a 40 mm Mk 19 grenade launcher or Machine Gun	Russia
Ural-4320	Off-road 6x6 truck	Russia
Sherpa Light	Light Armored Vehicle armed with M2 Browning 12.7mm Heavy Machine Gun	France
Carat Wolverine Armored Car	Armoured Vehicle based on the Ford F-Series chassis, In Mexico these vehicles are known as Scorpions. It's armed with single M2 Browning 12.7mm Heavy Machine Gun.	Mexico
UNIMOG U-4000		Germany
Freightliner M2	4x2 truck	Mexico
MiniComando Ford	4x4 F-250 series pick up	Mexico
MiniComando Dodge	4x4 Pick up	Mexico
Mercedes-Benz G-Class	4x4 cross-country vehicle	Germany
Land Rover	4x4	United Kingdom
Dodge Ram	Crew cab pick up installed with handle bars and turret to install M2 Browning MG	Mexico/United States
Ford F-150	Crew cab pick up installed with handle bars	Mexico/United States
Chevrolet Cheyenne	Crew cab pick up installed with handle bars	Mexico/United States
Assault Rifles
Colt IAR	In service	United States
SIG Sauer SIG516	In service	United States
M4 Carbine	In service	United States
Submachine gun
Heckler & Koch MP5	In service	Germany
Heckler & Koch UMP	In service	Germany
FN P90	In service	Belgium
Mendoza HM-3	In Service	Mexico
Machine guns
M2 Browning machine gun	In service	United States
HK21	In service	Germany
CETME Ameli	In service	Spain
FN Minimi	In service	Belgium
GAU-19	In service. Used on board of MD902 Helicopter.	United States
Grenade launcher
CIS 40 AGL 40mm grenade launcher	In service	Singapore
Milkor MGL	In service	South Africa
M203 grenade launcher	In service	United States
Shotgun
Remington 1100	In service	United States
Sniper rifle
Heckler & Koch MSG90	In service	Germany
Barrett M82	In service	United States
Remington 700	In service	United States
Pistol
Glock pistol	In service	Austria
Heckler & Koch USP	In service	Germany
FN Five-seveN	In service. Special Forces	Belgium
Colt 1911	In service	United States
Artillery
OTO Melara Mod 56 105 mm	In service	Italy
Bofors 40 mm	In Service	Sweden
51 mm FIROS (Multiple Launch Rocket System)	In Service	Italy
60 mm and 81 mm mortars	In Service	Mexico
