= Fuerza Especial Conjunta =

Mexican Army counter-terrorism unit

Joint Special Operations Command
- Fuerza Especial Conjunta
- Active: February 25, 2025 - present
- Country: Mexico
- Allegiance: SEDENA
- Branch: Joint National Defense Staff
- Type: Special forces
- Role: Counter Terrorism; Anti-Cartel Operations
- Size: classified
- Garrison/HQ: Military Camp 1-F, Mexico City
- Nicknames: Alto Mando, Contraterroristas, Bukalos
- Mottos: "Speed, Surprise, Violence of Action"

The Fuerza Especial Conjunta (Joint Special Operations Command) or FEC, is a joint component command of SEDENA, under operational control of the Joint National Defense Staff (Estado Mayor Conjunto de la Defensa Nacional) tasked with counter terrorism and anti cartel operations.

The unit's missions primarily involve black operations, capture or kill high values targets, counterterrorism and hostage rescue crisis management, direct action on key targets, ISTAR, long-range penetration, maneuver warfare, special operations in missions that are extremely high-risk and highly sensitive, special reconnaissance, and VIPs protection.

The Command integrates the best elements of the Special Forces Corps of the Mexican Army, the Parachute Rifle Brigade and the Special Immediate Reaction Force of the National Guard.

== Role ==
As of January 7, 2022, the integration of the Mexico Joint Task Force was implemented, establishing itself as a multipurpose force, under the orders of the Secretary of National Defense, with rapid deployment, with strategic mobility and firepower necessary to address critical scenarios that exceed the response capacity of local authorities, directed by the President of Mexico.

SEDENA reported that the FEC's initial core strength of 200 operators, drawn from Parachute Brigade and Special Forces Command, though selection is open to other conventional forces across the Army and also other branches such the Air Force and National Guard.

The Fuerza Especial Conjunta (FEC) was formally established by Mexico's Secretaría de la Defensa Nacional (SEDENA) on February 25, 2025.

=== Organization and structure ===
The unit is under the organization of the Joint National Defense Staff (EMCDN). Command of FEC is led by a Colonel or LTC Virtually all information about the unit is highly classified and details about specific missions or operations generally are not available publicly. The unit is headquartered at the 1-F Military Camp in Mexico City.

Fuerza Especial de Reaccion (FER) structure is similar to its American counterpart of Delta Force, which inspired FER's formation. By 2025, police and air force units were added and the unit renamed Fuerza Especial Conjunta (Joint Special Operations Command) or FEC.

Current FEC structure:

- A Squadron (Assault)
- B Squadron (Assault)
- C Squadron (Assault)
- Support Units:
  - Special Force Unit (FE-BFP) of the Parachute Rifle Brigade
  - Special Reaction and Intervention Force (FERI-GN) of the National Guard

A, B, C, are the main assault squadrons. Each squadron is estimated to have 40-60 operators. Support units include Air Force and National Guard units that were integrated in July 31 of 2023. The newly created National Guard FERI (Fuerza Especial de Reacción y Intervención) and FE activated in 1998 and is stationed separately in Santa Lucia AFB-1, State de Mexico, where it is known as the FEBFP (Fuerza Especial de la Brigada de Fusileros Paracaidistas). An earlier forerunner of the unit was known as Grupo Aeromóvil de Fuerzas Especiales de la Brigada de Fusileros Paracaidistas (GAFE-BFP) and Grupo de Infiltración.

Within each squadron there are three teams: two assault cells for direct action and a Intelligence, surveillance, target acquisition, and reconnaissance (ISTAR) cell.

== Known operations ==
Their first major engagements took place during the Zapatista uprising in the well known "Operación Arcoiris" (Operation Rainbow), where they employed counterinsurgency tactics against the EZLN socialist guerrilla group, infiltrating and eliminating enemy targets in the jungle terrain of the southern state of Chiapas.

One of the first times its operators were seen in public was hours after the successful capture of Osiel Cárdenas Guillén as they arrived in Mexico City in 2003, during which they killed some of the elite personal security team of the drug lord; as the top leader of the Gulf Cartel at the time, Osiel was one of the most wanted men in Mexico and the United States

They were also responsible for hunting down almost all of the first generation of "Los Zetas”, (ex-GAFEs that deserted from the Mexican army to become security for the Gulf Cartel until they splintered to form their own organization) since they knew how they operated and how to counter them, it is mentioned that they located and then gunned down the first leader and co-founder of Los Zetas, Arturo Guzman Decena in the border city of Matamoros in 2002. These operations at the time, allowed the FER to enter into a very small list of special forces that had fought against other special forces (since the original Zetas were ex-GAFE).

Another known mission carried out by the FER was the capture of drug cartel leader Javier Torres Félix aka El J.T. in Culiacán, Sinaloa, January 27 of 2004. The commandos left Mexico City for Culiacán at 9:00 a.m. and returned with Félix at 6:00 p.m. that same day. Commanders had scheduled the arrest for another day but the Secretary told reporters that immediate capture was necessary. One of Félix's hitmen had killed a soldier from the Third Military Region while the soldier was on patrol at the outskirts of the town of El Tule.

They carried out the capture of the second in command of the powerful Beltrán Leyva Cartel, Alfredo Beltrán Leyva aka. "El Mochomo", in Los Mochis, Sinaloa, year 2008.

The FER was in charge of the raid that ended up with the assassination of one of the most famous Sinaloa Cartel leaders, Ignacio "Nacho" Coronel, the operation took place in the luxury suburb of Zapopan, Jalisco during the year 2010.

The unit experienced its darkest day in 2015, during the failed Operation "Jalisco" in which an unsuccessful attempt was made to capture the supreme leader of the CJNG, Nemesio Oseguera Cervantes, aka "El Mencho"; In the course of the operation, a FAM EC725 Super Cougar helicopter that was transporting multiple FER operators was allegedly shot down by a Russian RPG rocket launcher, fired by El Mencho's elite security group (composed by former special forces of various countries), who managed to escape in the midst of the chaos of the situation; in this event, all FER operators who were onboard in the helicopter died. At their funeral, the Mexican High Command, the Secretaries of National Defense and the Navy, as well as the President of Mexico (at the time), Enrique Peña Nieto, could be seen attending the ceremony.

In the same year of 2015, through detailed month surveillance they successfully located and captured the highly violent Los Zetas cartel leader, Omar Treviño Morales, in a luxury neighborhood in San Pedro Garza García, Nuevo León.

On August 2, 2020, José Antonio Yépez Ortiz (El Marro), main leader of the Santa Rosa de Lima Cartel (CSRL), was captured by the FER. Footage from the Federal AIC GEO and Guanajuato's own AIC State agents involved in the capture showcase alleged FER members in the operation.

They have been involved non-stop in many other captures and assassinations of cartel leaders, performing many clandestine operations and it's rumored that they have even operated in foreign soil in the Central American region where they have hunted down Zetas leaders in the past.

One of FER's most recent interventions took place at dawn on January 5, 2023, where, in a joint-operation with the F.E. B.F.P., elements of the SEDENA Special Forces Corps and National Guard troops; assault teams of the FER and the F.E. B.F.P. were deployed to a ranch located in the community of Jesús María, Sinaloa, where they managed to recapture the well-known drug trafficker Ovidio Guzman Lopez, aka. "El Ratón" after wiping out his personal security group (Los Ninis) during fierce engagements, shortly after the capture there were multiple violent acts throughout the state of Sinaloa as a retaliation from the CDS, during the operation some FER operators were KIA.

== See also ==
- (United States) - 7th Special Forces Group (Airborne)
- (United States) - Joint Special Operations Command (JSOC)
- (Mexico) - Special Forces (FES)
