= Brigada de Fusileros Paracaidistas =

Mexican Army's premier airborne light infantry unit

Parachute Riflemen Brigade
- Brigada de Fusileros Paracaidistas
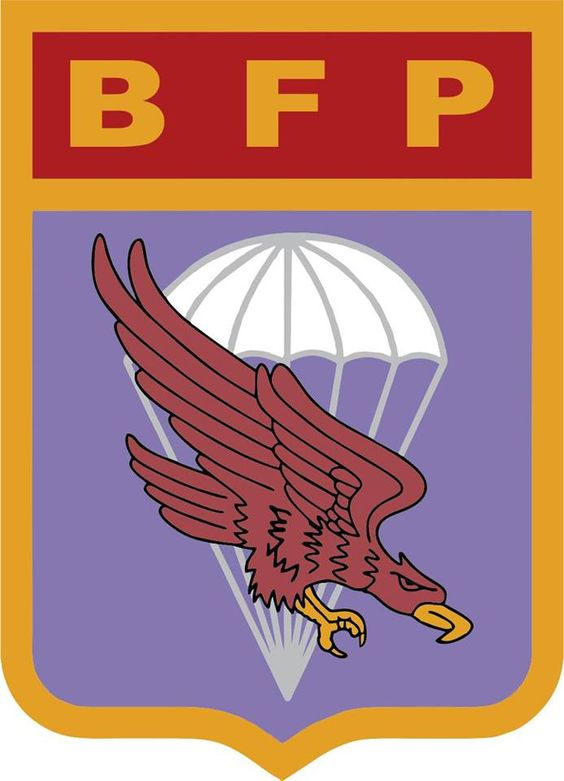
- BFP insignia
- Founded: 1946
- Country: Mexico
- Branch: Mexican Army
- Type: Paratrooper
- Role: Airborne infantry
- Size: Headquarters; 3 Parachute Riflemen Battalions; 1 Parachute Rifle Special Forces Group; 1 Logistics Company
- Colors: Maroon
- Engagements: Mexican drug war

Commanders
- Current commander: Classified
- Notable commanders: Classified

The Brigada de Fusileros Paracaidistas (English: Parachute Riflemen Brigade, lit. 'Brigade of Parachute Troopers'), also known as Chutes, is the Mexican Army premier airborne light infantry unit similar to the 75th Ranger Regiment and the British SFSG. The unit acts as support for combat operations of SEDENA's EMCDN SMUs such as FEBFP or FER.

The brigade is currently headquartered at Santa Lucia Mexican Air Force Base N-1, State of Mexico and is composed of a headquarters company, one special missions unit (operationally under EMCDN command), a logistics company, an airborne training center, and three parachute riflemen battalions.

== History ==
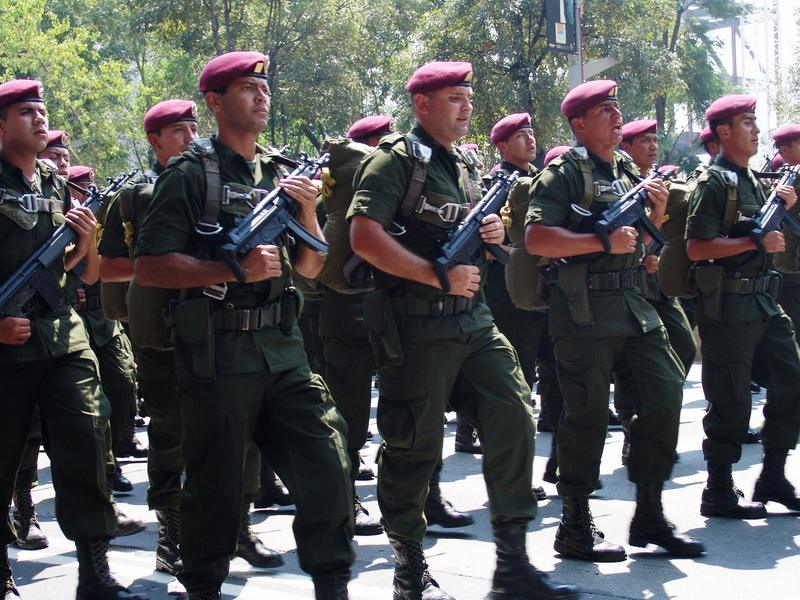
Parachute Rifle Brigade during a parade in Mexico City to commemorate the start of the War for Independence, 16 September 2007.

The Brigade's origin dates back to 1946 when Divisional General Francisco L. Urquizo and Director of Aeronautics Divisional General Gustavo Salinas Camiña elaborated a program to create the country's first Paratrooper unit. The plan consisted of sending a group of officers and regular servicemen to Fort Benning, Georgia to be trained as paratroopers. By July 20, 1946, the first group under the command of Captain Albarrán López graduated paratrooper school, and the second group under the command of Cavalry Lieutenant Jorge Munguía González graduated in the same year on August 3.

The new unit was based in Balbuena Military Camp, carrying out their first jump over Mexican territory on September 15, 1946. In the same year, the army moved the unit to its new Headquarters in Puebla, Puebla giving them the designation of "Compañía Mínima de Aerotropas" ( Minimum Airtrooper Company ). On February 15, 1947, the unit was reorganized into the "Compañía de Aerotropas" ( Airtrooper Company ) and re-established in Military Camp No.1 in the Federal District. By 1969, the Brigada de Fusileros Paracaidistas was created and organized with three battalions, and one special forces group that was integrated in 1998.

== Structure ==
- Headquarters Company
- 1st Infantry Parachute Rifle Battalion (1 BFP)
- 2nd Infantry Parachute Rifle Battalion (2 BFP)
- 3rd Infantry Parachute Rifle Battalion (3 BFP)
- Special Force Unit (FE-BFP)
- Logistics Company
- Airborne Training Center

== See also ==
- Grupo Aeromóvil de Fuerzas Especiales
- Grupo Aeromóvil de Fuerzas Especiales del Alto Mando
- Ixtoc-Alfa
- Fuerzas Especiales
