= Fuerzas Especiales =

Special forces unit of the Mexican Navy

Special Forces
- Fuerzas Especiales
- FES insignia
- Active: 2001 - present
- Allegiance: Mexico
- Branch: Mexican Navy
- Type: Naval special operations forces
- Size: 600
- Part of: Mexican Navy Special Operations Unit (UNOPES)
- Nicknames: FES; Cuachicqueh
- Mottos: Fuerza, Espíritu, Sabiduría (lit. Strength, Spirit, Wisdom)
- Colors: Blue, Black

The Fuerzas Especiales (Special Forces), commonly known as FES, is a special operations group of the Mexican Naval Infantry Corps under the Mexican Navy. It was established in 2001.

== Structure ==
Within the Naval Infantry Corps the FES falls under the Mexican Navy Special Operations Unit (UNOPES) which additionally includes various Naval Infantry Corps commando and airborne units.

FES personnel are divided into 3 groups:

- Special Forces Group of the Gulf (FESGO)
- Special Forces Group of the Pacific (FESPA)
- Special Forces Group of the Center (FESCEN)

FESGO and FESPA each have about 220 personnel, while FESCEN has less than 160 operators, and is specialized in counter terror operations in central Mexico. FES personnel are capable of carrying out non-conventional warfare in the air, sea and land, using all means of infiltration available to develop the most variable operational incursions with the use of military diving techniques, parachuting, vertical descent, urban combat, sniping and use of explosives. The units are well organized, trained and equipped to operate independently in maritime, lake, riverine or terrestrial scenarios.

== Operations ==
The FES has played a major active role in the war against international cartels by undertaking direct action missions, intelligence gathering, reconnaissance operations, weapons and facility seizures, kill or capture missions with support from U.S. government agencies such as the DEA.

Some of their most known operations are as follows:

1. Operation Cuerno III. The raid and elimination of the leader of the Beltran Leyva Cartel, Arturo Beltran Leyva, in Cuernavaca, Morelos in December 2009.
2. Elimination of Gulf Cartel leader Antonio Cárdenas Guillén aka "Tony Tormenta" in Matamoros, Mexico, 2010. 3 marines KIA during the firefight with his close protection circle of gunmen known as "Los Escorpiones". Heavy fire, grenades and road blockades were implemented by the cartel gunmen that day.
3. In 2012 during a successful operation Zetas cartel regional boss Iván Velázquez Caballero aka ''El Talibán'' was captured in San Luis Potosi.
4. In 2013 special operations personnel with support from the US government was able to track down with a drone & capture Zetas cartel top boss, Miguel Ángel Treviño, aka Z-40, in Nuevo Laredo
5. On February 22, 2014, El Chapo Guzman was captured in Mazatlán, Mexico, by FES teams.
6. Operation Black Swan. During a joint US-Mexico operation, Joaquín "El Chapo" Guzmán, was captured in Los Mochis, Sinaloa in 2016. Guzman Loera had escaped from prison in 2015.
7. Operation Barcina. With close air support from a naval helicopter with a mounted M134 Minigun the regional boss of the Beltran Leyva Cartel, Juan Francisco Patrón aka "El H2", was eliminated in 2017 during a raid by FES teams.
8. In July 2022, they carried out the successful "Operación Leyenda II" in which they captured the pioneer drug lord Rafael Caro Quintero.

== Training ==
In order to become part of the Special Forces the contestant must pass a basic special forces course. The FES training course separated into phases, with usually 20% completion rate:

1. Introduction to Special Forces (4 weeks)
2. Parachuting (5 weeks)
3. Commando and stress tests (6 weeks)
4. Mountain operations (4 weeks)
5. Intervention/CQB (5 weeks)
6. Diving and combat diving courses (16 weeks)

After passing the basic special forces course the operator continues to receive the additional training in the following areas:

- Counter-terrorism
- Combat medicine
- VIP close protection
- Drone surveillance
- Sniper course
- VBSS operations
- HALO/HAHO parachuting
- Military intelligence
- Special Reconnaissance
- Search and rescue
- Hazardous materials handling
- Human rights awareness
- EOD

Some of the main training centers and subcenters where courses are given:

- Centro de Entrenamiento Avanzado in Valle de Bravo, Mexico
- Centro de Capacitación y Adiestramiento Especializado de Infantería de Marina (CENCAEIM) in Champotón, Mexico
- Escuela de Búsqueda, Rescate y Buceo in Acapulco, Mexico

Additional training is also given to FES operators in the United States.

== Weaponry ==
- SIG-516 GEN-12
- SIG MPX COPPERHEAD
- SIG MCX Virtus
- M4 Carbine
- FN P90
- H&K UMP
- PSG-1
- M249 Squad Automatic Weapon
- Glock 17
- SIG Sauer P226 MK25
- M203 grenade launcher
- M60E6
- SIG Sauer P320 Compact
- Milkor MGL
- SIG Sauer P365 9mm Pistol
- M72 LAW

== See also ==
- Mexico- Fuerza Especial Conjunta
- United Kingdom- Special Boat Service
- United States- Navy SEALs - NSWDG
- United States- Marine Raider Regiment
