= 2026 Jalisco operation =

Mexican anti-drug trafficking operation in Jalisco

- Part of the Mexican drug war
- An alleged cartel gunman lighting a fire at a gas station
Date	22 February 2026
Location	Tapalpa, Jalisco, Mexico
Result	Mexican government victory: El Mencho killed during military operations; 2026 Mexico cartel unrest

Belligerents
Mexico; Supported by: United States (Note: The U.S. government obtained intelligence about the drug cartel through the Joint Interagency Task Force-Counter Cartel (JITF-CC) and informed Mexican authorities.)	Jalisco New Generation Cartel

Commanders and leaders
Claudia Sheinbaum; (Mexico) Ricardo Trevilla Trejo; (Mexico) Omar García Harfuch	El Mencho †; Rubén Guerrero Valadez †

Units involved
(Mexico) Secretariat of National Defense; Joint Special Operations Command (FEC); Mexican Army; Brigada de Fusileros Paracaidistas; Mexican Air Force; National Guard	Jalisco New Generation Cartel

Casualties and losses
3 killed	7 killed, 2 arrested

On 22 February 2026, the Mexican Armed Forces conducted an operation which killed El Mencho, the leader of the Jalisco New Generation Cartel (CJNG), and six others in Tapalpa, Jalisco, Mexico. The operation sparked clashes in the area, resulting in shootouts, explosions and multiple vehicles and stores being set on fire throughout the state and much of the rest of the country. The clashes resulted in dozens of casualties for both the National Guard and cartel members, as well as at least one civilian death.

== Background ==
The Mexican drug war is an ongoing asymmetric armed conflict between the Mexican government and various drug trafficking syndicates. When the Mexican military intervened in 2006, the government's main objective was to reduce drug-related violence. The government has asserted that its primary focus is on dismantling the cartels and preventing drug trafficking. The conflict has been described as the Mexican theater of the global war on drugs, as led by the United States federal government. Analysts estimate wholesale earnings from illicit drug sales range from US$13.6 to US$49.4 billion annually.

=== Rise of the Jalisco New Generation Cartel within Mexico ===
CJNG started in 2009 as a splinter group of the Milenio Cartel, the other being La Resistencia. CJNG defeated La Resistencia and took control of Milenio's smuggling networks. CJNG expanded its operation network from coast to coast in six months, making it one of the criminal groups with the greatest operating capacity by 2012. Following the emergence of the cartel, homicides, kidnappings and discoveries of mass graves spiked in Jalisco. By 2018, the CJNG was believed to have over 100 methamphetamine labs throughout Mexico. Based on average street value, its trade could net upwards of $8 billion for cocaine and $4.6 billion for crystal meth each year. The CJNG are fighting the Nueva Plaza Cartel for control of Guadalajara; La Unión Tepito for Mexico City; Los Viagras and La Familia Michoacana for the states of Michoacán and Guerrero; Los Zetas in the states of Veracruz and Puebla; Cártel del Noreste in Zacatecas; the Sinaloa Cartel in Baja California, Sonora, Ciudad Juárez, Zacatecas and Chiapas; as well as the Santa Rosa de Lima Cartel in Guanajuato. They have an alliance with the Cártel del Golfo in Zacatecas and La Línea in Juárez.

CJNG is considered by the Mexican government to be one of the most dangerous criminal organizations in Mexico and the most powerful drug cartel in Mexico. It is also considered the cartel with the most paramilitary firepower. CJNG is heavily militarized and more violent than other criminal organizations. It has a special operations group known as the Grupo Élite for specific types of warfare. Its hitman training program is strict and professional. The cartel is best known for its fights against the Zetas and Templarios, it has fought La Resistencia for control of Aguililla, Michoacán, and its surrounding territories.

=== Previous efforts to capture Oseguera ===
In August 2012, Mexican federal forces carried out operations in the municipalities of Zapopan and Tonaya aimed at capturing Oseguera. Between 25 and 27 August, local and national media outlets reported that Oseguera had been detained, prompting a wave of road blockades and vehicle burnings across the Guadalajara metropolitan area and parts of Jalisco and Colima. Federal authorities later denied that a formal arrest had taken place.

On 1 May 2015, Mexican federal authorities launched a large-scale security operation in and around Villa Purificación as part of a broader offensive against the Jalisco New Generation Cartel (CJNG). Officials stated that the operation aimed to dismantle CJNG infrastructure and apprehend senior leaders, including Oseguera. During the operation, a military helicopter providing aerial support was struck by rocket-propelled grenade fire from suspected CJNG gunmen after locating an armed convoy, killing nine soldiers. CJNG also launched coordinated retaliatory attacks across Jalisco and neighboring states, including road blockades, vehicle burnings, and armed confrontations with security forces in order to prevent Oseguera's capture.

== Execution of the operation ==
=== Intelligence and planning ===
The operation was led by the Mexican Army with support from the National Guard, the Mexican Air Force, and intelligence personnel from the Attorney General's Office. Mexican security forces coordinated with the United States' Joint Interagency Task Force-Counter Cartel (JIATF-CC), which provided intelligence support in the planning of the mission. The JIATF-CC mapped cartel presence and provided intelligence on CJNG movements, which the task force's director, Brigadier General Maurizio Calabrese, said were unlike those of the Islamic State or al-Qaeda.

In the days immediately preceding the operation, military intelligence tracked the movements of a trusted associate connected to a romantic partner of Oseguera. On 20 February 2026, data from this surveillance indicated that the associate had transported the partner to a residence within the Tapalpa Country Club, an upscale gated residential development in the municipality of Tapalpa, Jalisco, where Oseguera was believed to be staying. Security forces confirmed that the partner met with Oseguera at the property before departing on 21 February. Continued monitoring suggested that Oseguera remained at the residence with a relatively small security detail, reportedly numbering around ten bodyguards.

The security forces began planning the operation on 21 February, which involved ground forces, aviation support, and special operations units, aimed at apprehending and extracting Oseguera. As part of these preparations, six military helicopters were deployed in states adjacent to Jalisco in the hours before the assault.

=== Raid on Oseguera's Tapalpa compound ===
On 22 February 2026, after confirming Oseguera's presence, security forces initiated the raid on foot on the gated community in Tapalpa. The assault was aided by two military helicopters. As federal troops advanced toward the property, CJNG gunmen opened fire, triggering an intense exchange of gunfire in the surrounding mountainous terrain. Cartel members used high-caliber firearms and other heavy weaponry in an attempt to repel the assault. During the initial confrontation, several cartel members were killed and others wounded as security forces moved to secure the compound.

Amid the firefight, Oseguera attempted to escape into the surrounding terrain with four members of his security detail. A team of Special Forces personnel split off and pursued him beyond the main structure, leading to a second armed confrontation in the nearby wooded area. During this exchange, cartel gunmen continued firing at advancing troops, and a military helicopter providing aerial support was struck by gunfire, forcing it to make an emergency landing in nearby Sayula. Security forces ultimately located Oseguera hidden in the surrounding forest's undergrowth and engaged his accompanying security detail, during which he was critically wounded. Following the firefight, security forces secured the site and seized armoured vehicles, seven long firearms, two rocket launchers, and other tactical equipment.

==== Death of Oseguera ====
Security forces called for the arrival of a helicopter to transfer the gravely injured Oseguera, along with two injured cartel bodyguards and a wounded soldier, to Guadalajara for emergency medical treatment. However, Oseguera and the two cartel members died during the flight. Due to security concerns over the risk of further violent actions by CJNG members in the capital of Jalisco, officials decided to divert the aircraft to Morelia International Airport instead of continuing to Guadalajara. There, an Air Force aircraft was prepared to transport the bodies to Mexico City. According to Defense Secretary Ricardo Trevilla Trejo, a total of eight CJNG members were killed in the military operation to capture Oseguera.

== Aftermath ==
=== Retaliatory violence ===
In the immediate aftermath of the operation, the Jalisco New Generation Cartel (CJNG) launched coordinated retaliatory attacks across multiple states. Cartel members established approximately 250 roadblocks nationwide using hijacked cargo trucks, buses, and private vehicles that were set on fire to obstruct highways and urban roads. Incidents were reported in Jalisco and numerous other states, including Michoacán, Guanajuato, Colima, Tamaulipas, Zacatecas, Aguascalientes, and Sinaloa. In the Guadalajara metropolitan area alone, authorities confirmed at least 20 active blockade points on 22 February. The largest wave of retaliatory attacks occurred the same day, within hours of the operation, and by the evening of 23 February federal authorities reported that roughly 90 percent of the approximately 250 roadblocks had been cleared, although several blockades and partial highway closures remained active as authorities worked to clear debris and restore traffic.

The violence included widespread arson attacks against businesses, gas stations, and public infrastructure. In Guanajuato, more than 70 attacks were recorded across multiple municipalities, including dozens of arson incidents affecting commercial establishments such as Banco del Bienestar branches and Oxxo convenience stores. In Jalisco, explosive devices were used in attacks targeting National Guard facilities, including a vehicle-borne improvised explosive device that damaged a base and a car bomb in San Juan de los Lagos that killed Captain Leonel Cardoso Gómez and injured several officers. Armed assailants also attacked a National Guard base in Teocaltiche and a prison in Ixtapa, Jalisco, where 23 inmates escaped following an assault that left a custodial officer dead.

The unrest caused significant transportation disruptions. Public bus and urban rail services in the Guadalajara metropolitan area were temporarily suspended, and long-distance bus departures to western states were cancelled due to highway closures. At Puerto Vallarta International Airport, most international and many domestic flights were suspended amid security concerns and blocked access routes.

Federal authorities deployed additional military and National Guard forces to restore order in the affected regions. In the days following the clashes, at least 25 National Guard personnel were reported killed in separate attacks, along with a Jalisco state prosecutor's agent and one civilian, while dozens of suspected cartel members were also reported killed and multiple arrests were carried out.

=== Investigations ===
Federal authorities confirmed the arrest of two alleged members of the Jalisco New Generation Cartel (CJNG), who were described as members of Oseguera's security detail. The Attorney General's Office (FGR) charged both men with possession of firearms and equipment reserved for the exclusive use of the armed forces. On 1 March, a federal judge ordered that they be held in pretrial detention and transferred to the Federal Social Readaptation Center No. 1.

On 15 March, personnel of the Mexican Army and the National Guard arrested José "N", alias "El Pepé", in Tlajomulco de Zúñiga. Authorities identified him as the associate who was involved in transporting Oseguera's romantic partner to Tapalapa.

==== Investigation into alleged financial records ====
On 26 February, El Universal reported that authorities had seized accounting documents allegedly belonging to the CJNG, referred to in media coverage as a "narconómina". According to the report, the documents detailed payments to cartel members, including regional operators, gunmen, and lookouts, as well as expenditures related to logistics and security, and contained references to alleged payments to municipal police officers and other public officials. Secretary of Security and Citizen Protection Omar García Harfuch stated that the FGR was investigating the authenticity of the documents, adding that no elected officials had been formally implicated at that time, though authorities were reviewing potential links involving police or other local officials named in the records.

=== Handling of the body ===
Oseguera's body arrived at Mexico City International Airport (AICM) on 22 February before being taken under heavy security to the Specialized Prosecutor's Office for Organized Crime (FEMDO). The next day, the Attorney General's Office (FGR) confirmed that the body was identified genetically after forensic analysis. Authorities stated that the body would remain in federal custody pending completion of legal formalities and verification of any request by relatives to claim the remains.

On 25 February, the FGR confirmed that the remains had been formally claimed by a legal representative of Oseguera's family, and that procedures were underway to release the body in accordance with federal law. On 28 February, the FGR confirmed that Oseguera's body had been formally released to his legal representative. Oseguera was buried in Zapopan following an elaborate funeral ceremony on 3 March that saw him interred in a golden casket.

=== CJNG leadership succession ===
Due to his son Rubén Oseguera González ("El Menchito") being imprisoned in the United States, Oseguera did not have a direct successor upon his death. David Mora, a member of the International Crisis Group, said this would cause a power vacuum and could cause "violent realignments within the organization". In the weeks following Oseguera's death, intelligence and media reports identified several senior CJNG figures as possible contenders for the cartel's leadership, including Audias Flores Silva ("El Jardinero"), Ricardo Ruiz Velasco ("El R2"), Juan Carlos Valencia González ("El 03"), Hugo Gonzalo Mendoza Gaytán ("El Sapo"), and Heraclio Guerrero Martínez ("El Tío Lako").

By March and April 2026, reports by the Wall Street Journal and El Pais identified Valencia González, who was Oseguera's stepson through his marriage to Rosalinda González Valencia, as the cartel's emerging leader. Mexican and U.S. authorities reportedly viewed him as the most likely successor to head the organization following the power struggle that followed Oseguera's death.

Despite these reports, succession disputes within the CJNG reportedly continued. Following the capture of Flores Silva on 27 April 2026, Mexican authorities alleged that he had been mobilizing "personnel, weapons and resources" in an attempt to seize control of the organization.

== See also ==
- Death of Pablo Escobar – Killing of the Colombian cartel leader in 1993 during a joint operation by Colombian security forces
- Battle of Culiacán – Failed capture of Ovidio Guzmán in 2019, initially successfully captured, gunfights and kidnappings by Sinaloa Cartel members resulted in his release by the Mexican government.
- 2016 recapture of El Chapo – U.S.–Mexican joint operation resulting in the recapture of Sinaloa Cartel leader Joaquín "El Chapo" Guzmán after a gunfight in Los Mochis, Sinaloa
- Capture of El Mayo – 2024 abduction of Sinaloa Cartel co-founder Ismael "El Mayo" Zambada by a son of Joaquín "El Chapo" Guzmán, who delivered him to U.S. agents in New Mexico; it set off years of infighting within the cartel
- Capture of Nicolás Maduro – Capture of the Venezuelan president in 2026 during a military operation by United States special forces
