= Martín Arzola Ortega =

Mexican criminal (1976/77-2019)

- Born: 1976 or 1977; Guadalajara, Jalisco, Mexico
- Died: 31 July 2019 (aged 42); Zapopan, Jalisco, Mexico
- Cause of death: Homicide by firearm
- Other names: El 53; Ramón Franco Zavala
- Occupation: Drug lord
- Employer: Jalisco New Generation Cartel
- Criminal charges: Drug trafficking; Organized crime involvement; Possession of military-exclusive firearms
- Criminal status: 24-year conviction (2015); overturned to 4-years and released (2018)

Martín Arzola Ortega (Latin American Spanish: [maɾˈtin aɾˈsola oɾˈteɣa]; 1976 or 1977 – 31 July 2019), commonly referred to by his alias "El 53", was a Mexican convicted drug lord and former high-ranking leader of the Jalisco New Generation Cartel (CJNG). He worked under Nemesio Oseguera Cervantes (alias "El Mencho"), the former leader of the CJNG. Arzola Ortega began his criminal career in 1998 as a cargo truck thief and eventually joined the Milenio Cartel, the predecessor group of the CJNG. After several of his bosses were arrested and/or killed, he founded the CJNG with other defectors in the 2010s.

Arzola Ortega was responsible for leading a squad of assassins in multiple municipalities across Jalisco to fight off rival cartel groups. He used a network of police officers to gather intelligence and facilitate his drug-related activities. In 2011, he was arrested by the Mexican Federal Police and charged with drug trafficking, organized crime involvement, and possession of military-exclusive firearms. He was sentenced to 24 years in prison in 2015, and was serving his sentence at the Federal Social Readaptation Center No. 1, a maximum-security prison in the State of Mexico. He was released in late 2018 after one of his sentences was overturned and he was credited with time served. In 2019, he was killed by a teenage gunman in Jalisco.

== Early life and career ==
Martín Arzola Ortega, commonly referred to by his alias El 53, was a born in Guadalajara, Jalisco, Mexico, on 1976 or 1977. (Note: His date of birth was calculated based on his age (34) at the day of his arrest, 15 July 2011.) He had other aliases like El Gordo (English: Fatty), El Señor (English: Sir), and El Negro (English: The Black One). Arzola Ortega started his criminal career in 1998 by stealing cargo trucks. He was arrested and sentenced to eight months for this crime. Upon his release from prison, he continued his criminal activity and joined the Milenio Cartel, a criminal group based in Michoacán. While he was in the Milenio Cartel, the criminal group worked closely with the Sinaloa Cartel, a criminal group based in Sinaloa, and specifically with one of their suspected leaders, Ignacio "Nacho" Coronel Villarreal. The Milenio Cartel was headed by Óscar Orlando Nava Valencia (alias "El Lobo", Spanish for "The Wolf"), who had close ties with Coronel Villarreal.

In the late 2000s, several members of the Milenio Cartel were arrested and/or killed by security forces, which prompted an organizational rupture in the criminal group. On 28 October 2009, El Lobo was arrested by the Army in Guadalajara. Several months later on 9 May 2010, security forces arrested Juan Carlos Nava Valencia (alias "El Tigre", Spanish for "The Tiger") and his sister Jacqueline Patricia Nava Valencia in Guadalajara. Later that year, Coronel Villarreal was killed in a clash with the Mexican Army. The power vacuum left by Coronel Villarreal's death prompted an internal war within the Milenio Cartel; on one front, Arzola Ortega, Érick Valencia Salazar (alias "El 85"), and Nemesio Oseguera Cervantes (alias "El Mencho") wanted to command the Milenio Cartel. The other front, which sided against Arzola Ortega and his accomplices, was headed by Elpidio Mojarro Ramírez (alias "El Pilo") and Víctor Manuel Torres García (alias "El Papirrín"). Arzola Ortega and his faction eventually founded in the 2010s a new criminal group, the Jalisco New Generation Cartel (CJNG), while the other group of Milenio defectors founded another group, La Resistencia.

According to Mexico's Secretariat of Public Security (SSP), Arzola Ortega was a high-ranking CJNG member in the Jalisco municipalities of Guadalajara, Zapopan, Tonalá, Tlaquepaque, and Tlajomulco de Zúñiga. The SSP accused him of being responsible for managing the CJNG's drug distribution in Guadalajara metropolitan area. The SSP stated that he reported directly to El Mencho, the suspected top leader of the CJNG. To operate without being detected by his rivals, he used the alias Ramón Franco Zavala. Federal investigators said that Arzola Ortega had a network of corrupt police officers working for him who provided intelligence and helped facilitate his drug operations.

== Arrest and imprisonment ==
On 13 July 2011, the Mexican Federal Police (PF) arrested Arzola Ortega in Tlajomulco de Zúñiga following a large operative conducted by the PF in the Guadalajara metropolitan area that was launched to apprehend him. At the crime scene, authorities found a .38 Super handgun, an Uzi 9 mm, radio communication equipment, and several unspecified documents. Arzola Ortega was arrested alongside an accomplice, Erick José Alcázar Limón (alias "El Niño", Spanish for "The Kid"), who was responsible for transporting money derived from illegal activities, and identifying members and safe houses owned by La Resistencia to Arzola Ortega. The Deputy Attorney General's Office for Specialized Investigation of Organized Crime (SIEDO), Mexico's former organized crime investigatory agency, confirmed that Arzola Ortega and Alcázar Limón had active arrest warrants that were issued on 25 August 2011.

On 19 July 2011, a federal judge granted Mexico's Office of the General Prosecutor (PGR) a 40-day preventative arrest against Arzola Ortega for organized crime and illegal possession of firearm charges. He remained in the custody of the PGR during that period, a measure that was also applied to his associate, Alcázar Limón. Once the preventative arrest concluded, a federal judge ordered both men to be transferred to prison on 5 September 2011. The judge confirmed that a trial against them would begin after the transfer concluded. Arzola Ortega was sent to the Federal Social Readaptation Center No. 1 (also known as "Altiplano"), a maximum-security prison in Almoloya de Juárez, State of Mexico. Alcázar Limón was transferred to the Federal Social Readaptation Center No. 5, a maximum-security prison in Villa Aldama, Veracruz. In 2016, Arzola Ortega was transferred to the Federal Social Readaptation Center No. 13, a maximum-security prison in Miahuatlán de Porfirio Díaz, Oaxaca. After his defense team filed a motion that was granted, he was returned to Altiplano in 2017.

On 28 March 2018, several inmates at Altiplano, (Note: Among the inmates who issued the complaint were Vicente Carrillo Fuentes of the Juárez Cartel; Sidronio Casarrubias Salgado of Guerreros Unidos, and José Noé Barajas Esquivel of the Knights Templar Cartel.) including Arzola Ortega, protested to the Office of the Federal Prosecutor for the Consumer (PROFECO) for the price increase of potato chips, hygiene products, and paper in the prison's store. In the complaint, the inmates stated that since October 2017, a Cheetos bag of 255 grams (9.0 oz) used to cost MXN$42 (US$2.2) and increased to MXN$60.50 (US$3.2); the price of a Doritos bag went from MXN$48 (US$2.55) to MXN$62 (US$3.3). The inmates and their families also complained that prisoners had no other option but to buy the junk food offered at the prison's store because of food shortage and poor diet options offered by the prison. They said it was unfair that the prison was "monopolizing" the prices and selling them goods at whatever price they wanted.

== Conviction and release ==
On 9 December 2015, Arzola Ortega was sentenced to 24 years in prison by a federal court based in Toluca, State of Mexico. His charges were organized crime involvement, drug trafficking, and possession of military-exclusive weapons. Alcázar Limón, the accomplice who was arrested with him, received the same charges and a 13-year conviction. In addition, Arzola Ortega received a minimum wage sentence of 600 days, meaning that he would have to pay MXN$34,878 (US$2,055) in fines. Alcázar Limón received a 300-day minimum wage sentence, which equaled MXN$17,439.00 (US$1,028) in fines. The court confirmed that when Arzola Ortega was arrested, his defense team issued multiple case revision requests and writs of amparo. Several courts received the requests made by his defense, but none of them were granted in his favor. With this result, the court in Toluca decided to render a solution and issued the sentence.

In 2017, the PGR began a legal process to seize properties owned by Arzola Ortega, Alcázar Limón, and other suspected CJNG members and strawpersons. According to court files, Arzola Ortega and Alcázar Limón owned two properties in Guadalajara that authorities suspected were acquired from drug proceeds. The first one was in the Cruz del Sur neighborhood, and was valued at MXN$1.78 million property; the second property was in the Vicente Guerrero neighborhood and was valued at MXN$876,250. (Note: The other suspected CJNG members that the PGR tried to seize properties from were José Serna Padilla (alias "El Zopilote"), Julio César Chávez López (alias "El Antiguo"), José Bernabé Brizuela Meraz (alias "La Vaca"), Lorena Sánchez Rodríguez, César Cazarín Molina (alias "El Comandante Tornado"), and Rubén Oseguera González (alias "El Menchito"). Both Brizuela Meraz and Sánchez Rodríguez were originally identified by other sources as members of La Línea, a gang of the Juárez Cartel. Cazarín Molina was also known as Iván Cazarín Molina and Víctor Hugo Delgado Rentería. He also had an alternate alias, "El Tanque".)

In September 2018, Arzola Ortega was released from prison. The reasons for his release were not publicly known at the time, but federal authorities confirmed after his death that Arzola Ortega's defense team appealed the sentence when it was officiated. In 2016, a court ordered the case to be revisited. An appeals court magistrate rejected the judge's verdict in 2018 after considering that the PGR did not have sufficient evidence against Arzola Ortega, thus reverting the 24-year sentence. The only criminal charge Arzola Ortega kept was illegal possession of firearms, which was a four-year conviction. Since he had already been in prison for more than four years, he was released.

== Death ==
At 16:20 hours on 31 July 2019, Arzola Ortega was killed inside a Carl's Jr. restaurant in the Plaza Galerías mall in Zapopan. According to preliminary police reports, two assailants went inside the restaurant to kill Arzola Ortega, who was eating with his aunt and nephew. After killing him, one of the gunmen began shooting at the rest of the people inside the restaurant. The customers took cover under the tables while the gunmen shot at them. Several people were wounded in the attack.

María Luisa Aguirre Solís, the wife of Governor of Nayarit Antonio Echevarría García, was coincidentally eating with her two children in the same restaurant. When the shootout began, her bodyguards responded to the attack and killed one of the assailants. Jalisco authorities stated that the bodyguards killed the shooter to protect the lives of the people inside the restaurant. The following morning, a lady who identified as Arzola Ortega's wife reclaimed the body at the Forensic Medical Services (SEMEFO). She confirmed that Arzola Ortega was 42 years old. The assailant who was killed at the scene remained unidentified for several days since he was not carrying any identification. Jalisco's security coordinator Macedonio Salomón Támez Guajardo told the press that law enforcement officers were on alert for any possible violent reactions from organized crime groups.

On 9 August, Jalisco state authorities confirmed that the suspect killed in the incident had been identified as Bryan Alexander, a 17-year-old hitman employed by the CJNG, and that he was responsible for Arzola Ortega's murder. He was positively identified by his mother, who confirmed his identity to law enforcement.

== See also ==
- Mexican drug war
