= Uruapan arcade shooting =

2020 mass shooting in Uruapan, Mexico

- Part of Mexican drug war
- Location: Calle Josefa Ortiz de Dominguez, Uruapan, Michoacán, Mexico
- Date: February 3, 2020
- Deaths: 9
- Injuries: 2
- Perpetrator: Jalisco New Generation Cartel

On February 3, 2020, suspected CJNG cartel members shot up an arcade in Uruapan, Michoacán, Mexico, killing nine people, including four children.

== Background ==
Uruapan has been the center of a territorial dispute between the Jalisco-based Jalisco New Generation Cartel (CJNG) and the Los Viagras cartel based in Michoacán, where Uruapan is located. Reprisal attacks and public killings have been commonplace in the city, and in August 2019, nineteen bodies were disposed of on the road near Uruapan. On the weekend before the arcade shooting, the graves of eleven people were discovered nearby. A police station was also attacked by gunmen in retaliation for the arrest of a Los Viagras member. Just a day prior to the shooting, Los Viagras members released a video showing off weapons they threatened to use against CJNG.

== Shooting ==
Four armed men walked into the arcade on February 3, looking for Los Viagras members. The arcade, located on Josefa Ortiz de Dominguez street, was a site commonly used by Los Viagras members to sell drugs. The men asked questions to people gaming at the arcade regarding the whereabouts of "El Ruso" and "The Bald One". When the gunmen couldn't find who they were looking for, they shot sporadically throughout the arcade. The weapons shot 9mm bullets, and sixty-five ballistic elements were discovered by Mexican authorities. Nine people were killed in the shooting, including a 12-year-old, a thirteen-year-old, a fourteen-year-old, a seventeen-year-old, and an eighteen-year-old. Two others were injured in the attack.

== Aftermath ==
Families of the victims were not hopeful in Michoacán authorities in detaining the perpetrators. Following the shooting, the war between CJNG and Los Viagras intensified in the Uruapan area.
