= Juan Carlos Valencia González =

American drug lord (born 1984)

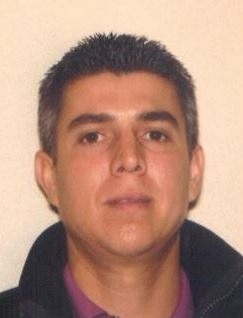
- Born: Juan Carlos Valencia; September 12, 1984 (age 42); Santa Ana, California, U.S.
- Other names: El Pelón; El 03; El R-3; Tricky Tres
- Occupation: Drug Lord
- Organization: Jalisco New Generation Cartel
- Height: 1.75 m (5 ft 9 in)
- Predecessor: Nemesio Rubén Oseguera Cervantes
- Parent(s): Armando Valencia Cornelio; Rosalinda González Valencia
- Relatives: El Mencho (stepfather); Rubén Oseguera González (half-brother); Abigael González Valencia (uncle); Armando Valencia Cornelio (great-uncle, in addition to being father)
- Criminal charges: Drug trafficking, illegal possession of firearms, extortion, money laundering, kidnapping, criminal forfeiture
- Reward amount: $25 million
- Capture status: Fugitive
- Wanted by: (Mexico) FGR (United States) DEA, DOS

Juan Carlos Valencia González, photo from his DEA wanted poster

Juan Carlos Valencia (born 12 September 1984), also known by the aliases El 03 ("El Tres") and El Pelón, is a Mexican-American drug lord and the current leader of the Jalisco New Generation Cartel (CJNG). The Jalisco New Generation Cartel has been designated as a terrorist organization by the United States government.

Following the death of his stepfather and CJNG leader Nemesio Rubén Oseguera Cervantes ("El Mencho"), Valencia González has been given the control of the CJNG.

According to statements attributed to former Mexican Secretary of National Defense Luis Cresencio Sandoval, Valencia González is believed to have founded and coordinated the Grupo Élite, one of the principal armed wings of CJNG, in 2019. The group has operated in the states of Michoacán, Zacatecas, and Guanajuato, where it has reportedly engaged in conflicts with rival criminal groups.

== Early life ==
Valencia was born in Santa Ana, California. He is the son of Armando Valencia Cornelio (alias "El Maradona") (b. 1959), (Note: Valencia Gonzalez's biological father was confirmed to be in poor health by 2020. Armando Valencia Gonzalez had been arrested by security forces in 2003 in Guadalajara, Jalisco, and was convicted and sentenced to 47 years in prison for drug trafficking in 2010. Though he would be released from prison early in 2020, he was by that point in time confirmed to be suffering from cancer. By March 2026, Valencia' Gonzalez's father was still described as having only been a leader in the Milenio Cartel, which served as a predecessor to the CJNG. In April 2026, it was also confirmed that Armando's "lucrative relationship" with drug trafficking ended with his 2003 arrest.) a co-founder of the defunct Milenio Cartel, and Rosalinda González Valencia, a former financial operator for the CJNG. He became the stepson of El Mencho through his mother's later relationship with him.

In November 2021, it was reported that his mother was also the niece of Armando Valencia Cornelio. In spite of this, Armando is acknowledged to also be Valencia González's biological father, making Valencia González the product of an incestuous relationship.

After the 2015 arrest and extradition of Rubén Oseguera González ("El Menchito"), who had been considered a principal heir to the CJNG leadership, Valencia González was identified by media outlets as one of the possible successors within the organization.

== Criminal activities ==
Valencia González reportedly became involved in drug trafficking at a young age. According to the Department of Justice, he was involved in trafficking cocaine and methamphetamine into the US, as well as weapons. With his biological father being imprisoned in 2003, and never managing to resume his "lucrative relationship" with drug trafficking, much of Valencia González's rise would be through others in his mother's "Valencia clan" family and through his mother's marriage to El Mencho.

He has been identified as a suspect in the 2016 kidnapping of Iván Archivaldo Guzmán Salazar ("El Chapito") and Jesús Alfredo Guzmán Salazar at a restaurant in Puerto Vallarta. The two were later released.

On 8 October 2020, he was indicted in the United States District Court for the District of Columbia on charges of conspiracy to distribute controlled substances, firearms offenses, and criminal forfeiture.

== Reward ==
The United States Department of State has announced a reward of up to US$25 million for information leading to the arrest and conviction of Valencia González.

== Leader of CJNG ==
On March 18, 2026, the Wall Street Journal reported that Juan Carlos Valencia González was now the CJNG's new leader. On April 6, 2026, El Pais would also confirm Valencia Gonzalez becoming head of the CJNG, having successfully worked his way through the power vacuum created by El Mencho's death in February 2026.

== See also ==
- Jessica Johanna Oseguera González
- Laisha Michelle Oseguera González
- Hugo César Macías Ureña
