= 2026 Mexico cartel unrest =

Reaction to the killing of El Mencho

- Part of the aftermath of the 2026 Jalisco operation and the Mexican drug war
Date	22–23 February 2026 (1 day)
Location	Mexico
Result	Mexican government victory

Belligerents
Mexico	Jalisco New Generation Cartel

Commanders and leaders
Claudia Sheinbaum; (Mexico) Ricardo Trevilla Trejo; (Mexico) Omar García Harfuch	Hugo César Macías Ureña "El Tuli" †; Heraclio Guerrero Martínez "Tío Lako"

Units involved
(Mexico) Secretariat of National Defense; Mexican Army; Brigada de Fusileros Paracaidistas; National Guard	Jalisco New Generation Cartel

Casualties and losses
25 National Guard members killed 1 Jalisco state prosecutor agent killed 1 jail guard killed; 3 soldiers injured	~32 killed, several arrested
- 2 civilians killed

The 2026 Mexico cartel unrest was a wave of violence, blockades, arson and clashes across multiple Mexican states on 22 and 23 February 2026, following the killing of Nemesio "El Mencho" Oseguera Cervantes, leader of the Jalisco New Generation Cartel (CJNG), during a military operation in Tapalpa, Jalisco. Cartel members and affiliated groups set up roadblocks using hijacked and burning vehicles, attacked businesses, gas stations and security installations, and stormed a prison in Puerto Vallarta from which 23 inmates escaped. The federal security cabinet recorded 252 roadblocks across 20 states.

Twenty-five members of the National Guard were killed, along with an agent of the Jalisco state prosecutor's office, a custodial officer and two civilians; around 30 suspected cartel members also died. Hugo César Macías Ureña, alias "El Tuli", identified by authorities as Oseguera's right-hand man in Jalisco and as the coordinator of the retaliation, was killed by security forces at El Grullo later the same day. Classes were suspended across several states, public transport in the Guadalajara metropolitan area was halted, and Puerto Vallarta International Airport cancelled all international flights. Business groups estimated commercial losses of between 1.5 and 2 billion pesos.

== Background ==
Nemesio Oseguera Cervantes, also known as "El Mencho" has been the head of CJNG since its formation. He was the most wanted person in Mexico and was one of the most wanted criminals in the United States at the time of his death. The U.S. and Mexican governments were offering rewards of up to US$15 million and MXN$300 million, respectively, for information leading to his arrest. On 22 February 2026, Oseguera was seriously wounded during a Mexican military operation and died while being transported to Mexico City.

== Timeline ==
=== 22 February ===
An alleged cartel gunman lighting a fire at a gas station

Within hours of the operation in Tapalpa, members of the Jalisco New Generation Cartel (CJNG) began obstructing roads with hijacked cargo trucks, buses and private vehicles, many of them set on fire. The federal security cabinet ultimately recorded 252 roadblocks in Jalisco and 19 other states, among them Michoacán, Guanajuato, Colima, Tamaulipas, Aguascalientes, Zacatecas, Sinaloa, Baja California, the State of Mexico, Guerrero, Oaxaca and Veracruz. Jalisco accounted for 65 of the closures.

Arson attacks accompanied the blockades. Vehicles, businesses and gas stations were set alight in Puerto Vallarta, and more than 70 attacks were reported across 23 municipalities of Guanajuato, including 60 cases of arson. Fifty Banco del Bienestar branches were damaged, and FEMSA reported that more than 200 Oxxo convenience stores had been affected.

Security forces were attacked directly. At about 2:45 p.m., a car bomb detonated in San Juan de los Lagos, Jalisco, killing Captain Leonel Cardoso Gómez, coordinator of the National Guard's Highway and Facilities Security Battalion based in Aguascalientes, and injuring several officers as they approached a suspicious vehicle. A separate vehicle-borne improvised explosive device detonated near a National Guard installation, damaging the structure and injuring personnel; Milenio reported that federal authorities attributed the attack to Hugo Gonzalo Mendoza Gaytán, alias "El Sapo".

An armed group attacked the state prison at Ixtapa, Puerto Vallarta, ramming a vehicle through the main gate and opening fire, which set off a riot inside. Twenty-three inmates escaped and a custodial officer was killed.

The Governor of Jalisco, Pablo Lemus Navarro, declared a Code Red alert for the state.

Later that day, security forces located Hugo César Macías Ureña, alias "El Tuli", at El Grullo, Jalisco. Authorities had identified him as Oseguera's right-hand man in the state and as the figure coordinating the retaliation, and said he had offered up to MX$20,000 for each soldier killed. An aeromobile unit of the Brigada de Fusileros Paracaidistas attempted to apprehend him. He tried to flee by vehicle and opened fire on the troops, who returned fire and killed him.

=== 23 February ===
Federal authorities reported that roughly 90 per cent of the previous day's roadblocks had been cleared, although isolated blockades and vehicle burnings continued in parts of Jalisco, including the municipalities of Autlán and Cihuatlán, and some federal and state highways remained intermittently obstructed by debris and abandoned vehicles.

== Impact ==
=== Transportation disruptions ===
Bus and urban rail services in the Guadalajara metropolitan area were temporarily suspended following the outbreak of coordinated violence. State authorities halted the public transport network, including city bus routes, the Mi Macro Periférico and the Sistema de Tren Eléctrico Urbano lines, citing security risks after vehicles were set ablaze and major roads were blocked. Long-distance services departing from the Central de Autobuses del Norte in Mexico City cancelled departures to western states, including Jalisco, Guanajuato, Michoacán, and Aguascalientes, due to highway closures.

Grupo Aeroportuario del Pacífico (GAP), operator of Puerto Vallarta International Airport, reported that all international operations and the majority of domestic flights were cancelled following the outbreak of violence, with airlines citing security concerns and uncertainty regarding access routes to the airport. Airlines cancelling flights included Southwest Airlines, Alaska Airlines, United Airlines, Delta Air Lines, Air Canada, WestJet, Porter Airlines, and Volaris. Airport authorities said that no violent incidents occurred inside the terminal itself and that the facilities remained under the protection of federal security forces. GAP also reported that Guadalajara International Airport was operating normally without flight cancellations or security incidents, and passengers were advised to monitor transportation conditions and stay in close contact with their airlines, as highway blockades and violence affected access routes to the airports.

=== Casualties ===
Twenty-five members of the National Guard were killed in six separate attacks in Jalisco, among them Captain Leonel Cardoso Gómez, who was killed by a car bomb in San Juan de los Lagos. Around 30 suspected cartel members were killed in Jalisco and four in Michoacán. An agent of the Jalisco state prosecutor's office and a custodial officer were also killed.

Two civilians died. A forty-five-year-old woman (mother of two children and pregnant at the moment) was killed during the clashes, and a two-year-old boy died on 12 April 2026 of burns sustained in Valle de Chalco, State of Mexico, when the convenience store he was in was attacked during the unrest.

A cargo truck driver, Bulmaro Herrera Bandala, disappeared during the blockades; on 7 March 2026 the Veracruz state prosecutor's office requested an arrest warrant in connection with the case.

=== Economic loses ===
The Confederation of National Chambers of Commerce, Services and Tourism (Concanaco Servytur) estimated preliminary losses of between 1.5 and 2 billion pesos, covering property damage, looting, lost merchandise and revenue forgone while businesses were closed. The organisation said around 400,000 commercial establishments closed temporarily, of which roughly 90 per cent had reopened by 24 February.

=== Education and public services ===
The Jalisco Secretariat of Education suspended classes at all levels in public and private schools on 23 February as a precautionary measure. Several other states suspended or moved classes online, and the University of Guanajuato shifted its upper secondary and higher education teaching to distance learning to avoid travel between municipalities. Most states resumed classes on 24 February.

=== Effect on foreign nationals ===
The Embassy of the United States, Mexico City, sent out a security alert telling United States citizens in multiple states to shelter in place. The foreign ministries of Australia, New Zealand, France, the United Kingdom, Canada, and Indonesia issued similar alerts.

The U.S. State Department set up a 24/7 crisis hotline on 22 February to support US citizens impacted by the unrest in Mexico. The hotline received hundreds of calls after several American airlines suspended flights to Puerto Vallarta.

More than 1,000 visitors were stranded overnight at the Guadalajara Zoo.

== Arrests and prosecutions ==
In Jalisco, 41 people were detained in connection with the blockades. On 25 February, 18 of them were remanded to the Puente Grande prison on charges relating to looting and vandalism of businesses.

On 24 February, eleven police officers, ten from Jalisco and one from Ecuandureo, Michoacán, were detained on suspicion of having taken part in the blockades and vehicle burnings. Investigators alleged that the officers had used a WhatsApp group to pass operational information to the cartel, including patrol movements of state and federal forces. A judge later granted them conditional release with the proceedings suspended, subject to supervision and restrictions.

Of the 23 inmates who escaped the Puerto Vallarta prison on 22 February, four were recaptured on 26 February in the El Colorado neighbourhood of Puerto Vallarta by the Secretariat of the Navy. Security Secretary Omar García Harfuch said the search for the remaining 19 continued. The recaptured inmates were subsequently charged.

== Misinformation and disinformation ==
During the retaliatory attacks, a substantial wave of disinformation spread across social media. According to experts interviewed by Reuters and the Associated Press, the Jalisco New Generation Cartel (CJNG) and affiliated online networks were responsible for circulating disinformation that exaggerated the scale of the violence. Widely shared false claims included reports that the Guadalajara International Airport was "taken over by assassins", that "[s]moke was billowing from a church and multiple buildings in the city of Puerto Vallarta", and that tourists had been taken hostage. Other viral posts alleged that President Claudia Sheinbaum had been evacuated to a naval vessel, claimed without evidence that Oseguera was still alive or had been killed for political reasons, or asserted that United States agents had been directly involved in the operation.

A report by the Digital Media Observatory at the Monterrey Institute of Technology and Higher Education found that hundreds of false or unverified posts circulated in the two days following Oseguera's death, many amplified by bots and AI-generated content without context or verification. According to the data, 35-40% of the posts lacked context, 25% were misleading, and 25% were manipulated using artificial intelligence or entirely fabricated. Some misleading posts were also amplified by accounts in the United States and high-reach social media profiles on platforms like X.

Experts interviewed by Reuters said the messaging appeared aimed at projecting an image that the Mexican government had lost control. One analyst stated that while the operation represented a tactical success for security forces, organized crime groups and their online allies were able to shift public attention "away from the (military raid) to chaos," contributing to public confusion and fear.

== See also ==
- Battle of Culiacán – Failed attempt in 2019 to capture Ovidio Guzmán López that resulted in six civilian and Mexican military deaths
- 2023 Sinaloa unrest – Wave of violent incidents and road blockades in Sinaloa triggered by the successful arrest of Ovidio Guzmán López of the Sinaloa Cartel
