= Jessica Johanna Oseguera González =

Mexican criminal, El Mencho's daughter (born 1986)

Jessica Johanna Oseguera
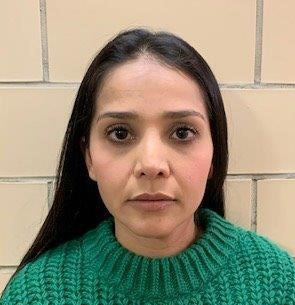
- Oseguera González in 2021
- Born: July 23, 1986 (age 40); San Francisco, California, United States
- Other name: La Negra
- Citizenship: Mexican; American
- Education: Universidad Jesuita de Guadalajara
- Organization: Jalisco New Generation Cartel
- Spouse: Julio Alberto Castillo Rodríguez
- Children: 2
- Parent(s): El Mencho; Rosalinda González Valencia
- Relatives: El Menchito (brother); Laisha Michelle Oseguera González (sister)
- Status: Convicted and released
- Criminal charge: Money laundering

Jessica Johanna Oseguera González (born 23 July 1986), also known by the alias “La Negra”, is an American and Mexican businesswoman, convicted money launderer, and financial operator of the Jalisco New Generation Cartel (CJNG). She is the daughter of former CJNG leader Nemesio Rubén Oseguera Cervantes (“El Mencho”).

== Early life and education ==
Jessica Johanna Oseguera González was born on 23 July 1986 in San Francisco, California, United States. She is the first-born child of Rosalinda González Valencia and Nemesio Oseguera Cervantes; both Rosalinda and Nemesio were former Milenio Cartel members, while her father would later become a founding member and leader of the CJNG, following the Milenio Cartel’s collapse.

Jessica Johanna has two siblings, Rubén Oseguera González ("El Menchito") and Laisha Michelle Oseguera González.

She studied at the University of Guadalajara, where she earned a bachelor's degree in marketing.

She holds dual American and Mexican citizenship.

== Criminal career ==
On 26 February 2020, U.S. authorities arrested Oseguera González at a courthouse in Washington, D.C. She had gone to attend the preliminary hearing of her brother, Rubén, who had been extradited from Mexico to the United States a few days earlier. At the time of her arrest, she resided in Guadalajara, Jalisco, Mexico.

Oseguera González was charged with five counts related to her involvement with companies linked to the CJNG. These companies had been designated by the Office of Foreign Assets Control. The companies included a tequila brand, a sushi restaurant, and a vacation rental business. As part of the sanction, the U.S. government prohibited U.S. citizens from engaging in business activities with her.

On 12 March 2021, she pleaded guilty to knowingly engaging in financial transactions with the companies, facing up to 30 years in prison. On 11 June, she was sentenced to 30 months at the Federal Correctional Institution in Dublin, California after her attorneys requested a transfer so she could be closer to her family.

Despite the sentence, the Federal Bureau of Prisons projected her release date for 13 April 2022, only 10 months from the date.

Jessica Oseguera was released on 14 March 2022, after benefiting from the First Step Act, a federal law enacted by the United States in December 2018.

== Death of El Mencho ==
Her father Nemesio Oseguera Cervantes was killed in a military operation on 22 February 2026. His hideout in Tapalpa which was raided was likely a property of Cabañas La Loma, the vacation rental complex which was managed by Oseguera González. (Note: Previously called Las Flores Cabañas when it was designated by the US.)

== See also ==
- Women in the Mexican drug war
- Mexican drug war
- List of Mexican cartels
- Ismael Zambada Sicairos
- Illegal drug trade in Mexico
