= Érick Valencia Salazar =

Mexican gangster

- Born: 11 March 1977 (age 49) or 19 November 1982 (age 44); Guadalajara, Jalisco, Mexico
- Other name: El 85
- Employer: Jalisco New Generation Cartel
- Predecessor: Ignacio Coronel Villarreal
- Successor: Nemesio Oseguera Cervantes
- Criminal charges: Drug trafficking; Organized crime involvement; Possession of military-exclusive firearms
- Criminal status: Extradited to the United States

Notes
- US$5 million bounty offered by the United States Department of State

Érick Valencia Salazar (Spanish pronunciation: [ˈerik βaˈlensja salaˈsaɾ]; born 11 March 1977 or 19 November 1982), commonly referred to by his alias El 85, is a former Mexican drug lord and high-ranking leader of the CJNG. He served as a high-ranking leader of the Jalisco New Generation Cartel (CJNG), a criminal group based in Jalisco. He was extradited to the United States in 2025. The Mexican Army suspects he was responsible for supervising the CJNG's cocaine and ephedrine delivery shipments from Colombia and China to Mexico, and for coordinating attacks against rival groups like La Resistencia and Los Zetas in the 2010s. Before leading the CJNG, Valencia reportedly held a leadership role within the Milenio Cartel, the predecessor group where the CJNG originated from. When several of his superiors were arrested and/or killed, Valencia and several others from the Milenio Cartel reportedly formed the CJNG.

On 3 March 2012, the Mexican Army arrested Valencia in Zapopan, Jalisco. The arrest triggered a series of coordinated attacks carried out by the CJNG to try to rescue Valencia. Throughout the states of Jalisco and Michoacán, the CJNG hijacked 25 vehicles and set them on fire across multiple highways. Three people were killed and sixteen suspects were arrested. On 27 December 2017, Valencia was released from prison after a judge concluded there were violations in his due process and because of insufficient evidence. Investigators suspect Valencia resumed activities in the CJNG following his release. In 2018, the U.S. government unsealed an indictment that charged Valencia for drug trafficking offenses since 2003. In 2019, he broke with CJNG and formed the Nueva Plaza Cartel. In September 2022, Valencia was rearrested by the Mexican Army and National Guard in Tapalpa, Jalisco. On 27 February 2025, Valencia was extradited to the United States. On 7 April 2026, Valencia pled guilty in a U.S. federal to one federal trafficking conspiracy charge.

== Early life and career ==
According to the Drug Enforcement Administration (DEA), Érick Valencia Salazar was born in either 11 March 1977 or 19 November 1982, in Guadalajara, Jalisco, Mexico. (Note: His first name Érick is sometimes spelled without an accent and/or without the "C". Another source described Saúl Ulloa Cuevas as another person other than El 85. In another source, Espinosa was spelled with a "Z", Espinoza.) He has several aliases, including El 85, Saúl Ulloa Cuevas, Gerardo Sánchez Espinosa, Érick Valencia Cornelio, Ochenta y Cinco, and Mono. His criminal profile says he is 5 ft 10 in (1.78 m) tall and weighs 180 lb (82 kg), has brown hair and brown-colored eyes, and has no known tattoos, marks, or scars. Mexican security forces suspected criminal who preferred to operate under a low-profile. He was described by Mexican military sources as a violent criminal.

Before his alleged involvement in organized crime, Valencia did not have a criminal record. In March 2007, Mexico's Office of the General Prosecutor (PGR) had an open investigation against him for alleged connection with Zhenli Ye Gon. Zhenli was Chinese-Mexican businessman and suspected drug operator for the Sinaloa Cartel; his Mexico City home was raided in 2007 and authorities discovered and seized US$205 million in cash. Valencia was mentioned in the investigation files of this case, but no other mentions of him exist in law enforcement databases prior to this.

Police reports indicated that Valencia was part of the Milenio Cartel, a criminal group headed by Óscar Orlando Nava Valencia (alias "El Lobo"), a former lieutenant of Ignacio "Nacho" Coronel Villarreal, then-leader of a Sinaloa Cartel faction. Investigators made a connection between Valencia and Zhenli was because Zhenli reportedly worked with him to import drug precursors from China for Nava and an associate of his known as Salvador Revuelta Ureña (alias "El Chava Lentes"). In the investigation, the Deputy Attorney General's Office for Special Investigation into Organized Crime (SIEDO), Mexico's former organized crime investigation agency, accused Valencia of murdering a man known as Martín Zambrano in Uruapan, Michoacán.

== Leadership tenure ==
The Mexican Army stated that Valencia became one of the leading members of following the arrest of several of his superiors. On 28 October 2009, Nava was arrested by the Army in Guadalajara, Jalisco. Several months later on 9 May 2010, security forces arrested Juan Carlos Nava Valencia (alias "El Tigre") and his sister Jacqueline Patricia Nava Valencia in Guadalajara. Later that year, Coronel Villarreal was killed in a clash with the Mexican Army. His death prompted an internal strife within the Milenio Cartel; on one front, Valencia, Martín Arzola Ortega (alias "El 53"), and Nemesio Oseguera Cervantes (alias "El Mencho") wanted to command the Milenio Cartel. The other front was headed by Elpidio Mojarro Ramírez (alias "El Pilo") and Víctor Manuel Torres García (alias "El Papirrín").

The Milenio Cartel split into two, with Valencia's and Ramírez's side waging war against each other. Valencia's front was known as Los Torcidos, while Ramírez's side was known as La Resistencia. To legitimize its existence, Valencia's group launched a propaganda campaign against its enemies, denouncing extortions done by rival gangs against civilians, businessmen, and government authorities. La Resistencia allied itself with Los Zetas, a rival group of the CJNG, to fight off the CJNG forces. They established their center of operations in the southern part of the state of Zacatecas to make incursions into Valencia's home base, Jalisco. Los Torcidos eventually won the war and consolidated their influence in western Mexico. The group then changed its name to the Jalisco New Generation Cartel (Spanish: Cártel de Jalisco Nueva Generación, or CJNG).

In 2012, the Mexican Army suspected that Valencia held a leadership role within the CJNG, and was responsible for coordinating efforts against the joined forces of La Resistencia and Los Zetas. Valencia was suspected of coordinating a drug trafficking corridor along the Pacific Ocean through the port in Manzanillo, Colima. Investigators believed he oversaw the delivery of cocaine and ephedrine shipments that arrived from Colombia and China through this port. Under his supervision, the Army believed that Valencia expanded the CJNG's market share in the Mexican states of Michoacán, Morelos, Guerrero, and Veracruz; in some states, the CJNG called itself Los Matazetas (English: Zetas-Killers) to campaign against Los Zetas in rival turfs. In Veracruz, the CJNG was responsible for the mass murder of 35 people in Boca del Río, reportedly under Valencia's command. After Valencia was arrested in 2012, the government claimed that Oseguera took over his role in the CJNG.

In the time following his release from prison, Valencia left the CJNG and co-founded a rival cartel called the Nueva Plaza Cartel.

== Arrest and aftermath ==
Around 1:00 p.m. on 9 March 2012, the Army carried out an operation in the Lomas Altas neighborhood in Zapopan, Jalisco, after receiving an anonymous tip about the presence of armed men in the vicinity. When the Army arrived at the scene, gunmen shot at the soldiers, who fired back at them. Multiple suspects escaped in two vehicles, while others sequestered themselves in the property. The assailants used hand grenades to attack the Army units; El 85 injured his hand while attempting to throw a grenade shortly before his arrest. He was given first-aid attention by the military personnel immediately after he was arrested. Once El 85 was in custody, a large confrontation erupted between security forces and alleged members of the CJNG. The initial shootout broke out in multiple streets across Zapopan: Piscis, Leo, Cáncer, and Paseo del Rocío. The attacks then spread throughout the Guadalajara metropolitan area.

In total, the CJNG hijacked 25 civilian vehicles, transportation buses, and freight trucks. The assailants set the vehicles on fire and erected roadblocks in 16 different locations. Eleven of the roadblocks took place within the metropolitan area, while the rest occurred in other municipalities of Jalisco and the neighboring state of Michoacán. These coordinated attacks were done to halt the Army's movement and try to rescue El 85. Investigators also suspected that these attacks created a distraction among authorities to allow other El 85 allies, like El Mencho and Joaquín "El Chapo" Guzmán, to escape Guadalajara undetected. Mexican authorities issued a warning to civilians and asked them to stay at home or at work to allow security forces to move with greater flexibility throughout the city. With the public transportation lines suspended, thousands of people throughout the Guadalajara metropolitan area were left stranded and had to walk home.

=== Reactions ===
The attacks created traffic jams and sparked chaos across the city. Multiple businesses and companies closed down for the day or cancelled work out of fear. School activities were cancelled across the metropolitan area, including the main campus and high schools affiliated with the University of Guadalajara. The U.S. Consulate in Guadalajara issued a warning to American citizens living in the metropolitan area and asked them to stay alert. At the Guadalajara International Airport, multiple flights were delayed and/or cancelled.

By 6:00 pm, the Army confirmed that peace had been restored. Governor of Jalisco Emilio González Márquez asked civilians to stay calm and not listen to rumors on social media. (Note: Prior to an official statement, rumors circulated that El 85 and Nemesio Oseguera Cervantes (alias "El Mencho") had been arrested.) He explained that the Mexican government was working at a municipal, state, and federal level to help restore order in Jalisco. They officially confirmed the attack details in a press conference that afternoon, and stated that they would be hosting a large meeting to coordinate their restoration efforts. Despite being a weekend, nightlife activity in Guadalajara was low that night.

On 14 March, the CJNG put up over a dozen banners across the Guadalajara metropolitan area with a text apologizing for the attacks. The text said that the group reacted that way because of the arrest of their "comrade" (an allusion to Valencia), and said that he was a man who did not interfere with the civilian population and worked to maintain peace in Jalisco. The message also denounced the CJNG's rival group Los Zetas and asked civilians to report any extortion activity they were aware of. The banners were put up around 6:00 p.m. in multiple neighborhoods; investigators confirmed that several coolers were left at some of the scenes where the banners were erected. They did not clarify what was inside the coolers. (Note: Coolers are often used by organized crime groups to drop off mutilated corpses at a crime scene.) The Government of Jalisco refused to give a statement on the banners put up by the CJNG because they claimed it was against policy.

== Imprisonment ==
Once the clashes were over, Valencia was transferred to the PGR's installations in Mexico City for authorities to determine his legal status. The government confirmed that three people were killed and sixteen suspects had been arrested for their alleged participation in the attacks. At the scene, authorities seized six handguns, 37 assault rifles – among them 19 AR-15s equipped with grenade launchers – two machine guns, two Barrett rifles, three hand grenades, 119 gun magazines, 69,000 cartridges, three gun silencers, communication equipment, and two vehicles. Along with Valencia, the government confirmed that they also arrested a suspected high-ranking CJNG member known as Otoniel Mendoza and/or Otoniel Rubio Silva (alias "Tony Montana"). Tony Montana reportedly worked under Valencia and as the CJNG's second-in-command. In addition, the government confirmed the arrest of José Luis Salazar Gutiérrez (alias "El Chelis"), a suspected high-ranking member of the CJNG. (Note: Investigators suspected that both Tony Montana and Salazar assisted Valencia by moving drugs through the Pacific Ocean corridor.)

The Army's spokesperson Ricardo Trevilla Trejo presented Valencia in front of the media in a press conference on 12 March. He gave a background of Valencia's suspected involvement in organized crime, starting with Coronel Villarreal and the split of the Milenio Cartel. The head of the SIEDO, Guillermina Cabrera Figueroa, stated that Valencia's charges involved organized crime involvement and illegal possession of military-exclusive firearms. She confirmed that the SIEDO requested a legal preventative arrest to a federal judge in order to allow investigators to recollect more evidences against the defense. Jalisco's former Attorney General Tomás Coronado Olmos said that following Valencia's arrest, Mexican security forces carried out raids in four houses in Zapopan. At these properties they discovered multiple weapons and at least two corpses. They also claimed to have discovered physical evidence of other deaths in the property.

On 14 March, a federal court approved the SIEDO's request to keep Valencia under preventative arrest for 40 days. Once this concluded, Valencia was first imprisoned at the Federal Social Readaptation Center No. 1 (also known as "Altiplano"), a maximum-security prison in Almoloya de Juárez, State of Mexico. He remained in this prison until 12 June 2014, when authorities confirmed his transfer to the Federal Social Readaptation Center No. 2 (also known as "Puente Grande"), a maximum-security prison in Jalisco. His transfer was carried out under strong surveillance from the Mexican Federal Police in early hours of that morning. During his five-year imprisonment, Valencia's defense issued at least six writs of amparo against his arrest and charges, which included organized crime involvement and illegal possession of military-exclusive weapons.

=== Release and investigation ===
After spending five years in prison, Valencia was released from Puente Grande on 29 December 2017, (Note: Another source stated he was released on 30 December 2017.) following Guadalajara-based federal judge Alejando Castro Peña's decision that there were violations in his due process and that there was insufficient evidence against him. The due process violation was made because the Army arrested Valencia inside a property without having a raid warrant. When testifying in court, four eye-witnesses testimonies from detainees contradicted the versions given by the Army. According to the Army's account, Valencia and his henchmen were armed and visible from outside the property. Since in flagrante delicto existed, the Army proceeded to go inside the property, where a shootout broke out and eventually resulted in Valencia's arrest. Other eye-witness accounts, however, stated that the Army arrived at the property in multiple vehicles and entered the property to apprehend Valencia without a raid warrant. They said there were not armed outside, as claimed by the Army. The court highlighted inconsistencies among the Army versions on what occurred after Valencia was detained. In addition, the court stated that investigators mishandled weapons found at the crime scene by sending them to the SIEDO offices without following the appropriate procedures.

During Valencia's trial, the PGR presented a protected witness known by his code name Wicho, who testified against Valencia. Wicho claimed that he met him in a meeting in 2004 in Gómez Palacios, Durango, and that Valencia was involved in organized crime. The court was not convinced that Wicho's accusations irrefutably proved that Valencia was guilty of the charges imposed by the PGR. In specific, Wicho's claim, according to the court, did not prove that Valencia was involved in organized crime and drug trafficking. Renato Salas Heredia, the head of Mexico's National Security Commission (CNS) (es), stated that Wicho's claim was not enough to sustain a case in Mexico's New Criminal Justice System (Spanish: Nuevo Sistema de Justicia Penal, NSJP). He stated that the government was training law enforcement on the new protocols and standards in order to prevent situations similar to Valencia's case. The court absolved Valencia from all the charges the PGR had against him. He was not re-arrested immediately after his release because he was not wanted by any other Mexican law enforcement agency and because there was no pending arrest warrant against him.

His release was not made public until mid-January 2018, when a government document containing the court's decision was leaked to the press. Since the decision was made over the holidays, Mexico's Secretariat of the Interior and other intelligence agencies were not available to appeal the court's decision as they had done in the past with suspected drug lords who were released prematurely. The release raised suspicions among the press because of the secrecy surrounding the case and because it involved a person like Valencia, who was in possession of illegal firearms at the time of his arrest. The press speculated that intimidation towards the judge may have played a role in the verdict.

On 24 January 2018, Jalisco's Attorney General Raúl Sánchez Jiménez was interviewed by journalists and avoided giving an official statement on the state government's stance on Valencia's release. "It was a federal judge who absolved him", he said. He also said he could not confirm or deny if his release would bring more violence to Jalisco. He also told journalists that the government was prepared for any violent events that may derive from Valencia's possible reinstatement in the CJNG. Investigators suspected that violence would increase in Jalisco, and that Valencia's release was a value-added for the CJNG. Security forces stated that upon his release from prison, Valencia contacted Carlos Enrique Sánchez Martínez (alias "El Cholo"), a high-ranking member of the CJNG, to start a campaign against Oseguera. They formed a cartel known as the Nueva Plaza Cartel, with Sánchez serving as the reported leader.

== Break with CJNG and formation of Nueva Plaza Cartel ==
In 2019, Valencia and Sánchez were confirmed to still be the leaders of the Nueva Plaza Cartel and they had turned against their former cartel and were even aiding the Sinaloa Cartel in fighting the CJNG. They were previously reported as co-founders of the cartel in 2018 as well. Sánchez previously murdered a CJNG financier and after Oseguera attempted to retaliate with a failed hit on Sánchez, the Nueva Cartel retaliated by successfully murdering the leader of the CJNG's hit squad. Sánchez was later murdered, with his body being discovered stabbed and wrapped in plastic on a park bench in downtown Tlaquepaque on March 18, 2021. Sánchez was later presumed to be the head of the Nuevo Plaza Cartel at the time of his death.

== Renewed criminal charges ==
On 3 May 2018, the United States District Court for the District of Columbia indicted Valencia for his alleged involvement in international drug trafficking. According to court files under federal judge James E. Boasberg, Valencia participated in the distribution of 5 kg (11 lb) or more of cocaine from Mexico and elsewhere for illegal importation into the U.S. from 2003 to 2018. If convicted, the indicted states that Valencia would have to forfeit the proceeds he made from the violation. This indictment against Valencia was unsealed on 9 August 2018.

On 16 October 2018, the United States Department of State, Justice, and Treasury announced a joint law enforcement measure against the CJNG, and stated that they were placing significant efforts to apprehend Valencia for his alleged drug trafficking activities. The also announced that they are offering up to US$5 million through the Narcotics Rewards Program to anyone that gives U.S. authorities information that leads to his arrest. The U.S. government called Valencia a "fugitive" and stated he was likely hiding somewhere in Mexico.

== 2022 arrest ==
On 4 September 2022, Valencia and two of his associates were detained by Mexican Army and National Guard forces in the Jalisco town of Tapalpa. Following his arrest, Valancia was granted an Amparo against his immediate extradition to the United States.

== Extradition to the United States ==
On 27 February 2025, Valencia along with 28 other narco figures were extradited to the United States.

== April 2026 guilty plea ==
On 7 April 2026, Valencia pled guilty in a federal court in Washington D.C. to one count of federal drug trafficking conspiracy. Under U.S. federal law, Valencia must serve at least ten years in prison for this charge, with the charge also carrying a maximum life sentence.

== See also ==
- Mexican drug war
