= Laisha Michelle Oseguera González =

Daughter of Mexican druglord (born 2001)

- Born: 4 April 2001 (age 25)
- Citizenship: American
- Parent(s): El Mencho (father); Rosalinda González Valencia (mother)
- Relatives: El Menchito (brother); Jessica Johanna Oseguera González (sister)

Laisha Michelle Oseguera González (born 4 April 2001) is a dual American and Mexican suspected criminal and member of the Jalisco New Generation Cartel (CJNG). She is the youngest daughter of drug lord Nemesio Oseguera Cervantes ("El Mencho") and Rosalinda González Valencia.

== Biography ==
Laisha Michelle Oseguera González was born on 4 April 2001. Her parents are Nemesio Oseguera Cervantes, who became one of the founders of the Jalisco New Generation Cartel before his death in February 2026, and Rosalinda González Valencia, whose family is linked to the Milenio Cartel. She has a sister, Jessica Johanna Oseguera González, and a brother, Rubén Oseguera González, who is now incarcerated. She has at least one half-brother, Juan Carlos Valencia González, one of the leaders of the Jalisco New Generation Cartel.

According to information from the Secretariat of the Navy, Laisha Michelle Oseguera's partner was Christian Fernando Gutiérrez Ochoa, whose father is reportedly José Luis Gutiérrez Valencia, who was a member of the Sinaloa Cartel and later leader of CJNG before his death in 2017. In November 2024, however, Gutiérrez-Ocha, also known as "El Gaucho" and believed to be a CJNG operation, was arrested in Riverside, California. On 20 June 2025, Gutierrez-Ochoa, also known as "El Gaucho", pled guilty in the United States to one count of international money laundering conspiracy, with the charge resulting in him facing a maximum penalty of 20 years in prison. In his guilty plea, El Gaucho admitted to being vital to CJNG's money laundering operation, especially from at least 2023 up to his arrest in 2024, using sophisticated money laundering methods involving real estate transactions, shell companies, and international money transfers in order to launder CJNG's drug trafficking proceeds. On 18 December 2025, Gutierrez-Ochoa was sentenced to serve 140 months (more than 11 years) in a U.S. federal prison.

On 15 November 2021, the Secretariat of National Defense captured her mother, Rosalinda González Valencia, in Zapopan. Shortly afterwards, two members of the Mexican Navy were kidnapped in Zapopan, which was attributed to the Jalisco New Generation Cartel, allegedly under the orders of Laisha Michelle. The two marines were later found alive.

== Personal life ==
In 2023, she was reported to be living in Riverside, California, on a property her parents bought for her. She is the owner of a small café called "El Rincón La Chulis", which may or may not serve as a front for other activities. It is located in a shopping center in Perris, California. The café serves coffee, teas, and light snacks like crepes and croissants.

She was seen at the funeral of her father, El Mencho, in Zapopan.

== See also ==
- Women in the Mexican drug war
