= 2019 Western Michoacán clashes =

Part of the Mexican drug war

- Part of the Mexican drug war
| Date | 30 August 2019 |
| Location | Tepalcatepec, Michoacán, Mexico |
| Result | Indecisive |

Belligerents
| Jalisco New Generation Cartel | El Abuelo Organization | Mexico: Mexican Armed Forces; National Guard; Michoacan State Police; Tepalcatepec Police; Armed Civilians |

Commanders and leaders
| Nemesio Oseguera Cervantes | "El Abuelo" Juan José Farias Álvarez | Unknown |

Units involved
| Unknown | Unknown | Mexican Armed Forces: Mexican Army National Guard |

Strength
| 17-50 | Unknown | Unknown |

Casualties and losses
- 9 killed 11 injured

The 2019 Western Michoacán clashes were a series of armed confrontations on 30 August 2019 between the Jalisco New Generation Cartel (CJNG) and the El Abuelo Cartel based in Tepalcatepec, Michoacán, Mexico. The clashes began early in the morning, when CJNG launched an attack on El Abuelo after declaring war on the El Abuelo Cartel and stating their intentions to expand into Michoacán and clear the state of El Abuelo. The fight lasted for several hours until government forces from the Mexican National Guard arrived and broke up the fighting.

Fighters from the CJNG cartel were reportedly armed with Barrett M82s, and as many as 50 were seen in use with the cartel mounted on trucks during the clashes. During the clashes there were a reported 9 people killed and 11 injured; the fighting lasted for 12 hours.

During the fighting, local police and armed civilians fought the cartels in several communities in surrounding areas during the clashes between CJNG and El Abuelo, until the National Guard, Army and Michoacan State Police arrived. Michoacán's prosecutor said that when the attacks started, roads were blockaded by CJNG and Cártel del Abuelo vehicles with burning trucks.
