= La Unión Tepito =

Mexican criminal organization operating in Mexico City

- Founded: 2009
- Founded by: Juan Juárez Orozco; Francisco Javier Hernández Gómez ("Pacho Cayagua"); José Alberto Maldonado López ("El Betito"); Édgar Valdez Villarreal (disputed)
- Named after: Tepito
- Founding location: Tepito, Mexico City, Mexico
- Years active: 2009−present
- Territory: Greater Mexico City, Puebla, Edomex, Veracruz, Querétaro, Tlaxcala, Morelos
- Ethnicity: Mexican
- Criminal activities: Murder, kidnapping, drug trafficking, money laundering, home invasion, arms trafficking, counterfeiting, extortion
- Allies: Los Kilos; Los Tanzanios; Los Malcriados 3AD
- Rivals: Mexico; United States; Tláhuac Cartel; Fuerza Anti-Unión; La Familia Michoacana; Jalisco New Generation Cartel; Sinaloa Cartel

La Unión Tepito is a Mexican criminal organization. It was created in 2009 under the tutelage of Édgar Valdez Villarreal. Its first leader was Francisco Javier Hernández Gómez (Pancho Cayagua), who was murdered in October 2017 in the parking lot of a shopping center in the Indios Verdes area, in the borough of Gustavo A. Madero of Mexico City. La Unión Tepito is dedicated to the sale of narcotics, kidnapping, extortion, and homicide.

== Activities ==
On September 18, 2019, a group of armed men fired at people who were at a food and snack stall in the Doctores neighborhood of the Cuauhtémoc borough. Six people died and two more were injured, including two minors. After the investigation carried out by the authorities, three people were arrested as alleged perpetrators of the incident.

In July 2020, after his arrest, "El Betito", one of the leaders of La Unión de Tepito allegedly confessed that he had laundered money for programs such as Enamorándonos and Acapulco Shore along with Óscar Flores, "El Lunares" and David García, "El Pistache," other leaders of the criminal group that maintains operations in Mexico City. This information would have been disseminated after his transfer to a maximum federal prison. . The group has the particularity of having cells made up of only by women.

On 5 November 2020, the remains of two minors who were dismembered, whose remains were abandoned in boxes moved in a "little devil", were abandoned. The victims, named Yair (12 years old) and Héctor Efraín (14 years old), were last seen outside the neighborhood where they lived, on Tuesday, 27 October. The head of government Claudia Sheinbaum confirmed that arrests had been made in the case of dismembered children in the Historic Center. The murder was later confirmed to be related to drug dealing, shocking the public given the age of the victims and the brutality of the execution. It is also known that La Unión uses minors to perpetrate criminal activities, such as the case of Dyron Alejandro, a 16-year-old minor who, after serving a sentence in a juvenile correctional facility for armed robbery was shot to death along with his partner, also a member of the cartel.

In early March 2021, the authorities transferred several members of La Unión and the Tláhuac Cartel to different federal prisons around the country, according to experts, due to the inability of the authorities to control the members of these organizations in the same prison. On 10 March 2021, Alexis Martínez alias "El Alexis", a member of La Unión Tepito and a well-known bank card cloner, was assassinated by a hitman who disguised himself as a food delivery man in Zapopan, Jalisco. The attack also left an unidentified person injured.

On 17 February 2022, the Secretary of Citizen Security of Mexico City, Omar García Harfuch, mentioned in a press release that the authorities confirmed the arrest of 64 members of La Unión Tepito, registering most of the arrests in Cuauhtémoc and Venustiano Carranza. The head of security affirmed that the criminal organization is weakened, operating as a group of cells and not as an organized cartel. Among those detained for the operations carried out by the authorities was Giovanni N alias "El Chicharo", leader of a cell of the group.

In January 2025, the organization was officially declared a terrorist organization by the United States government.

== Current leadership ==
After the arrest of "El Betito", many authorities and journalists believe that the current leader of La Unión Tepito is Eduardo Ramírez Tiburcio (or Lalo Ramírez Tiburcio), alias "El Chori", a powerful low-profile drug lord who is accused of crimes such as drug trafficking, kidnappings, homicide and feminicide, is one of the 5 most wanted criminals in Mexico City and whose reward for his capture and arrest is 5 million Mexican pesos (5 mdp).

== War against other cartels ==
Due to being the most dominant drug cartel in Mexico City, in the State of Mexico and in Hidalgo, La Union Tepito has begun to face the threat of other drug cartels seeking to take over the territories currently controlled by the "Chilango Cartel" (as La Union Tepito is popularly known).

At a regional level, their main rivals within Mexico City are the Tláhuac Cartel (who have been enemies of La Union Tepito for more than a decade) and Fuerza Anti-Unión (a notorious splinter group from La Unión Tepito who broke away from them in 2016 after the founder of Fuerza Anti-Unión, Jorge Flores Concha (aka "El Tortas") had one of his brothers murdered at the behest of "El Betito" (the leader of La Unión Tepito at the time of the crime) and the other kidnapped).

At the national level, their biggest enemies are the Jalisco New Generation Cartel (CJNG), the Sinaloa Cartel and La Familia Michoacana, three of the most powerful cartels in Mexico and which seek to take over the territories controlled by La Unión Tepito, since for years they have faced difficulties in establishing their criminal empires in the Mexican capital and in the states surrounding the capital due to the almost monopolistic dominance of the group led by El Chori (the current leader of La Union Tepito) within CDMX and its surroundings (such as the State of Mexico and Hidalgo).
