= Audias Flores Silva =

Mexican drug trafficker and terrorist (born 1980)

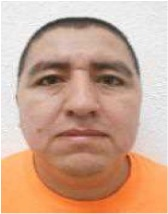
- Flores Silva's mugshot
- Born: Audias Flores Silva; 19 November 1980 (age 45); Huetamo, Michoacán, Mexico
- Other names: The Gardener; El Commander; El Bravo 2; Audi; Boss Killer
- Occupation: Drug lord
- Years active: 2000s–2026
- Status: Incarcerated

Details
- Imprisoned at: Altiplano maximum-security federal prison

Audias Flores Silva (born 19 November 1980), commonly known by his alias "El Jardinero" or "The Gardener", is a Mexican drug lord and high-ranking leader in the Jalisco New Generation Cartel (CJNG).

== Early life and career ==
Audias Flores Silva was born on 19 November 1980, in Huetamo, Michoacán, Mexico. He worked closely all his life with El Mencho, a Mexican drug lord who was once the most wanted man in Mexico and the leader of the CJNG.

After Mencho's death in February 2026, Flores Silva aimed to take over power of Mencho's organization. Analysts noted that he was possibly next in line to run the CJNG. Starting his life of crime over a decade ago, Flores Silva went by many aliases before his current one, such as “El Commander,” “El Bravo 2,” “Audi,” and “Boss Killer."

== 2026 capture ==
On April 27, 2026, Flores Silva was captured by Mexican military after being found in a ditch. Prior to his capture, the United States was offering up to $5 million in reward for any information on him. In May, 2026, his charges were expanded by a judge.

== See also ==
- List of Mexican drug cartel figures
