= Banco del Bienestar =

State-owned and -run financial institution

Banco del Bienestar, S.N.C.
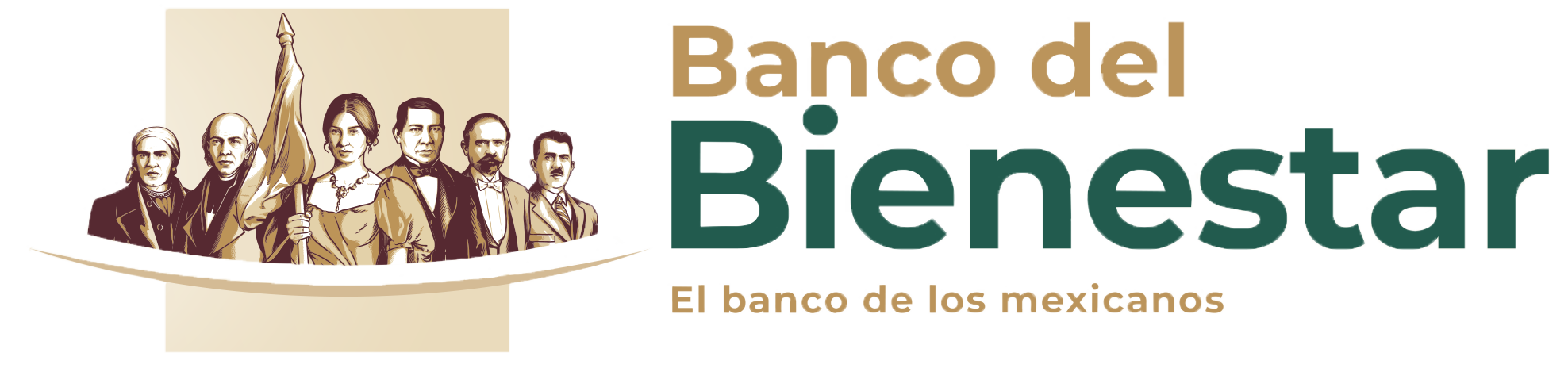
- Company type: Public bank
- Industry: Banking; Financial services
- Founded: 1946; 80 years ago in Mexico City, Mexico
- Headquarters: Mexico City, Mexico
- Area served: Mexico
- Key people: Víctor Manuel Lamoyi Bocanegra CEO
- Total assets: US$3,701 million (2020)
- Owner: Government of Mexico
- Website: www.gob.mx/bancodelbienestar

Banco del Bienestar (English: Wellbeing Bank) is a state-owned, state-run banking institution owned by the government of Mexico. It provides financial resources for social programs for the federal government. In 2018, it replaced Banco del Ahorro Nacional y Servicios Financieros (English: National Savings and Financial Services Bank, Bansefi) and prior to this, Patronato del Ahorro Nacional (English: National Savings Trust, Pahnal).

== History ==
=== Patronato del Ahorro Nacional ===
During the six-year term of President Miguel Alemán Valdés (1946–1952), the creation of small and medium-sized companies were encouraged in order to help the economy with the opening of funding from private investment. However, this was not enough to avoid an economic crisis and later the Mexican peso went down from 4.85 to the dollar to 8.65. President Alemán thought of savings as a way to strengthen and develop the country and developed the idea that the population should save and in turn use these resources to support and fund production in the country and thus reinvigorating the economy.

To achieve this, he created the Patronato del Ahorro Nacional (Pahnal), which began operating in January 1950. Its main investment instrument was bonds that were payable on demand called Bonos del Ahorro Nacional (National Savings Bond), which guaranteed to double in value after 10 years. On the first day alone, bonds for 5 million pesos were placed. With the newfound money, a factory that made lubricating oils for engines was built and houses were constructed for workers in Monterrey. Later, the Bonos del Ahorro Nacional became popular among the country as they were used to pay for all the prizes won in contests, promotions, and raffles. In 1951, the Bono del Ahorro Escolar (School Savings Bond) was created to promote the purchase of 20-cent stamps that would be pasted in a booklet for elementary school students. By collecting 10 pesos of stamps, children could exchange their booklet for a Bono del Ahorro Nacional.

In fact, in the decade of the 60s and 70s they were already consolidated as savings instruments that could mean a form of access to banking services that up to that moment were only accessible to the upper middle to high strata of the population, and as mentioned before many contests in public and private media had them as a prize, those who acquired them in some cases have mentioned that they did earn returns with them, however it is also mentioned that people lost money, in short this instrument also had ups and downs in its history, however during the 2 coming economic crises the instrument had mixed opinions.

=== Banco del Ahorro Nacional y Servicios Financieros ===
Bansefi was created on June 2, 2001, with the passing of the Organic Law of the Banco del Ahorro Nacional y Servicios Financieros and began operations on January 2, 2002. Bansefi's purpose was to promote savings and financial inclusion, to channel the federal government's support needed to strengthen and develop the popular savings and credit sector, and to become the “caja de cajas” (savings of savings). The bank's mandate was to support the institutional development of the popular savings and credit sector and to promote financial culture and savings among its members. The only savings-oriented Federal Government Development Bank that offers other financial services such as remittances and micro-insurance, among many others, which have been specially developed for its target population.

=== Financial inclusion ===
Banco del Bienestar invested in constructing 2,700 physical branches, seeking to provide access to remote areas and people with low digital literacy. The bank also offers financial services for migrants, indigenous communities, and women. In 2023, Banco del Bienestar distributed almost MX$500 billion through federal social programs. Many social aid programs are now protected as human rights under the federal constitution. Claudia Sheinbaum said her government would strengthen state-run banks including Banco del Bienestar.

== Criticism ==
The National Banking and Securities Commission sanctioned Banco del Bienestar for money laundering issues.
