= La Resistencia (gang) =

Mexican criminal enforcer squad

Cárteles Unidos
- Screenshot of a YouTube video showing Cárteles Unidos replying to the Jalisco New Generation Cartel
- Founded by: Ignacio Coronel Villarreal
- Years active: 2010−present
- Territory: Michoacán, Edomex and Guerrero
- Ethnicity: Mexican
- Leader: Juan José Farías Álvarez
- Activities: Drug trafficking, kidnapping, murder, arms trafficking, robbery, extortion
- Allies: La Familia Michoacana; Los Viagras; La Nueva Familia Michoacana; Los Blancos de Troya; Los Correa
- Rivals: Jalisco New Generation Cartel

Cárteles Unidos (English: United Cartels), originally and alternatively known as La Resistencia (English: The Resistance), is a Mexican criminal enforcer squad and U.S.-designated Foreign Terrorist Organization. The organization is composed of trained gunmen from the Sinaloa and Gulf Cartels, as well as former members of the defunct La Familia Michoacana syndicate and Knights Templar Cartel.

Cárteles Unidos was originally formed as a splinter group of the Milenio Cartel, which aligned with the Los Zetas to fight against the Jalisco New Generation Cartel (CJNG), another splinter group of the Milenio Cartel, and remove them from the states of Michoacán and Jalisco.

Shifting cartel alliances has complicated the position and role of the cartel in the Mexican Drug War; the Gulf and Sinaloa Cartels are no longer in the group, while the Knights Templar Cartel dissolved around 2017 and its remnants aligned with the CJNG, La Nueva Familia Michoacana Organization and its armed wing Los Viagras began reclaiming former members, and La Familia Michoacana reconstituted.

== History ==
=== Formation as La Resistencia from Milenio Cartel ===
Following the arrest of Milenio Cartel leader Óscar Nava Valencia on October 28, 2009, a power vacuum emerged within the cartel. Ramiro Pozos Gonzáles (“El Molca”) would accuse Nemesio Oseguera Cervantes (“El Mencho”) of tipping off Mexican authorities, leading to the arrest of Nava Valencia, while Oseguera Cervantes attempted to take over the remains of the Milenio Cartel.

Due to this perceived act of treason, members of the Milenio Cartel loyal to Oseguera Cervantes would be called “Los Torcidos” (English: “The Twisted Ones”) by members loyal to Pozos Gonzáles, who would end up calling themselves “La Resistencia” (English: “The Resistance”) . Following this rift, the Milenio Cartel would dissolve in 2010 and Oseguera Cervantes would create the Jalisco New Generation Cartel (CJNG), beginning a turf war with Pozos Gonzáles’ faction.

=== Cárteles Unidos and turf war with CJNG ===
By 2010, the CJNG would succeed the Milenio Cartel’s alliance with the Sinaloa Cartel following the death of its leader Ignacio Coronel Villarreal; Los Zetas would then begin encroaching on former Milenio territory in Michoacán, prompting the CJNG to reorganize themselves as the “matazetas” (English: “Zeta-killers”) to counter their advances. La Resistencia would briefly align with Los Zetas, in a bid to defeat the CJNG. Multiple acts of intimidation would accompany this, such as the abandonment of 26 corpses of supposed Zeta and “Milenio” members on November 25, 2011 in Guadalajara. The CJNG would manage to defeat both gangs in Michoacán and Jalisco by 2012, leading to La Resistencia and Los Zetas turning on each other.

La Resistencia would later be supported by La Familia Michoacana to fight against Los Zetas and the Beltrán-Leyva Organization (BLO), but both La Familia Michoacana and BLO were functionally defunct by 2011; La Resistencia would continue its violent campaign against Los Zetas by joining forces with the Sinaloa, Knights Templars, and Gulf Cartels, as well as former La Familia members. This new alliance would see La Resistencia be transformed into an experienced armed wing of the alliance, and the gang was subsequently renamed Cárteles Unidos as a result.

Due to the CJNG's advances in the Tierra Caliente region in 2015, Cárteles Unidos made an alliance with Los Viagras and local self-defence groups to expel the CJNG out of the region, resulting in a protracted conflict in the region since 2017.

=== Leadership changes ===
On March 1, 2011, Mexican Federal Police arrested Víctor Manuel Torres García ("El Papirrín"), a man they claimed was the leader of La Resistencia. On August 1, 2011, La Resistencia commander Neri Salgado Harrison (“El Yupo”) was arrested in Michoacán by the Mexican Federal Police; Salgado was the head of control over Apatzingan, and directed the production of methamphetamine in clandestine drug labs. On September 11, 2012, Federal Police forces arrested Pozos González, blaming him for a wave of violence in February of 2011.

== See also ==
- Merida Initiative
- Mexican drug war
