= Los Viagras =

Mexican cartel gang

- Founded: December 2014
- Founded by: Carlos Sierra Santana; Nicolás Sierra Santana
- Founding location: Buenavista Tomatlán, Michoacan
- Years active: 2014–present
- Territory: Michoacan
- Ethnicity: Mexican
- Criminal activities: Drug trafficking, money laundering, arms trafficking, extortion, murder, kidnapping
- Allies: La Nueva Familia Michoacana; Los Blancos de Troya; Guardia Michoacana; Cártel Independiente de Acapulco (defunct); Beltrán-Leyva Cartel (defunct)
- Rivals: Jalisco New Generation Cartel; La Barredora; Knights Templar Cartel

Los Viagras (Spanish pronunciation: [los ˈβjaɣɾas]) also known as Los Sierra is an armed wing of the LNFM Cartel in the state of Michoacán, Mexico. It was founded by the Sierra Santana Brothers, being led by Nicolás Sierra Santana (Alias "El Gordo") for whom arrest warrants have been issued for conspiracy to traffic drugs. The group mainly operates in the cities and municipalities of Zamora, Jacona, Tangancícuaro, Sahuayo, and Uruapan.

== Origins and activities ==
The name of "Los Viagras" originated as a joke among the four brothers, due to the excessive use of hair gel by one of the younger brothers with a spiky hairstyle, leading to his hair being rigid.

The gang began operating as a self-defense force (grupos de autodefensa comunitaria) in 2014. Former Michoacán security commissioner Alfredo Castillo Cervantes then asked them to assist in the efforts to capture the leader of the Los Caballeros Templarios cartel, Servando Gómez Martínez ("El Tuta"), who was then arrested in Morelia in February 2015.

In December 2014, during the first attempt to disarm and dissolve the grupos de autodefensa, members of "Los Viagras" took over the municipal presidency building in Apatzingán. A month later, they were violently evicted by the Federal Police on 6 January 2015, with a balance of 10 civilians dead and 21 wounded.

Los Viagras expanded into the drug trade, first by becoming involved in the production and transportation of methamphetamine, which brought them into a turf dispute with the Jalisco New Generation Cartel, particular the Tierra Caliente region of Michoacán.

One of the group's contract killers was arrested and charged in February 2019 for allegedly committing dozens of murders.

In February 2020, nine people, including three children, were killed by Jalisco New Generation gunmen in an arcade during a turf dispute.

As of June 2020, the Jalisco New Generation Cartel has been unsuccessful in taking territory held by Los Viagras in Tierra Caliente, covering parts of the states of Michoacán, Guerrero and the State of Mexico. Los Viagras and New Generation have been in conflict for control this region since 2017. Despite numerous New Generation attacks, Los Viagras and the Cartel del Abuelo were reported as having a "profound advantage" over New Generation in Tierra Caliente.

As of July 2026, Los Viagras were designated as a Foreign Terrorist Organization by the United States Department of State, joining other designated Cartels like the Sinaloa Cartel and the Jalisco New Generation Cartel. The designation allows the United States government other take further action against the groups.
