= Jalisco New Generation Cartel =

Mexican drug cartel

Jalisco Cartel
- Cártel de Jalisco Nueva Generación
- Artist's rendering of the logo of the CJNG
- Founded: August 31, 2009; 17 years ago
- Founder: Nemesio Oseguera Cervantes (El Mencho) † Emilio Alejandro Pulido Saldaña, Martin Arzola Ortega † , and Érick Valencia Salazar
- Named after: Foundation in Guadalajara, Jalisco, and being the successor to the Milenio Cartel
- Founding location: Guadalajara, Jalisco, Mexico
- Years active: 2009–present
- Territory: Mexico: Jalisco, Nayarit, Aguascalientes, Baja California, Baja California Sur, Veracruz, Tamaulipas, Chiapas, Tlaxcala, Querétaro, Michoacan.
- Membership: 18,800–33,100+
- Leaders: Juan Carlos Valencia González; Julio Alberto Castillo Rodríguez; Ricardo Ruiz Velasco; Gonzalo Mendoza Gaytán
- Criminal activities: Drug trafficking, arms trafficking, human trafficking, torture, fuel theft, cybercrime, smuggling, money laundering, etc.
- Allies: Juárez Cartel; La Línea (gang); Caborca Cartel; Gulf Cartel; Primeiro Comando da Capital; MS-13; Clan del Golfo; Popular Liberation Army; FARC-EP 'Ndrangheta; Guerreros Unidos; Camorra; Nuestra Familia; Los Chapitos
- Rivals: Sinaloa Cartel; Tijuana Cartel; Santa Rosa de Lima Cartel; Los Viagras; Cárteles Unidos; Autodefensas; Nueva Plaza Cartel; Knights Templar Cartel (defunct); La Familia Michoacana; Cártel del Noreste; La Unión Tepito; Los Zetas; Zetas Vieja Escuela; Barrio Azteca (current status unknown); Los Correa; Cartel del Abuelo; Grupo Sombra; Gente Nueva; La Nueva Familia Michoacana; La Mayiza

The Jalisco New Generation Cartel (Spanish: Cártel Jalisco Nueva Generación, pronounced [ˈkaɾtel xaˈlisko ˈnweβa xeneɾaˈsjon]), also known as CJNG, is a Mexican criminal syndicate based in Jalisco founded and headed by Nemesio Oseguera Cervantes, commonly known as El Mencho, until he was killed by the Mexican Army in 2026. The cartel has been characterized by extreme violence and public relations campaigns. Though the CJNG is known for diversifying into various criminal rackets, drug trafficking (primarily cocaine and methamphetamine) remains its most profitable activity. The cartel has been noted for cannibalizing victims during the training of newly inducted sicarios or members, as well as using drones and rocket-propelled grenades to attack rival groups.

CJNG started in 2009 as a splinter group of the Milenio Cartel, the other being La Resistencia. CJNG defeated La Resistencia and took control of Milenio's smuggling networks. CJNG expanded its operation network from coast to coast in six months, making it one of the criminal groups with the greatest operating capacity by 2012. Following the emergence of the cartel, homicides, kidnappings and discoveries of mass graves spiked in Jalisco. By 2018, the CJNG was believed to have over 100 methamphetamine labs throughout Mexico. Based on average street value, its trade could net upwards of $8 billion for cocaine and $4.6 billion for crystal meth each year. The CJNG are fighting the Nueva Plaza Cartel for control of Guadalajara; La Unión Tepito for Mexico City; Los Viagras and La Familia Michoacana for the states of Michoacán and Guerrero; Los Zetas in the states of Veracruz and Puebla; Cártel del Noreste in Zacatecas; the Sinaloa Cartel in Baja California, Sonora, Ciudad Juárez, Zacatecas and Chiapas; as well as the Santa Rosa de Lima Cartel in Guanajuato. They have an alliance with the Cártel del Golfo in Zacatecas and La Línea in Juárez.

CJNG is considered by the Mexican government to be one of the most dangerous criminal organizations in Mexico and the most powerful drug cartel in Mexico. It is also considered the cartel with the most paramilitary firepower. CJNG is heavily militarized and more violent than other criminal organizations. It has a special operations group known as the Grupo Élite for specific types of warfare. Its hitman training program is strict and professional. The cartel is best known for its fights against the Zetas and Templarios, it has fought La Resistencia for control of Aguililla, Michoacán, and its surrounding territories.

In later time, it would be revealed that a major part of El Mencho's influence in the CJNG actually came through his marriage to Rosalinda González Valencia, herself highly involved in drug trafficking.

From 2018 to 2020, the CJNG engaged in 298 reported acts of gang-related violence, more than any other cartel. By 2020, US officials considered CJNG its "biggest criminal drug threat" and Mexico's former security commissioner called it "the most urgent threat to Mexico's national security". The group was designated as a terrorist organization by the United States Department of State during Trump's second term in February 2025, which separately also includes the offering a $5 million reward for information that leads to the arrest of Flores Silva.

== History ==
With the capture of Óscar Orlando Nava Valencia in October 2009 and the death of Ignacio Coronel Villarreal, of the Sinaloa Cartel in 29 July 2010, a power vacuum emerged and the Milenio Cartel (then loyal to the Sinaloa Cartel) broke into smaller factions. The most notable were the Jalisco New Generation Cartel (CJNG) headed by Nemesio Oseguera Cervantes "El Mencho" (who suspected the Sinaloa cartel had betrayed its leaders) and La Resistencia headed by Ramiro Pozos "El Molca" who switched alliances to form a brief alliance with Los Zetas (La Resistencia was founded by Sinaloa to counter Los Zetas), and started a turf war for control of the region.

Some members of the Milenio Cartel, then a Sinaloa Cartel branch, who splintered and formed the CJNG were Nemesio Oseguera Cervantes (El Mencho), Érick Valencia Salazar (El 85) and Martín Arzola Ortega (El 53). With this split, a turf war against La Resistencia, headed by Ramiro Pozos (El Molca), and Los Zetas for the control of the region started. Emilio Alejandro Pulido Saldaña, better known as "El Tiburón", was considered to be a co-founder as well.

=== First appearance ===
CJNG interrogating Zeta members

In June 2009, inside an abandoned truck in a residential neighborhood in Cancún, Quintana Roo, the Mexican authorities discovered the corpses of three men. Along with their remains was found the following message:

We are the new group Mata Zetas (Zeta Killers) and we are against kidnapping and extortion, and we will fight them in all states for a cleaner Mexico.

— Los Mata Zetas (Jalisco New Generation Cartel)

These murdered men were then linked to individuals who had been shown in a video on YouTube while being interviewed by masked men armed with assault rifles. A number of videos online confirmed the existence of the Jalisco New Generation Cartel, which was dedicated at that time to kill Gulf Cartel and Zeta members alike. In the interrogation videos done by the Mata Zetas, the captured cartel members confessed their criminal activities and gave out the names of police commanders and politicians who provided them with protection. According to Terra Networks, the government agency of the SEIDO received a phone call on 1 July 2009 from an unidentified man who said that the cartel members of Los Zetas were going to be "kidnapped and eliminated" from Cancún and Veracruz.

=== 2011–2012 Veracruz massacres ===
==== 2011 Veracruz massacres ====
In spring 2011, the CJNG declared war on all other Mexican cartels and stated its intention to take control of the city of Guadalajara. However, by midsummer, the group appeared to have been reunited with its former partners in the Sinaloa Cartel. In addition to maintaining its anti-Zetas alliance with the Gulf Cartel, the Sinaloa Cartel in 2011 affiliated itself with the Knights Templar in Michoacán. To counter Los Zetas in the state of Jalisco, the Sinaloa Cartel affiliated itself with the CJNG.

On 20 September 2011, two trucks containing 35 dead bodies were found at an underpass near a shopping mall in Boca del Río, Veracruz. All of the corpses were alleged to be members of Los Zetas, but it was later proven that only six of them had been involved in minor crime incidents, and none of them were involved with organized crime. Some of the victims had their hands tied and showed signs of having been tortured. According to El Universal, at around 17:00 an undetermined number of vehicles blocked a major avenue in Boca del Río. Once the traffic stopped, armed men abandoned two trucks in the middle of the highway. They opened the doors of the trucks and pulled out the thirty-five corpses, leaving a written message behind. Other gunmen pointed their weapons at the frightened drivers. The gunmen then fled the scene. Consequently, the stunned motorists began to grab their cellphones and post messages on Twitter warning other drivers to avoid the area. The message left behind stated the following:

No more extortions, no more killings of innocent people! Zetas in the state of Veracruz and politicians helping them: This is going to happen to you, or we can shoot you as we did to you guys before too. People of Veracruz, do not allow yourselves to be extorted; do not pay for protection; if you do is because you want to. This is the only thing these people (Los Zetas) can do. This is going to happen to all the Zeta-shits who continue to operate in Veracruz. This territory has a new proprietor.

— Cartel Jalisco Nueva Generation

The Blog del Narco reported on 21 September 2011 that the message was supposedly signed by Gente Nueva, an enforcer group that works for Joaquín Guzmán Loera, the top boss of the Sinaloa cartel. Nonetheless, on 27 September 2011, the CJNG released a video claiming they had carried out these attacks. They apologized for the massacres in Veracruz but reiterated their efforts to fight off Los Zetas, who, they claimed, "are not invincible." In the CJNG video, five men wearing balaclavas and completely black clothing are shown sitting behind a table. Then the man with the microphone states that the Matazetas are "warriors without a face, but proudly Mexicans", and that their objective is to eradicate Los Zetas. They claim in the video that they respect the Mexican Armed Forces and understand the government's stance against the drug cartels. The men in the video state that they understand and respect the government's decision of refusing to negotiate with the cartels. They also criticize the politicians who have protected Los Zetas. In addition, they claim that the Matazetas are "prohibited to extort, kidnap, steal, abuse, or do anything that will affect the national patrimony", and that they are the "armed wing of the Mexican people."

On 6 October 2011 in Boca del Río, Veracruz, 36 bodies were found by the Mexican authorities in three different houses. The Navy first discovered 20 bodies inside a house in a residential neighborhood. While searching at another house they found 11 more bodies. The third and final house contained one body. Four other bodies were confirmed separately by the state government of Veracruz. A day later, Reynaldo Escobar Pérez, the State Justice Attorney General, stepped down and resigned due to the drug-violence. And a day after his resignation, 10 more bodies were found throughout the city of Veracruz. The CJNG was also responsible for 67 killings in Veracruz on 7 October 2011.

By 9 October 2011, in only eighteen days, the state of Veracruz reported 100 killings.

==== Operation Safe Veracruz ====
In response to the multiple executions between the drug cartels, the federal government launched a military-led operation in the state of Veracruz, known in Spanish as Operativo Veracruz Seguro. In October 2011, the state of Veracruz was a disputed territory between Los Zetas and the Gulf Cartel and Sinaloa Cartel. Francisco Blake Mora, Secretary of the Interior at the time, said that the operation was implemented to serve the following goals:

1. Deploy the Armed Forces and the Federal Police throughout the Veracruz to "recover the areas controlled by the cartels."
2. Establish intelligence agencies to not only capture the cartel members, but to also dismantle their financial and operative networks;
3. Evaluate and inspect the police forces in Veracruz for any possible correlation with the cartels, "in order to count with loyal" police officers;
4. Increase the federal and state funding to improve security measures;
5. Ensure that the government is the only entity that carries out law and order.

==== Continued attacks and 2012 Veracruz massacres ====
CJNG members claiming responsibility for killing Zetas.

Despite the strong military presence, the authorities discovered seven bodies inside a Ford Lobo on 8 October 2011 in Veracruz. On 22 December 2011, three public buses were attacked by drug cartel members on Federal Highway 105 in Veracruz, leaving 16 dead. Three U.S. citizens were among those dead. Soon after the shootouts, which happened in the early morning, the authorities carried out an operation to find those responsible, killing five gunmen. The U.S. Consulate in Matamoros asked Americans to avoid traveling on highways between cities in the late hours of the night.

In Tampico Alto, Veracruz, on 23 December 2011 the Mexican authorities found 10 dead bodies after an anonymous call from a citizen. The corpses were dumped on a dirt road, and all of them were handcuffed and presented signs of torture. Nine out of the ten bodies were decapitated. Earlier in February 2011, Saturnino Valdés Llanos, the mayor of the municipality of Tampico Alto, was kidnapped in February 2011; his body was left in a garbage dump with 10 more bodies a week later. On 25 December 2011 near Tampico, Tamaulipas, a city on the border with Veracruz, 13 bodies were found inside an 18-wheeler truck. According to officials, the truck had license plates from Veracruz. Authorities indicated that this massacre was related to the other mass murders that had occurred in Veracruz. On 9 February 2012, the Mexican authorities exhumed 15 bodies from clandestine mass graves in Acayucan, Veracruz. According to government sources, by March 2012, the homicide rate in Veracruz and its surrounding territories had decreased. President Felipe Calderón attributed the low homicide rates to the Operation Veracruz, the military-led open implemented in October 2011.

On 3 May 2012 in Boca del Río, Veracruz, three photojournalists who covered the crime events in Veracruz were slain and dumped in several plastic bags in a canal. Press freedom groups indicated that the three journalists had "temporarily fled Veracruz after receiving threats [in 2011]." Over eighteen months, seven journalists had been killed in Veracruz alone. There are only a few journalists reporting on crime-related stories in the state. Upon the arrest of several members of the cartel, the authorities confirmed in August 2012 that the CJNG was responsible for killing five journalists in Veracruz.

=== 2011 Sinaloa massacre ===
On 23 November 2011, a total of 26 bodies—16 of them burned to death—were located in several abandoned vehicles in Sinaloa. The incident began at early hours of the morning in Culiacán, Sinaloa with the discovery of a vehicle on fire. When the police forces managed to put down the flames, they found inside the vehicle a dozen bodies burned to death, and with wood remains on top of them. All of the victims were handcuffed. Later, at 07:00, anonymous calls from civilians notified the police that another vehicle in the northern city limits of Culiacán was on fire. The vehicle on fire was a Ford Ranger, and inside were four bodies with bulletproof vests and handcuffed. During the night, 10 more bodies were found throughout several municipalities.

The killings were allegedly carried out by Los Zetas as a response to the massacres done by the Matazetas (CJNG) in Veracruz. Stratfor believes that this major move by Los Zetas into the territory of the Sinaloa Cartel demonstrates the Zeta's ability to attack the "heart of those cartels' territories."

=== 2011–2012 Jalisco massacres ===
==== 2011 Guadalajara massacre ====
CJNG members direct a video to Felipe Calderón.

On 24 November 2011, three trucks containing 26 bodies were found in an avenue at Guadalajara, Jalisco. All of them were male corpses. At around 7:00 pm, the Guadalajara police received numerous anonymous calls from civilians reporting that "several vehicles with more than 10 bodies had been abandoned" in a major avenue. Upon the arrival of the police forces, they found a green Dodge Caravan in the middle lane of the highway, along with a Nissan Caravan just 66 feet (20 meters) away; on the farthest right lane was a white van. Reports state that Los Zetas and the Milenio Cartel are responsible for the massacre of these twenty-six alleged Sinaloa Cartel members. In addition, in November 2011, three men from the Milenio Cartel were arrested and linked to the massacre of the twenty-six people. The authorities concluded that only six of the twenty-six that were killed had criminal records, and another ten of those dead were reported as disappeared by their family members. Among those killed were small-business entrepreneurs; a cook; a mechanic; a dentist; a truck driver; and a house painter, among others.

According to the testimonies of several family members, a group of heavily armed men abducted several people by force. One of the witnesses said that some teenagers were "drinking soda in front of a store when armed men" in two trucks abducted them. The family of one of the kidnapped victims claimed that their loved one was "a teenager without vices or problems", and that the versions of him being part of a cartel are unjust and false. Other families claimed that their loved ones did not have any problems with anybody and were honest workers. Nevertheless, when the cartel members arrested were interrogated by the authorities, they claimed that those killed in the massacre were not innocent, and formed part of Los Torcidos (another name for the Jalisco New Generation Cartel). When asked if they had tortured them, the cartel members replied that they did not. One of the killers confessed that he had plans of leaving the criminal organization but was threatened with death by his own organization if he decided to do so.

Authorities concluded that this massacre was almost a "replica" of what happened two months earlier in Veracruz, and investigators mentioned that this massacre is a response to the killings done by the Matazetas against Los Zetas in the state of Veracruz.

==== 2012 Jalisco massacres ====
The dismembered remains of 18 bodies were found inside a Toyota Sienna and Ford EcoSport near the U.S. retiree communities in Chapala, Jalisco, just south of the city of Guadalajara. Eighteen heads were found along the dismembered bodies; some had been frozen, others were covered in lime, and the rest were found in an advanced state of decomposition. An anonymous call alerted the police to the abandoned vehicles, which were found by the side of a highway early in the morning on 9 May 2012. They were consequently towed to government offices to unload the bodies. The authorities confirmed that a message was left behind by the killers, presumably from Los Zetas and the Milenio Cartel. The attorney general of the state of Jalisco, Tomás Coronado Olmos, stated that this massacre was a revenge attack for the 23 killed in the 2012 Nuevo Laredo massacres. In addition, 25 people were rescued after being kidnapped in Tala, Jalisco on 8 May 2012; the killers had plans to kill and "throw" them for public display. Another 10 people managed to escape their capture by members of Los Zetas that same day, and alerted the local media of the situation. Upon the arrest of the four alleged killers, one of the cartel members confessed that they had plans to "repeat" what had happened in the 2011 Guadalajara massacre, where 26 bodies were dumped in a major avenue for public display.

According to Proceso magazine, Los Zetas were planning to kill 50 people on 9 May 2012, a day before Mother's Day.

=== Fight against Knights Templar ===
CJNG declares war on the Knights Templar Cartel.

On 21 March 2012, the Matazetas uploaded a video on the Blog del Narco. The recording, which is slightly over four minutes, shows several men dressed in black, with ski-masks and heavily armed; some of them (apparently the leaders) were sitting down at a table—as has been observed in other videos of the CJNG. In the communiqué, the men said that they will "clean up the states of Guerrero and Michoacán", and informed the federal government, the Armed Forces and the Federal Police that the CJNG has no problems with them. Then they went on to say that the CJNG was going to start a turf war "against the Knights Templar Cartel, who were reportedly "abusing innocent people" and operating through "kidnappings, extortion, protection racketeering, property theft, and rape." Vigilante groups consisting of local townspeople, known as autodefensas, had been taking arms against the Knights Templar for several years. Now, CJNG and local autodefensas are forming unprecedented alliances between the cartel and civilians in order to disrupt a common enemy. CJNG's significant funding allows them to supply the autodefensas with military-grade arms, changing the tide of the conflict between the Knights Templar and civilians. Consequently, both the autodefensas and CJNG are mutually benefitting as CJNG offers greater protection to victims of the Knights Templar while receiving support from the community in combatting a regional rival.

==== 2012 Michoacán massacres ====
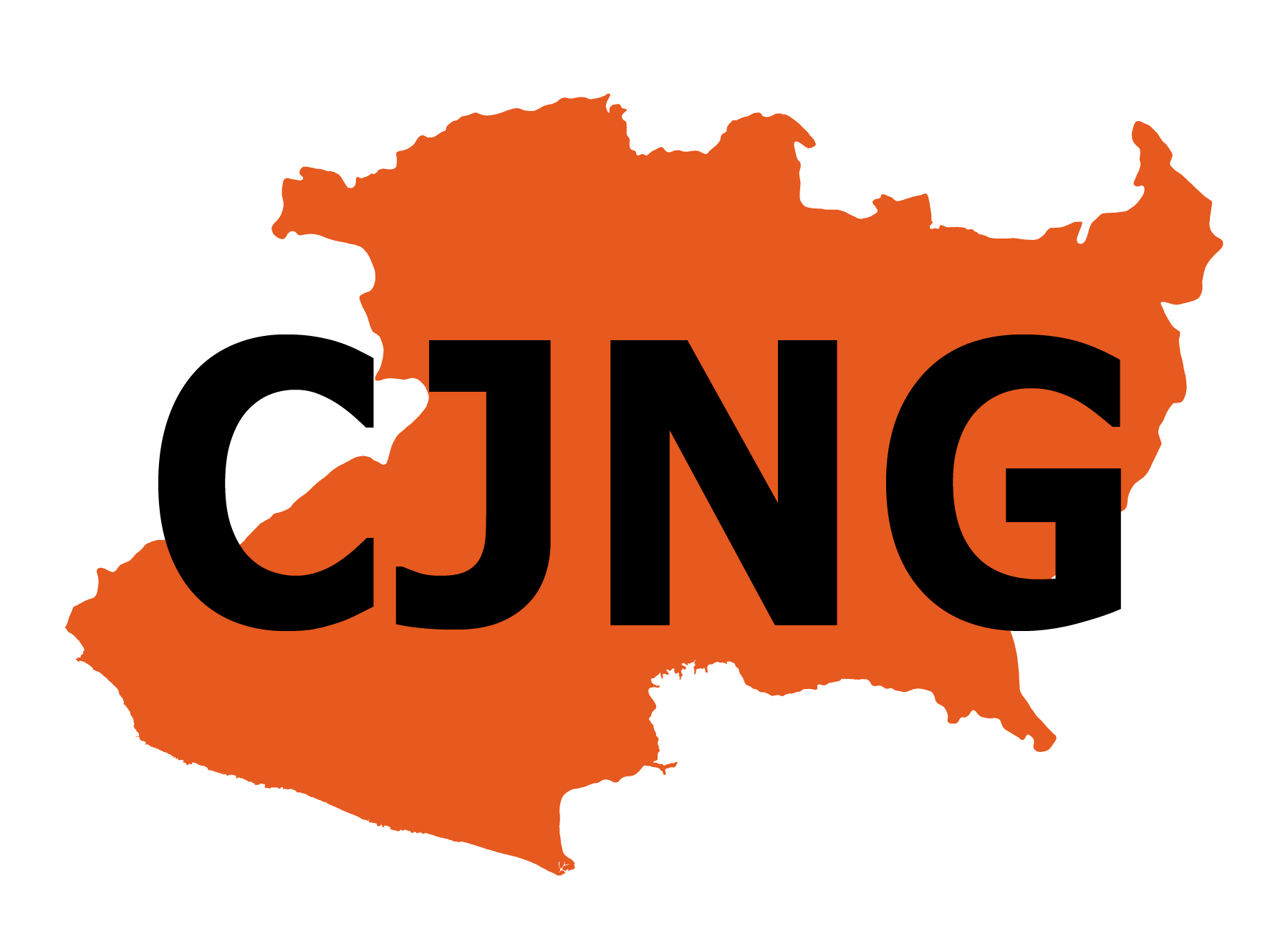
CJNG maintains an active presence in Michoacán

Following the message of the Matazetas to eradicate the Knights Templar Cartel in the state of Michoacán, 21 bodies were found throughout several municipalities of the state as of 12 April 2012. At the location of the executions, authorities discovered cardboard signs written by CJNG.

=== 2012 Nuevo Laredo massacres ===
==== 17 April 2012 massacre ====
Dismembered remains of 14 men were found in several plastic bags inside a Chrysler Voyager in the border city of Nuevo Laredo, Tamaulipas, on 17 April 2012. All of those killed were between the ages of 30 and 35. Officials stated that they found a "message signed by a criminal group", but they did not release the content of the note, nor if those killed were members of Los Zetas or of the Gulf Cartel. CNN en Español stated that the message left behind by the criminal group said that they were going to "clean up Nuevo Laredo" by killing Zeta members. The Monitor newspaper, however, said that a source outside of law enforcement but with direct knowledge of the attacks stated the 14 bodies belonged to members of Los Zetas who had been killed by the CJNG, now a branch of the Sinaloa Cartel. Following the attacks, the Sinaloa cartel's kingpin, Joaquín Guzmán Loera—better known as El Chapo Guzmán—sent a message to Los Zetas that they will fight for the control of the Nuevo Laredo plaza. The message read the following:

We have begun to clear Nuevo Laredo of Zetas because we want a free city and so you can live in peace. We are narcotics traffickers and we don't mess with honest working or business people. I'm going to teach these scums to work Sinaloa style—without kidnapping, without payoffs, without extortion. As for you, 40, I tell you that you don't scare me. I know you sent H to toss heads here in my turf, because you don't have the stones nor the people to do it yourself. Don't forget that I'm your true father.

— Joaquín Guzmán Loera (El Chapo)

Nuevo Laredo is considered a stronghold of Los Zetas, although there were incursions by the Sinaloa Cartel in March 2012. Consequently, Los Zetas responded two days later with incursions to Sinaloa, the home state of the Sinaloa Cartel. The Sinaloa Cartel's first attempt to take over Nuevo Laredo happened in 2005, when Los Zetas was working as the armed wing of the Gulf Cartel.

===== Kidnapping of Jesús Alfredo Guzmán Salazar and Iván Archivaldo Guzmán =====
In August 2016 in an upmarket restaurant called La Leche in the resort city of Puerto Vallarta, the CJNG kidnapped two sons of Joaquin Guzmán Loera (El Chapo), Jesús Alfredo Guzmán Salazar and Iván Archivaldo Guzmán Salazar, along with friends and then released them after negotiations. The event happened shortly after the incarceration of Joaquín Guzmán and was seen as a humiliation for the powerful Sinaloa cartel.

===== InSight Crime analysis =====
The "40" in the message is a reference to Miguel Treviño Morales, a top leader of Los Zetas based in Nuevo Laredo, and longtime adversary of Joaquín Guzmán. The "H" is presumably Héctor Beltrán Leyva, the last remaining brother of the Beltrán Leyva Cartel. The Beltrán Leyva organization, unlike the Zetas, has presence in Sinaloa state, and would probably have an easier time attacking the Sinaloa Cartel on its own turf. The message does not mention the fact that the Gulf Cartel is probably supporting the Sinaloa Cartel in carrying out the executions. In addition, the banner suggests that the alliance between Los Zetas and the Beltrán Leyva Cartel remains intact as of 2012 despite the losses it lived in 2008. The message also suggests the differences in the modus operandi of Los Zetas and the Sinaloa Cartel, because as authors of InSight Crime allege, the Zetas have a reputation of operating through extortion, kidnappings, robberies, and other illicit activities; in contrast, the Sinaloa Cartel is known simply for drug trafficking. (Both assertions are not wholly true, but often reflect a popular sentiment.) Guzmán attempted to take over Nuevo Laredo after the capture of the Gulf Cartel leader, Osiel Cárdenas Guillén, in 2003.

Nevertheless, Guzmán retreated after a few years of bloody turf wars. The Sinaloa Cartel's return to Nuevo Laredo, however, was seen again in March 2012 after Guzmán reportedly left several corpses and a message heralding his return. According to the Bureau of Transportation Statistics, Nuevo Laredo is the busiest border crossing in terms of truck crossings with over 1.7 million trucks a year, more than double than any other crossing on the Mexico–United States border. Nuevo Laredo is the fourth-busiest border crossing in terms of passenger vehicles. Patrick Corcoran of InSight Crime believes that the turf war in Nuevo Laredo will bring a huge wave of violence, but also mentioned that the circumstances have changed since the split of the Gulf Cartel and Los Zetas in early 2010. The current alliance between Guzmán's Sinaloa Cartel and the Gulf Cartel may successfully extract Los Zetas and give Guzmán the upper hand.

Once the Sinaloa Cartel gets established in Nuevo Laredo, it may possibly make moves to control Reynosa and Matamoros, Tamaulipas.

In 2018, InSight also stated that infighting had developed with CJNG by March 2017 which resulted in the killing of a cartel financier and the leader of the CJNG's hit squad.

=== 2015 attack on security forces ===
On 7 April 2015, the CJNG ambushed and killed 15 Mexican police officers and seriously injured five others. The cartel carried out the attack as the police officers were driving along a mountain road in Jalisco, which was blocked by the CJNG with burning vehicles. Once the convoy of police officers was stopped in a vulnerable position, gunmen from the CJNG opened fire on them with sophisticated weaponry including machine guns and grenade launchers.

=== 2018 American consulate bombing ===
On 2 December 2018, at approximately 7:30 CST, two grenades were thrown onto consular grounds in Guadalajara, with one of them exploding and causing a 16-inch (approximately 40 cm) hole in the wall of the building. At the time of the bombing, the consulate general office was closed and no injuries were sustained. It is unconfirmed if the attack was carried out by a cartel.

=== Infighting and break-up ===
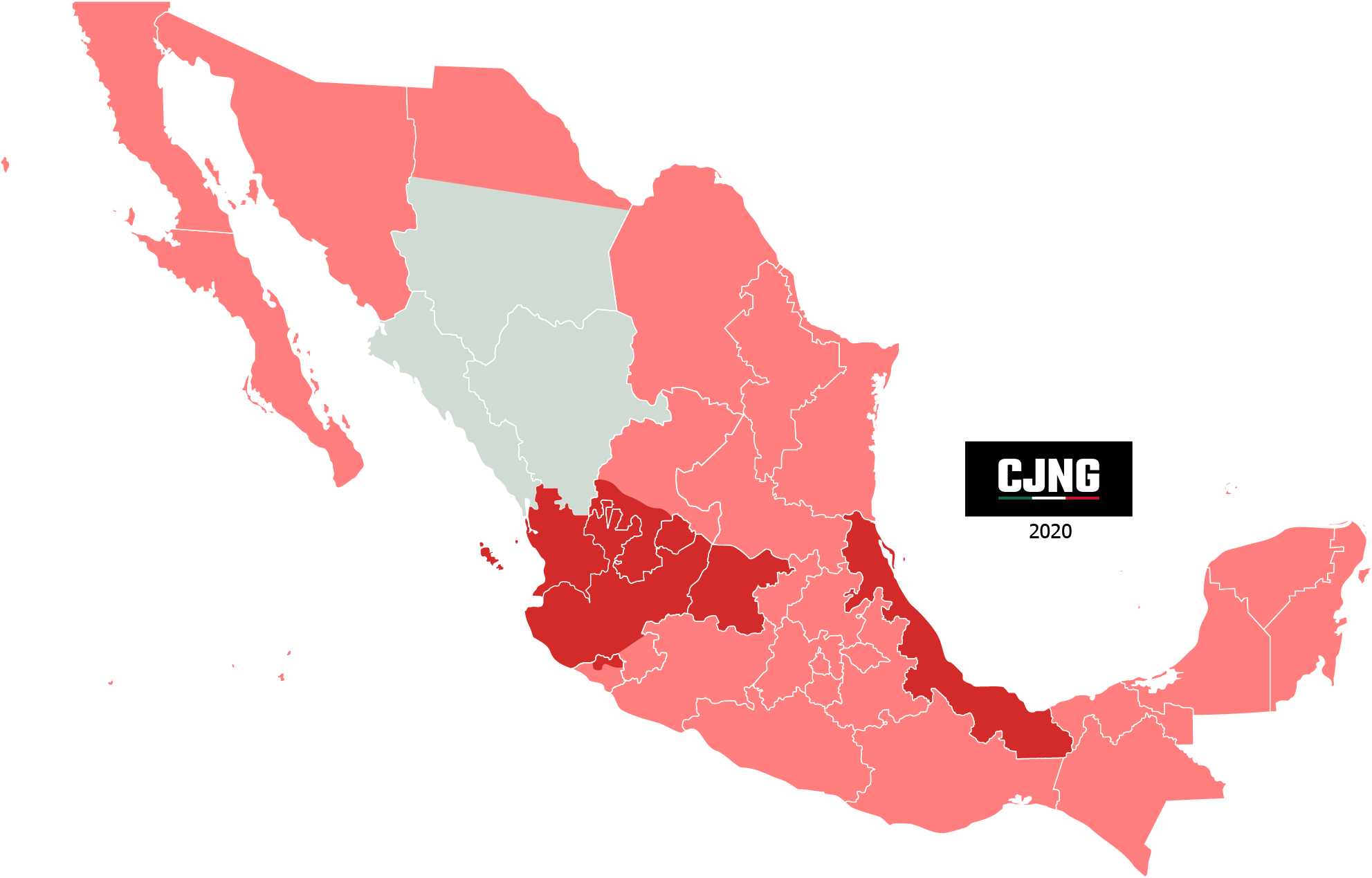
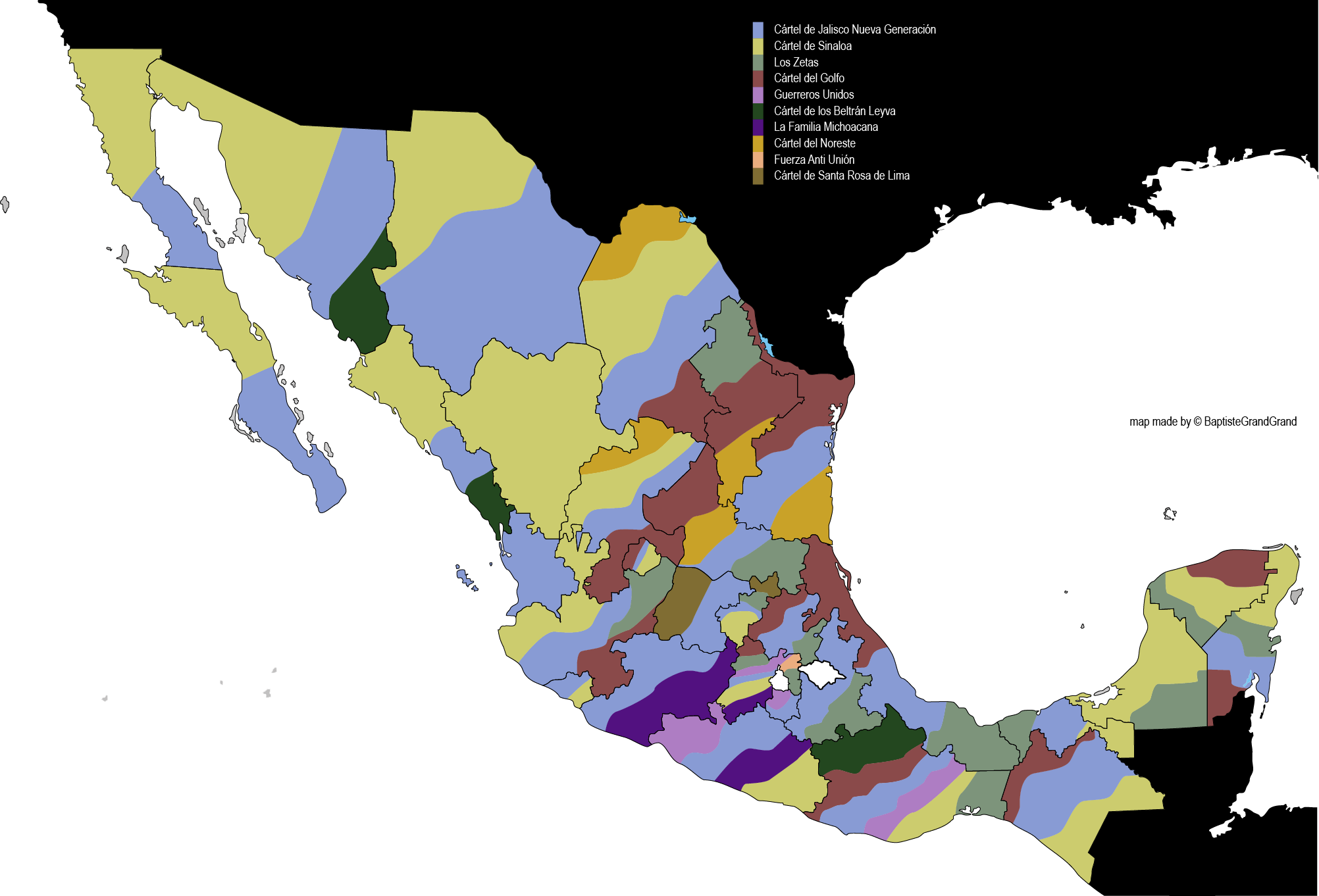
Top:
Main areas of activity
Secondary zones of activity or influence

Bottom:
Areas of activity according to the Secretariat of Finance and Public Credit

In March 2017, infighting within the CJNG showed when Oseguera ordered the murder of high-ranking CJNG member Carlos Enrique Sánchez, alias "El Cholo". The plot to murder Sánchez, who was targeted by Oseguera after murdering a CJNG financial operator nicknamed "El Colombiano", failed. Sánchez and CJNG co-founder Érick Valencia Salazar, alias "El 85", departed from the CJNG and formed a new cartel called Nueva Plaza Cartel. Upon its formation, Sánchez was made leader of the newly formed cartel. According to InSight Crime, the Nueva Plaza Cartel retaliated against the failed murder of Sánchez by murdering the person in charge of the CJNG's hit squad, nicknamed "El Kartón" or "El Marro", in August 2017. CJNG co-founder Emilio Alejandro Pulido Salazar, alias "El Tiburón", would defect to the Nueva Plaza Cartel as well.

Valencia and Sánchez also began a war with their former cartel as well. In 2019, Valencia and Sánchez were still reported to leaders of the breakaway Nueva Plaza Cartel. They also were still waging war against the CJNG and had even formed an alliance with the Sinaloa Cartel.

By 2019, Jorge Luis Mendoza Cárdenas, alias "La Garra", was listed by the U.S. Drug Enforcement Administration (DEA) as being in charge of the CJNG's trafficking operations to the United States and serves as the CJNG's liaison as well. In January 2020, senior CJNG hitwoman María Guadalupe López Esquivel, alias "La Catrina" died following a shootout with police. López, also known as "Dame of Death", was suspected of being the CJNG leader in Mexico's Tierra Caliente region. In March 2020, it was announced that a secret six-month DEA operation known as "Operation Python" resulted in the arrest of 600 CJNG operatives and the seizure of $20 million in cash. The number of arrests was revised to 750, though it was still thought the CJNG could still partake in trafficking within the U.S. so long as it keeps its base of operations in Mexico.

On 2 June 2020, Mexico's Financial Intelligence Unit released a statement revealing that as a result of joint operation with the DEA, the agency was able to locate "a large number of members of said criminal group, as well as its largest financial operators and companies used in money laundering". Mexico's Financial Intelligence Unit, a part of the finance ministry tasked with combating and preventing money laundering, then managed to have 1,770 bank accounts of CJNG-linked individuals frozen. Bank accounts to 16 CJNG-linked companies and two trusts linked to the CJNG were frozen as well. The move came after armed assailants stormed a live CJNG-provided concert on 29 May 2020 in the Veracruz city of Tierra Blanca, injuring two and killing six. Those killed included the regional CJNG leader, and also owner of the local El Sol de Tierra Blanca newspaper, Francisco Navarette Serna and the full lineup of La Calle, the band Serna was performing with. On 3 June, it was reported the amount of CJNG-linked assets which were frozen totaled $1.1 billion.

On 11 June 2020, Insight Crime journalist Victoria Dittmar dismissed media hype that the CJNG was Mexico's "dominant cartel" and stated that the CJNG was now in fact losing influence and popularity to smaller cartels. Despite unleashing numerous CJNG attacks, Los Viagras and the Cartel del Abuelo were reported as having a "profound advantage" over the CJNG in Tierra Caliente. Despite alliances with the weakened Tijuana Cartel, the CJNG failed to weaken the Sinaloa Cartel's control over criminal activities in Tijuana. Despite numerous efforts, CJNG has also been unable to establish a major presence in the Mexican states of Morelos, State of Mexico and Mexico City. However, CJNG still had strongholds in the Mexican states of Jalisco, Guanajuato, Querétaro, Hidalgo and Veracruz.

The CJNG also made its presence in Ciudad Juárez with its New Juárez Cartel, though it failed to deter the hold which La Linea and the Sinaloa Cartel's Los Salazar affiliate had over the Ciudad Juárez drug trafficking market as well. On 23 June 2020, it was revealed that the CJNG had sent assassins to kill Santa Rosa de Lima leader José Antonio Yépez Ortiz, also known as El Marro, on many occasions, including at his sister's wedding earlier in the year. It was also revealed that the CJNG was struggling to gain influence in territory controlled by the Santa Rosa de Lima Cartel. On 26 June 2020, Mexico City police chief Omar Garcia Harfuch survived an assassination attempt which saw him suffer injuries from three bullet wounds. Two of his bodyguards and a female pedestrian were killed in the assassination attempt as well. While Tweeting from his hospital bed, Garcia blamed the CJNG for the failed attempt on his life and had 12 suspected CJNG members arrested by the end of the day. The same day, it emerged that the CJNG still controlled organized crime in Jalisco, Guanajuato, Querétaro, Hidalgo, but no longer was listed as having such control in any municipality in Veracruz and still was unable to take away territory in other parts of southeastern Mexico controlled by the Sinaloa Cartel, Los Zetas and the so-called Los Pelones group.

Sánchez was later murdered, with his body being discovered stabbed and wrapped in plastic on a park bench in downtown Tlaquepaque on 18 March 2021. Emilio Alejandro Pulido Salazar would surrender to Mexican authorities the same month. Érick Valencia Salazar, alias "El 85", was presumed to be the head of the Nuevo Plaza Cartel at the time of El Cholo's death. In February 2022, leading CJNG operator in Michoacán and trusted El Mencho associate Miguel Ángel Fernández, known as "El M2", was found murdered in the town of Cansangüe, located in the municipality of Tepalcatepec El 85 was later captured by Mexican authorities in September 2022.

By November 2021, El Mencho and his wife Rosalinda's younger sisters were the only CJNG members to remain at large who were also among the cartel's original founders.

In May 2022, Insight Crime reporter Peter Appleby reported that El Mencho's poor health, and also rumored death, accelerated break-ups and infighting in the CJNG. Another notable CJNG defection was self-proclaimed El Mencho loyalist José Bernabé Brizuela Meraz, alias "La Vaca", who was presumed to now be head of the smaller Mezcales, also known as Cartel Independiente de Colima. By this point in time, Mezcales, which previously acted as the CJNG's local enforcers, were no longer affiliated with CJNG.

In February 2023, the Supreme Court of Justice of the Nation dismissed Jalisco-based federal magistrate judge Isidro Avelar Gutiérrez y Roberto Sandoval Castañeda from his judicial duties as a result of his ties to the CJNG.

=== Death of El Mencho and impact ===
On 22 February 2026, El Mencho was killed by the Mexican military in Tapalpa, Jalisco. Widespread violence erupted in Mexico as a result of retaliation attacks from the CJNG. Mexico City-based security consultant David Saucedo informed CNN that due to El Mencho's son Rubén Oseguera González ("El Menchito") being jailed in the United States, the line of succession "has been broken," with no clear family successor. The arrest of El Menchito would leave only one brother and El Mencho's stepson Juan Carlos Valencia Gonzalez ("El Pelón"), though El Pelon lacked "influence among other cartel commanders." Saucedo stated that was "likely that one of four or five top commanders will emerge as the next leader," and named CJNG leaders Ricardo Ruiz Velasco ("El Doble R"), Audias Flores ("El Jardinero" or "The Gardener"), Hugo Mendoza Gaytan ("El Sapo") and a fourth figure – El Mencho's former head of security – about whom little is known, as the most likely candidates to succeed El Mencho. In addition it was soon afterwards revealed by El Pais that El Mencho's brother Abraham, who was arrested in Mexico in February 2025, was actually in fact still "in the hands of Mexican authorities." The U.S. Director of National Intelligence's (DNI) National Counterterrorism Center has stated that El Pelón was the "de facto second-in-command" to El Mencho, with $5 million bounties being issued each for El Pelon and El Jardinero. David Mora, an expert at the Crisis Group analysis center, noted to AFP that due to his lack of direct succession, with his son being held in the United States, El Mencho's death created a power vacuum in the CJNG, with this power vacuum also being a major reason for the escalation in violence, stating "in the absence of a direct succession, a power vacuum is created that opens the door to violent realignments within the organization." Former DEA Chief of International Operations Mike Vigil stated to CBS News that El Mencho's death was prominent and that Mexico could seize on the moment to launch "an effective frontal assault based on intelligence," while also acknowledging that "This is a big opportunity for Mexico and the United States if they work together."

El Jardinero would eventually be captured in April 2026. According to Mexican Secretary of the Navy Raymundo Pedro Morales Ángeles, El Jardinero at the time served as “the second in command of the CJNG" and had been "one of the most trusted men (of El Mencho)." However, following El Mencho's death, he also made a major attempt to seize control of the CJNG, mobilizing “personnel, weapons and resources with the aim of taking over the power of the criminal organization.”

=== El Mencho successor named ===
On 18 March 2026, the Wall Street Journal reported that a US Citizen named Juan Carlos Valencia González ("El Pelón"), who also uses the aliases "El Pelon," "El Tricky Tres," "03," "El 3," and "Pelacas," was now the CJNG's new leader. On 6 April 2026, El Pais would confirm that Valencia Gonzalez, El Mencho's stepson through his marriage to Rosalinda González Valencia, had successfully worked his way through the power vacuum created by El Mencho's death to succeed him as head of the CJNG as well. However, at the time of his capture in April 2026, it was acknowledged that CJNG second-in-command Audias Flores Silva ("El Jardinero") was making an effort to lead the organization as well.

== Arrests ==
On 13 July 2011, operations chief and one of the founders of the organization, Martin Arzola Ortega, was arrested. On 7 August 2012, it was announced that Ortega's successor, Eliot Alberto Radillo Peza, was captured in Zapopan, Jalisco. At the time of Peza's arrest, it was announced that twelve suspected members of the Jalisco Nueva Generacion cartel, including leaders Martin Arzola and Abundio Mendoza Gaytan, had been arrested since July 2011 on extortion, kidnapping and drug charges.

On 9 March 2012, another founder of the organization, Érick Valencia Salazar, alias El 85, was captured by the Mexican Army along with another high-ranking lieutenant in Zapopan, Jalisco. Their apprehensions prompted over a dozen blockades throughout the city. 26 public transportation buses were burned with gasoline and then used to block the city streets. More than 30 assault rifles, grenades, cartridges, and ammunition magazines were confiscated. Felipe Calderón, the president of Mexico, congratulated the Mexican army for the capture of Érick Valencia Salazar.

The Matazetas (CJNG) later apologized for the blockades by putting up several banners throughout the Guadalajara metropolitan area. They wrote that the blockades were "only a reaction for messing with their CJNG companion", who reportedly dedicated his work to "maintain tranquility in the state of Jalisco." On 18 March 2012, José Guadalupe Serna Padilla, another ranking lieutenant in the cartel, was captured along with another cartel member as well. On 15 April 2012, Marco Antonio Reyes, reported to be the head of the cartel's gunmen, was captured in Veracruz along with five of his associates. The arrests also led to the capture of three other cartel members, including the head of the cartel's operations in the Veracruz cities of Veracruz and Boca del Río.

On 30 January 2014, Mexican authorities arrested Rubén Oseguera González (alias "El Menchito"), the second-in-command in the cartel and the son of Nemesio Oseguera Cervantes, the organization's leader. Rubén was eventually extradited to the United States in 2020, where he was convicted in two criminal trials which took place in September 2024, and given a life sentence in March 2025. On 1 May 2015, a Mexican army helicopter was shot at and forced to land in what Jalisco's Governor Aristoteles Sandoval described as "a reaction to an operation to detain leaders of this cartel". On 28 May 2018, they arrested Rosalinda González Valencia, who is the wife of Cervantes.

From 2015 to 2025, prominent CJNG leaders who were also brother-in-laws of El Mencho, Abigael González Valencia, Gerardo González Valencia, and José González Valencia was arrested and extradited to the United States at later dates. While in the United States, Gerardo was given a life sentence in July 2023 after accepting a guilty plea related to drug trafficking charges, while José was given a 30 year sentence after accepting a guilty plea to less extreme drug trafficking charges in June 2025. In January 2016, fellow El Mencho brother-in-law Elvis González Valencia was arrested as well, though he was later released in December 2016. In 2018, two more El Mencho brother-in-laws, Arnulfo and Ulises Gonzalez Valencia, was arrested as well. In May 2019, the U.S. government acknowledged that Ulises Gonzalez Valencia, a key CJNG leader who had been issued new Office of Foreign Assets Control sanctions, had in fact been arrested in 2018.

In July 2018, Mexican authorities arrested José Guadalupe Rodríguez Castillo (alias 'El 15'), a local leader of the cartel. His arrest is related to the disappearance of three Italian businessmen in the Southern Jalisco town of Tecalitlán in January 2018.

In March 2019, a senior CJNG leader, who chose to remain anonymous and was only identified as "El 20", was arrested by Mexican authorities. "El 20", who remained anonymous, was second-in-command to the CJNG. More than 80 elements of 41 Military Zone, as well as the Navy, and the Federal Police, as well as four CJNG members who also remained anonymous, were also arrested with "El 20."

In April 2019, Adrián Alonso Guerrero Covarrubias, known as "El 8" or "El M", was arrested for drug trafficking and kidnapping. Guerrero served as head of the cartel's operations in the Ciénega and northern Los Altos regions in Jalisco and all of southeastern Guanajuato, and is the godson to cartel leader Nemesio Oseguera Cervantes.

In February 2020, El Mencho's daughter Jessica Johana, 33, known as "La Negra" was arrested in Washington D.C. when she went to see her brother Rubén who was extradited in the US for drug trafficking. She was charged with engaging in transactions or dealings in properties with businesses blacklisted by the Treasury Department and providing financial support to the CJNG. She pleaded guilty on 12 March 2021, and on 11 June was sentenced to 2 1/2 years in prison.

On 11 March 2020, the U.S. Drug Enforcement Administration (DEA) arrested 600 people and seized more than a ton and a half of narcotics. This is the DEA's largest-ever strike against CJNG. The number of arrests was revised to 750, with 250 arrests occurring in the United States.

On 10 April 2020, Oseguera's Chicago area lieutenant Luis Alderate was arrested. Other high-level associates of Oseguera prosecuted in Chicago include Diego Pineda-Sanchez, sentenced to 15 years in prison for laundering money for him and other drug kingpins, and Carlos Perra-Pedroza, sentenced to 13 years in prison for similar charges. Alderate's brother Roberto Alderete was arrested in Kentucky in 2018 with two pounds of methamphetamine. On 11 April 2020, CJNG cell leader María del Carmen Albarrán was arrested in the Venustiano Carranza borough of Mexico City.

In May 2020, it was reported that former CJNG security chief Enrique Alejandro Pizano, who was arrested in September 2015 died in a Jalisco prison on 13 May 2020 due to COVID-19.

On 28 June 2020, it was reported that the number of CJNG members arrested for 26 June 2020 assassination attempt of the Mexican City Police Chief had grown to 19.

On 1 July 2020, it was announced that CJNG hitman Jaime Tafolla Ortega, a.k.a. "El Alacran" (The Scorpion), was arrested on 28 June 2020. According to a statement released by the Mexican Attorney General's Office, he is suspected of gunning down Judge Uriel Villegas Ortiz and his wife, Veronica Barajas, on 16 June 2020 and leading 29 April 2020 abduction of Colima state Representative Anel Bueno Sanchez, whose body was found in a clandestine grave on 2 June 2020. Judge Villegas had gained notoriety in 2018 when he ordered the transfer of Rubén Oseguera from a jail in Oaxaca to a maximum security prison in Jalisco. A second suspect was arrested with Tafolla, though he has not yet been charged.

On 15 November 2021, Rosalinda González Valencia was recaptured in Zapopan, Jalisco. The Mexican Ministry of Defense released a statement describing her arrest as "a significant blow to the financial structure of organized crime in the state", with evidence pointing to her role in "the illicit financial operation of an organized crime group." At the time, five of her brothers and two of her children were all now incarcerated as well. A Oseguera brother was still incarcerated as well. In December 2023, Rosalinda was given a five year prison sentence after being convicted for failing to disclose transactions of a car wash she owned in Puerto Vallarta, Jalisco. However, she was given an early release in February 2025.

On 20 December 2022, El Mencho's brother Antonio Oseguera, alias "El Tony Montana," was captured while in possession of weapons in a suburb of Guadalajara. El Tony Montana was said to have overseen violent actions and logistics, and bought weapons and laundered money for the cartel.

On 19 November 2024, El Mencho's son-in-law Cristian Fernando Gutierrez-Ochoa, a high ranking CJNG leader and romantic partner of El Mencho's daughter Laisha who notably faked his death and took up residency in California under an assumed identity, was arrested in Riverside, California. On 20 June 2025, Gutierrez-Ochoa, also known as "El Gaucho", pled guilty in the United States to one count of international money laundering conspiracy, with the charge resulting in him facing a maximum penalty of 20 years in prison. In his guilty plea, El Gaucho admitted to being vital to CJNG's money laundering operation, especially from at least 2023 up to his arrest in 2024, using sophisticated money laundering methods involving real estate transactions, shell companies, and international money transfers in order to launder CJNG's drug trafficking proceeds. On 18 December 2025, Gutierrez-Ochoa was sentenced to serve 140 months (more than 11 years) in a U.S. federal prison.

On 28 February 2025, El Mencho's older brother Abraham, also known "Don Rodo", was recaptured by Mexican authorities. The arrest came a year after Don Rodo was briefly imprisoned for nine days after being arrested in April 2024. Regarded as a founder of CJNG, Don Rodo was vital to the cartel's money laundering and property purchasing operations, reportedly also working alongside CJNG notary public offices in Ciudad Guzmán and Autlán de Navarro to manage changes of ownership of the properties he purchased for El Mencho. In February 2026, it was reported that Abraham was still "in the hands of Mexican authorities" since his February 2025 arrest.

On 27 April 2026 Mexican special forces arrested Audias Flores Silva, who is considered a potential successor to "El Mencho", leading the El Jalisco cartel. The Mexican Navy confirmed that the operation to arrest Silva resulted from 19 months of surveillance and also involved more than 500 personnel, six helicopters, and intelligence and reconnaissance aircraft. According to Mexican Secretary of the Navy the operation had in fact started in October 2024 “when the Mexican Navy activated intelligence efforts focused on a priority target (Flores Silva) linked to one of the country’s main criminal organizations (the CJNG). From that moment on, a discreet and sustained systematic follow-up was carried out, based on field intelligence, intelligence gathering, and international cooperation.”

== Recent extraditions ==
On 29 April 2024, prominent El Mencho associate Juan Manuel Abouzaid El Bayeh, also known as "El Escorpion," was arrested in Mexico and then immediately extradited to the United States.

On 27 February 2025, Antonio Oseguera was among 29 suspected Mexican drug trafficking figures who were extradited to the United States.

In August 2025, Mexico extradited 26 individuals accused of involvement in major drug-trafficking organizations, including the CJNG and the Sinaloa Cartel, to the United States. The extraditions were conducted under U.S. pressure, with assurances that the death penalty would not be pursued. This marked the second large-scale extradition of alleged cartel members in 2025, following a similar transfer in February. These actions reflect ongoing cooperation between Mexico and U.S. authorities in combating transnational organized crime. Among those extradited included the imprisoned head of CJNG's Los Cuinis fraction, Abigael González Valencia.

== Current operations and territories ==
Elite Group
- Grupo Élite
- Active: 2018/2019–present
- Country: Mexico
- Branch: Los Deltas
- Type: Special operations wing
- Role: Paramilitary enforcement arm
- Part of: Jalisco New Generation Cartel
- Headquarters: Jalisco
- Engagements: Mexican drug war

Commanders
- Notable commanders: Juan Carlos Valencia González

As of 2020, despite the group's rapid expansion, the CJNG does not necessarily control every area it is present in. It is, however, the dominant criminal actor in Jalisco, Nayarit, Colima, the port of Lázaro Cárdenas in Michoacán, the eastern state of Veracruz and in the oil-rich central region of Guanajuato, Puebla, Querétaro and Hidalgo. It is also strong, although facing stern rivalries, in the border cities of Tijuana and Juárez, Tierra Caliente – the area which covers parts of Michoacán, Guerrero, and the State of Mexico, as well as the Riviera Maya. The group has shown it may be focusing on entering the capital, after a brazen attack against Mexico City's public security secretary in June 2020. Internationally, the cartel has contacts in Colombia, Peru, Bolivia, the United States, Central America, Canada, Australia, China and Southeast Asia, which help it control large parts of marijuana, cocaine and synthetic drug trafficking in Mexico. On 31 March 2021, a show of force and a massacre of rivals was reported in the Aguililla municipality, the birthplace of "El Mencho", an avocado growing area and also a center of drug cooking within the Tierra Caliente.

According to the Secretariat of Finance and Public Credit in Mexico City, the cartel has territory within the regions of Jalisco, Nayarit, Aguascalientes, Colima, Guanajuato, Veracruz, Baja California, Baja California Sur, Sonora, Sinaloa, Chihuahua, Coahuila, Zacatecas, the Islas Marías, Michoacán, Guerrero, Oaxaca, Quintana Roo, Chiapas, Tabasco, Querétaro, Tamaulipas, Hidalgo, San Luis Potosí, Edomex, Morelos and Puebla.

CJNG has allegedly threatened the lives of President Andrés Manuel López Obrador, Alfonso Durazo, Secretary of Security and Citizen Protection of the government of Mexico; Marcelo Ebrard, Secretary of Foreign Relations; Santiago Nieto, head of the Financial Intelligence Unit; Omar García Harfuch, Secretary of Public Security of Jalisco; and Enrique Alfaro Ramírez, Governor of Jalisco.

CJNG has used violence to control local communities, other organizations, and politics. Politics in the regions where CJNG has control are skewed, and citizens have little options to combat the cartel. The threat to Mexico's political stability is apparent in the deaths CJNG was responsible for in the 2018 election cycle. The death of over 130 political candidates in just one year is a striking reminder of how much CJNG controls areas of Mexico. Political candidates are not the only victims of CJNG's violence. As of 2020, CJNG is believed to have killed thousands of civilians (Sieff 2020).

The cartel has also been known to use propaganda. The group tried to show outwardly "altruistic" actions in strategic areas during the COVID-19 pandemic. In June 2020, for example, the group distributed toys to children in communities in Veracruz where it is fighting splinter groups from Los Zetas. Members of the CJNG also delivered boxes of goods in various parts of the country, including Guadalajara, Mexico's second-largest city. Through online videos, the Jalisco New Generation Cartel has tried to seek society's approval and tacit consent from the Mexican government to confront Los Zetas by posing as a "righteous" and "nationalistic" group. Such claims have stoked fears that Mexico, just like Colombia a generation before, may be witnessing the rise of paramilitary drug gangs.

As of September 2021, the Jalisco Cartel has recently made increasing advancements into the southern regions of Mexico such as Chiapas near the Guatemalan border where it is facing an escalating dispute for territory with its arch-rival the Sinaloa Cartel. The CJNG has also been making advancements and increased shows of force within Guatemala as well with threats towards members of law enforcement who reportedly recently 'stole' a load of drugs from the organization. However, the cartel would take a notable hit on 15 November 2021 with the arrest of Oseguera's wife Rosalinda González Valencia, alias "La Jefa", who was found to be in control of the CJNG's finances. In addition to being the wife of Oseguera and running the CJNG's money laundering operations, González came from a family which was tied to drug trafficking and was also instrumental in aiding the CJNG's development. Rumors also surfaced in February 2022 that El Mencho died in a private hospital in Guadalajara. This would later be backed by narcomantas (banners displaying warnings to police and other cartels) which appeared around the city of Colima, and which were written by Mezcales, which up until this report of El Mencho's death, acted as the CJNG's local enforcers.

=== Financial operations ===
It is difficult to trace the financial movements of the CJNG given its multifaceted and illegal nature, but some estimate their assets to be worth over $20 billion. The main source of revenue for the cartel is the trade of illegal drugs, which is extremely profitable with markets in the United States and the EU. Money laundering through real estate investments, front businesses, cryptocurrency, and offshore financial institutes help the CJNG to disguise and distribute large sums. Key to the cartel's large revenue gains is its rapid geographic expansion; the CJNG has captured key ports of entry along the Gulf and the Pacific since its rise in 2009, increasing its ability to extract key elements of the illegal drug supply chain.

Although the CJNG generates significant revenues from narco-trafficking, the takeover of non-drug related industries, which often capitalize on the expertise of local gangs who have been absorbed by the CJNG, help the cartel to create more immediate revenues and establish regional control. A variety of peripheral operations, such as extortion of tortilla, avocado, lime, and chicken industries, as well as fuel theft and counterfeit time-share dealings, help the CJNG to accumulate revenue to fund the trafficking of illegal drugs like fentanyl, cocaine, and methamphetamine into the United States.

The cartel relies on the extortion of agricultural farms, recently profiting greatly off of Mexico's 'green gold', avocados. They generate revenue by extorting pre-existing producers, and illegally establish their own farms with help from corrupt federal officials. Similar market manipulations have taken place in the tortilla, lime, and chicken markets. As opposed to the Sinaloa Cartel, which operates by inserting their authority into entire vertical supply chains, the CJNG generally taxes across the market, taxing a wide variety of businesses at the same level of the value chain.

Pemex, the nationalized Mexican oil company, has lost hundreds of millions of dollars to fuel theft, to which the CJNG, as well as several other Mexican organized crime groups have been linked. Illegally drilled pipelines extract fuel which is then sold for exaggerated rent on the black market.

Individuals, as well as several Mexican companies, have been sanctioned for their complicity in timeshare fraud with the CJNG, whereby third-party scammers rob timeshare owners of their money by entering into a fictitious deal and demanding premature taxes and fees to 'expedite' the sales process.

=== Impact of El Mencho's influence through his marriage ===
Following El Mencho's death in February 2026, it was reported that El Mencho had actually gained influence in the CJNG through his marriage to Rosalinda González Valencia. Despite the influence he obtained through his marriage to Valencia, he was acknowledged to have separated from her in 2018, and was even involved with a different romantic partner at the time of his death in February 2026. Nevertheless, El Mencho's stepson was regarded to be his "de facto second-in-command" by the time of his death. As of result of his marriage to Valencia, who is also the niece of Milenio Cartel founder Armando Valencia Cornelio, alias “El Maradona,” El Mencho was able to recruit numerous former Mileno Cartel members into the CJNG. El Mencho's stepson, Juan Carlos Valencia González, would even succeed him as head of the CJNG by March 2026. Juan is acknowledged to be Valencia's son from her previous marriage to Cornelio.

== See also ==
- Crime in Mexico
- Jalisco extermination camp
- Maritime drug trafficking in Latin America
- Mérida Initiative
- María Guadalupe López Esquivel
