= Milenio Cartel =

Defunct Mexican criminal organization

- Founded by: Armando Valencia Cornelio
- Founding location: Uruapan, Michoacán, Mexico
- Years active: 1970s–2010
- Territory: Mexico: Michoacán, Colima, Jalisco, Mexico City, Puebla, Nuevo León and Tamaulipas; United States: California, Oregon, Texas, Illinois, North Carolina, Maryland
- Ethnicity: Mexican
- Activities: Drug trafficking, money laundering, murder and arms trafficking.
- Allies: Sinaloa Cartel; La Resistencia
- Rivals: Gulf Cartel; Knights Templar Cartel
- Notable members: Erick Valencia Salazar (“El 85”) Armando Valencia Cornelio (“El Maradona”) Juan Carlos Valencia Gonzalez (“El 03”)

The Milenio Cartel (Spanish: Cártel del Milenio), originally and alternatively called the Cártel de los Valencia, (Note: Meaning 'Millennium Cartel' and 'Valencia Family Cartel' respectively.) was a Mexican criminal organization founded in Michoacán in the 1970s by members of the Valencia Family. It relocated to Jalisco in the early 2000s.

The cartel began to fracture by 2009, and ceased to exist by 2010; it is the predecessor to the Jalisco New Generation Cartel and the United Cartels gang.

== History ==
=== Founding by the Valencia Family ===
The Milenio Cartel first appeared in the late 1970s when the Valencia family, an avocado farmer family from Tamaulipas, started to grow cannabis and opium poppies in Jalisco and Michoacán for sale to bigger cartels. The cartel was founded by Armando Valencia Cornelio (“El Maradona”), alongside his cousins Erick Valencia Salazar (“El 85”), Luis and Ventura Valencia Valencia. Other family members would join the cartel over time.

The cartel operated in at least six Mexican states: Michoacán, Colima, Jalisco, Mexico City, Nuevo León and Tamaulipas, where it produced marijuana and heroin. By the mid-1990s, the cartel had close connections with Colombian traffickers like Fabio Ochoa Vásquez of the Medellín Cartel, and began working with synthetic drugs provided by Zhenli Ye Gon by early 2003.

Armando Valencia Cornelio was arrested in Guadalajara on August 15, 2003 by members of the Mexican Military and Mexican Attorney General’s Office. Luis Valencia Valencia and Óscar Nava Valencia (“El Lobo”) took control of the cartel, and Nava Valencia associated the Milenio Cartel with the Sinaloa Cartel in order to protect their own structure. As a result, the Milenio Cartel became a branch of what was known as the Sinaloa Federation, under the direct orders of Ignacio Coronel Villarreal. Óscar Nava and his brother Juan Nava Valencia (“El Tigre”) would become responsible for the planning and smuggling of cocaine shipments into the United States from Central and South America through the Port of Manzanillo in Colima.

On October 28, 2009, Óscar Nava Valencia was captured following a gunfight with Mexican Army troops in Tlajomulco de Zúñiga, Jalisco. Juan Nava Valencia took over the leadership of the Milenio Cartel until May 6, 2010, when he was arrested in Guadalajara during an operation by the Mexican Army.

=== Fracture and formation of the CJNG and United Cartels ===
In the period between the 2009 capture of Óscar Nava Valencia and the 2010 assassination of Sinaloa Federation leader Ignacio Coronel Villarreal, a power vacuum within the Milenio Cartel emerged. The cartel would break into smaller factions, with the two primary groups being La Resistencia, headed by Ramiro González (“El Molca”), and the Jalisco New Generation Cartel (CJNG), headed by Nemesio Rubén Oseguera Cervantes ("El Mencho"); a turf war for control of the former territory of the Milenio Cartel started.

La Resistencia formed a brief alliance with Los Zetas to oppose the CJNG, who by then referred to themselves as matazetas ('Zeta-killers') and united with the Sinaloa Cartel. Other former members that splintered from both the CJNG’s alliance with the Sinaloa Cartel and La Resistencia’s alliance with Los Zetas went independent and joined La Familia Michoacana (itself a splinter group of Los Zetas) or the Gulf Cartel, following Los Zetas’ separation from the Gulf Cartel in 2010. However, when La Familia Michoacana disbanded in 2011, some former Milenio Cartel members relocated to Guadalajara and forged a loose alliance with a faction of Los Zetas.

While this dissolution meant that some factions of the Milenio Cartel and Valencia family were now at war with each other, the core of the Valencia family aligned with the CJNG and Oseguera Cervantes, due to his marriage with Valencia family member Rosalinda González Valencia (“La Jefa”), who is also the niece and ex-wife of former Milenio leader Armando Valencia Cornelio as well as the mother of future CJNG leader Juan Carlos Valencia González.

=== Convictions of former leaders ===
On January 29, 2011, Óscar Nava Valencia was extradited to the United States to face charges of conspiracy and drug trafficking in the Southern District of Texas. He was sentenced to 25 years in prison on January 8, 2014.

Armando Valencia Cornelio was released from prison early by July 2020, and was confirmed to be suffering from cancer. By March 2026, Armando was still described as having only been a leader in the Milenio Cartel, and in April 2026 was also confirmed as uninvolved in drug trafficking since his arrest in 2003.

== See also ==
- Mexican drug war
- Mérida Initiative
- War on drugs
- Avocado production in Mexico
