= José González Valencia =

Mexican criminal (born 1975)

- Born: 18 May 1975 (age 51); Aguililla, Michoacán, Mexico
- Other names: Chepa; Jafett Arias Becerra
- Employer: Jalisco New Generation Cartel (suspected)
- Criminal charge: Drug trafficking
- Criminal penalty: 30 year Imprisonment
- Criminal status: Imprisoned in the U.S.

Notes
- Pled guilty in United States District Court for the District of Columbia to drug trafficking

José González Valencia (Spanish pronunciation: [xoˈse ɣon'sales βa'lenθja]; born 18 May 1975) is a Mexican suspected drug lord and former high-ranking leader of the Jalisco New Generation Cartel (CJNG), a criminal group based in Jalisco. He is part of a clan that heads a CJNG money laundering branch known as Los Cuinis. Since 2015, González Valencia reportedly held a leading role within the CJNG as the security chief of Nemesio Oseguera Cervantes (alias "El Mencho"), the top leader of the criminal group. Security forces in the U.S. and Mexico suspect he was also responsible for coordinating drug trafficking operations from Mexico to the U.S., Asia, and Europe.

As the Mexican government crackdown on the CJNG, González Valencia fled to Bolivia in September 2015 using a Mexican passport with a fake name. Bolivian officials were not able to decipher his real identity because his alias was not on the Interpol watch-list and his passport had all international security features in place. He lived in Bolivia for two years, obtained a Bolivian foreigner ID card, and was granted temporary residency. In December 2017, he flew to Brazil to spend time with his family during Christmas and was arrested by the Federal Police. Brazilian authorities confirmed that the arrest was part of a request from the U.S. government for his extradition. In November 2021 he was extradited to the United States to face international cocaine trafficking charges. In June 2025, he received a 30 year prison sentence after pleading guilty to drug trafficking charges.

== Early life and background ==
José González Valencia, also known by his alias "El Chepa", "Camarón" (English: Shrimp), and "Santy", was born in Aguililla, Michoacán, Mexico. Other sources cite his real name as José María González Valencia and his alias "El Chema". According to his Bolivian ID card that was issued to him under the fake name Jafett Arias Becerra, (Note: The Bolivian foreigner ID card was issued by the General Service of Personal Identification (SEGIP). It expired until 22 March 2019, and stated that he was a Mexican national. The ID's unique identifier was E-10269139.) he was born on 18 May 1975. His parents were J. Abigael González Mendoza (father) and Estela Valencia Farías (mother). (Note: Other sources state that Estela Valencia Farías may be González Valencia's half sister. She was described as older than the rest of his siblings.) According to the Mexican government, the González Valencia clan was made up of 18 siblings. The males are Abigael, José María, Arnulfo, Ulises Jovani, Elvis, Édgar Edén, Mauricio, Gerardo, José and Luis Ángel. (Note: Ulises Jovani is sometimes spelled as Ulises Giovanni.) The females are Rosalinda (also known as Rosalía), Noemí, Berenice, Marisa Ivette, María Elena, Érika and Abigaíl. People in their hometown nicknamed the clan "Cuinis" in reference to a squirrel (spermophilus adocetus) from the area that is known as "Cuinique". It is common for this squirrel to have over a dozen babies each time the mother gives birth.

Several of his siblings have been suspected of working for the Jalisco New Generation Cartel (CJNG), a criminal group based in Jalisco, and its allied branch known as Los Cuinis. His family's involvement in the drug trade dates back to Armando Valencia Cornelio (alias "El Maradona"), who founded the Milenio Cartel in the 1970s in Michoacán and Guerrero. His family, including González Valencia and his siblings, continued the family business for the following years.

== Criminal career in Mexico ==
On 1 August 2005, González Valencia and his siblings Abigael and Édgar were nearly killed in an attack carried out by a group of armed men in a cockfighting arena in Tonalá, Jalisco. Armed men stormed the arena and attacked the spectators with AK-47 assault rifles and grenades. Four people were killed and twenty-eight more were injured, including González Valencia (who was shot in the arm) and Antonio Oseguera Cervantes (alias "Tony Montana), a suspected high-ranking member of the CJNG. Among those killed was Saúl Díaz Oseguera (alias "El Cangrejo"), allied to González Valencia. When security forces arrived at the scene, they discovered that several of the cockfighting attendees were also in possession of assault rifles and bullet-proof vehicles. However, the Government of Jalisco did not make any arrests at the scene since they did not consider it necessary to arrest the victims of the attack.

In Mexico, González Valencia had several open criminal investigations against him in multiple states. In Jalisco, he had a pending arrest warrant in a civil court for a homicide charge. Mexican prosecutors believe he was behind the murder of Jesús Álvarez Gallegos, Jalisco's Secretary of Tourism, in Zapopan on 9 March 2013. According to Jonathan García García's (alias "John Perro") confession, the alleged assassin, it was González Valencia who ordered the murder directly to him from his in-law Nemesio Oseguera Cervantes (alias "El Mencho"), the top leader of the CJNG. The reason for the murder, John Perro claimed, was because the CJNG believed he was laundering money on behalf of the Knights Templar Cartel, a rival gang of the CJNG. The murder instructions from González Valencia stated that Álvarez Gallegos should not be alive past the weekend; he was killed on a Saturday as he was leaving a meeting with the Governor of Jalisco.

Mexican authorities suspect that González Valencia played a key role in the CJNG during his time in Mexico. They believe he was the security chief of El Mencho in 2015. He is also accused of leading the CJNG's expansion in Mexico over the drug territories once controlled by the Knights Templar Cartel in Michoacán. The Attorney General of Mexico (PGR) suspects that when his brother Abigael (alias "El Cuini") was arrested in Mexico in 2015, he reportedly took control of his CJNG tasks, and led multiple attacks against security forces in Jalisco during his tenure. Later that year, he fled Mexico and settled in Bolivia.

According to the Center for Research and National Security (CISEN), Mexico's intelligence agency, González Valencia headed the financial operations of the CJNG and managed the group's alliances with other criminal networks in Asia and Europe, where the CJNG sends narcotics from Mexico. In addition, the CISEN alleged that González Valencia managed the relationship with arms traffickers in the United States and Central America. One of his closest business partners within the CJNG was a man named Rogelio Guízar Camorlinga (alias "El Doctor") from Michoacán. Security force allege that El Doctor was responsible for killing rival gangsters of the CJNG and police officers who oppose them. El Doctor was originally a medic in Michoacán that turned to organized crime by allying himself with other CJNG members who were originally from his home state.

=== Residence in Bolivia ===
In September 2015, González Valencia flew into Santa Cruz de la Sierra in Bolivia from Lima, Peru. He entered using a Mexican passport with the fake name Jafett Arias Becerra. According to Bolivia's General Directorate of Migration (DIGEMIG), González Valencia's passport was official and had all the international security features in place. The passport was certified by the DIGEMIG upon his arrival in the country, but they later clarified after González Valencia was arrested that they were not aware that the information in the passport was false. They stated his Mexican passport was issued in 2013 and expired in 2023. With his Mexican passport, the DIGEMIG explained, González Valencia was able to apply for one-year temporary residency in Bolivia and get a foreigner ID card from the General Service of Personal Identification (SEGIP). He was able to get temporary residency through a Bolivian national who González Valencia was close to and who agreed to be responsible for his financial support.

On 22 March 2017, González Valencia started an application to extend his one-year temporary residency to a two-year one that included work eligibility. He applied to this application using his alias, and issued a work petition form to the city of Santa Cruz de la Sierra through a law firm. His two-year residency was later approved. The DIGEMIG explained to the press that González Valencia was also able to enter the country because the Interpol had not issued a red alert against the name Jafett Arias Becerra, which González Valencia used to enter the country and apply for residency. The Bolivian government argued that they did not have enough information to investigate González Valencia's background because of the lack of information on foreign criminals. Henry Baldelomar, head of the DIGEMIG in Santa Cruz, stated that this incident was the Mexican government's fault because they were the ones who initially gave González Valencia a passport with a fake name. With his fake name, González Valencia lived in Bolivia for two years.

Faustino Alfonso Mendoza Arce, the police commander of the National Police of Bolivia, said the police would investigate who were responsible for giving González Valencia a Bolivian foreigner ID card and his temporary residency. The swiftness in how González Valencia obtained his foreigner ID card raised suspicions because the application process usually takes between one and three years and requires legal residency. The process also includes a background check in the applicant's home country, which meant that if done correctly, González Valencia's drug trafficking allegations would have been uncovered. (Note: In October 2017, Bolivia issued ID cards to twelve Peruvian nationals suspected of being involved in drug trafficking. They were wanted by Peru's Antidrug Directorate (DIANDRO). Six of the ID cards stated that the men were Bolivian citizens and were under assumed aliases.) The DIGEMIG stated the issuing of the ID card was not plagued with irregularities because González Valencia was not wanted by the INTERPOL and had a work sponsor. Politicians, however, asked the Minister of Government (es) Carlos Romero to open up an investigation towards the DIGEMIG and the police for issuing the ID card to González Valencia. They highlighted that six months prior to this incident, the CJNG had reportedly laundered money at the Asociación Cruceña de Fútbol (es), a Bolivian football league based out of Santa Cruz de la Sierra, where González Valencia did his residency application.

== Arrest in Brazil ==
On 27 December 2017, González Valencia was arrested by Brazilian authorities outside a beach resort area in Aquiraz, Ceará. Security forces were tracking his footsteps since he arrived in Brazil from the Pinto Martins – Fortaleza International Airport as a tourist on 22 December with a Bolivian foreigner ID card with a fake name, (Note: Another source stated he arrived to Brazil through the São Paulo–Guarulhos International Airport, and then a week later he did a domestic flight to Fortaleza, where he was later arrested.) Jafett Arias Becerra. This entire surveillance that led to his arrest was coordinated from the Federal Police's main headquarters in Brasília. According to the Brazilian police, they discovered he was in Brazil immediately upon landing when he checked-in, but decided not to approach him at the airport and instead followed him to where he was going. The police checked in their security system to retrieve information from him, and also looked into hotel registration lists and rental car companies to track his movements in Brazil. He was vacationing in Brazil for Christmas holidays with his family and rented a beach house in Taíba beach. The houses he rented were done through a strawperson. González Valencia traveled alone from Bolivia and was meeting his family in Brazil. In Brazil, he was accompanied by his wife, their child, and some friends. (Note: According to another source, González Valencia was with his wife, friends, and six of his children.) According to the police, he was planning to stay in Brazil until 3 January.

When the police surrounded him in the resort area, he did not resist arrest. He was sent to the headquarters of the Federal Police of Brazil in Fortaleza, Ceará, where officials later confirmed that there was a pending arrest warrant and extradition request against him from the United States. None of the people who were with him at the moment of his arrest were apprehended by the police because there were no arrest warrants against them. According to the Supreme Federal Court (STF), Brazil's highest court system, the request from the U.S. authorities was made because of González Valencia's alleged participation in drug trafficking in Mexico and the U.S as a member of the CJNG. Bolivian authorities stated they would work with Brazil to exchange information and coordinate on the case involving González Valencia. Mexican authorities did not release an official statement on González Valencia's arrest when the news was made public in Brazil. Upon further investigation, Brazilian authorities confirmed that González Valencia had visited Brazil three times with his assumed alias. They said that he was not in Brazil to commit illegal activities and that he would visit for leisure and did not have Brazilian friends. The first time he visited was in 2015, the same year he fled Mexico to avoid prosecution.

The arrest of González Valencia demonstrated the international expansion of the CJNG and Los Cuinis outside of Mexico, and highlighted international cooperation among U.S., Mexico, and South American security forces. Law enforcement officials believe that the CJNG and Los Cuinis were trying to expand their presence in South America to avoid the pressure they were facing in Mexico. In Mexico, where the CJNG and Los Cuinis have a larger presence, the government has led multiple crackdowns that resulted in the arrest of several high-ranking members of both criminal groups. The United States had also imposed economic sanctions and filed charges against the groups and several of their leaders in federal courts. In addition, Brazil is considered an attractive money laundering center for criminal groups, which meant that the González Valencia family was probably looking for business opportunities there. This incident was not the first time the González Valencia clan held operations in South America; in July 2016, González Valencia's brother Gerardo was arrested in Uruguay for money laundering and drug trafficking charges.

== Extradition process ==
=== Beginning of approval process ===
On 23 January 2018, the STF rejected a motion to carry out extradition process against González Valencia in secret. González Valencia's defense wanted the process to be held in secrecy to protect their client and his family, given the fact that the arrest garnered national attention. However, STF judge Carmen Lucia Antunes said they would not make an exception for them because publicity was part of the judicial process. The STF also rejected a motion from González Valencia's defense and the Federal Police, which requested the court to allow González Valencia to be transferred to another prison closer to where his extradition hearings were held. The Federal Police and the defense argued that the prison González Valencia was held at had multiple deficiencies, but the STF responded to the allegations by claiming that no evidence for such claims was presented to them.

On 12 February 2018, González Valencia issued a writ of amparo requesting his extradition, and criticized the Mexican government for not requesting his extradition to Mexico. The request was received by an appeals court based in Mexico City. Judge Jorge Antonio Medina Gaona requested federal authorities to release information on the process they have carried out to try to get González Valencia, a Mexican national, to Mexico. The court hearing was pushed multiple times because the appeals court requested this information from multiple federal agencies, including the Legal Counsel of the Federal Executive (CJEF) (es) and the Secretariat of Foreign Affairs (SRE). The SRE politicians who were specifically mentioned in the writ of amparo were Mónica María Antonieta Velarde Méndez, Luis Videgaray Caso, Carlos Alberto de Icaza González (es), and Carlos Manuel Sada Solana (es).

On 5 March 2018, the STF minister José Celso de Mello Filho agreed to transfer González Valencia to the Federal Penitentiary of Mossoró (pt) from the Regional Superintendence of the Federal Police in Ceará. When the request was initially denied months prior, the Federal Police asked the STF to reconsider the application. The STF looked at the evidence presented and approved the transfer after considering that the federal penitentiary had better security measures, especially during night time, and that there was vacancy for him.

On 16 October 2018, the United States Department of State, Justice, and Treasury announced a joint law enforcement measure against the CJNG, and publicized previously sealed indictments from the United States District Court for the District of Columbia accusing González Valencia of being involved in international drug trafficking. Through the Narcotics Rewards Program, the U.S. government confirmed they were offering up to US$5 million for information that led to his arrest. According to sealed court files under federal judge Beryl A. Howell, González Valencia participated in the distribution of 5 kg (11 lb) or more of cocaine from Mexico and elsewhere for illegal importation into the U.S. from 2006 to 2016. If convicted, the indictment stated that González Valencia would have to forfeit the proceeds he made from the violation.

On 11 December 2018, Celso de Mello approved his extradition process.

=== Extradition and sentence ===
On 10 November 2021, González Valencia was finally extradited to the United States.

On 20 June 2025, González Valencia was sentenced in a Washington D.C. federal court to 30 years in prison after entering a guilty plea.

== See also ==
- Mexican drug war
