= Oseguera =

Oseguera or Osaguera is a Spanish surname. Oseguera comes from a town called Oseguera in the province of Burgos, Spain.

Notable people with the surname:

- Anastasio Bustamante y Oseguera (1780–1853) Served as President of Mexico (1830–32, 1837–39, 1839–41) and Vice‑President (1829–1832)
- Antonio Oseguera Cervantes (born 1958), suspected Mexican drug lord
- Elsa Oseguera (born 1993), Honduran journalist
- Joaquín Esteban Osaguera Peña, Mexican medical researcher
- José Luis Soto Oseguera (born 1974), Mexican politician
- Luis Oseguera (born 1976), Honduran football striker
- Nemesio Oseguera Cervantes (1966–2026), suspected Mexican drug lord, brother of Antonio
- Rubén Oseguera González (born 1990), suspected Mexican drug lord, son of Nemesio
