= Ruben Oseguera =

Ruben Oseguera may refer to:

- Rubén Oseguera Cervantes (b. 1966), alleged leader of the Jalisco New Generation Cartel (CJNG).
- Rubén Oseguera González (b. 1990), alleged second-in-command in the CJNG; imprisoned.
