= Elvis González Valencia =

Mexican criminal (born 1979/80)

- Born: 12 October 1980 (age 46) or 18 March 1979 (age 47); Aguililla, Michoacán, Mexico
- Other names: El Elvis; Alejandro Tapia Castro
- Spouse: Adriana Sánchez Reyna
- Relatives: Abigael González Valencia (brother); Nemesio Oseguera Cervantes (brother-in-law)

Elvis González Valencia (Spanish pronunciation: [ˈelβis ɣonˈsales βaˈlenθja]; born 12 October 1980 or 18 March 1979), commonly referred to by his alias El Elvis (Spanish pronunciation: [el ˈelβis]), is a Mexican suspected drug lord and high-ranking leader of the Jalisco New Generation Cartel (CJNG) and Los Cuinis, two allied criminal groups based in Jalisco. He was reportedly responsible for managing international drug trafficking operations and money laundering schemes under his brother Abigael González Valencia (alias "El Cuini") and brother-in-law Nemesio Oseguera Cervantes (alias "El Mencho").

On 2 January 2016, González Valencia registered at a hospital in Zapopan, Jalisco, using fake identification after suffering several gunshot wounds. He was later arrested there and imprisoned at the Federal Social Readaptation Center No. 1, Mexico's maximum-security prison. He was released in December 2016 after a judge concluded that the evidence against him was insufficient. However, he was later rearrested and was sent back to the Federal Social Readaptation Center No. 1.

== Early life ==
Elvis González Valencia was born on 12 October 1980 in Aguililla, Michoacán, Mexico. His parents were J. Abigael González Mendoza (father) and Estela Valencia Farías (mother). (Note: Other sources state that Estela Valencia Farías may be González Valencia's half sister. She was described as older than the rest of his siblings.) According to the United States Department of the Treasury, he has an alternative date of birth, 18 March 1979, and an alternative legal alias, Alejandro Tapia Castro. He is commonly referred to by his alias "El Elvis". González Valencia also had two Unique Population Registry Codes (CURP), a unique identifier of Mexican citizens and residents.

According to the Mexican government, the González Valencia clan was made up of 18 siblings. The males are Abigael, José María, Arnulfo, Ulises Jovani, Elvis, Édgar Edén, Mauricio, Gerardo, José and Luis Ángel. (Note: Ulises Jovani is sometimes spelled as Ulises Giovanni.) The females are Rosalinda (also known as Rosalía), Noemí, Berenice, Marisa Ivette, María Elena, Érika and Abigaíl. People in their hometown nicknamed the clan "Cuinis" in reference to a ground squirrel (Spermophilus adocetus), commonly known as "Cuinique"; it is common for this squirrel to have litters of over a dozen kits.

== Criminal career ==
González Valencia was suspected by Mexican security forces to be a high-ranking leader and top financial operator of the Jalisco New Generation Cartel (CJNG) and Los Cuinis, two criminal groups based in Jalisco. In 2015, González Valencia's rank within the organizations grew after several of his family members were arrested by Mexican security forces. In 2014–2015, his nephew Rubén Oseguera González was arrested. (Note: Oseguera González was arrested, released from prison, and re-arrested multiple times in less than a year.) his brother Abigael González Valencia (alias "El Cuini") in February 2015; and his in-law Antonio Oseguera Cervantes in December 2015.

Along with his siblings Gerardo, José María, Ulises Jovani, Édgar Edén, and Rosalinda, he began to make major decisions on the financial operations of the two criminal groups. They reported to Nemesio Oseguera Cervantes (alias "El Mencho"), the top leader of the CJNG and one of Mexico's most-wanted drug lords. Oseguera Cervantes is González Valencia's brother-in-law because he is married to his sister Rosalinda. According to Jalisco authorities, he was investigated for three charges: two extortion cases and a property damage charge. At a federal level, the Mexican government was investigating him for his alleged involvement in drug trafficking and money laundering. They believe that he was responsible for directing negotiations with criminal groups in the United States and South America to facilitate his criminal operations internationally.

In the United States, he was sanctioned by the Foreign Narcotics Kingpin Designation Act (also known as the "Kingpin Act") on 27 October 2016, for his alleged involvement in money laundering and/or international drug trafficking. This sanction was a result of an investigation by the Treasury Department and the Drug Enforcement Administration (DEA) office in Los Angeles in an attempt to disrupt the inner circle of the CJNG and affect their finances in Mexico's domestic economy. This sanction was also extended to eight more individuals: Antonio, Julio Alberto Castillo Rodríguez, businessman Fabián Felipe Vera López, attorney María Teresa Quintana Navarro, and four of González Valencia's siblings: Arnulfo, Édgar Edén, Marisa Ivette, and Noemí. They were accused of providing material assistance to Nemesio and Abigael for their criminal operations. As a result, all of González Valencia's U.S.-based assets were frozen. The act also prohibited U.S. citizens from conducting business transactions with him.

== Arrest ==
Early in the morning on 2 January 2016, González Valencia and his companions left San Miguel el Alto, Jalisco after a meeting and stopped on the side road of a highway to go to the restroom. (Note: Another source states that González Valencia was leaving from a party.) After they exited their vehicle, a group of gunmen shot them from a moving vehicle. González Valencia was struck twice in the arm and had one bullet graze. (Note: Preliminary reports stated that González Valencia was involved in a car accident in Teocuitatlán, Jalisco.) He first visited a rural hospital near San Miguel el Alto to treat his gunshot wounds, but because the wounds were serious, he was taken to a private hospital in Zapopan, Jalisco. (Note: The name of the first hospital was San Miguel el Alto Regional Hospital. The private hospital in Zapopan is Real San José.)

At the hospital, he registered using fake identification; Mexican law required the hospital was report any gunshot wound so that the incident could be investigated. In this case, authorities suspected that the victim was not who he posed to be. The first officers to arrive were from the Federal Police and the Fuerza Única Jalisco, a branch of the state police. They kept González Valencia under custody to fully identify him, and safeguarded the premises to prevent his attackers from injuring him again or his comrades from orchestrating his escape. The Mexican Army later arrived to help safeguard the area.

On 3 January, the SEIDO, Mexico's anti-organized crime investigatory agency, confirmed his identity. His arrest was then confirmed by Jalisco state authorities, who told the press that González Valencia was under custody in the hospital and that he was a high-ranking member of the CJNG and Los Cuinis. They stated that once González Valencia was healed, he would be transferred to the SEIDO headquarters in Mexico City. Two days later, he was transferred from Jalisco to the SEIDO installations in Mexico City. (Note: Another source stated he was transferred first to a hospital in Mexico City.)

On 6 January, González Valencia was placed under a 40-day preventive detention due to his alleged involvement in criminal activities. The purpose of the preventive detention was to give investigators from the Federal Public Ministry more time to collect more evidences against González Valencia. His wife Adriana Sánchez Reyna tried to issue a writ of amparo in favor of her husband to prevent his detention. González Valencia was later imprisoned at the Federal Social Readaptation Center No. 1 (also known as "Altiplano"), Mexico's maximum-security prison in Almoloya de Juárez, State of Mexico.

== Release ==
On 23 December 2016, González Valencia's defense issued two writs of amparo to a State of Mexico court of appeals. The court struck the requests, stating that they were not able to notify González Valencia because he had no longer in prison since 14 December. He was released because a judge considered that there was not sufficient evidence to support the charges of organized crime and illicit enrichment.

== See also ==
- Mexican drug war

== Sources ==
Footnotes
