= Julio Alberto Castillo Rodríguez =

Suspected Mexican drug lord (born 1976)

- Born: 11 October 1976 (age 50); Apatzingán, Michoacán, Mexico
- Other name: El Chorro
- Employer: Jalisco New Generation Cartel (suspected)
- Criminal status: Fugitive
- Spouse: Jessica Johanna Oseguera González
- Relatives: Nemesio Oseguera Cervantes (father-in-law)

Julio Alberto Castillo Rodríguez (born 11 October 1976), also known by the aliases of “El Chorro” and “Ojo de Vidrio”, is a Mexican suspected drug lord and high-ranking leader of the Jalisco New Generation Cartel (CJNG), a criminal group based in Jalisco. He is the son-in-law of former CJNG leader Nemesio Oseguera Cervantes ("El Mencho"), and was reportedly responsible for managing money laundering schemes for the cartel.

In June 2015, he was arrested in Jalisco along with his brother-in-law Rubén Oseguera González ("El Menchito"), and imprisoned at the Federal Social Readaptation Center No. 1, before being released a month later for lack of evidence. Mexican federal authorities re-arrested him in April 2016 for his alleged involvement in the CJNG.

== Early life and career ==
Julio Alberto Castillo Rodríguez was born on 11 October 1976, in Apatzingán, Michoacán, Mexico. He is nicknamed "Ojo de Vidrio" (English: Glass Eye). He is married to Jessica Johanna Oseguera González, the oldest daughter of Nemesio Oseguera Cervantes. According to Mexican government sources, Castillo Rodríguez worked under Oseguera Cervantes as one of the CJNG's financial operators in the state of Jalisco. He also reportedly led a group of hitmen for the CJNG. Castillo Rodríguez has at least one sibling, Fernando Castillo Rodríguez ( "El Toro Valencia"), who reportedly worked for the CJNG.

On 27 October 2016, the United States Department of the Treasury's Office of Foreign Assets Control (OFAC) sanctioned Castillo Rodríguez under the Foreign Narcotics Kingpin Designation Act (also known as the "Kingpin Act") for his alleged involvement in money laundering and/or international drug trafficking. This sanction was a result of an investigation done by the OFAC and the Drug Enforcement Administration (DEA) office in Los Angeles in an attempt to disrupt the inner circle of the CJNG and affect their finances in Mexico's domestic economy. He was accused of providing material assistance to Nemesio and Abigael González Valencia ("El Cuini"), the then-leaders of the CJNG and Los Cuinis, respectively. (Note: Abigael González Valencia was arrested on 28 February 2015, in Puerto Vallarta, Jalisco.)

This sanction was also extended to eight more individuals: Antonio Oseguera Cervantes, businessman Fabián Felipe Vera López, attorney María Teresa Quintana Navarro, and five of González Valencia's siblings: Arnulfo, Édgar Edén, Marisa Ivette, and Noemí, and Elvis. As a result, all of their U.S.-based assets were frozen. The act also prohibited U.S. citizens from engaging in transactions with them.

== 2015 arrest ==
On 23 June 2015, Castillo Rodríguez was arrested by the Mexican Army and the Federal Police in the Lomas de Altamira neighborhood of Zapopan, Jalisco, along with his brother-in-law Rubén Oseguera González (alias "El Menchito"). The operation lasted about 20 minutes and no shots were fired. The officers entered the private neighborhood in several vehicles at around 2:15 am. CT and subdued the entrance guard. They then shot the security cameras with paintball guns to obscure them, destroyed several others, and asked the guard to cut the electricity power in the vicinity. As they were in the entrance booth of the neighborhood, the telephone rang but none of them answered. The guard was then asked to kneel down while the officers entered the neighborhood and apprehended Castillo Rodríguez, who was inside a vehicle with Oseguera González. Authorities confiscated several weapons, including 2 customized AR-15 assault rifles engraved with the insignias "CJNG 02 JR" and "Menchito".

Castillo Rodríguez had a pending order of appearance in court and there was an open investigation against him for kidnapping and organized crime involvement. Once in custody, he was taken to the SEIDO, Mexico's anti-organized crime investigatory agency, where he gave his statement and was interrogated by law enforcement. He was later transferred to the Federal Social Readaptation Center No. 1 (also known as "Altiplano"), a maximum-security prison in Almoloya de Juárez, State of Mexico, along with Oseguera González. Castillo Rodríguez was charged with using ammunition of exclusive military use, having five weapons of exclusive military use, carrying a firearm without a license, and organized crime involvement. (Note: A detainee in possession of at least five weapons of exclusive use from the Mexican Armed Forces is charged with acopio de armas.)

=== Release ===
On 1 July 2015, a federal judge from the State of Mexico ordered Castillo Rodríguez's release after concluding that the evidences against him were insufficient and that his due process was violated at the moment of his arrest and after he was in custody. The judge stated that when he was arrested in June, the officers did not have an arrest warrant against him and entered the private property without legal authorization. He also stated that the detainee was in custody for 9 hours and without a lawyer before he was sent to the justice department. When the judge considered that authorities had failed to prove that he was involved in organized crime, he was released from prison.

== 2016 arrest ==
Shortly before midday on 6 April 2016, Mexican federal authorities headed to Providencia neighborhood in Guadalajara, Jalisco, in several vehicles. When they arrived at the property they were looking to raid, they cordoned the area and entered the building through the front entrance while a helicopter flew over the vicinity. Neighbors stated that other federal agents surrounded the property through the rear and climbed the back walls from other properties. The helicopter then descended at the golf course of the Guadalajara Country Club, where three military vehicles later arrived.

At the scene, officials arrested Castillo Rodríguez and two of his companions, Édgar Ernesto Moreno Barragán and José Antonio Rodríguez Contreras. It was a joint arrest conducted by the Mexican Army, Navy, the Mexican National Security Commission and the Office of the General Prosecutor (PGR); no single shot was fired in the operation and authorities did not consider that the arrest created a risk situation. About 50 officers participated in the operation. Investigators seized four assault rifles, one which was equipped with a grenade launcher, and a rocket-propelled grenade (RPG) launcher, similar to the one the CJNG used to shoot down an Army helicopter in 2015. In a bulletin, the government stated that Castillo Rodríguez was responsible for coordinating money laundering schemes and other illegal activities for the CJNG, and that the arrest marked an important step in disrupting the financial, operational, and public relations structure of the criminal group.

After his capture, Mexican authorities patrolled several areas in the Guadalajara Metropolitan Area to prevent an aggressive response from the CJNG. The municipal police travelled in groups of three to five vehicles, while the Mexican National Gendarmerie and the military patrolled the streets with a helicopter as backup. Castillo Rodríguez and his two companions were then transferred to the SEIDO installations in Mexico City. The evidence seized at the scene was also transferred to Mexico City for the PGR to investigate.

=== Legal case ===
On 20 October 2016, Castillo Rodríguez's wife issued a writ of amparo to prevent her arrest and deposited $MXN24,000 in bond insurance. This request was submitted through an appeal court in Jalisco. She had previously issued another writ of amparo against the National Banking and Securities Commission after the PGR froze her bank accounts as part of an investigation. She owned a sushi restaurant chain in Guadalajara and Puerto Vallarta, a rental cabin business in Tapalpa, and a tequila company in Tepatitlán; (Note: Other sources state that the tequila company is based in Guadalajara and co-owned by a lady named Paloma Novoa Gómez.) investigators believed that she was laundering money for the CJNG through these businesses. Two months later, on 30 December 2016, an appeal court denied her writs of amparo.

=== Released ===
Subsequently, on April 6, 2016, now in Guadalajara, Jalisco, federal agents arrested Castillo Rodríguez as well as two of his companions (Édgar Ernesto Moreno Barragán and José Antonio Rodríguez Contreras), but he was again released months later.

== See also ==
- Mexican drug war

== Sources ==
Footnotes
