= Abigael González Valencia =

Mexican criminal (born 1972)

- Born: October 18, 1972 (age 53); Aguililla, Michoacán, Mexico
- Other name: El Cuini
- Employer(s): Los Cuinis; Jalisco New Generation Cartel
- Criminal status: Extradited to the United States
- Spouse: Jennifer Beaney Camacho Cázares
- Relatives: Nemesio Oseguera Cervantes (brother-in-law)

Abigael González Valencia (Spanish pronunciation: [aβiɣaˈel ɣonˈsales βaˈlensja]; born October 18, 1972), commonly referred to by his alias El Cuini (Spanish pronunciation: [el ˈkwini]), is a Mexican suspected drug lord and former leader of the Jalisco New Generation Cartel (CJNG), a criminal group based in Jalisco. He was also the head of Los Cuinis, an organization allied to the CJNG. Along with his brother-in-law Nemesio Oseguera Cervantes (alias "El Mencho"), one of Mexico's most-wanted men, González Valencia reportedly coordinated international drug trafficking operations in the Americas, Europe, and Asia. He was also responsible for managing the financial operations of the CJNG and Los Cuinis.

He worked for the Milenio Cartel in the 1990s, and eventually formed part of the original group that founded the CJNG and Los Cuinis in the 2010s. He was arrested on February 28, 2015, in Puerto Vallarta, Jalisco. On August 12, 2025, the Mexican government would extradite him to the U.S., where he is accused of drug trafficking and money laundering. Prior to González Valencia's arrest, Los Cuinis was regarded by government sources as one of Mexico's and the world's wealthiest drug trafficking organizations.

== Early life ==
Abigael González Valencia was born in Aguililla, Michoacán, Mexico on October 18, 1972. His parents were J. Abigael González Mendoza (father) and Estela Valencia Farías (mother). (Note: Other sources state that Estela Valencia Farías may be González Valencia's half sister. She was described as older than the rest of his siblings.) According to the United States Department of the Treasury, he has an alternative date of birth, October 28, 1979, and has alternative places of birth, Guadalajara, Jalisco, and Apatzingán, Michoacán. He has other legal names, including "Luis Ángel Gómez Flores", "Abigail González Valencia", "Luis Ángel González Valencia", "Jonathan Paul Tak Toledo", and "Paul Jonathan Tak Toledo". His last alternative legal name was the one he used for his Canadian passport, which he obtained through fraudulent methods.

According to the Mexican government, the González Valencia clan was made up of 18 siblings. The males are Abigael, José María, Arnulfo, Ulises Jovani, Elvis, Édgar Edén, Mauricio, Gerardo, José and Luis Ángel. (Note: Ulises Jovani is sometimes spelled as Ulises Giovanni.) The females are Rosalinda (also known as Rosalía), Noemí, Berenice, Marisa Ivette, María Elena, Érika and Abigaíl. People in their hometown nicknamed the clan "Cuinis" in reference to a squirrel (spermophilus adocetus) from the area that is known as "Cuinique". It is common for this squirrel to have over a dozen babies each time the mother gives birth.

In the 1980s, he immigrated illegally to the U.S. and settled in California, where he operated a drug distribution ring with Nemesio Oseguera Cervantes (alias "El Mencho"). He was working on the behalf of the Milenio Cartel, a criminal group from Jalisco that was originally formed by the Valencia clan. On May 2, 1996, González Valencia was arrested on drug charges in San Diego, California. He was charged with manufacturing, being in possession, and distributing methamphetamine and cocaine in Fresno and Madera, California. On November 22, 1996, however, the court approved a US$80,000 parole for González Valencia. He then reached an agreement with the court, where he declared himself guilty of the charges. On January 13, 1997, González Valencia was released after the fee was paid by four people who identified in court as Miguel Pimentel, Aída Pimentel, Edén Godínez, and María Odínez. The court ordered him to appear in court on April 28, but González Valencia fled to Mexico and joined organized crime.

== Rise to leadership ==
After returning to Mexico, González Valencia worked for the Milenio Cartel along with his brother-in-law Oseguera Cervantes. (Note: Oseguera Cervantes married González Valencia's sister Rosalinda. Their son is Rubén Oseguera González (alias "El Menchito"), another suspected CJNG leader.) González Valencia helped expand the criminal group's presence throughout the 1990s in several states across Mexico. In the early 2000s, however, the Gulf Cartel joined forces with La Familia Michoacana to fight the Milenio Cartel from its home turf, Michoacán. The violent conflict forced the Valencia clan to retreat to Jalisco, where they regrouped. In Jalisco, the Valencia family joined forces with a Sinaloa Cartel bloc headed by Ignacio "Nacho" Coronel, a high-ranking leader and ally of Joaquín "El Chapo" Guzmán, another Sinaloan drug lord. Under Coronel, González Valencia and Oseguera Cervantes held leadership positions and helped their criminal group expand to southeastern Mexico, particularly in the states of Chiapas, Campeche, and Yucatán.

On October 28, 2009, Óscar Orlando Nava Valencia (alias "El Lobo"), a high-ranking leader of the Milenio Cartel, was arrested. His brother Juan Carlos (alias "El Tigre") was arrested the following year on May 6, 2010. Two months later, Coronel was killed in a shootout with the Mexican Army. The leadership voids left from their arrests and/or deaths caused the Milenio Cartel to experience an internal power struggle as the remaining leaders tried to take control of the criminal group. As a result, the Milenio Cartel's divisions split into two. One side was known as La Resistencia; the other was Los Torcidos, which was headed by Oseguera Cervantes and González Valencia. A war broke out between both groups for the drug smuggling turfs in Jalisco and its surrounding states. Los Torcidos eventually won the war and consolidated their influence in western Mexico. The group then changed its name to the Jalisco New Generation Cartel (Spanish: Cártel de Jalisco Nueva Generación, or CJNG).

== Leadership tenure ==
When the Milenio Cartel ruptured in the 2010s, González Valencia created the group known as Los Cuinis. It went from a small criminal group to one of Mexico's leading criminal organizations, partly due to its relationship with the CJNG and Oseguera Cervantes. The exact role of Los Cuinis in Mexico's organized crime landscape is not completely understood, however. According to the Department of the Treasury, Los Cuinis is an independent criminal organization and does not form part of the CJNG's subgroups. They alleged that it maintains a close relationship with the CJNG because of González Valencia's family line with Oseguera Cervantes. The U.S. government alleged that both González Valencia and Oseguera Cervantes worked together in international drug trafficking operations.

On the other hand, several Mexican sources stated that Los Cuinis acted as a financial and money laundering bloc under the CJNG. (Note: Under Mexican law, operaciones de recursos de procedencia ilícita is also known as lavado de dinero (money laundering).) When he was arrested, sources identified González Valencia as a "plaza boss" (regional leader) of the CJNG and top financial operator. One source, citing intelligence reports from the government, stated in 2014 that most accounts consider Oseguera Cervantes the leader of the CJNG. However, it alleged that the CJNG was actually controlled by Los Cuinis and the Valencia clan, specifically González Valencia. The source also stated that Los Cuinis has an armed branch known as Los Viagras, made up of former members of the Knights Templar Cartel. Another Mexican source stated that González Valencia was the principal operator of the CJNG and that Oseguera Cervantes was his deputy despite the generally accepted notion of Oseguera Cervantes being the top leader of the CJNG.

González Valencia was able to make the CJNG and Los Cuinis one of Mexico's most profitable organized crime groups. The government estimates that the CJNG has about US$50 billion in total assets. González Valencia was successful in establishing a market share in European and Asian drug markets by forging alliances with foreign traffickers, instead of solely focusing on importing narcotics in the U.S. drug market. He acknowledged that importing drugs to the U.S. meant competing with rival criminal groups in Mexico violently. He also established relationships with Colombian, Ecuadorian, and Peruvian drug groups and guerrillas, particularly the Revolutionary Armed Forces of Colombia (FARC), to provide him with cocaine and assist him in his endeavors overseas.

In 2015, a high-profile anonymous official in the Drug Enforcement Administration (DEA) spoke to a Mexican investigative newspaper on the role of Los Cuinis in the international market. The source stated that Los Cuinis was the richest drug trafficking organization in the world. This statement countered the widely perceived notion of the Sinaloa Cartel being the most profitable organized crime from Mexico in terms of net profit. (Note: In terms of manpower and influence, the source stated that the Sinaloa Cartel continued to have that advantage over Los Cuinis and the CJNG.) The source attributed Los Cuinis' success to their control of the cocaine and methamphetamine trade in Europe and Asia, since foreign authorities encountered difficulties in stopping the flow of narcotics or seizing the drug proceeds that the Valencia clan receives from the importations. The source also stated that it is difficult to infiltrate the inner circles of Los Cuinis through undercover informants because the Valencia clan is wary of outsiders.

== Arrest ==
On February 28, 2015, González Valencia was arrested in a restaurant in Puerto Vallarta, Jalisco, following a joint operation led by the Federal Police, the National Security Commission (CNS), and the Office of the General Prosecutor (PGR). He was arrested with four other people: a Mexican, two Colombians, and a Venezuelan. The arrest was a result of an intensive investigation by the SEIDO, Mexico's anti-organized crime investigatory agency. Prior to his arrest, the investigation led a Mexican court to issue a subpoena, an order that asked for González Valencia to appear in court to testify against the accusations. He was accused of being a financial operator for the CJNG in Jalisco, managing international drug trafficking shipments to the U.S., and overseeing arms trafficking to Mexico from the U.S. At the scene, investigators seized a grenade, a package with about 1 kg (2.2 lbs) of cocaine, several cellphones, a vehicle, and fake IDs. According to a CNS report, González Valencia offered law enforcement MXN$50 million to not appear on television or have pictures of him released to the press, but his offer was turned down.

== Criminal charges ==
In the 2000s, the DEA office in Los Angeles, California, began to investigate González Valencia and Oseguera Cervantes for their alleged involvement in international drug trafficking through the CJNG and Los Cuinis. In 2000, investigators discovered that González Valencia was reportedly involved in a US$10 million cocaine, marijuana, methamphetamine operation. Five years later, he was accused of using firearms in one or more occasions to facilitate his smuggling operations. In 2007, the DEA discovered that González Valencia was involved in another international smuggling operations that imported at least 5 kg (11 lb) of cocaine into the U.S. from Colombia, Guatemala, and Mexico. That same year, González Valencia allegedly coordinated a second cocaine shipment from Ecuador to the U.S. that was imported through Mexican territory. In 2009, the DEA discovered again that González Valencia imported at least 5 kg (11 lb) of cocaine to the U.S. via Ecuador and Mexico.

In 2013, he was allegedly involved in two methamphetamine and cocaine shipments respectively from Mexico to the U.S. The following year, however, DEA investigators noticed a radical shift in the modus operandi of the CJNG and Los Cuinis; they discovered that González Valencia was responsible for coordinating a drug smuggling operation from overseas. The methamphetamine operations extended from Mexico, Australia, and the U.S. This overseas operation was facilitated by González Valencia's relationship with Chinese gangs that helped introduce the shipment to Oceania. In March 2014, the United States District Court for the District of Columbia indicted González Valencia through a federal grand jury. The investigation was carried out by the DEA office in Los Angeles. He was charged with a number of crimes, including his alleged participation in leading a Continuing Criminal Enterprise.

=== Kingpin Act ===
On April 8, 2015, González Valencia was sanctioned under the Foreign Narcotics Kingpin Designation Act (also known as the "Kingpin Act"), for his role in international drug trafficking. As a result, all of his U.S.-based assets, of CJNG and Los Cuinis, or of U.S-based people associated to him or his criminal group, were frozen. The act also prohibited U.S. citizens from engaging in transactions with him. The DEA office in Los Angeles stated that this measure was done as a result of the rapid expansion of the CJNG and Los Cuinis, which had grown to become one of Mexico's leading criminal groups through wealth, drug trafficking, violence, and corruption.

On August 19, 2015, the Department of the Treasury sanctioned 15 businesses in Mexico and 6 Mexican nationals under González Valencia through the Kingpin Act. Among the businesses sanctions was Hotelito Desconocido, a luxurious resort in Tomatlán, Jalisco, real estate companies in Guadalajara and Zapopan, and shopping centers in Zapopan and Playa del Carmen, Quintana Roo. The individuals sanctions were González Valencia, his wife Jennifer Beaney Camacho Cázares, suspected money launderers Fernando Torres González, María Elena Márquez Gallegos, Silvia Romina Sánchez Carlán, Diana María Sánchez Carlón, and Wendy Dalaithy Amaral Arévalo (married to González Valencia's brother Gerardo). In December 2015, the Department of the Treasury sanctioned another close associate of González Valencia, Naim Libien Tella, along with 4 other business entities. The companies sanctioned were the Mexico City newspaper Unomásuno, another daily newspaper based in Toluca, an investment firm in Guadalajara, and an air taxi company. These companies are money laundering fronts and are owned by González Valencia and/or Libien Tella. (Note: Naim Libien Tella was arrested in Azcapotzalco, Mexico City, on September 2, 2016, for tax evasion charges.)

On April 4, 2016, the Department of the Treasury sanctioned 7 companies linked to González Valencia through the Kingpin Act in an attempt to disrupt Los Cuinis' business network. Their companies were alleged to be owned or controlled by González Valencia, Jeniffer Beaney Camacho Cázares, Fernando Torres González, Silvia Romina Sánchez Carlán, and/or Diana María Sánchez Carlón. These individuals had been sanctioned the year before for managing over businesses owned by González Valencia. Four of the companies were agricultural firms in the Guadalajara Metropolitan Area, one was a tourism agency headquartered in Mexico City, and one was a biomedical technology consulting firm in Guadalajara.

On October 27, 2016, the Department of the Treasury sanctioned 9 more individuals linked to the CJNG and Los Cuinis through the Kingpin Act. According to the report, the individuals were sanctioned because they provided material assistance to González Valencia for his drug trafficking operations. The individuals were Antonio Oseguera Cervantes, Julio Alberto Castillo Rodríguez, businessman Fabián Felipe Vera López, attorney María Teresa Quintana Navarro, and five of González Valencia's siblings: Arnulfo, Édgar Edén, Elvis, Marisa Ivette, and Noemí. This sanction against González Valencia's family members was an attempt by the U.S. government to disrupt his inner circle.

On April 20, 2017, the Department of the Treasury sanctioned two companies linked to González Valencia that operated as property managers for two shopping centers in Zapopan and Playa del Carmen that were sanctioned in 2015. According to investigators, the two shopping centers were previously managed by two other property management firms that were sanctioned by the OFAC that same year as well. They believe that the González Valencia created these two new property management firms to circumvent the sanctions imposed and conceal their money laundering interests.

On September 14, 2017, the Department of the Treasury sanctioned four Mexican companies and three people linked to González Valencia, Los Cuinis, and the CJNG. The first entity was a business tied to a sushi restaurant in Guadalajara. The sushi restaurant was a successor entity to another sushi restaurant that was sanctioned by the OFAC in September 2015 for being a front for the CJNG. The owners of the entity tied to the successor sushi restaurant were Alfonso Corona Romero (alias "Chef Poncho Corona") and Édgar Alfonso Corona Robles (alias "Ponchito Corona"), father and son. Both of them were sanctioned and accused of being front persons for Los Cuinis and the CJNG. Other business entities sanctioned were two cake businesses in Guadalajara; these shop were co-located in the same shopping center that was sanctioned by the OFAC in August 2015. González Valencia's wife manages Camacho Cázares the first cake shop along with Salime Abouzaid El Bayeh. Abouzaid El Bayeh worked at the first sushi restaurant, was involved with Unomásuno, and owns a Guadalajara pharmaceutical distributor and the two cake shops.

== Imprisonment ==
On March 3, 2015, federal judge Vicente Antonio Bermúdez Zacarías approved González Valencia's 40-day preventative detention. (Note: Bermúdez Zacarías was killed on October 17, 2016, in Metepec, State of Mexico, by a gunman who shot him in the back and head.) On April 12, the detention time ran out and the PGR transferred him to the Federal Social Readaptation Center No. 1 (also known as "Altiplano"), a maximum-security prison in Almoloya de Juárez, State of Mexico. The PGR confirmed that they were working with a State of Mexico court to formalize an extradition process and send González Valencia to the U.S., where he is wanted for drug trafficking. González Valencia was kept in prison under a temporary status and was not charged with crimes in Mexico because the PGR wanted to extradite him quickly.

On June 4, 2018, federal judge Juan Mateo Brieba de Castro from State of Mexico rejected a motion to move González Valencia from Altiplano to another prison in Mexico. The request to move him to another jail was done by a prison administration committee, but González Valencia appealed the move and had it approved by a court under the rationale that the move put his personal integrity at risk. In addition to the prison transfer, the court agreed to review the motion he made against his possible extradition to the U.S.

On August 29, this motion was ignored and he was transferred to the Federal Social Readaptation Center No. 14 (also known as "CPS Durango"), a maximum-security prison in Gómez Palacio, Durango. Valencia complained about the transfer and stated that the prison was not giving him adequate healthcare conditions and was keeping him segregated from the rest of the prison population. He asked a court to transfer him back to Altiplano because he stated that he feared for his life. His defense explained that most of the convicts in CPS Durango were charged with kidnapping, a high-impact crime in Mexico.

On February 15, 2019, González Valencia was transferred to Reclusorio Norte, a penitentiary in Mexico City. His transfer caused tensions after several prison guards complained to their management about receiving death threats and seeing vehicles with gunmen outside the prison. The guards asked their management to change the area of the prison their work in and their work schedules. Under fears of a prison escape, authorities transferred González Valencia back to Altiplano on July 27. A week earlier, a video circulated on social media that the CJNG was planning to help González Valencia escape from prison. González Valencia's defense stated that authorities violated a writ of amparo he issued days earlier, which prevented González Valencia from being transferred from Reclusorio Norte.

== Extradition process ==
=== Approval process ===
On April 16, 2015, González Valencia's defense issued a writ of amparo to prevent the speedy extradition of their client. A judge agreed to shut down the possibility for a speedy extradition and granted González Valencia the opportunity to have an extradition trial. On October 11, a federal court in Mexico City stated González Valencia was to be extradited, but left it up to Mexico's Secretariat of Foreign Affairs (SRE). On December 21, 2016, González Valencia was approved for extradition, but his defense issued another writ of amparo. On March 14, 2017, SRE issued a communiqué where it approved the extradition, but cited that they would have to wait until the writ of amparo case was solved to extradite him.

On January 19, 2019, a tribunal court approved González Valencia's writ of amparo from December 2016, effectively stopping any extradition efforts against him. In order to extradite him to the U.S., the plaintiff would have to issue a new request and have it be validated by the court. The court made this decision because the SRE did not mention the charges González Valencia was facing in Mexico in the extradition request, and was told that if they were to request a new process, they would have to include the charges in Mexico. The court also asked the SRE to analyze the charges he faces in Mexico and decide upon that if an extradition to the U.S. was required. His defense had argued that authorities violated the legal rights of González Valencia and that his extradition to the U.S. was unconstitutional, but the court stated the previous extradition requests did not violate his rights and were constitutional.

=== Extradition ===
On August 12, 2025, González Valencia was extradited to the United States.

== See also ==
- Mexican drug war
