= Rosalinda González Valencia =

Mexican businesswoman and cartel member

- Born: 1962 or 1963 (age 63–64); Aguililla, Michoacán, Mexico
- Other name: La Jefa (English: The Boss)
- Occupations: Businesswoman, money launderer
- Employer: Jalisco New Generation Cartel (suspected)
- Criminal charge: Money laundering
- Criminal status: Released from prison, awaiting trial
- Spouse(s): Armando Valencia Cornelio (divorced) El Mencho (m. 1996; died 2026) (Note: According to Sedena, Rosalinda and El Mencho had been separated since 26 May 2018 and that in a relationship with a woman named Guadalupe Moreno Carrillo since that time. In spite of this, Rosalinda and El Mencho still remain married as of January 2025)
- Children: El Menchito; Juan Carlos Valencia González; Jessica Johanna Oseguera González; Laisha Michelle Oseguera González
- Relatives: Armando Valencia Cornelio (uncle, in addition to being former husband)

Rosalinda González Valencia (Spanish pronunciation: [rosaˈlinda ɣonˈsales βaˈlensja]; born 1963) is a Mexican businesswoman and convicted money launderer of the Jalisco New Generation Cartel (CJNG), a criminal group based in Jalisco. She has also been known by her alias "La Jefa" (The Boss). She was married to El Mencho, once one of Mexico's most-wanted criminals.

Born in rural Michoacán, Rosalinda grew up in a family of 18 siblings and was the eldest of her sisters. Her family originally grew avocados, but eventually turned to cultivating marijuana and opium poppy. In the 1970s, her family formed the Milenio Cartel, the predecessor group of the CJNG, and began trafficking narcotics from Mexico to the United States.

According to Mexico's Secretariat of the Interior, González oversaw the CJNG's financial and legal resources, including over 70 businesses affiliated with the criminal group. Some of them were sanctioned under the Foreign Narcotics Kingpin Designation Act. González's defense claims she is not guilty and was a victim of defamation due to her relationship with El Mencho. On 26 May 2018, González was arrested by the Mexican Navy in Zapopan, Jalisco, for her alleged involvement in money laundering. After three months of hearings and legal battles, a judge granted her release from prison after she paid an MXN$1.5 million bail. González's trial was held behind closed doors. On 15 November 2021, González was recaptured. In December 2023, she was sentenced to five years in prison for failing to disclose transactions related to a car wash she ran. She was given an early release from prison, in February 2025. At the time of El Mencho's death in February 2026, it was reported that his influence in the CJNG initially came through his marriage to Valencia. It was later reported that Juan Carlos Valencia González, who is Rosalinda's son from a previous relationship, became the new head of the CJNG following El Mencho's death.

== Early life ==
Rosalinda González Valencia was born in El Naranjo, a rural community in Aguililla, Michoacán, Mexico, in 1964 or 1965. (Note: Her approximate year of birth was calculated based on her age (55) on 28 May 2018.) Her father was J. Abigael González Mendoza and her mother was Estela Valencia Farías. (Note: Other sources state that Estela Valencia Farías may be González Valencia's half sister. She was described as older than the rest of his siblings.) According to the Mexican government, Rosalinda's family includes at least 18 siblings. The males were Abigael, José María, Arnulfo, Ulises Jovani, Elvis, Édgar Edén, Mauricio, Gerardo, José and Luis Ángel. (Note: Ulises Jovani is sometimes spelled as Ulises Giovanni.) The females were Rosalinda (also known as Rosalía), Noemí, Berenice, Marisa Ivette, María Elena, Érika and Abigaíl. Rosalinda was the eldest of the sisters. People in their hometown nicknamed the clan "Cuinis" in reference to a squirrel (spermophilus adocetus) from the area that is known as "Cuinique". It is common for this squirrel to have over a dozen babies each time the mother gives birth.

When González was young, her family was poor and grew avocados for a living in a plantation field they owned in Michoacán. By the 1970s, however, the family began cultivating and trafficking marijuana and opium poppy from Mexico to the United States. González's economic status improved when her siblings emigrated to the U.S. in the 1980s and got involved in the drug trade in California. González would manage to migrate to the United States as well. Her siblings worked for the Milenio Cartel, a criminal group from Michoacán that was formed several members of González's family; their main leader was Armando Valencia Cornelio ("El Maradona" and/or "El Juanito"), who was responsible for large shipments of narcotics to the U.S. from the Mexican states of Michoacán and Jalisco. (Note: He was arrested by security forces in 2003 in Guadalajara, Jalisco, and was convicted and sentenced to 47 years in prison for drug trafficking in 2010. He would be released from prison early in 2020, but was by that point in time confirmed to be sufferring from cancer. By March 2026, he was still described as having only been a leader in the Milenio Cartel. His "lucrative relationship" with drug trafficking is also acknowledged to have ended with his 2003 arrest.) Though few details are known of her personal life, security forces believe that González was married to Armando. In November 2021, it was reported that she was in fact also the niece of Armando. In spite of this, Armando was also acknowledged to be only "somewhat older" than Rosalinda, having been born in 1959. They would have at least one child together: Juan Carlos Valencia González. Armando and González eventually separated in the 1990s, and she began dating Nemesio Oseguera Cervantes ("El Mencho").

El Mencho was a close associate of his siblings and grew up in the same rural community as González's. He worked as a guard for the clan's marijuana plantations and eventually joined González's siblings in the drug trade in the U.S. (Note: Another source stated that El Mencho worked as a guard for the marijuana plantations of Manuel Salcido Uzeta (alias "El Cochiloco") and met González's family during that job.) After Oseguera was deported to Mexico, he joined a local police force and married González in 1996. Their matrimony helped strengthen Oseguera's relationship with González's clan. They had three children: Laisha, Jessica Johana, and Rubén Oseguera González ("El Menchito"). Oseguera was one of the founders of the Jalisco New Generation Cartel (CJNG), a criminal group that sprung in the 2010s after the Milenio Cartel splintered. In the 2000s, several of González's family members were arrested by security forces, which splintered the Milenio Cartel into two factions, Los Torcidos and La Resistencia. Los Torcidos was headed by Oseguera and several of González's family members, and they eventually consolidated their influence after defeating La Resistencia. After Joaquín "El Chapo" Guzmán was extradited to the U.S. in 2017, Oseguera became Mexico's most-wanted man.

== Career ==
According to Mexico's Secretariat of the Interior (SEGOB), a branch of the federal government, González was responsible for overseeing the CJNG's financial and legal resources. Her role was to reportedly manage multiple CJNG-affiliated business and oversee fines and taxes owed by these firms. Within the CJNG, González was reportedly referred to by her alias La Jefa (English: The Boss). Authorities suspect she took over these activities after the arrest of her brother Abigael on 28 February 2015. With Abigael behind bars, the government began a crackdown on Los Cuinis, the name of the clan's group, and was successful at arresting or charging several of González's siblings. Following the arrests of González's brothers, Los Cuinis, which previously served as a sister organization to the CJNG, ceased to exist as a separate cartel and came into the fold of the CJNG. It also played a vital role in the CJNG's rise as a prominent drug cartel.

According to the U.S. Department of the Treasury, Justice, and State, Los Cuinis is the financial bloc of the CJNG and is made up of members of González's clan, with Abigael as its main figurehead. Both the CJNG and Los Cuinis are intertwined through drug trafficking activities, money laundering networks, and familial ties. They have dealings in multiple parts of the world, including the United States, Latin America, Africa, Europe, and Asia.

Since 2015, authorities suspected that González headed a network of over 70 businesses affiliated with the CJNG. They stated that González was responsible for laundering over MXN$1 billion (over US$50 million) between 2015 and 2016. Her suspected role within the CJNG was similar to those of the other women within her immediate and extended family. Her sisters María Ivette and Noemí, in addition to Jennifer Beaney Camacho Cázares, the wife of her brother Abigael, and Wendy Delaithy Amaral Arévalo, wife of her brother Gerardo, were also suspected of money laundering for their alleged role in heading multiple businesses owned by the CJNG. Among the businesses they owned included companies in the following industries: healthcare, tourism, hospitality, retail, consulting, agriculture, advertising, real estate, and international trade.

From 8 April 2015 to 12 February 2018, González and her daughter Jessica Johana issued six writs of amparo in courts based in Jalisco and Mexico City to prevent law enforcement from arresting them. González began this legal procedure because she feared for their arrest and suspected authorities were looking to apprehend them. This suspicion began on 8 April 2015, when Oseguera and Abigael were sanctioned by the U.S. Department of the Treasury's Office of Foreign Assets Control under the Foreign Narcotics Kingpin Designation Act ("Kingpin Act"). Over the years leading to 2018, González's siblings and in-laws were also sanctioned under the Kingpin Act for their alleged involvement in the CJNG. (Note: González is not sanctioned under the Kingpin Act. However, she was inadvertently cited as being sanctioned by some media outlets.) However, her writs of amparos were denied by the courts, which cited that there were no active arrests warrants against her in Mexico.

At the time of his death, El Mencho, who separated from Valencia in 2018, was reported to now have another romantic partner. However, her son Juan Carlos Valencia Gonzalez, who was reported to be El Mencho's "stepson," was still regarded as El Mencho's "de facto second in command" by the Director of National Intelligence's (DNI) National Counterterrorism Center.

== Arrest and imprisonment ==
On the evening of 26 May 2018, González was arrested by the Mexican Navy outside a 7-Eleven convenience store in Puerta de Hierro, an upscale neighborhood in Zapopan, Jalisco. She was living in Torre Aura Altitude (es), a luxurious 171.6 m (563 ft) tall residential building, (Note: González owned one apartment in Torre Aura Altitude; the cost for one was around MXN$11 million (approximately US$550,000 in September 2018).) close to where she was arrested. Authorities filmed a video showing the moment when González was apprehended; when authorities approached her, they asked for her name, to which she responded positively. They then asked for her daughter Jessica, and González confirmed she was not with her. Authorities then proceeded to apprehend her, and told her about the arrest warrant and the money laundering and organized crime charges against her. González was told to give her car keys to the friend that was with her, and was told by her detainers that she would be taken to Mexico's Office of the General Prosecutor (PGR). González's companion said she would go with them, and González asked her to call her lawyer.

Upon her arrest, she was transported to the Estadio Akron, a multipurpose stadium in Zapopan, and taken via helicopter to Mexico City. Once in Mexico City, she was taken to the offices of the Assistant Attorney General's Office for Special Investigations on Organized Crime (SEIDO), Mexico's organized crime investigatory agency, for her legal declaration. On 28 May, González was imprisoned at the Federal Social Readaptation No. 16, a female maximum-security prison in Coatlán del Río, Morelos. A large security surveillance measure was erected at the prison when González was taken there. Mexico's National Human Rights Commission (CNDH) stated that the prison had multiple deficiencies, including insufficient number of personnel, lack of adequate healthcare, personnel oversight, prisoner activities and rehabilitation, and inmate categorization.

On 29 May, a court granted González a writ of amparo and allowed her to communicate with her defense. González issued this because she claimed that the PGR was not allowing her to speak with her defense and was violating Article 14, Article 16, and Article 22 of the Constitution of Mexico, which cites violations of due process, law arrest, and cruel and unusual punishment as unconstitutional. On 31 May, a court from the Federal Social Readaptation Center No. 1 (also known as "Altiplano"), a maximum-security prison in the Almoloya de Juárez, State of Mexico, confirmed that González's first case hearing would be held there the next day, and that she would be transferred from Morelos to attend it.

=== Background and reactions ===
On 27 May 2018, SEGOB's head Alfonso Navarrete Prida confirmed González's arrest in a press conference. He stated that the operation that led to her arrest was part of a law enforcement-led campaign known as Operation Escudo Titán, which was launched on 28 January 2018 to combat organized crime. The operation that led to González's arrest was specifically led by Mexico's National Security Commission (CNS) (es), the Mexican Federal Police, and other law enforcement institutions. During the press conference, Navarrete Prida highlighted the fact that the arrest was not conducted in flagrante delicto, but rather was part of an in-depth investigation and had the support of the court. Authorities confirmed that they had increase the presence of security forces in Jalisco on 21 May, when affiliates of the CJNG attempted to murder Luis Carlos Nájera Gutiérrez de Velasco, Jalisco's Secretary of Labor and former State Attorney General. He survived with non-threatening injuries, but multiple civilians were wounded and one eight-month-old baby was killed. Shootouts and roadblocks broke out in Guadalajara that day.

Authorities also confirmed that the arrest occurred without a single shot fired, and that she was suspected of heading the CJNG's financials. Navarrete Prida stated that González had an arrest warrant for money laundering and organized crime involvement charges, but that she was not part of Mexico's 122 most-wanted people, a list that was created in the administration of President Enrique Peña Nieto (2012–2018). Along with González, authorities also confirmed the arrest of Gerardo Botello Rosales ("El Cachas"), a suspected high-ranking member of the CJNG. Navarrete Prida did not confirm if security forces were close to arresting Oseguera when González was apprehended. (Note: He clarified that security forces have been close to arresting him in previous operations. "I once heard that they arrived at a place and that he had just left because the coffee was still steaming", he said.)

The Government of Jalisco raised their security measures across Jalisco the following morning as a preventative measure for González's arrest. They worked together with municipal and federal forces to prevent a response from the CJNG. However, Governor Aristóteles Sandoval discarded that the measures were part of the state's "red code" alert, a designation used to warn citizens of risk situations across the state. This is the highest level in the alert system and is used when the state is considered to be under great danger. Rumors had surfaced earlier that day among the local press that the governor had ordered the activation of the red code alert. However, as precaution updates and rumors spread on social media among the citizens of Jalisco, the governor stepped in to clarify no alert had been issued, and asked citizens to not spread rumors on social media.

== Trial ==
On 1 June 2018, González's hearing was held in private after her lawyers and the government mutually agreed to it. The plaintiff asked the judge to hold the hearing behind closed doors because much of the evidence they were presenting that day against González was also being used against the CJNG in other investigations, and they said they did not want for it to be released to the public. González stated she feared for her physical integrity and did not want the press during the hearing. When asked why she feared for her life, González explained that the media was negatively portraying her and claiming she was a criminal. "Yes, your honor ... I am not a criminal, I've been defamed", she told the judge in her defense. The judge granted this decision and ordered journalists and her family out of the court. The hearing began at 1 p.m. and lasted for approximately twelve hours. (Note: The trial started 14 minutes passed the scheduled time due to logistical delays caused by the plaintiff.) During the hearing, the judge considered that the evidences provided by the plaintiff accusing González of money laundering were sufficient. Her organized crime involvement charge was dropped after the judge did not consider that the evidences presented were strong enough to link her directly with the CJNG.

Specifically, the plaintiff cited a company that González reportedly managed on the CJNG's behalf, (Note: According to Mexico's Public Registry of Commerce (RPC) (es), González was managing partner of JJGON, S.P.R. DE R.L. DE C.V. along with her daughter Jessica Johanna.) JJGON, S.P.R. DE R.L. DE C.V., as evidence of her link to the criminal group. (Note: On 17 September 2015, the U.S. Department of the Treasury's Office of Foreign Assets Control sanctioned JJGON, S.P.R. DE R.L. DE C.V. under the Foreign Narcotics Kingpin Designation Act. The report stated it was an agricultural company based in Guadalajara, Jalisco, and linked to the CJNG suspected leaders Nemesio Oseguera Cervantes and Abigael González Valencia.) They also cited over 70 firms reportedly owned by the CJNG that González was accused of managing. Some of these businesses were sanctioned under the Kingpin Act. The plaintiff stated she made over MXN$1 billion (over US$50 million) from these firms between 2015 and 2016. Her defense tried to discredit this claim, but the judge stated that he was convinced González received illegal funds from the CJNG to purchase and liquidate assets on their behalf. The money made from these investments was then believed to be transferred by González to private bank accounts owned by the CJNG. As this decision was finalized, the judge ordered González back to Morelos' prison under pre-trial detention status. He stated that González was considered a flight risk if granted bail.

González's defense issued two writs of amparos after her first hearing to request her release from prison. On 6 June 2018, a federal judge in Mexico City rejected one of them that attempted to revert her detention status. The second request was issued to ask for her release from prison on bail; the defense cited that money laundering was not a "serious crime" under Mexican federal law, and that she should be allowed to be released while the trial continues. (Note: Her previous organized crime involvement charge, which was dropped during her first hearing, was considered "serious crime" under Mexican federal law.) On 6 September 2018, this request was granted by a federal judge. González was released from prison after paying around MXN$1.5 million in bail (approximately US$78,000). The case tilted in her favor because a judge considered that González's sentimental ties with Oseguera were not evidence of wrongdoing, and because she was not legally obligated to know the origins of her husband's funds.

On 27 October 2018, her defense issued a writ of amparo asking an appeals court to notify them if the PGR had opened new investigations against her since she was released from prison on bail. This request was previously issued by her defense on 26 July, and admitted into court on 5 November. An appeals court initially rejected González's motion, but a tribunal ordered the judge to reconsider the request.

== Second arrest ==
On 15 November 2021, members of the Mexican military arrested González in the Zapopan municipality in Jalisco. At the time of this arrest, González was found to be chief of the CJNG's financial operations. The Mexican Ministry of Defense released a statement which described her arrest as "a significant blow to the financial structure of organized crime in the state." At this time, her five brothers and two of her children were still incarcerated. With so many family members arrested, González was also regarded as one of the last links in the CJNG-Los Cuinis alliance.

== Car wash transaction conviction ==
On 17 December 2023, González received a five-year sentence after being convicted for failing to disclose transactions of a car wash she owned in Puerto Vallarta, Jalisco. Her lawyer contended that the conviction was not related to the money laundering allegations that she was charged with and planned to appeal the verdict.

== Health and terminal illness ==
After her arrest in 2021, numerous rumors began to emerge about her declining health. In August 2023, Spanish newspaper La Vanguardia revealed that in addition to dealing with hypertension, González's health condition is considered extremely delicate and serious, and that she had an undisclosed terminal illness. Her defense made a request to the justice of the State of Morelos for her to receive treatment for the numerous illnesses she was facing, which was accepted.

== 2025 release from prison ==
On 29 January 2025, she was granted an early release from prison for good conduct, after she served more than half her sentence. On 27 February 2025, Rosalinda González Valencia was released from the Federal Center for Social Readaptation for Women in Coatlán del Río, Morelos.

== Influence and ascension of son as head of CJNG ==
Despite serving as head of the CJNG, El Mencho's influence was acknowledged by February 2026 to have greatly aided through his marriage to González. Through González, the niece of Milenio Cartel founder Armando Valencia Cornelio, alias "El Maradona," El Mencho was able to recruit numerous former Mileno Cartel members into the CJNG. Though "El Maradona" would be imprisoned in 2003, and would never manage to resume his "lucrative relationship" with drug trafficking, the Valencia clan would still hold some prominence in drug trafficking, with El Mencho's main connection to Mileno Cartel members, some of whom would later create the CJNG's vital Los Cuinis fraction, still coming through his marriage to González.

On 18 March 2026, the Wall Street Journal reported that González's son from her first marriage, Juan Carlos Valencia González, also identified by his aliases "El Tricky Tres," "El Pelón," "03," "El 3," and "Pelacas," was now the CJNG's new leader. On 6 April 2026, El Pais also confirmed this, further noting how Juan's status as not only El Mencho's stepson, but also the he gained through Rosalinda and her family benefited him in working his way through the leadership vacuum which was created through El Mencho's death in February 2026.

== See also ==
- Mexican drug war
