= Tapalpa =

Municipality in the state of Jalisco, Mexico

- Municipality and town
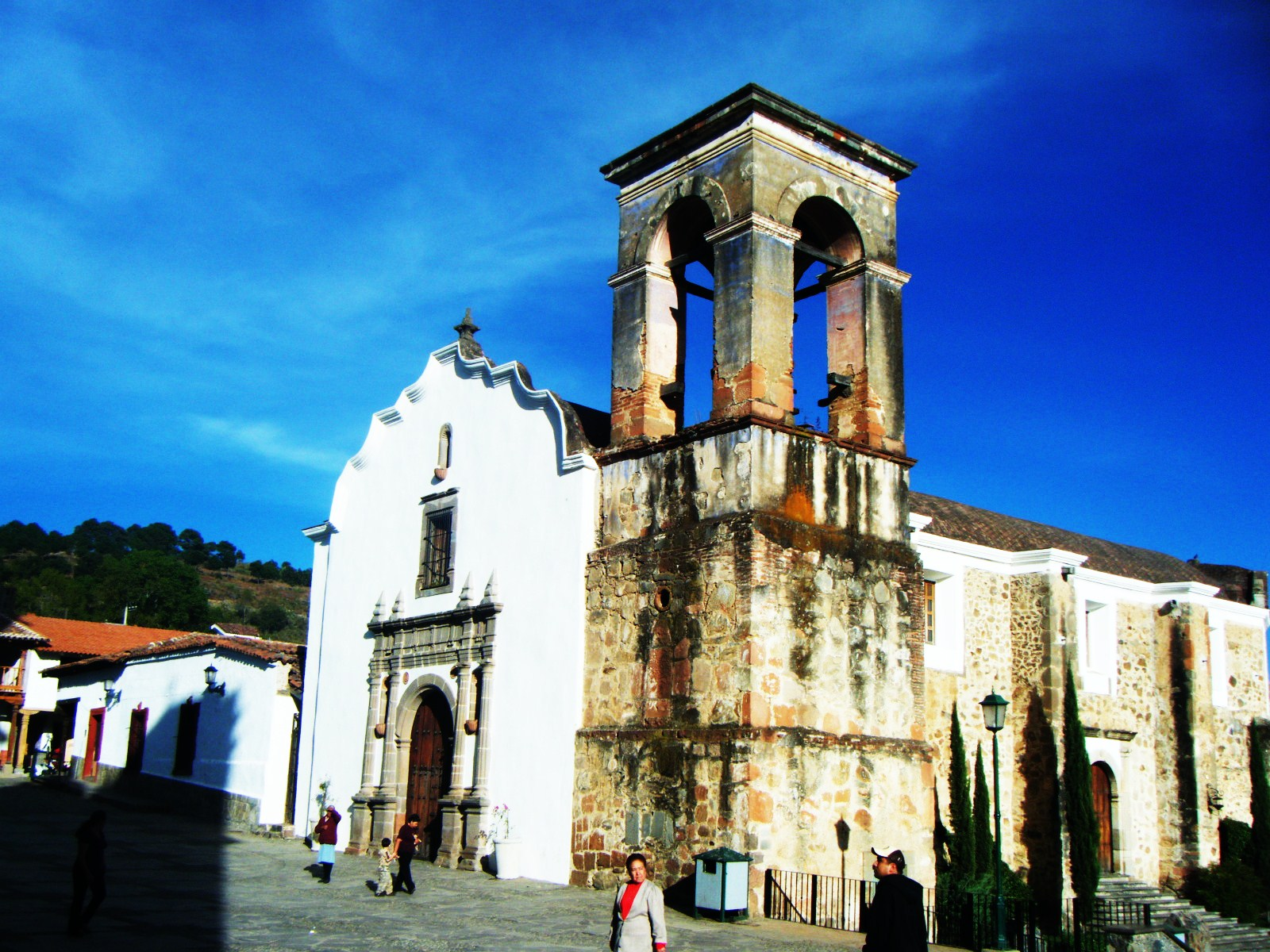
- Colonial era church in Tapalpa.

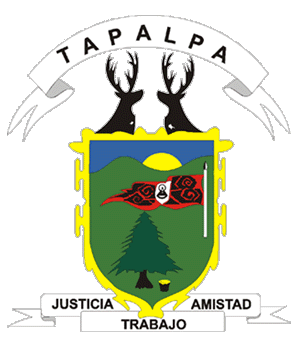
- Coat of arms

- Location of the municipality in Jalisco

- Location in Jalisco Location in Mexico
- Coordinates: 19.945°N 103.7578°W
- Country: Mexico
- State: Jalisco
- Town: 1825
- Municipality: 1869

Area
  - Total: 619.4 km^{2} (239.2 sq mi)
  - Town: 3.67 km^{2} (1.42 sq mi)

Population (2020 census)
  - Total: 21,245
  - Density: 34.30/km^{2} (88.83/sq mi)
  - Town: 5,955
  - Town density: 1,620/km^{2} (4,200/sq mi)
- Time zone: UTC-6 (Central Standard Time)

Tapalpa (Spanish: [ta'palpa]) is a town and municipality in Jalisco, a state of central-western Mexico. It has an oceanic climate.

== History ==
The word "Tapalpa" comes from the Nahuatl word "tlapalpan" meaning "land of colors."

The region was inhabited by the Otomi prior to the arrival of the Spanish.

In 1523, the Spanish, led by Alonso de Ávalos Saavedra, reached the region. They encountered a native tribe called Atlacco, who did not resist the Spanish colonizers. In 1531, a group of Franciscan friars began evangelizing to the natives.

By 1825, Tapalpa was already registered as a town and in 1869 it was declared a municipality.

The first paper factory in Latin America was opened in Tapalpa in 1840. The factory shut down and was abandoned in 1923 due to the Mexican Revolution. Today its abandoned ruins have become a tourist attraction.

The town was ravaged by the Jalisco New Generation Cartel on 22 February 2026 when the leader of the CJNG, Nemesio Oseguera Cervantes was killed by the Mexican Army as a result of the 2026 Jalisco operation. This led the CJNG to attack the town (plus other parts of Jalisco and 14 other Mexican states) as a form of retaliation. Oseguera, also known as "El Mencho," was confirmed to have been in Tapalpa when he was killed.

== Geography ==
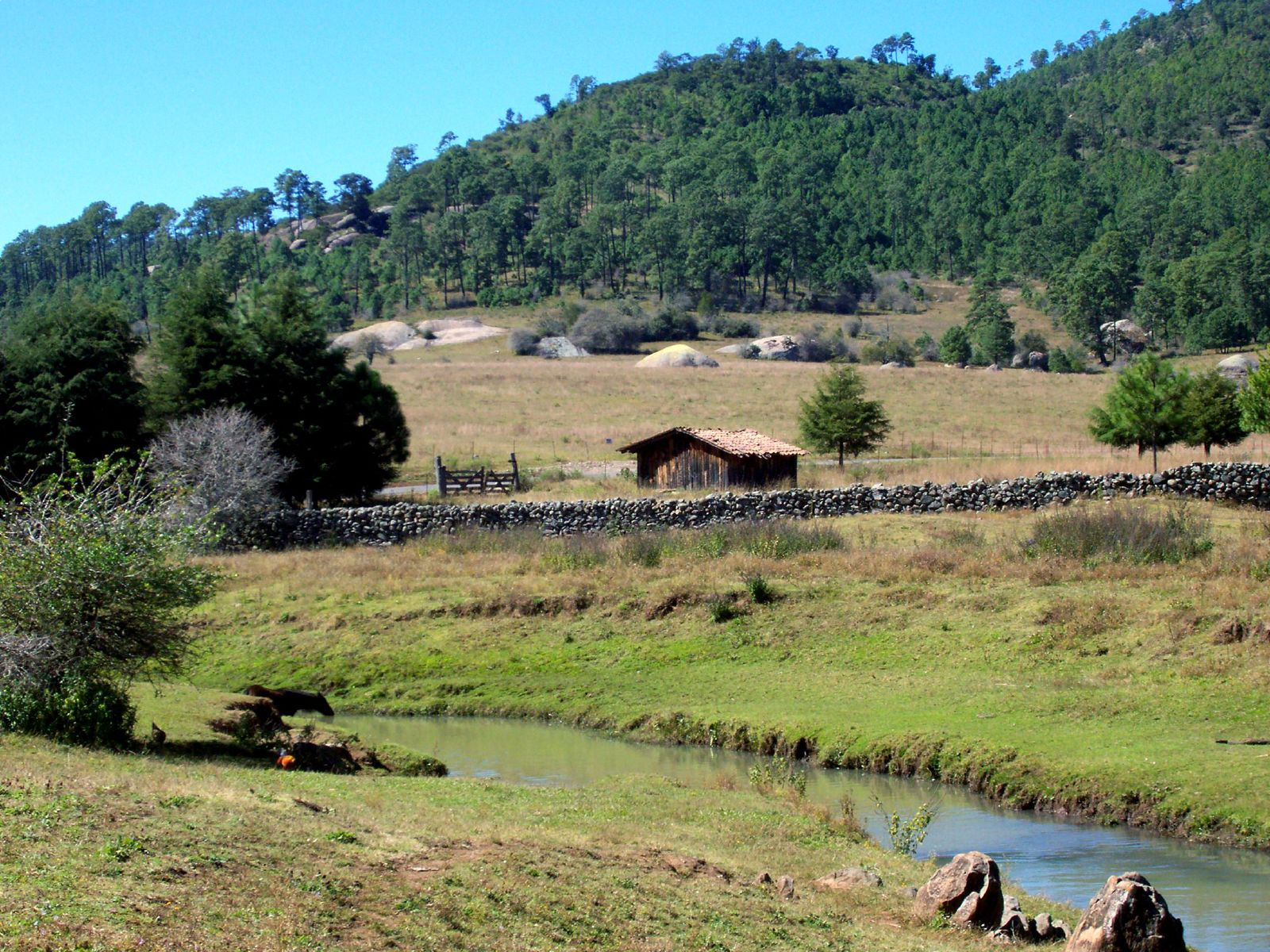
Countryside with forests

Tapalpa is located in the southern region of the state of Jalisco. The municipality covers an area of 619.4 km^{2}. As of 2015, the total population of the municipality was 19,506 of which 5,566 lived in the town of Tapalpa. It is located along the Sierra Madre Occidental. It contains approximately 17,735 hectares of forest made up mostly pine, oak, and ash trees. Deer, rabbits and snakes are common in the area.

Tapalpa receives an average of 883.1 millimeters of rain annually, most of it between June and October.

With a height of 105 meters, the Salto del Nogal is the tallest waterfall in the state of Jalisco. It is located 10 km from the city of Tapalpa.

Climate data for Tapalpa (1991–2020 normals, extremes 1923–present)
Month	Jan	Feb	Mar	Apr	May	Jun	Jul	Aug	Sep	Oct	Nov	Dec	Year
Record high °C (°F)	31 (88)	33 (91)	34 (93)	38.3 (100.9)	41.3 (106.3)	42.3 (108.1)	40.3 (104.5)	36.3 (97.3)	38 (100)	42 (108)	31 (88)	31 (88)	42.3 (108.1)
Mean daily maximum °C (°F)	22.4 (72.3)	24.0 (75.2)	25.9 (78.6)	27.9 (82.2)	28.7 (83.7)	26.0 (78.8)	24.3 (75.7)	24.4 (75.9)	24.3 (75.7)	24.3 (75.7)	24.0 (75.2)	23.1 (73.6)	24.9 (76.8)
Daily mean °C (°F)	12.9 (55.2)	13.9 (57.0)	15.4 (59.7)	17.1 (62.8)	18.8 (65.8)	18.9 (66.0)	17.9 (64.2)	18.0 (64.4)	18.1 (64.6)	16.9 (62.4)	15.2 (59.4)	13.7 (56.7)	16.4 (61.5)
Mean daily minimum °C (°F)	3.4 (38.1)	3.9 (39.0)	4.8 (40.6)	6.3 (43.3)	8.9 (48.0)	11.8 (53.2)	11.5 (52.7)	11.5 (52.7)	11.8 (53.2)	9.5 (49.1)	6.3 (43.3)	4.2 (39.6)	7.8 (46.0)
Record low °C (°F)	−5 (23)	−6 (21)	−3 (27)	−4 (25)	0 (32)	0 (32)	1 (34)	1 (34)	2 (36)	0 (32)	−2 (28)	−4 (25)	−6 (21)
Average precipitation mm (inches)	40.0 (1.57)	22.6 (0.89)	14.6 (0.57)	10.0 (0.39)	53.2 (2.09)	170.1 (6.70)	184.5 (7.26)	151.7 (5.97)	147.3 (5.80)	110.8 (4.36)	35.8 (1.41)	22.3 (0.88)	962.9 (37.91)
Average precipitation days	3.1	2.6	2.4	1.1	7.0	19.3	23.4	21.9	19.9	14.4	4.4	2.4	121.9
Source: Servicio Meteorológico Nacional

== Architecture ==
Tapalpa is known for its traditional buildings with white facades and red roofs. Some traditional public fountains where people used to get their daily water are still conserved.

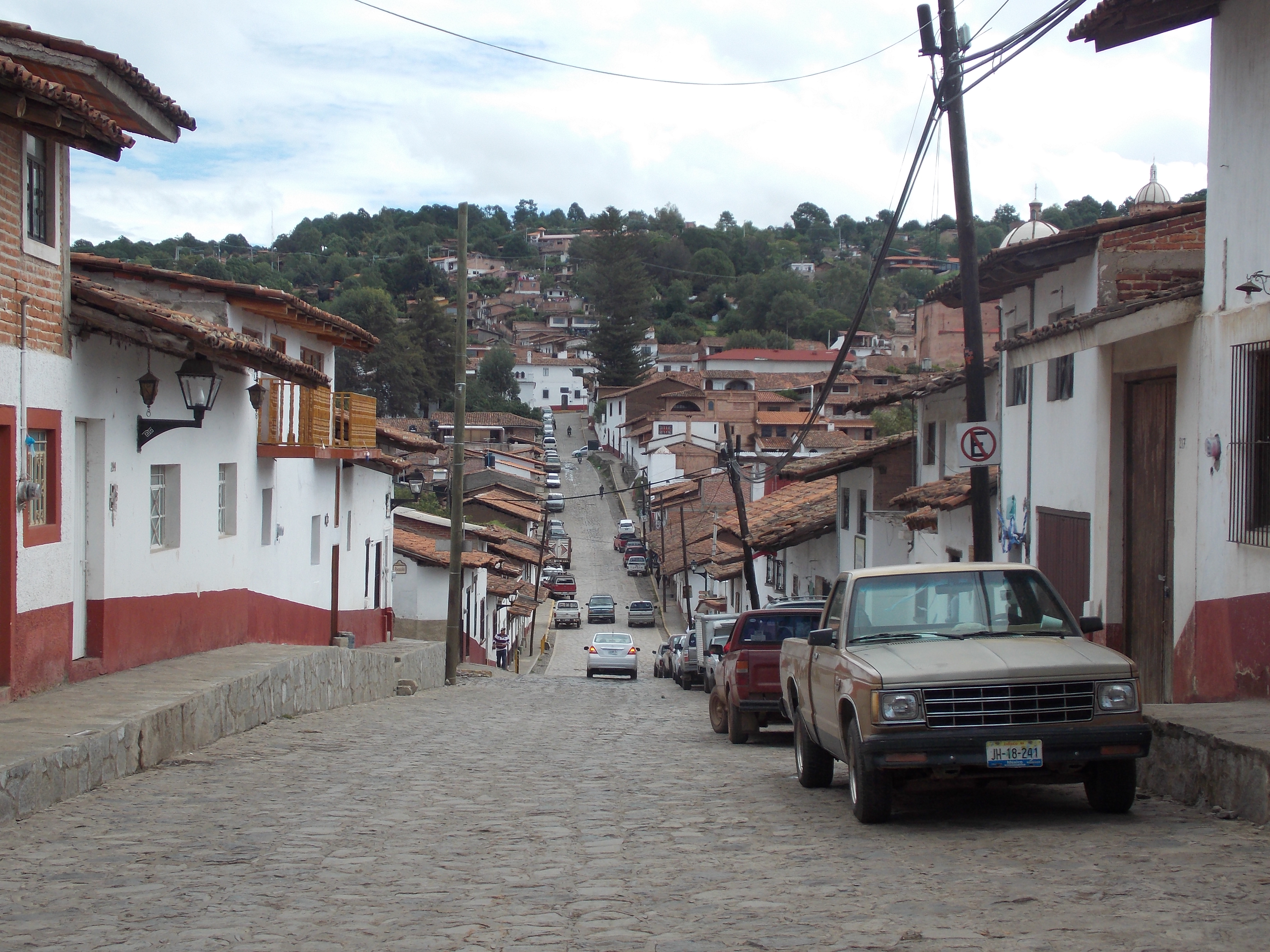
Street in Tapalpa

The Temple of San Antonio was built in 1650 by the Franciscans. It is notable for its large vaulted ceiling. A local legend says that a group of bandits once tried to rob the temple but were stopped by a mysterious man dressed in black. It is said that that man was Saint Anthony of Padua, the patron saint of the temple.

Due to damages to the Temple of San Antonio, it became necessary to build another church. The construction of the Church of Nuestra Señora de Guadalupe began in 1950. The construction of the new church was paid for by the contributions of the locals. The church is built almost entirely of red brick.

== Government ==
=== List of municipal presidents ===
Term	Municipal president	Political party	Note
1901–1902	Ramón Ramírez		
1903	Manuel Preciado		
1904–1905	Ramón Ramírez		
1905	Camilo González		
1906–1907	Manuel L. Corcuera		
1907	Alberto Palos		
1908	Ramón Ramírez		
1909	Juan F. de la Torre		
1910	Federico Gálvez		
1911	Francisco Galindo Ceballos		
1911	Ignacio L. Ramírez		
1911	Ignacio Preciado		
1912–1913	Ignacio L. Ramírez		
1914–1917	??		
1918	Teodoro González		
1919–1920	Catarino L. de la Torre		
1921	Benjamín Contreras		
1922	Ignacio T. Ramírez		
1922	Vidal Pérez		Acting municipal president
1922	Wilibaldo de la Torre		Acting municipal president
1922	Guillermo Manzano		Acting municipal president
1923	Francisco Manzano		
1924	Eduardo Vielma		
1925	J. Clemente Guerrero		
1926	J. Jesús Valencia		
1927	J. Santos González		
1928–1929	José Alcaraz		
1930–1931	José Rodríguez Montes de Oca	PNR	
1932	Desiderio Rodríguez	PNR	
1933	José Rodríguez Montes de Oca	PNR	
1934–1935	Francisco Manzano	PNR	
1936	Ignacio T. López	PNR	
1937	Ignacio T. Ramírez	PNR	
1938	Jesús de la Torre	PRM	
1939–1940	Ignacio T. López	PRM	
1941–1942	Ángel Manzano de la Torre	PRM	
1943–1944	Francisco Manzano	PRM	
1945–1946	Cenobio Lepe	PRM	
1947	Ignacio T. López	PRI	
1948	Miguel de la Torre Aguilar	PRI	
1949–1952	Luis Gómez Méndez	PRI	
1953–1955	Miguel de la Torre Aguilar	PRI	
1956–1958	Guadalupe Nava López	PRI	
1959–1961	Miguel de la Torre Aguilar	PRI	
1962–1964	Ángel Manzano de la Torre	PRI	
1965–1967	Ignacio Lepe Munguía	PRI	
1968–1970	Javier de la Torre López	PRI	
1971–1973	José Luis Toscano	PRI	
1974–1976	J. Jesús Ávalos Enríquez	PRI	
1977–1979	Rafael Córdova Díaz	PRI	
1980–1982	Guadalupe Nava López	PRI	
1983–1985	Luis Arturo Manzano Cueto	PRI	
1986–1988	Antonio Toscano	PRI	
1989–1992	Rafael Córdova Díaz	PRI	
1992–1995	Pedro Zamora López	PRI	
1995–1997	José Luis Arias Rodríguez	PRI	
1998–2000	Arnoldo Zamora Jiménez	PRI	
2001–2003	Ramón García Velasco	PRI	
01/01/2004–31 December 2006	José Ángel Delgado Rodríguez	PAN	
01/01/2007–31 December 2009	José Guadalupe Homar Ledezma Delgado	PRD; PT	Coalition "For the Good of All"
01/01/2010–30 September 2012	Juan Manuel Rubio Pérez	PRI; Panal	Coalition "Alliance for Jalisco"
01/10/2012–30 September 2015	Martín Daniel Bacilio	Panal	
01/10/2015–30 September 2018	Antonio Morales Díaz	PRD	
01/10/2018–30 September 2021	Luz Elvira Manzano Ochoa	PAN; PRD; MC	Coalition "Jalisco to the Front"
01/10/2021–30 September 2024	Antonio Zamora Velazco	MC	
01/10/2024–	Antonio Morales Díaz	Morena	

== Tourism ==
In 2001, Mexico's Secretariat of Tourism launched the Programa Pueblos Magicos in order to recognize towns across the country notable for their cultural and historical importance. Tapalpa was registered as a Pueblo Magico in 2002.

The area is a popular weekend destination for residents of nearby Guadalajara. Countryside cabins are available to rent for the night. There are many excellent outdoor restaurants that specialize in grilled meats. The Presa Salto del Nogal lake is located within the municipality.

It is located in a region of Jalisco known as Lagunas (lakes).

=== Las Piedrotas ===
Valle de los Enigmas, also known as las Piedrotas (Spanish "The Big Stones"), is a popular hiking destination in Tapalpa. It is notable for its large natural monoliths. It is located 4 km north of the city. Zip-lining and horseback riding are popular activities.

== Notable people ==
- Atala Apodaca (1884-1977), teacher, author, and feminist
- Cipriano Campos Alatorre (1906-1934), teacher, novelist
- Luis Enrique Bracamontes (1923-2003), civil engineer and politician
