= Aguililla =

Municipality in Michoacan, Mexico

- City and municipality
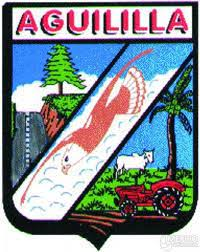
- Coat of arms

- Municipality of Aguililla location

- Location within Michoacán
- Coordinates: 18.7377°N 102.7900°W
- Country: Mexico
- State: Michoacán

Population
  - Total: 14,754
  - Seat: 8,505

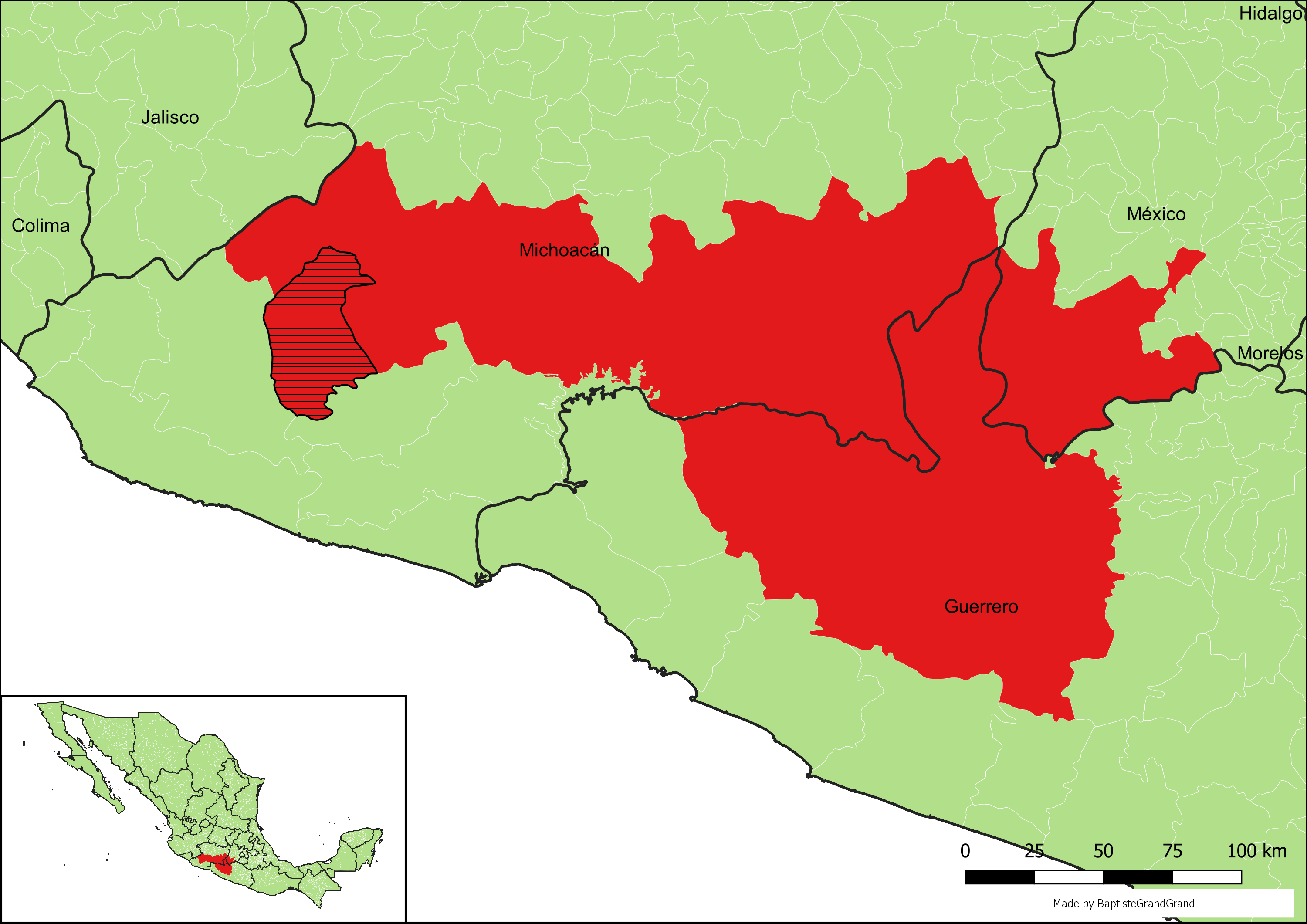
Location of Aguililla in the Tierra Caliente region. Tierra Caliente Hatched: Aguililla

Aguililla (Spanish pronunciation: [aɣ̞iˈliʝa]) is a city and municipality in the Mexican state of Michoacán. The municipality has a population of roughly 15,000. It is located in the western part of the st

Starting in late 2019, Aguililla has been the center of a conflict between two of the most notorious drug cartels in the country—Jalisco New Generation Cartel (CJNG) and Cárteles Unidos.

== Notable people ==
- Moisés Muñoz, Mexican former professional footballer (goalkeeper)
- Abigael González Valencia, Mexican drug lord (CJNG) and brother of Elvis González Valencia and Rosalinda González Valencia
- Nemesio Oseguera Cervantes, Mexican drug lord, leader of CJNG and younger brother of Antonio Oseguera Cervantes
- Rosalinda González Valencia, Mexican businesswoman, money launderer, wife of Nemesio Oseguera Cervantes and sister of Abigael González Valencia and Elvis González Valencia
- Antonio Oseguera Cervantes, Mexican drug lord and older brother of Nemesio Oseguera Cervantes
- Elvis González Valencia, Mexican drug lord and brother of Abigael González Valencia and Rosalinda González Valencia

== See also ==
- Capture of Aguililla
