= El Mencho =

Mexican drug lord (1966–2026)

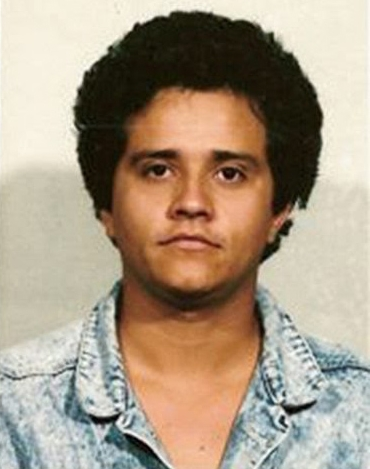
- Mugshot photo of Oseguera in 1989
- Born: Rubén Oseguera Cervantes; 17 July 1966; Aguililla, Michoacán, Mexico
- Died: 22 February 2026 (aged 59); Tapalpa, Jalisco, Mexico
- Cause of death: Gunshot wounds
- Other names: El Mencho; El Mata Zetas (Note: Originally the Jalisco New Generation Cartel was known as "Los Mata Zetas" and was an armed wing of the Sinaloa Cartel created specifically to fight the Los Zetas Cartel (which at that time was the most violent cartel in the world and also Mexico).); Don Nemesio; El Señor de los Gallos (Note: He was a big fan of cockfighting, a tradition typical of Michoacán (his home state).)
- Occupation: Drug lord
- Years active: 1986–2026
- Organization: Jalisco New Generation Cartel
- Predecessor: Ignacio Coronel Villarreal
- Successor: Juan Carlos Valencia González
- Criminal status: Deceased
- Spouse: Rosalinda González Valencia (m. 1996; sep. 2018) (Note: According to Sedena, Rosalinda and El Mencho had been separated since 26 May 2018 and he was in a relationship with a woman named Guadalupe Moreno Carrillo since then. However, Rosalinda and El Mencho remained married as of January 2025)
- Children: Rubén Oseguera González; Jessica Johanna Oseguera González; Laisha Michelle Oseguera González
- Relatives: Abigael González Valencia (brother-in-law)

Notes
- Bounty: US$15 million offered from the U.S. government; MX$300 million offered from Mexico's Office of the Attorney General (PGR).

Nemesio Rubén Oseguera Cervantes (Note: In this Spanish name, the first or paternal surname is Oseguera and the second or maternal family name is Cervantes.) (Note: Latin American Spanish pronunciation: [neˈmesjo ruˈβen oseˈɣeɾa seɾˈβantes].) (born Rubén Oseguera Cervantes; 17 July 1966 – 22 February 2026), commonly referred to by his alias "El Mencho", (Note: Diminutive of Nemesio, Latin American Spanish pronunciation: [el ˈmentʃo].) was a Mexican drug lord and head of the Jalisco New Generation Cartel (CJNG), an organized crime group based in Jalisco. He was the most wanted person in Mexico and one of the most wanted in the United States at the time of his death. The U.S. government and the Mexican government were offering rewards of up to US$15 million and MXN$300 million, respectively, for information leading to his arrest.

Oseguera Cervantes was wanted for drug trafficking, organized crime involvement, and illegal possession of firearms. El Mencho was allegedly responsible for coordinating global drug trafficking operations.

Born into poverty in the state of Michoacán, El Mencho grew avocados and dropped out of primary school before immigrating illegally to the U.S. in the 1980s. After being arrested several times, he was deported to Mexico in the early 1990s and worked for the Milenio Cartel. He eventually climbed to the top of the criminal organization and founded the CJNG after several of his bosses were arrested or killed. Under his command, the CJNG became one of Mexico's leading criminal organizations.

His notoriety was also a result of his aggressive leadership and sensationalist acts of violence against rival criminal groups and Mexican security forces alike. These attacks brought him increased government attention and an extensive manhunt. Security forces suspected he was hiding in a rural area of Jalisco, Michoacán, Nayarit, or Colima, and that he was guarded by mercenaries with military training.

On 22 February 2026, Oseguera was seriously injured during a Mexican military operation in Tapalpa, Jalisco, and died en route to Mexico City from his gunshot wounds. The operation, aided by U.S. intelligence, triggered widespread retaliatory violence by the CJNG, including road blockades, vehicle fires, and clashes that killed at least 25 National Guard members.

== Early life ==
Nemesio Oseguera Cervantes was born on 17 July 1966 in the rural community of Culotitlán in Aguililla, Michoacán. (Note: According to the United States Department of the Treasury, he has a listed alternative date of birth for 17 July 1965. The Drug Enforcement Administration (DEA) states he was born in Guadalajara, Jalisco. Other sources state he was born in Uruapan, Michoacán.) His first name was cited as "Rubén" and/or "Nemesio". He had alternative aliases such as "Nemecio", "Rubén Acerguera Cervantes", "Lorenzo Mendoza", and "Nemesio Oseguera Ramos". Some sources state that his birth-given name was Rubén but that he changed it to Nemesio in memory of his godfather. He was widely known by his alias "El Mencho", a nickname that derives from Nemesio. Another nickname was "The Lord of the Roosters", said to be derived from his love for cockfighting.

El Mencho grew up in a poor family that cultivated avocados. He had five brothers: Juan, Miguel, Antonio, Marín, and Abraham. He dropped out of primary school in fifth grade to work in the fields. At the age of 14, he started guarding marijuana plantations. A few years later, he decided he wanted a better life for himself and immigrated illegally to the U.S. state of California in the 1980s. To conceal his identity in the U.S., he used different names and combinations, such as "Rubén Ávila", "José López Prieto", "Miguel Valadez", "Carlos Hernández Mendoza", and "Roberto Salgado", among others.

=== Time in the U.S. ===
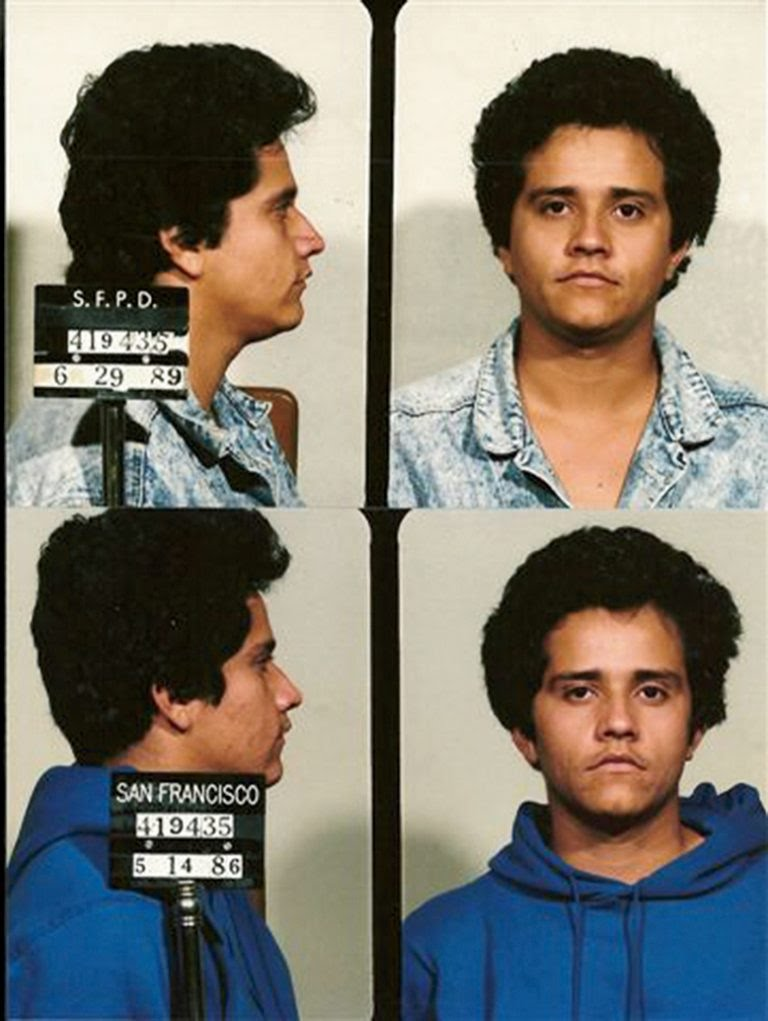
Mugshots of Oseguera taken in 1986 and 1989

In 1986, he lived in the San Francisco Bay Area. He was arrested by the San Francisco Police at the age of 19 for stealing property and carrying a loaded gun. Two months after his arrest, his first child was born. According to border entry records, El Mencho crossed the U.S.–Mexico border several times during the late 1980s under other aliases. The DEA and Mexican investigators believe that it was during this time that he became involved in methamphetamine production and trade in Redwood City, alongside his brother-in-law Abigael González Valencia (alias "El Cuini").

In 1989, El Mencho was arrested again in San Francisco for selling narcotics. He was deported to Mexico several months later, but re-entered the U.S. and resettled in San Francisco. In September 1992, he was arrested again, this time on federal drug charges in Sacramento, California. According to court records, El Mencho and his brother Abraham were at a San Francisco bar known as the Imperial to carry out a heroin deal: five ounces for US$9,500. Abraham was in charge of the transaction, while El Mencho acted as a lookout. El Mencho was 26 years old at the time, much younger than Abraham, but was savvy enough to recognize that the transaction was a set-up by the police. He told his brother that the men to whom they gave the heroin handed over perfectly stacked dollar bills instead of loose ones. Through a wiretap conversation, the police overheard El Mencho warning his brother to never do business with them again since they were undercover cops.

=== Arrest and deportation ===
Three weeks after the incident both men were arrested by police. In court, El Mencho insisted that he was innocent. He said he was not involved in the heroin deal and that the undercover agents were lying about him handling the drugs. The prosecution insisted that both siblings were working together. El Mencho was left with few options; if he pleaded not guilty, his brother Abraham—who already had felony drug sentences on his record—would probably face life in prison. His defense understood that if he decided on a jury trial, he would likely be convicted. He decided to plead guilty and protect his brother from life imprisonment. He was sentenced to five years and imprisoned at the Big Spring Correctional Center in Texas, which houses a large population of undocumented immigrants.

After three years he was released from prison on parole and deported to Mexico at the age of 30. In Mexico, he joined the local police forces of Cabo Corrientes and Tomatlán in the state of Jalisco. After some time he left the police and joined organized crime as a full-time member of the Milenio Cartel. To strengthen his relationship with the Milenio Cartel, El Mencho married one of the clan leader's sisters, Rosalinda González Valencia. It was in this criminal group that El Mencho would become a leading figure in organized crime.

== Rise to leadership ==
In the Milenio Cartel, El Mencho started as a member of the assassin squad that protected the drug lord Armando Valencia Cornelio (alias "El Maradona"). On 12 August 2003, his boss was arrested by Mexican authorities. Around the same time, a rival criminal group known as Los Zetas, with the backing of the Gulf Cartel, carried out an armed offensive against the Milenio Cartel in Michoacán. The attack forced the Valencia family to exile in Jalisco.

El Mencho relocated in the state capital, Guadalajara, with his father-in-law José Luis González Valencia (alias "El Quini") and Román Caballero Valencia. In Jalisco, El Mencho and the Milenio Cartel formed an alliance with the Sinaloa Cartel subgroup headed by Ignacio "Nacho" Coronel, a high-ranking drug lord and ally of Joaquín "El Chapo" Guzmán. Under Coronel, El Mencho and his group managed the Sinaloa Cartel's drug operations, finances, and murder activities in the states of Colima and Jalisco.

On 28 October 2009, the Milenio Cartel's top leader Óscar Orlando Nava Valencia (alias "El Lobo") was arrested. On 6 May 2010, his brother Juan Carlos (alias "El Tigre") was arrested too. Two months later, Coronel was killed in a shootout with the Mexican Army. Following their downfalls, the Milenio Cartel began to rupture and El Mencho tried to take over its leadership structure.

One sect within the Milenio Cartel wanted to appoint as the leader of the group Elpidio Mojarro Ramírez (alias "El Pilo"), who worked closely with Óscar Orlando and Juan Carlos before their arrests. Érick Valencia Salazar, one of the clan members, wanted El Mencho to take command. El Mencho then asked the other Milenio bloc to hand over Gerardo Mendoza (alias "Tecato" and/or "Cochi") for killing a group of men that reported to him in Tecomán, Colima. The other division refused El Mencho's request, prompting an internal war.

The Milenio Cartel split into two. One side was known as La Resistencia (The Resistance), the other was Los Mata Zetas (The Zeta Killers), headed by El Mencho. La Resistencia accused Los Mata Zetas of turning in Óscar Orlando to the authorities. A war ensued, and the two groups fought for the drug smuggling turfs in Jalisco.

To legitimize its presence, El Mencho's group launched a propaganda campaign against its enemies, denouncing extortions done by rival gangs against civilians, businessmen, and government authorities. Los Mata Zetas eventually won the war and consolidated their influence in western Mexico. The group then changed its name to the Jalisco New Generation Cartel (Spanish: Cártel de Jalisco Nueva Generación, or CJNG).

== Leadership tenure ==
As leader of the CJNG, El Mencho solidified his position and grew his organization through territorial expansion and by corrupting government officials. The CJNG went from being a small, offshoot criminal gang to one of the leading criminal groups in Mexico. Throughout the process, El Mencho established himself as one of Mexico's most-wanted criminals. His rise to fame was due to a number of factors, including the aggressive and sensationalist displays of public violence by the CJNG. The direct attacks of the CJNG against Mexico's security forces earned El Mencho a reputation among authorities as "principal enemy" of the state and as a dangerous criminal. In addition, the fall of Mexico's former top crime bosses cleared the way for El Mencho to gain visibility and status.

He consolidated his operations in Jalisco and its adjacent states by fighting off incursions from criminal groups like Los Zetas and the Knights Templar Cartel. According to government sources, he was responsible for overseeing the CJNG's entire drug trafficking operations in the states of Jalisco, Colima, and Guanajuato, where he created a bastion for methamphetamine production and trade.

Their operational capacity in Mexico is concentrated in eight states: Jalisco, Colima, Guanajuato, Nayarit, and Veracruz, where it holds a firm grip of drug trafficking operations, and Morelos, Guerrero and Michoacán, where it fights competing rival drug groups. Between 2014 and 2016, the only region in the country where the CJNG lost its territorial presence was in Mexico City. Internationally, the CJNG reportedly has ties with criminal groups in the U.S., the rest of Latin America, Europe, Asia, and Africa. On an international scale, the CJNG is mainly focused on trafficking cocaine and methamphetamine.

El Mencho was able to make the CJNG one of Mexico's most profitable criminal gangs. The government estimates that El Mencho's group has about US$50 billion in total assets. This success was shared with Abigael González Valencia, his brother-in-law, who headed a drug trafficking group known as Los Cuinis, allied to the CJNG. Abigael was arrested by the Mexican Navy on 28 February 2015. Part of El Mencho's success in the drug trade had to do with his ability to strategize market and consumer changes. Initially, the CJNG produced methamphetamine, but then he moved to heroin production when the consumer demand changed.

In 2019, Kyle Mori, the head of the DEA team tasked with locating El Mencho, stated in an interview with Univision that he believed El Mencho had a net worth of at least $500 million and he could also be worth over $1 billion.

=== Manhunt ===
On 25 August 2012, a unit of the Mexican Federal Police based in Tonaya, Jalisco, responded to an anonymous tip stating that there was an organized crime cell present in a rural community close by. When security forces got to the area, a shootout broke out between the two parties. Six CJNG gunmen were killed in the firefight. Initial reports stated that El Mencho was captured in the operation, but the Mexican government later confirmed that he was not in custody. Other reporting stated the U.S authorities had alerted the Mexican authorities based on their surveillance of the subject's girlfriend who was importing methamphetamine at Gulfport, Mississippi.

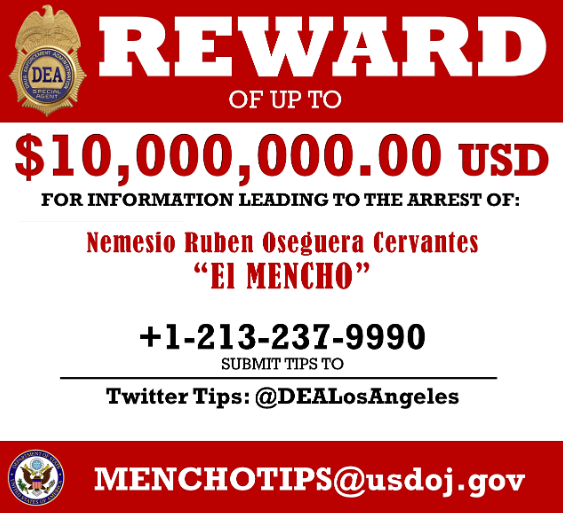
Fragments of a wanted poster of Nemesio Oseguera Cervantes (alias "El Mencho"), offering US$10 million for information leading to his arrest.

In a series of highly coordinated tactics to prevent El Mencho's arrest, the CJNG blocked several highways and roads across the Guadalajara Metropolitan Area by setting at least 37 vehicles on fire. The purpose of the burning vehicles was to place them as blockades to impede security forces from traveling across Jalisco's capital and give El Mencho ample time to escape. The blockades were placed in strategic routes to prevent police reinforcements from coming in or leaving Guadalajara. After the attacks were over, the government confirmed that El Mencho was in the area and had evaded capture.

On 19 March 2015, in Ocotlán, Jalisco, CJNG gunmen ambushed a Federal Police convoy. The total death toll was 11; five police officers, three civilians, and three CJNG gunmen. The attack was a response by the CJNG to protect El Mencho, who was reportedly in the area for a meeting. On 23 March, Heriberto Acevedo Cárdenas (alias "El Gringo" and "El Güero"), one of El Mencho's close associates, was killed in a shootout with the Federal Police in Zacoalco de Torres, Jalisco. Three other CJNG suspects were killed. According to government sources, Acevedo Cárdenas directed CJNG cells in Zacoalco, Tlajomulco, Cocula, Tapalpa and Atemajac de Brizuela, Jalisco.

In response to Cárdenas' death, El Mencho commanded the CJNG to carry out attacks against the Mexican Federal Police. On 30 March, CJNG gunmen in Zapopan, Jalisco, ambushed a convoy containing Alejandro Solorio Aréchiga, Jalisco's security commissioner. No one was killed in the fire exchange.

On 6 April, CJNG gunmen blocked a road in San Sebastián del Oeste, Jalisco, with a burning vehicle and opened fire at a convoy of the Jalisco State Police, killing 15 policemen and wounding 5 more. The incident was the deadliest single attack on the Mexico's police force since 2010. That same day, Miguel Ángel Caicedo Vargas, the police chief of Zacoalco de Torres, was killed by CJNG hitmen.

A month later on 1 May 2015, the Mexican government launched Operation Jalisco, a military-led campaign that was intended to combat organized crime groups in Jalisco and capture their respective leaders. The announcement came after a series of violent attacks from the CJNG in previous weeks. The day the operation was inaugurated, intelligence reports stated that El Mencho was in Tonaya, which prompted an offensive to apprehend him. As security forces moved to the area where El Mencho was allegedly hiding, a gunfight broke out between law enforcement officials and gunmen from the CJNG.

In the small town of Villa Purificación, Jalisco, El Mencho's men shot down a Mexican Army helicopter with a rocket-propelled grenade launcher, killing nine soldiers. The battle extended throughout several municipalities in Jalisco; El Mencho's men blockaded several roads across the Guadalajara area to slow down the mobilization of law enforcement and facilitate their leader's escape. The CJNG set 39 buses, 11 banks, and 16 gas stations on fire. The attack spread through 20 different towns and in three neighboring states.

According to the Mexican government, El Mencho was believed to be hiding in the state of Jalisco, the CJNG's stronghold. They believed he did not stay in one place for long, and travelled across several municipalities in Jalisco and into the states of Michoacán, Colima, and Nayarit. He usually travelled across the mountains and rural terrains in these areas since they provide multiple escape routes in the event that security forces attempt to encircle him. Authorities suspected El Mencho's inner circle was made up of mercenaries with former military training. His second security circle was much larger in size and served as a rearguard to notify El Mencho's inner circle of suspicious activity and ambush potential parties that attempt to get close to him. El Mencho was believed to have lived a modest lifestyle compared to other drug kingpins such as Joaquín "El Chapo" Guzmán and other members of the CJNG in order to keep a low profile and to avoid detection from law enforcement.

== Criminal charges ==
The DEA office in Los Angeles, California, tracked El Mencho's activities for many years, and detected that the CJNG had expanded its drug-trafficking operations internationally. In 2000, the U.S. government discovered that El Mencho was involved in an international cocaine and methamphetamine operation. Five years later, they discovered he had used firearms to facilitate his operations.

In 2007, the DEA found that El Mencho was involved in a cocaine operation that went through Colombia, Guatemala, Mexico, and ended in the United States. They also uncovered a second cocaine shipment from Colombia, Mexico, to the United States. In 2009, the DEA detected that El Mencho was involved in another cocaine shipment originating from Ecuador. Two more shipments were then detected in 2013 from Mexico then again to the United States. In 2014, however, the DEA noticed a radical shift in the CJNG's modus operandi; El Mencho was discovered to have coordinated a methamphetamine shipment that went from Mexico to Australia then to the U.S. by leveraging China-based gangs.

On 27 September 2011, Mexico's Office of the General Prosecutor (PGR) issued an arrest warrant for El Mencho and offered MXN$2 million to anyone who could help provide information that led to his arrest. He was accused of organized crime involvement and illegal possession of firearms. In March 2014, the United States District Court for the District of Columbia, based on previous investigations by the DEA, indicted El Mencho for several charges, including drug trafficking and for being the leader of a "Continuing Criminal Enterprise". El Mencho and Abigael were accused of coordinating shipments of cocaine and methamphetamine from South America via Mexico to the United States. They also stated that the CJNG and Los Cuinis coordinated the collection and delivery of the drug proceeds from the U.S. to Mexico. In addition, the United States District Court for the Western District of Texas was looking to convict El Mencho of drug trafficking offenses.

On 18 December 2017, seventeen year-old YouTube star Juan Luis Lagunas Rosales, known as "El Pirata de Culiacán" (English: The Pirate from Culiacán), was gunned down in a bar in Jalisco by a group of four men armed with rifles, shortly after Lagunas Rosales published videotaped insults towards El Mencho. Police are investigating whether El Mencho gave the order to execute him, but no charges have been filed.

On 15 August 2018, the PGR announced they were offering up to MXN$30 million to anyone who provides information that leads to El Mencho's capture. This announcement was made public when the DEA and Mexican authorities prepared to reveal a new cooperation plan against organized crime, which included a stronger focus against their financial structure and the creation of a law enforcement group responsible for investigating international cases. The bounty derives from a new arrest warrant issued against him for his alleged participation in masterminding the kidnapping and murder of two agents of the Criminal Investigation Agency (AIC), a branch of the PGR, in February 2018.

On 16 October 2018, the Departments of State, Justice, and Treasury announced a joint law-enforcement measure against the CJNG, and increased El Mencho's bounty to US$10 million from US$5 million. This increase was one of the largest approved in the history of the Narcotics Rewards Program.

In December 2024, it was announced that the bounty on El Mencho would increase from US$10 million to US$15 million.

=== Kingpin Act designation ===
On 8 April 2015, the United States Department of the Treasury's Office of Foreign Assets Control (OFAC) sanctioned El Mencho under the Foreign Narcotics Kingpin Designation Act ("Kingpin Act") for his involvement in international drug-smuggling operations. The sanction was a joint investigation conducted by the Treasury and the DEA office in Los Angeles as part of a larger effort with their Mexican counterparts to sanction drug trafficking groups in Mexico. The sanction extended to the CJNG, his brother-in-law Abigael González Valencia, and Los Cuinis. As part of the sanction, all the U.S.-based assets and/or assets in control of U.S. individuals on behalf of El Mencho, González Valencia, the CJNG, and Los Cuinis, were frozen in the United States. In addition, the act prohibited U.S. citizens from engaging in business activities with them.

On 17 September 2015, the OFAC sanctioned five businesses in Jalisco for financially supporting the CJNG and El Mencho's operations. This sanction was the result of another investigation done by the Treasury and the DEA office in Los Angeles. As before, all of the U.S.-based assets of these businesses were frozen, and U.S. citizens were prohibited from doing business with them. The businesses were a sushi restaurant in Puerto Vallarta and Guadalajara, a tequila company in Guadalajara, (Note: Other sources state that the tequila company is based in Tepatitlán, Jalisco.) a rental cabin business in Tapalpa, and an advertising firm and agricultural company, both in Guadalajara. According to the report, the diversity of these businesses showed that CJNG was successful at penetrating the economy.

On 27 October 2016, the OFAC sanctioned nine more individuals for providing material and financial assistance to El Mencho and González Valencia and their respective groups, the CJNG and Los Cuinis. This sanction was also the result of another investigation done by the Treasury and the DEA office in Los Angeles. This sanction was an attempt by the U.S. government to disrupt the inner circle of complicit family members within the CJNG and Los Cuinis and affect their finances in Mexico's domestic economy. The individuals sanctioned were El Mencho's brother Antonio; his son-in-law Julio Alberto Castillo Rodríguez; five of González Valencia's siblings: Arnulfo, Édgar Edén, Elvis, Marisa Ivette, and Noemí; businessman Fabián Felipe Vera López; and attorney María Teresa Quintana Navarro. All their U.S.-based assets were frozen, and once again U.S. citizens were prohibited from doing business with them.

=== Global terrorist designation ===
During the second presidency of Donald Trump, El Mencho was sanctioned and formally classified as a Specially Designated Global Terrorist (SDG) in response to the severity of his activities related to the fentanyl crisis and extreme violence in Mexico. This action follows the recent designation of the CJNG as a Foreign Terrorist Organization (FTO) and SDG.

== CJNG infighting and split ==
In March 2017, El Mencho ordered the murder of El Cholo, a former CJNG member who betrayed the CJNG by co-founding the Nueva Plaza Cartel and conspiring against his former allies. El Cholo was marked for death by El Mencho after he murdered a CJNG financial operator nicknamed "El Colombiano", but the assassination attempt was a failure. El Cholo afterwards retaliated by co-founding a new cartel called the Nueva Plaza Cartel. CJNG co-founder Erick Valencia Salazar also split with El Mencho and became a high-ranking leader in the Nueva Plaza Cartel. They also have formed a rivalry with El Mencho and the CJNG as well. El Cholo was later murdered, with his body being discovered stabbed and wrapped in plastic on a park bench in downtown Tlaquepaque on 18 March 2021.

== Family ==
El Mencho had five brothers: Juan, Miguel, Antonio, Marín, and Abraham. In the 1990s, Abraham was given a 10-year prison sentence in California. In 2013, Mexican authorities accused him of murder in Michoacán. The charges were later dropped and the case was closed.

Marín was accused in a California court, but the charges are not available to the public. Antonio lived in the U.S. and was released from a Mississippi prison in 2001 after completing a sentence for property damage. He was arrested in Jalisco on 4 December 2015, by the Mexican Army and Navy for working as one of El Mencho's top financial operators. According to the Mexican government, Juan and Miguel are involved with the CJNG. Juan was charged in Michoacán for burglary, but the case was later dismissed.

Rosalinda González Valencia was El Mencho's wife. They had three children: Jessica Johanna Oseguera González, Laisha, and Rubén Oseguera González (alias "El Menchito). Jessica Johanna is married to Julio Alberto Castillo Rodríguez (alias "El Ojo de Vidrio"), first arrested on 1 May 2015. He was released on 1 July for lack of evidence, but was re-arrested again on 6 April 2016, for his involvement in the CJNG.

El Mencho's son Rubén was regarded by the Mexican government as the second-in-command in the CJNG prior to his arrest in 2014. He was released from prison on several occasions for lack of evidence, but was re-arrested each time by the police on additional charges. Rubén was extradited to the United States on 21 February 2020 and was later convicted by a Washington D.C.-based federal jury on various murder, drug trafficking and firearm charges in September 2024.

Mexican authorities suspected in 2016 that Omar Eleazar Oseguera Cervantes was part of the CJNG leadership structure. Though he has the same last names as El Mencho, he was listed as being his nephew and not as one of his brothers. He reportedly works as one of his top security chiefs. El Mencho's brother-in-law Elvis González Valencia was arrested in 2016 as well. He had served as the CJNG's lead financier. He was later released in December 2016.

In May 2018, El Mencho's wife Valencia was arrested on money laundering charges. Rosalinda was later released after being granted a bail of MX$1.5 million (US$78,000) in September 2018, but remains under criminal charges.

In April 2019, El Mencho's godson Adrián Alonso Guerrero Covarrubias was arrested on charges of drug trafficking and kidnapping. Guerrero served as El Mencho's regional head in the Ciénega and northern Los Altos regions in Jalisco, along with southeastern Guanajuato.

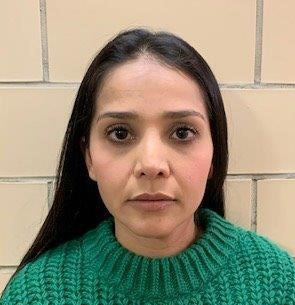
Jessica Johanna Oseguera González

In February 2020, El Mencho's daughter Jessica Johanna, 33, known as "La Negra", was arrested in Washington D.C. when she went to see her brother Rubén, who had been extradited to the US for drug trafficking. She was charged with engaging in transactions or dealings in properties with businesses blacklisted by the Treasury Department and providing financial support to the CJNG. She pleaded guilty on 12 March 2021, and on 11 June was sentenced to 2½ years in prison. In April 2022, Jessica Johanna Oseguera González was released from prison.

In November 2021, Valencia, known as "La Jefa," was arrested in Zapopan, Jalisco. At the time of this arrest, El Mencho's wife was found to be the financial chief of the CJNG.

In December 2022, El Mencho's brother Antonio Oseguera Cervantes, known as "El Tony Montana," was arrested during an army raid in Guadalajara. Authorities have stated that he was a logistics operator of the CJNG, supplying weapons, laundering money, and coordinating actions against other cartels. During his arrest, the army confiscated multiple weapons. On 27 February 2025, Antonio was extradited from Mexico to the United States.

In November 2024, El Mencho's son-in-law Cristian Fernando Gutiérrez Ochoa, a high-ranking CJNG leader who notably faked his death and took up residency in California under an assumed identity, was arrested in Riverside, California. Gutiérrez Ochoa was previously reported to be the romantic partner of El Mencho's daughter Laisha in April 2022. El Mencho assisted the scheme to fake Gutiérrez Ochoa's death by falsely telling associates that he killed his son-in-law for lying. The scheme to fake Gutiérrez's death occurred after he was charged with a 2021 kidnapping of two Mexican Navy members. However, the charges for which Gutiérrez was arrested in California involved drug trafficking and money laundering. The U.S. Department of Justice also stated that Laisha had been living with Gutiérrez in the United States, and had even been living in the country just prior to his arrival from Mexico after he faked his death. According to the Justice Department, Gutiérrez fled Mexico in part to join El Mencho's daughter in the United States.

On 20 June 2025, Gutiérrez Ochoa, also known as "El Gaucho," pled guilty in the United States to one count of international money laundering conspiracy, with the charge resulting in him facing a maximum penalty of 20 years in prison. In his guilty plea, El Gaucho admitted to being vital to CJNG's money laundering operation, especially from 2023 up to his arrest in 2024, using sophisticated methods involving real estate transactions, shell companies, and international money transfers. On 18 December 2025, Gutierrez-Ochoa was sentenced to serve 140 months (more than 11 years} in a U.S. federal prison.

On 28 February 2025, El Mencho's older brother Abraham, also known "Don Rodo", was recaptured by Mexican authorities. Regarded as a founder of CJNG, Don Rodo was vital to the cartel's money laundering and property purchasing operations, reportedly also working alongside CJNG notary public offices in Ciudad Guzmán and Autlán de Navarro to manage changes of ownership of the properties he purchased for El Mencho. The arrest came a year after Don Rodo was briefly imprisoned for nine days in April 2024. In February 2026, it was reported that Abraham was still "in the hands of Mexican authorities" since his February 2025 arrest.

At the time of his death in February 2026, it was revealed that El Mencho's influence in the CJNG had initially come through his marriage to Valencia. At the same time, it was also revealed by Mexico City-based security consultant David Saucedo that El Mencho's son being jailed in the United States broke the line of succession, with his stepson Juan Carlos Valencia González (“El Pelon”) and only one of El Mencho's brothers being family members most likely to be candidates as his successor. Despite this claim, his brother Abraham was soon afterwards revealed to still be in custody. "El Pelon" was also acknowledged by Saucedo to lack "influence among other cartel commanders. El Mencho's son-in-law Julio Alberto Castillo Rodríguez (“El Chorro”) has also been designated as a CJNG leader as well.

At the time of his death, El Mencho, who separated from Valencia in 2018, was involved with a different romantic partner. Despite this, "El Pelon," his stepson, was still considered to be El Mencho's "de facto second in command" by the U.S. Director of National Intelligence's (DNI) National CounterTerrorism Center. El Pelon was also later confirmed to have succeeded El Mencho as head of the CJNG.

== Health ==
In 2020, it was reported that El Mencho suffered from kidney disease and had built a hospital in the village of El Alcíhuatl to help treat it. The lack of public sightings fueled speculation that El Mencho was seriously ill or dead. However, authorities stated that there was no reliable evidence confirming his death or any serious health condition.

== Death ==
On 22 February 2026, Oseguera was captured by the Mexican Army during a security operation in Tapalpa, Jalisco, and he later died from injuries sustained during the crossfire while being transported to Mexico City.

The operation sparked clashes in the area, resulting in multiple vehicles being set on fire throughout Jalisco. The police said shootouts and explosions were reported during the clashes. The number of casualties is currently unknown. Criminal groups blocked roads with burning vehicles in Jalisco and in the states of Guanajuato, Nayarit, Michoacán and Tamaulipas.

With his son Rubén Oseguera González ("El Menchito") being imprisoned in the United States, Oseguera had no clear successor, leaving the CJNG with a major power vacuum.

Oseguera was buried in Zapopan following an elaborate funeral ceremony on 3 March that saw him interred in a golden casket.

On March 18, 2026, the Wall Street Journal reported that Juan Carlos Valencia González, El Mencho's stepson through his marriage, was now the CJNG's new leader. On April 6, 2026, El Pais would also confirm Valencia Gonzalez becoming head of the CJNG, having successfully worked his way through the power vacuum created by El Mencho's death.

== See also ==
- List of fugitives from justice who disappeared
- Mexican drug war
