= Antonio Oseguera Cervantes =

Mexican cartel leader (born 1958)

- Born: 20 August 1958 (age 68); Aguililla, Michoacán, Mexico
- Other names: Tony Montana; Joel Mora Garibay
- Employer: Jalisco New Generation Cartel
- Criminal status: Extradited to the United States
- Relatives: Nemesio Oseguera Cervantes (brother)

Antonio Oseguera Cervantes (Spanish pronunciation: [anˈtonjo ose'ɣera seɾˈβantes]; born 20 August 1958) is a Mexican suspected drug lord and former high-ranking leader of the Jalisco New Generation Cartel (CJNG), a criminal group based in Jalisco. His brother was Nemesio Oseguera Cervantes (alias "El Mencho"), the leader of the CJNG and one of Mexico's most-wanted drug lords. In Mexico, he was formally charged in 2015 for drug trafficking and being in possession of military-exclusive firearms.

On 3 December 2015, Oseguera Cervantes was arrested while driving in Tlajomulco, Jalisco. He was imprisoned at the Federal Social Readaptation Center No. 11, a maximum-security prison in Sonora. The following year, the United States Department of the Treasury sanctioned him under the Foreign Narcotics Kingpin Designation Act for providing financial and material assistance to the CJNG. A judge later released him from prison after determining that there were violations in his due process. He would again be arrested on 20 December 2022. He would be extradited to the United States on 27 February 2025.

== Early life and career ==
Antonio Oseguera Cervantes was born on 20 August 1958, in Aguililla, Michoacán, Mexico. He uses another formal name, Joel Mora Garibay, and often goes by his alias "Tony Montana". He reportedly has five brothers: Nemesio, Juan, Miguel, Marín, and Abraham. His criminal background dates back to the 1990s. In 1996, Oseguera Cervantes was arrested for heroin charges in the U.S. and deported to Mexico, where he renewed his drug trafficking activities. Several of his siblings were also accused of heroin distribution or other crimes in the U.S. that decade. In 2001, Oseguera Cervantes was released from a prison in Mississippi after being convicted for property damage. (Note: One source confused this date with 18 July 2008.)

His brother Nemesio (alias "El Mencho") was the leader of the Jalisco New Generation Cartel (CJNG) and one of Mexico's most-wanted drug lords. Under his sibling, Oseguera Cervantes was responsible for supervising the buying and selling of firearms for the CJNG. He was also responsible for managing money laundering schemes and passing on information of law enforcement activities to the CJNG. According to Mexican security forces, he mostly coordinated the CJNG operations while based in the Guadalajara Metropolitan Area.

On 27 October 2016, the United States Department of the Treasury sanctioned nine Mexican nationals, including Oseguera Cervantes, under the Foreign Narcotics Kingpin Designation Act (also known as the "Kingpin Act") for their alleged involvement in money laundering and/or international drug trafficking. They were accused of providing financial and material assistance to his brother Nemesio and his in-law Abigael González Valencia (alias "El Cuini"), the two leaders of the CJNG and Los Cuinis. (Note: Abigael González Valencia was arrested on 28 February 2015, in Puerto Vallarta, Jalisco.) As a result of this sanction, Oseguera Cervantes' assets in the U.S. were frozen and U.S. citizens were prohibited from carrying out transactions with him; the other individuals sanctioned were Julio Alberto Castillo Rodríguez; González Valencia clan members Arnulfo, Édgar Edén, Marisa Ivette, Noemi, and Elvis; businessman Fabián Felipe Vera López and attorney María Teresa Quintana Navarro.

== 2015 arrest ==
On 3 December 2015, Oseguera Cervantes was driving in Tlajomulco, Jalisco, when he noticed the presence of the Federal Police and the Mexican Army. As he tried to avoid passing through them at a checkpoint near his home, the officers ordered him to stop. (Note: Other sources state he was arrested early in the morning of 4 December 2015.) The police had followed his tracks for six months and knew that he was trying to live under a low profile to avoid the detection of law enforcement. Oseguera Cervantes was driving a 2010 Volkswagen Jetta, was not accompanied by a bodyguard, and claimed to be a clothing merchant. He identified himself using an ID with his other alias, Joel Mora Garibay. The police arrested him and seized his vehicle, two assault rifles, a handgun, and a package with an undisclosed amount of narcotics. (Note: Preliminary reports confused Oseguera Cervantes with Otoniel Mendoza (also known as "Tony Montana"), a former member of the CJNG who was arrested in 2012.) The Federal Police chief Enrique Francisco Galindo Ceballos confirmed his arrest the following day in a press conference. He stated that Oseguera Cervantes was a high-ranking leader of the CJNG and that his arrest was a major blow to the group's financial circle.

=== Imprisonment and release ===
On 4 December, he was transferred to Mexico City and sent to the SEIDO installations, Mexico's anti-organized crime investigatory agency, for his legal declaration. On 7 December, he was sent to the Federal Social Readaptation Center No. 11, a maximum-security prison in Hermosillo, Sonora. The Office of the General Prosecutor (PGR) confirmed that he was charged with drug trafficking and possession of military-exclusive firearms. A federal court in Jalisco confirmed the charges on 15 December after it concluded that the PGR provided sufficient evidences against him. The court also specified that Oseguera Cervantes was found in possession of methamphetamine (1000.1 grams) with intent to distribute.

On 18 December, Oseguera Cervantes' defense issued a writ of amparo to an appeal court in Mexico City and requested them to remove his charges. The court investigated the injuries he had after he was arrested, and analyzed whether he was tortured to confess or if they were a result of him resisting arrest. The court struck the injunction after it considered that the charges against him were serious in nature and that the arrest was lawful.

On 15 July 2016, an appeal court in Jalisco granted Oseguera Cervantes a writ of amparo after it discovered that he was formally charged with drug trafficking and possession of military-exclusive weapons without a required signature by a judge in one of the documents used in the case. The unsigned court document contained information about fingerprint evidence that linked Oseguera Cervantes to the weapons and drugs seized at the moment of his arrest. It also included information of the defense's vehicle and his mental and behavioral exams conducted by criminal investigators. The appeal court stated that the lack of signature affected Oseguera Cervantes' legal representation and thus constituted a violation in the legal process. This pushed back the case against Oseguera Cervantes to its initial stages. He was later released from prison after a judge considered that there were violations in his due process.

== 2022 arrest ==
On 20 December 2022, Oseguera Cervantes was captured while in possession of weapons in a suburb of Guadalajara. Authorities said he oversaw violent actions and logistics, and bought weapons and laundered money for the cartel.

== Extradition to the United States ==
On 27 February 2025, Oseguera Cervantes along with 28 other narco figures were extradited to the United States. News Nation afterwards reported that the extradition had high-ranking Jalisco New Generation members worried, as he could have information about the whereabouts of his brother, and CJNG leader, Nemesio Oseguera Cervantes. There were also fears of retaliation that could spread as far as Webb County, Texas.

== See also ==
- Mexican drug war

== Sources ==
Footnotes
