= El Menchito =

Mexican-American drug lord (born 1990)

- Born: Rubén Oseguera González; 14 February 1990 (age 36); San Francisco, California, U.S.
- Other name: Rubén Garibay González
- Employer: Jalisco New Generation Cartel (suspected)
- Criminal penalty: Life imprisonment plus 30 years
- Criminal status: Imprisoned at ADX Florence
- Children: 3
- Parents: El Mencho (father); Rosalinda González Valencia (mother)
- Relatives: Jessica Johanna Oseguera González (sister); Laisha Michelle Oseguera González (sister); Abigael González Valencia (uncle)

Notes
- Convicted in the United States District Court for the District of Columbia for murder, drug trafficking and firearm charges

Rubén Oseguera González (Spanish pronunciation: [ruˈβen oseˈɣeɾa ɣonˈsales]; born 14 February 1990), commonly referred to by his alias El Menchito (Spanish pronunciation: [menˈtʃito]), is a Mexican and American convicted drug lord and former high-ranking member of the Jalisco New Generation Cartel (CJNG), an organized crime organization based in Jalisco. He is the son of Nemesio Oseguera Cervantes ("El Mencho"), the former leader of the CJNG and most-wanted man in Mexico until his death in 2026.

Under his father, Oseguera González allegedly worked as the second-in-command of the cartel, and managed international drug trafficking operations. Oseguera González was first arrested in January 2014 in Jalisco, but was released in October for lack of evidence and re-arrested immediately as he walked out of prison. He was then released again in December after a judge considered the evidence against him as insufficient. In June 2015, Oseguera González was arrested again, released a month later, and re-arrested as his release order was made official.

Oseguera González faced trial in Mexico for money laundering and illegal possession of military-exclusive firearms. In 2017, the United States District Court for the District of Columbia charged Oseguera González with international drug trafficking, accusing him of being responsible for shipping narcotics to the U.S. from Mexico between 2007 and 2017. Mexico's Secretariat of Foreign Affairs approved his extradition request in 2018, and Oseguera González's motions to prevent his extradition was denied. Oseguera González was extradited to the U.S. in February 2020, and was convicted by a Washington D.C.-based court in September 2024. On 7 March 2025, Oseguera González was sentenced to life imprisonment.

== Early life and career with the CJNG ==
Rubén Oseguera González was born on 14 February 1990, in San Francisco County, California, the second-born child of Rosalinda González Valencia and Nemesio Oseguera Cervantes. He has several aliases, including "Rubén Garibay González", "El Junior", "El Rubencito", "El Rojo", "El Niño", and "El Menchito". His last nickname is a diminutive of his father's alias “El Mencho”, a phonetic derivation of his name Nemesio. His mother Rosalinda was a member of the Valencia crime family, which founded and ran the Milenio Cartel. His father Nemesio (alias "El Mencho") was also a former Milenio member, as well as the founder and leader of the Jalisco New Generation Cartel (CJNG).

Oseguera González also holds Mexican citizenship, and has two sisters: Jessica Johana and Laisha Michelle.

According to Mexican government sources, Oseguera González acted as the CJNG's second-in-command, just below his father. He was allegedly responsible for managing the CJNG's operations in buying and selling narcotics from South America to Mexico. Oseguera González was accused of overseeing multiple operations of the CJNG, including:

- coordinating stolen gasoline sales in Jalisco,
- leading a group of hitmen who killed people who refused to work with the CJNG,
- overseeing sicario operations responsible for defending CJNG territory in Jalisco and Colima from rival gangs like the Knights Templar Cartel and Los Zetas, and
- managing the CJNG's financial assets.

== 2014 arrest ==
=== Phone-tapping and geolocating ===
Since 2013, Mexican authorities were investigating a public telephone booth line and two cellphones in the Guadalajara Metropolitan Area linked with high-ranking leaders of the CJNG. According to intelligence reports, one of the mobile lines received a call from the public booth line in the Jardines Universidad neighborhood of Zapopan, prompting an investigation. The Mexican Army asked the Criminal Investigation Agency (AIC) branch of the Office of the General Prosecutor (PGR) to investigate the neighborhood and phone lines more closely. The Mexican Army began to dispatch undercover agents to monitor the neighborhood.

On the evening of 29 January 2014, one of the mobile phones was located through geolocation at a neighborhood in Zapopan, before it went out of service. The Army and the Navy decided to send a Special Forces unit from Mexico City to Zapopan to investigate the incident.

At 3:30 a.m. CT on 30 January, the Special Forces unit raided a residence in the Patria Universidad neighborhood of Zapopan, where Oseguera González was sleeping. As the authorities took down the doors, Oseguera González woke up from the loud noise, jumped from his bed, ran to the backyard, and climbed the back wall to reach his neighbor's property; however, the Special Forces unit had already surrounded the adjoining premises as well. He eventually surrendered and was arrested in his neighbor's backyard. Two of Oseguera González’ bodyguards surrendered at the residence’s door without resisting arrest. Two other guards, who were renting a nearby house, fled on foot but were arrested too. Then-Attorney General of Mexico Jesús Murillo Karam confirmed to the press that no shots were fired in the operation.

Oseguera González reportedly offered the officers who detained him around MXN$17 million to let him go. Authorities confirmed that they confiscated between MXN$10 to $16 million and US$500,000 at the crime scene, as well as 4 assault rifles, 9 handguns, a grenade, and several rounds of ammunition.

Oseguera González was flown that day to Mexico City and taken to the SEIDO headquarters, Mexico's anti-organized crime investigatory agency, where he gave his statement and was interrogated by law enforcement. Government sources confirmed that he had no pending formal investigations or arrest warrants issued against him in Jalisco. On 1 February, Oseguera González was taken to Federal Social Readaptation Center No. 1 Altiplano prison in Almoloya de Juárez, State of Mexico. Authorities later confirmed that he was arrested because of pending charges of money laundering, drug trafficking, and illegal possession of weapons for military-exclusive use. Oseguera González pleaded not guilty, and claimed that he worked in construction and as a car salesperson since he was 16 years old. He also claimed that properties under his name were inherited from his mother, after she allegedly bought them when he was younger and put them under his name.

In response to Oseguera González's arrest, CJNG gunmen hijacked three buses and set them on fire throughout the Guadalajara Metropolitan Area; no deaths or injuries were reported. The U.S. Consulate General in Guadalajara sent a warning to U.S. citizens in the city and asked them not to travel in the southern part of the urban area, including the main roads leading to Guadalajara International Airport. Once the attacks concluded, the Mexican government asked civilians to remain calm and resume their daily activities. Authorities stated that they would remain on alert throughout the Guadalajara area for other violent responses from organized crime.

=== Rearrest and releases ===
On 16 October 2014, Oseguera González was released from Altiplano, as a judge from the State of Mexico absolved him of the charges, but he was re-arrested immediately after walking out of prison by members of the AIC. Once in custody, he was then taken again to the SEIDO headquarters and imprisoned there for two months while the PGR worked on getting his jurisdiction to open a trial against him. On 18 December, he was sent to the Federal Social Readaptation Center No. 2 Puente Grande prison in Jalisco.

On 26 December, Oseguera González was released from Puente Grande after a judge concluded that there was insufficient evidence against him for the additional charges of drug trafficking, overseeing the CJNG's financial operations, and leading a group of hitmen. (Note: Another source states that a judge ordered his release on 1 January 2015.)

== 2015 arrest ==
On 23 June 2015, Oseguera González was again arrested by the Mexican Army, as well as by the Federal Police, in the Lomas de Altamira neighborhood of Zapopan, along with his brother-in-law Julio Alberto Castillo Rodríguez. The officers entered the private neighborhood in several vehicles at around 2:15 a.m. CT, and subdued the entrance’s security guard. The officers then shot the security cameras with paintball guns or destroyed them to obscure their view, and asked the security guard to cut the electrical power in the vicinity, before asking him to kneel down while the officers entered the neighborhood and apprehended Oseguera González, who was inside a vehicle with Rodríguez Castillo. The operation lasted about 20 minutes and no shots were fired. Authorities confiscated several weapons, including 2 customized AR-15 assault rifles engraved with the insignias "CJNG 02 JR" and "Menchito".

According to government sources, Oseguera González was trying keep a low profile following his previous arrest and had undergone a nose surgery to alter his identity. (Note: Another source stated that it was unclear if Oseguera González had done the surgery to alter his appearance.) He travelled without bodyguards to avoid attracting attention from law enforcement. The government officially confirmed his identity through DNA, physical, and photo evidence. At the time of his arrest, he was wanted for organized crime involvement, money laundering, and kidnapping. The Mexican government alleged that when Oseguera González was released from prison the year before, he rejoined the CJNG and began managing their international drug trafficking operations. Once in custody, he was sent to Mexico City and once again transferred to SEIDO, where he gave his formal declaration. As Oseguera González arrived at the SEIDO via helicopter, a Black Hawk helicopter of the Federal Police with snipers guarded the headquarters.

On 27 June, a federal judge in Toluca issued an arrest warrant for Oseguera González. He was then transferred to Altiplano prison. Oseguera González's defense argued that their client was detained on illegal grounds due to double jeopardy, as some of the charges he was arrested for were absolved by a judge before. The PGR countered this argument by saying that the judge's actions did not mean an absolution from the charges imposed.

=== Release and re-arrest ===
On 1 July 2015, a federal judge from the State of Mexico ordered Oseguera González's release after concluding that the evidence against him was insufficient and that his due process had been violated. The judge stated that when Oseguera González was arrested in June, the officers did not have an arrest warrant against him and entered his private property without legal authorization. He also stated that the detainee was in custody for 9 hours and without a lawyer before he was sent to the justice department. When the judge considered that authorities had failed to prove that Oseguera González was involved in organized crime, he was released. This was the third time he had been released in less than a year. However, as Oseguera González was walked out of Altiplano, he was re-arrested by the PGR, who had a pending arrest warrant against him. According to government sources, he was wanted for organized crime involvement and for participating in the disappearance of two individuals in Tepalcatepec, Michoacán. He was sent again to the SEIDO installations by helicopter and escorted by an armed Blackhawk helicopter.

On 3 July, a federal court approved the PGR's request to keep Oseguera González under a 40-day preventative detention while authorities work on gathering more evidence against the defense. The request was carried out as part of an investigation by the SEIDO against Oseguera González for his alleged participation in kidnapping. Oseguera González's defense, however, responded by issuing a writ of amparo in hopes of preventing their client from being detained without charges being filed. A judge denied the defense's request to remove their client's preventative detention on 16 July. On 12 August, a federal judge approved the PGR's request to extend Oseguera González's preventative detention for 40 additional days in order to allow authorities to continue working on gathering evidence against the defense. Later that day, the PGR decided to remove his preventative detention after considering that they had found enough evidence against him. On 13 August, he was issued an arrest warrant and transferred to Altiplano prison on organized crime and bribery charges. The kidnapping charges were suspended. Oseguera González was also investigated for his alleged participation in the murder of four people at a restaurant in Zapopan on 17 May 2013. According to the detainees, Oseguera González planned the attack.

== Imprisonment and legal status ==
On 28 August 2015, a federal court issued an arrest warrant against Oseguera González and charged him with illegal possession of firearms, using ammunition of exclusive military use, having five weapons of exclusive military use, and organized crime involvement. (Note: A detainee in possession of at least five weapons of exclusive use from the Mexican Armed Forces is charged with acopio de armas.) In October, Oseguera González was transferred from Altiplano to Federal Social Readaptation Center No. 3 (also known as "Noreste") in Matamoros, Tamaulipas. He issued a writ of amparo after claiming that he endured mistreatment and torture. That same month, the PGR opened another case and issued another arrest warrant to charge Oseguera González for acting as the CJNG's second-in-command and ordering homicides against rival drug members. They also stated that he was responsible for coordinating international drug trafficking shipments. The evidence presented to the court consisted of intelligence reports gathered by law enforcement and lawyers. On 4 November, a federal court charged Oseguera González with drug trafficking along with five other suspected CJNG members.

Oseguera González issued another writ of amparo in early 2016 to request a transfer back to Altiplano. In February 2016, however, he was transferred to Federal Social Readaptation Center No. 13 in Miahuatlán de Porfirio Díaz, Oaxaca. His defense responded by preparing a writ of amparo for the supposed violations against their client. On 30 June, the PGR via a federal judge in Toluca issued an arrest warrant against Oseguera González and charged him with illegal possession of firearms, using ammunition of military-exclusive weapons, being in possession of at least five military-exclusive weapons, and organized crime involvement. On 22 August, the writ of amparo for mistreatment and torture issued months before was struck down by a judge after he spoke with the prison staff, who denied their involvement in such violations.

On 10 November, a judge approved Oseguera González's request to receive a conjugal visit. The defendant claimed that he was limited by the prison staff from speaking to his lawyers in the past. The judge did not comment on this matter. On 21 February, a court approved Oseguera González's writ of amparo and invalidated his formal imprisonment for organized crime charges. The judge concluded that the charges had several flaws and the evidence presented was insufficient. According to the court, Oseguera González's organized crime charges were based on the testimonies of two Federal Police officers, who described to investigators that he was part of the leadership structure of the CJNG. The judge did not consider this evidence sufficient because the police did not establish how or where they got this information.

The PGR submitted the weapons seized during Oseguera González's arrests, and a cap with the insignias of the CJNG that Oseguera González had in his possession when he was taken into custody, as evidence of his alleged involvement in organized crime. They also mentioned his biological relationship with his father and the fact that two alleged members of the CJNG told investigators that Oseguera González worked below him as evidence. The judge did not agree that the weapons and the cap proved Oseguera González's militancy in the CJNG. The judge also dismissed the two testimonies of the alleged CJNG members because they gave conflicting assertions when investigators showed them a picture of Oseguera González and asked them to identify him. Oseguera González was not released from prison because he had four additional pending charges that were not invalidated by the court.

On 9 March 2018, a penal court judge tried to have Oseguera González transferred from Oaxaca to the Puente Grande. In July 2019, Oseguera González was transferred to the Federal Social Readaptation Center No. 15, a maximum-security prison in Chiapas. Authorities did this after suspected organized crime members uploaded a video on social media warning of Oseguera González's plot to escape from prison. On 29 August 2019, a federal judge absolved Oseguera González of organized crime involvement and ordered his immediate release. However, he was kept in custody for two additional charges: money laundering and illegal possession of military-exclusive firearms. On 6 September 2019, Oseguera González was transferred to the Federal Social Readaptation Center No. 11 in Hermosillo, Sonora. The Secretariat of Security and Civilian Protection (SSPC) confirmed that Oseguera González stay in Sonora was temporary, and confirmed that the U.S. had an outstanding extradition request against him.

== Extradition process ==
=== Approval process ===
On 3 February 2017, the United States District Court for the District of Columbia issued an arrest warrant against Oseguera González. The Drug Enforcement Administration (DEA) stated that he had been involved in importing and distributing narcotics from Mexico to the U.S. since 2011. The DEA stated that Oseguera González had several other aliases, including "Rubencito", "El Rojo", "El Ruso", and "El Niño". According to the report, the United States Department of Justice was going to seize all of Oseguera González assets in the U.S. that were a result of his drug proceeds. With the arrest warrant, the U.S. government could formally request his extradition to the U.S.

On 4 October 2018, Mexico's Secretariat of Foreign Affairs (SRE) approved Oseguera González's extradition to the U.S. He issued a writ of amparo to prevent his extradition. On 16 October 2018, the United States Department of State, Treasury, and Justice announced a joint law enforcement measure against the CJNG, and publicized previously sealed indictments charging Oseguera González. The report stated that between 2007 and February 2017, Oseguera González was responsible for importing and distributing narcotics in the U.S. from Mexico, and of using firearms during and to retaliate for his alleged drug trafficking activities. The U.S. government confirmed that the extradition of Oseguera González was pending.

In July 2019, Oseguera González's writ of amparo issued against the SRE's extradition approval was denied. His defense argued that Oseguera González was not the person the U.S. government was looking for, and that he was not the son of Oseguera Cervantes. This statement was provided by the defense and support by one of their witnesses. In addition, Oseguera González's defense argued that extraditing him to the U.S. would be unconstitutional because the charges he faces in the U.S. could carry life imprisonment, a conviction length that does not exist in Mexico.

=== Extradition and convictions ===
On 21 February 2020, Oseguera González was extradited to the U.S. He arrived at Dulles International Airport in Washington, D.C. and appeared before a judge that day to face his outstanding charges. On 20 September 2024, Oseguera González was convicted by a federal jury of various drug-related charges and the downing of a Mexican military helicopter during the 1 May 2015 Jalisco attacks. On 24 September 2024, he would also be convicted of drug trafficking and firearm related charges which involved conspiring to distribute five kilograms or more of cocaine and 500 grams or more of methamphetamine while knowing and intending that they would be imported into the United States, and using, carrying, and brandishing firearms, including destructive devices, in furtherance of the drug trafficking conspiracy. On 7 March 2025, Oseguera González received a sentence of life plus 30 years in prison. As of November 2025, Oseguera González is held at ADX Florence, the federal supermax prison in Florence, Colorado.

== Impact of United States jailing on CJNG leadership ==
At the time of his father's death in February 2026, it was revealed that Oseguera Gonzalez ("El Menchito") being jailed in the United States had in fact broke the line of succession for the CJNG. With Oseguera Gonzalez now being held in the United States, his father now had no direct succession, with a power vacuum now being created in the CJNG in the wake of Nemesio "El Mencho" Oseguera's death.

== See also ==
- Mexican drug war
