= Sole Front for Women's Rights =

Mexican feminist organization

- Abbreviation: FUPDM
- Formation: 28 August 1935
- Founded at: Mexico City
- Dissolved: 19 February 1938
- Purpose: Feminist advocacy
- Members: est. 50,000+ at peak
- Secretary-general: María del Refugio García

The Sole Front for Women's Rights (Note: "Sole Front for Women's Rights" is the most common translation. Also translated as "United Front for Women's Rights" or "Single Front for Women's Rights".) (Spanish: Frente Único Pro Derechos de la Mujer, FUPDM) was a coalition of Mexican feminist organizations founded in 1935. It was the dominant feminist organization in Mexico during the second half of the 1930s. Prior to its founding, feminist activist Elvia Carrillo Puerto organized several National Congresses of Women Workers and Peasants. These congresses were characterized by ideological clashes between communist factions and those aligned with the then-ruling National Revolutionary Party (Spanish: Partido Nacional Revolucionário, PNR). Eventually, both sides called for a unified women's organization, leading to the establishment of the FUPDM. This new organization consolidated numerous existing women's groups under the leadership of María del Refugio García. Its political platform focused on women's rights, calling for suffrage and wage increases, as well as broader social and political reforms.

In its early years, the FUPDM addressed various local issues, and establishing the National Women's Suffrage Council. After the Senate of the Republic's rejection of women's suffrage in 1937, the FUPDM organized protests, supported female political candidates in PNR primaries. When those candidates were rejected by the PNR, the FUPDM led a hunger strike, prompting President Lázaro Cárdenas to propose a bill establishing women's full citizenship. However, internal divisions arose within the FUPDM, with the majority prioritizing women's suffrage while a smaller faction, influenced by Juana Belén Gutiérrez de Mendoza's anti-suffragist and anti-patriarchal ideas, advocated for a broader social reorganization, leading to the formation of the Women's Revolutionary Institute.

In 1938, Cárdenas proposed integrating the FUPDM into the newly renamed Party of the Mexican Revolution (Spanish: Partido de la Revolución Mexicana, PRM). The FUPDM agreed to this integration, which ultimately caused its fragmentation into smaller interest groups, drawing criticism from some members who feared a loss of unified focus on women's issues. While the FUPDM is widely recognized as a significant organization in the history of women's activism in Mexico, scholars such as Esperanza Tuñón Pablos and Jocelyn Olcott argue that its close ties to the PNR/PRM ultimately contributed to its decline and the marginalization of women's issues within the broader political left.

== Background ==
=== Cristero War ===
In 1926, the Cristero War began in the states of Jalisco and Michoacán. Initiated by Catholic bishops in response to anti-clerical policies adopted by the Mexican government, the rebellion received the support of many women. The war ended in 1929. That same year, President Plutarco Elías Calles founded the National Revolutionary Party (Spanish: Partido Nacional Revolucionario, PNR) to reconsolidate civilian, military, and labor leadership in the wake of the Mexican Revolution. The new party, prompted by questions about women's role in society following the Cristero War, developed a political platform regarding women, calling for their integration into "civic life". This involved vocational training for women, as well as establishing benefit societies, employment agencies, and worker cooperatives. As part of this platform, the PNR created the Army of Peasant Women, an organization that provided land for peasant women to collectively cultivate. The Army's activity declined in November 1931. That year, feminist activist Elvia Carrillo Puerto organized the Women's Action Guiding League under the auspices of the PNR.

=== National Congresses of Women Workers and Peasants ===
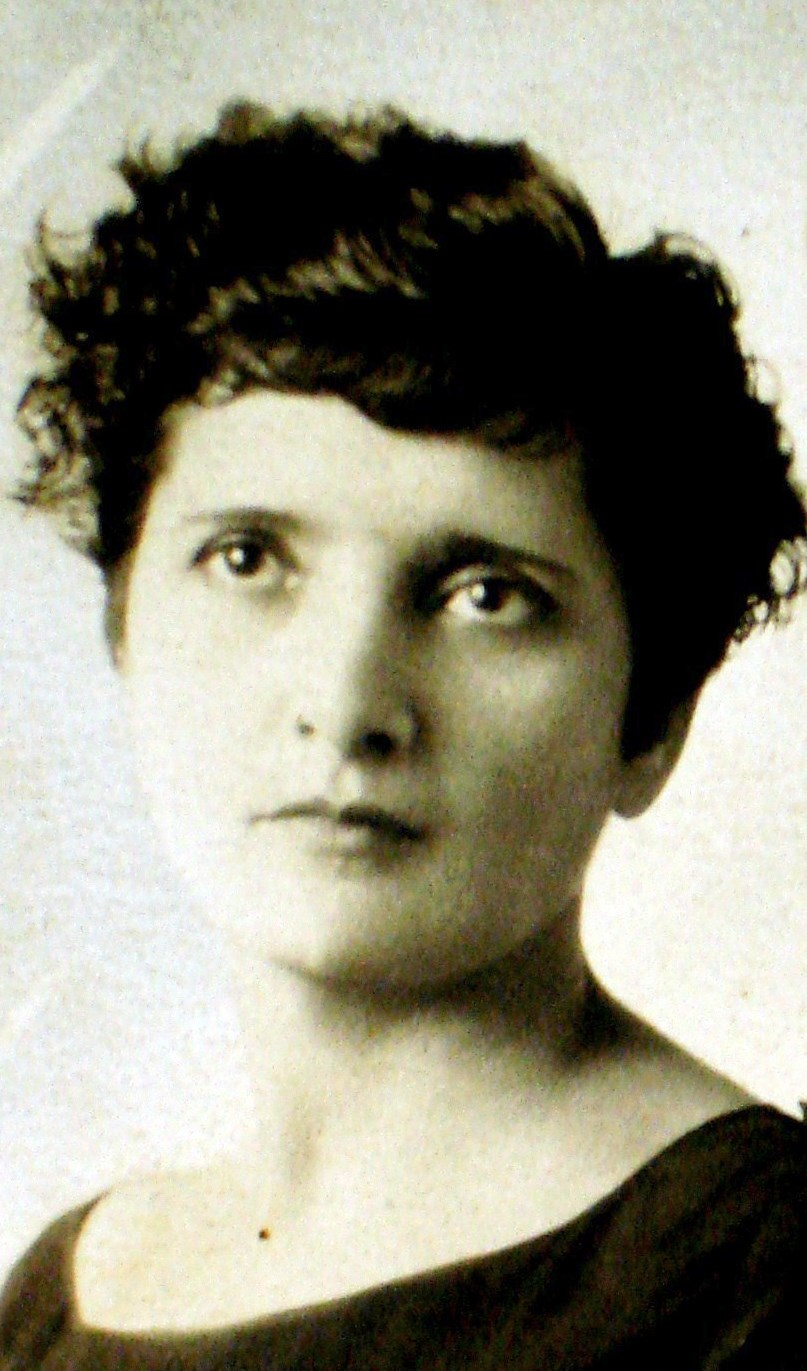
Elvia Carrillo Puerto, who organized the three National Congresses of Women Workers and Peasants in 1931, 1933, and 1934

Carrillo organized the first National Congress of Women Workers and Peasants, which took place in October 1931. The congress, which was held at the Alvaro Obregón Civic Center in Mexico City, was attended by delegates from 12 states and 10 different activist organizations. Delegates included both communists and members of the PNR. These groups took different approaches to women's organizing, with the communists, led by María del Refugio García, focusing primarily on female laborers and peasants and arguing for women's integration into labor and peasant organizations. In contrast, the members of the PNR, led by Florinda Lazos León, advocated for separate women's organizations, focusing primarily on women's suffrage. These differences led to conflict between the two groups, culminating in the arrest of 15 communist delegates after they shouted "subversive" slogans at President Pascual Ortiz Rubio, who was present at the congress. According to the a newspaper published by the Mexican Communist Party (Spanish: Partido Comunista Mexicano, PCM), the delegates sang revolutionary hymns and shouted chants in support of the Communist Party, the Soviet Union, workers, and "poor people in general". Ultimately, the congress approved the creation of a Mexican Women's Confederation, which would unite various women's interest groups.

A second national congress, again organized by Carrillo, took place in November 1933. The conflict between communists and members of the PNR continued at this congress. After a vote to establish a "permanent commission"—tasked with implementing the congress's resolutions and organizing future congresses—the PNR faction withdrew, accusing the communists of engaging in voter fraud. Further conflict between the two factions occurred at the Congress against Prostitution in June 1934, leading to the creation of two separate commissions. A third congress was eventually held in September 1934. Also organized by Carrillo and inaugurated by President-elect Lázaro Cárdenas, this congress featured members of both commissions and ultimately resulted in the creation of another new commission, this time featuring members of both factions.

== Founding and organization ==
Political Platform of the FUPDM

1. Struggle against the high cost of basic necessities;
2. Against deductions to women's wages and salaries;
3. For an increase to women's wages and salaries;
4. For the 8-hour workday;
5. For Social Security at the expense of the government and businesses, and the civil service law;
6. Against the high taxes levied on poor women in stores, shops, and markets;
7. For the reduction of rent on houses;
8. For the social and political equality of indigenous peoples and peasants;
9. Against all monopolies, whether national or foreign;
10. For the liberation of Mexico from imperial oppression, particularly Yankee imperialism;
11. For the open struggle against all foreign corporations;
12. Against the intervention of the northern American government or the banks in Mexico's internal affairs;
13. Against treaties humiliating Mexico and distributing land to foreigners;
14. For schools, books, and school supplies for the children of workers at the expense of the foreign companies where they work;
15. For maternity homes for the workers' wives at the expense of the foreign companies where their husbands work;
16. For the reduction of electricity and utility rates;
17. Against the payment of the foreign debt;
18. Against fascism and imperialist war;
19. For broad voting rights for women

— El Universal, 29 August 1935, quoted in "El Frente Único pro Derechos de la Mujer Durante el Cardenismo" [The Sole Front for Women's Rights During the Cardenista Period] by Esperanza Tuñón Pablos (Note: The platform was presented in the source without line breaks. They have been added here to increase legibility.)

Politically, Cárdenas advocated for government-sponsored "mass organizing". This approach was eventually accepted by Mexican communists after the 7th World Congress of the Comintern called for a united front against fascism. Members of both the PNR and the communist factions that emerged from the national congresses began calling for a united women's organization. As a result, the Sole Front for Women's Rights (Spanish: Frente Único Pro Derechos de la Mujer, FUPDM) was founded on 18 August 1935, uniting numerous women's groups (Note: 25 according to Peniche Rivero and Tuñón, 30 according to Sauri.) into a single organization. These organizations included Women's Civic Action and the Union of American Women (Spanish: Unión de Mujeres Americanas, UMA), an international coalition of Latin American women founded in 1934 that itself included Carrillo's Women's Action Guiding League, the National Feminist League, and the United Front of Mexican Women.

García served as the national organization's secretary-general. Its political platform incorporated demands from various women's organizations, both regional and pertaining to different segments of society. Only six of the platform's 19 demands pertained directly to women's rights, whereas others were more broad. During the second half of the 1930s, the FUPDM became the dominant feminist organization in Mexico. Headquartered in Mexico City, it sent organizers throughout the country to establish local branches. It also established relationships with international communist and feminist organizations, as well as with the League of Nations and the Organization of American States.

== Organizational activity ==
=== 1935–1936 ===
In 1935, the year of its founding, the FUPDM condemned the Italian invasion of Ethiopia and provided support for the National Committee for Proletarian Defense, a Cárdenas-aligned labor organization that had also been formed that year from the merger of several prominent trade unions. In 1936, many local branches were founded, each addressing its own problems. Branches in Veracruz advocated for lower food and fuel prices. The branch in José Azueta requested that the Cárdenas administration enforce minimum wage laws for women working as household cooks, as well as provide financial support for the establishment of a labor cooperative for domestic workers. Meanwhile, the branch in Uruapan, Michoacán, called for the establishment of a residential child care community, a women's cultural center, and an institute for the "regeneration" (Note: Many reformers in post-revolutionary Mexico sought to enact "social regeneration", advocating for progressivism, personal redemption, and the ordering of society around scientific ideals. One example of an organization pursuing regenerative reforms was the Juvenile Offenders Court of Mexico City, which targeted minors who participated in sex work in order to "prepare them for full participation in a revolutionary society", according to researcher Katherine E. Bliss. These minors were singled out for study by a range of experts, including child development specialists, criminologists, doctors, psychiatrists, and social workers.) of sex workers. The national organization established the National Women's Suffrage Council on 8 March 1936: International Women's Day.

=== 1937–1938 ===
According to academic Esperanza Tuñón Pablos, the Senate of the Republic voted against women's suffrage on 7 March 1937, arguing that "Mexican women [we]re not yet capable of exercising political rights". Meanwhile, historian Jocelyn Olcott claims that the Senate "released a report" opposing women's suffrage on 8 March. In either case, the FUPDM organized protests against the ruling, distributing flyers throughout the city and holding events at the Palacio de Bellas Artes (transl. 'Palace of Fine Arts') in Mexico City. They also provided support for García, who ran as a deputy in Uruapan, and Soledad Orozco, who ran as a local representative in León, Guanajuato. Both candidates won the popular vote in their respective jurisdictions during the PNR's primary elections, but the party refused to recognize their victories. (Note: Cano claims that Orozco was eventually able to convince the PNR to approve her nomination and that García ran as an independent in the general election, but does not provide any further information.) In response, the FUPDM led a hunger strike in front of Los Pinos, the presidential palace of Mexico, seeking a declaration of women's suffrage from Cárdenas. Cárdenas subsequently submitted a bill to the Congress of the Union to modify article 34, proposing a new definition of citizenship that included "all Mexican men and women over eighteen if they are married and over twenty-one if they are not". The FUPDM campaigned heavily for the bill in the ensuing years. The bill passed both houses of the Congress of the Union in 1939. However, because it was not recorded in the Official Journal of the Federation, it was never enacted.

The FUPDM's coalition began to fracture in 1937. One faction, which represented the majority of members, viewed the demand for women's suffrage as indispensable. The other favored the ideas put forward by Juana Belén Gutiérrez de Mendoza in her work La República Femenina (transl. 'The Feminine Republic'). (Note: In La República Femenina, Gutiérrez argues against women's suffrage on the basis that it would not be "an effective means of selection for the successful appointment of public officials", that it would obscure the will of the people, and that it could be exploited as a tool for obstruction or as a partisan weapon wielded by women acting under external control. Instead, Gutiérrez favored the abolition of men's institutions, which she viewed as conservative and patriarchal, and the reorganization of society around values of life and creativity.) This group formed the Women's Revolutionary Institute, which included Carrillo, Aurora Reyes Flores, and Concha Michel. Building on Gutiérrez's work, they proposed the creation of a classless society achieved through the elimination of patriarchy and the restoration of a "natural balance" in which the activities of different sexes are organized based on their distinct yet complementary roles. This drew opposition from both communist- and PNR-aligned members of the FUPDM, who characterized the position of the group as "anti-male" and argued that feminist movements were most effective when they worked alongside men.

In February 1938, President Cárdenas proposed that the women of the FUPDM be integrated into the newly renamed Party of the Mexican Revolution (Spanish: Partido de la Revolución Mexicana, PRM) as a "vital sector". The FUPDM held the Women's Unification Conference to discuss the proposal. Attendees ultimately concluded that unification with the PRM was of "utmost importance", per an article in El Machete published on 19 February 1938. This led to the fragmentation of the FUPDM into smaller interest groups for workers, peasants, the military, and other sectors. Some FUPDM members criticized the move, with Adelina Zendejas arguing that women were split into separate sectors as a way to divide and control them, with women's leaders advocating "only for those in their little chapel".

== Legacy and historiography ==
Various sources have discussed the legacy of the FUPDM on women's organizing in Mexico, with a report published by the Mexican government calling it "the most important women's suffrage organization in Mexico during the second half of the 1930s". Tuñón Pablos argues that while the women's movement showed significant potential during the Cárdenas administration, its close relationship with dominant political structures, particularly the PRM, ultimately led to its decline in the 1940s after the FUPDM's dissolution. She also argues that internal party control and purges within the PCM further weakened women's organizing, despite their initial efforts to influence the government of Manuel Ávila Camacho, who became president in 1940. Similarly, Olcott argues that the PCM's alignment with the PRM, which forced the former members of the FUPDM to follow suit, ultimately marginalized women within the Mexican left despite the creation of several new women's organizations during the early 1940s. Meanwhile, academic Stephanie Mitchell argues that the congressional campaigns launched by the FUPDM challenged the masculine construction of political power and that the FUPDM strategically leveraged García's political maneuvering to pressure the Cárdenas administration to take action on women's rights. However, like Tuñón and Olcott, she concludes that the PRM's inherent contradictions, prioritizing stability over pluralism, thwarted their efforts. Ultimately, women did not gain the right to vote in Mexico until 1953.

== Sources ==
- Aguilar Pérez, Jeniffer Mercedes (2010). "Un grito de amor. Congreso de obreras y campesinas en 1931" [A Cry of Love. The Congress of Women Workers and Peasants in 1931]. Versión (in Spanish). 25: 129–150.
- Bliss, Katherine Elaine (2002). Compromised Positions: Prostitution, Public Health, and Gender Politics in Revolutionary Mexico City. University Park: The Pennsylvania State University Press. ISBN 0-271-02125-X. ISSN 2007-5758.
- Buck, Sarah A. (2007). "The Meaning of the Women's Vote in Mexico". In Mitchell, Stephanie E.; Schell, Patience A. (eds.). The Women's Revolution in Mexico, 1910-1953. Lanham: Rowman & Littlefield. pp. 73–98. ISBN 978-0-7425-3730-9.
- Cano, Gabriela (1991). "Las feministas en campaña: la primera mitad del siglo XX" [Campaigning feminists: the first half of the 20th century]. Debate Feminista (in Spanish). 4: 269–292. doi:10.22201/cieg.2594066xe.1991.4.1536 (inactive 27 August 2025). ISSN 2594-066X.
- Cano, Gabriela (2019). "Mexico: The Long Road to Women's Suffrage". In Franceschet, Susan; Krook, Mona Lena; Tan, Netina (eds.). The Palgrave Handbook of Women's Political Rights. London: Palgrave Macmillan. pp. 115–128. doi:10.1057/978-1-137-59074-9_8. ISBN 978-1-137-59073-2.
- Celorio, Marcela; Carrera, Felipe (2021). "Mexico's Feminist Foreign Policy: Beyond Declarations and Good Intentions". Revista Mexicana de Política Exterior. 120: 59–75. ISSN 2594-2441.
- "FUPDM, mujeres en lucha por el derecho a votar (1935–1940)" [FUPDM, women fighting for the right to vote (1935–1940)] (PDF). El Mirador (in Spanish). Gobierno de México.
- Galindo Stevenson, Guadalupe Montserrath (2024). Educación y Revolución en las Ideas de Juana Belén Gutiérrez de Mendoza [Education and Revolution in the Ideas of Juana Belén Gutiérrez de Mendoza] (PDF) (Bachelor's thesis) (in Spanish). Mexico City: National Autonomous University of Mexico.
- Jaiven, Ana Lau. "Margarita Robles Díaz de Mendoza. Una sufragista igualitaria (1896-1954)". Cartografía del pensamiento social de las mujeres (in Spanish). El Colegio Mexiquense.
- Kloppe-Santamaría, Gemma (2021). "Violence in Postrevolutionary Mexico". Oxford Research Encyclopedia of Latin American History. Oxford University Press. doi:10.1093/acrefore/9780199366439.013.859. ISBN 978-0-19-936643-9.
- León, Samuel (1978). "El comité nacional de defensa proletaria" [The National Committee for Proletarian Defense]. Revista Mexicana de Sociología (in Spanish). 40 (2): 729–762. doi:10.2307/3539729. ISSN 0035-0087. JSTOR 3539729.
- Mitchell, Stephanie (2015). "Revolutionary Feminism, Revolutionary Politics: Suffrage under Cardenismo". The Americas. 72 (3): 439–46. doi:10.1017/tam.2015.33. ISSN 0003-1615. JSTOR 43897317.
- Olcott, Jocelyn (2005). Revolutionary Women in Postrevolutionary Mexico. Durham; London: Duke University Press. ISBN 9780822336532.
- Peniche Rivero, Piedad (2011). "Elvia Carrillo Puerto, su vida, sus tiempos y sus relaciones peligrosas con los caudillos de la Revolución Mexicana" [Elvia Carrillo Puerto, her life, her times, and her dangerous relationships with the leaders of the Mexican Revolution]. Boletín del Archivo General de la Nación (in Spanish). 7 (9): 85–104. ISSN 0185-1926.
- Sauri Riancho, Dulce María (2021). Elvia Carrillo Puerto: Violencia política y resiliencia [Elvia Carrillo Puerto: Political Violence and Resilience] (PDF) (in Spanish). Mexico City: Cámara de Diputados. ISBN 978-607-8812-10-3.
- Tuñón Pablos, Esperanza (2011). "El Frente Único pro Derechos de la Mujer Durante el Cardenismo" [The Sole Front for Women's Rights During the Cardenista Period]. In Espinosa Damián, Gisela; Jaiven, Ana Lau (eds.). Un fantasma recorre el siglo: Luchas feministas en México 1910-2010 [A ghost haunts the century: feminist struggles in Mexico 1910-2010] (in Spanish). Mexico City: Universidad Autónoma Metropolitana. pp. 95–124. ISBN 978-607-7957-14-0.
