= 1 May 2015 Jalisco attacks =

Series of attacks carried out by the Jalisco New Generation Cartel

- Part of Mexican drug war
- State of Jalisco in Mexico
- Date: 1 May 2015; 6:30 a.m. – 6:00 p.m. (approximately)
- Location: Jalisco (most attacks); some parts of Colima, Nayarit, Michoacán, and Guanajuato (in western Mexico)
- Caused by: Attempted capture of Nemesio Oseguera Cervantes (alias "El Mencho")
- Result: Jalisco New Generation Cartel Victory: Failed attempt to Capture Nemesio Oseguera Cervantes

Parties
Mexico: Mexican Armed Forces; Mexican Federal Police	Jalisco New Generation Cartel

Lead figures
(Mexico) Monte Alejandro Rubido García	Nemesio Oseguera Cervantes

Number
≈10,000	≈250

Casualties and losses
10 (9 in helicopter attack; 1 in other clashes)	8 (0 in helicopter attack; 8 in other clashes)

On 1 May 2015, the Jalisco New Generation Cartel (CJNG) carried out a series of attacks in Jalisco, Mexico, and four adjacent states to prevent the capture of Nemesio Oseguera Cervantes (alias "El Mencho"), their suspected leader. The operation began early that morning in Villa Purificación, where four Mexican Air Force and Federal Police (PF) helicopters spotted a CJNG convoy protecting El Mencho. As one of the helicopters flew over the convoy, the CJNG members shot it down using rocket-propelled grenade (RPG) launchers. Nine law enforcement officers died as a result of the attack, and multiple others were wounded. This was the first incident in the Mexican drug war in which organized crime groups shot down an aircraft.

As the government extended its crackdown on the CJNG, it issued its highest security alert level and coordinated municipal, state, and federal security forces. The CJNG responded to the offensive by hijacking 39 buses, trucks, and cars throughout western Mexico, setting them on fire, and using them to block roads and highways in multiple locations. They also burned several gas stations, banks, and businesses. Most of the attacks took place in Guadalajara, Jalisco's capital and the second-largest urban area in Mexico. According to the government, the scale and level of coordination by the CJNG in this attack had not been displayed by other crime groups in Mexico.

The attacks garnered international headlines and reactions from the highest levels of the Mexican government, including President Enrique Peña Nieto, who promised the dismantling of the CJNG's leadership structure. Mexico's National Security Commission placed significant attention on El Mencho, and publicly announced that they were making his arrest a priority. Over the course of a year, violence and homicides increased in Jalisco. However, as the government shifted its attention in 2016 to re-apprehend Joaquín "El Chapo" Guzmán, once Mexico's most-wanted drug lord, the CJNG readjusted its strategy and toned down its violent methods.

== Background and possible motives ==
According to the Mexican government, the attacks were one of the most brazen moves by organized crime against Mexican security forces in the ongoing Mexican drug war (2006–present). They were also unique in that a relatively new criminal group in Mexico like the CJNG was willing to confront the government head on. Though organized crime groups in Mexico had used rocket launchers against security forces in the past, it was the first time that one had shot down a military aircraft. This showed the Mexican government that the CJNG had the manpower and operational capacity to respond to government crackdowns.

The CJNG's influence in Mexico's criminal landscape had grown significantly since 2009–2010. The group was formed as a splinter organization of the Milenio and Sinaloa Cartels after several of their leaders were arrested or killed. Their international drug trafficking operations, specifically for heroin and methamphetamine, increased the group's financial power and capacity. Their market share growth in Mexican territory was also correlated with the arrest and deaths of the leaders of rival criminal groups like the Knights Templar Cartel and Los Zetas. The CJNG's stronghold, Jalisco, gave the group a strategic advantage since Jalisco ranks high in industrial output and gross domestic product (GDP).

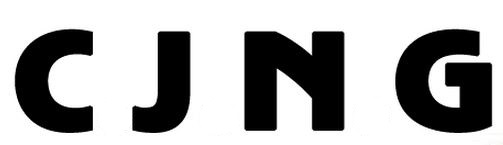
Logo with the Spanish acronym of the Jalisco New Generation Cartel (CJNG), the criminal group responsible for the attacks

The attack was covered in international media, prompting reactions at the highest levels of the Mexican government. President Enrique Peña Nieto told the public that day through his Twitter account that the CJNG would be dismantled by the government. Mexico's security commissioner Monte Alejandro Rubido García (es) told reporters in an interview after the helicopter attack that the government would spend significant resources to capture Nemesio Oseguera Cervantes (alias "El Mencho"), the top leader of the CJNG. The government's urgency to confront the CJNG had intensified the month before, when the CJNG ambushed and killed 15 policemen in Jalisco. The same day the attacks occurred, the government inaugurated Operation Jalisco, a military-led campaign to combat organized crime groups in Jalisco and capture their leaders. The new security operation was made up of the Army, the PF, the Attorney General's Office (PGR), and the Center for Research and National Security (CISEN), Mexico's national intelligence agency. The main target of the operation was the CJNG. Around 10,000 new troops and 300 armored vehicles were dispatched to the state for Operation Jalisco on 10 and 11 May.

The helicopter attack and the roadblocks were a response by the CJNG to the attempted capture of El Mencho. (Note: Other minor accounts stated that the attacks stemmed from the arrest of a CJNG leader in Puerto Vallarta, Jalisco (most likely in reference to Abigael González Valencia).) The government stated that the violence in Jalisco was a reaction to Operation Jalisco. According to sources from the PF, prior to the helicopter attack, El Mencho was spotted in Tonaya, Jalisco, which prompted a law enforcement offensive to apprehend him. His gunmen defended him from the PF and he was able to escape. The helicopter that was shot down was equipped with parachutes that were intended to be used by the officers on board. They were planning to jump off and continue their operation on foot with the goal of capturing El Mencho. (Note: Federal sources stated that they believe a high-ranking member of the CJNG was in the convoy that attacked the helicopter. They did not specify if they suspected this individual was El Mencho.) Unconfirmed federal and state sources said that someone within law enforcement notified the CJNG of the surprise operation. They said the government confirmed this through wiretapping. The sources stated that the CJNG had detected unusual law enforcement activity in the area where El Mencho was hiding, but they did not have clear information on the operative against him until it was leaked by an insider. When the roadblocks occurred, rumors circulated that El Mencho was arrested by security forces. Law enforcement confirmed that they were close to capturing El Mencho, (Note: According to government sources, El Mencho has an inner circle made up of former ex-commandos who are responsible for protecting him. His second security circle is made up of approximately 120 people, and this circle's purpose is to carry out ambushes against forces attempting to get close to El Mencho.) but did not confirm him among the detainees arrested that day. (Note: Other media outlets stated that El Mencho and his son Rubén Oseguera González (alias "El Menchito") were arrested that day. There were also rumors that stated that they were possibly killed in the attacks. In particular, the rumors of El Mencho's arrest circulated among Jalisco officials. The then-candidate for the governorship of Colima, José Ignacio Peralta Sánchez, gave an official statement online on 1 May claiming El Mencho was arrested. He later removed his claim after the information turned out to be false.) The government considers El Mencho the main suspect and mastermind of the 1 May attacks.

== Helicopter attack ==
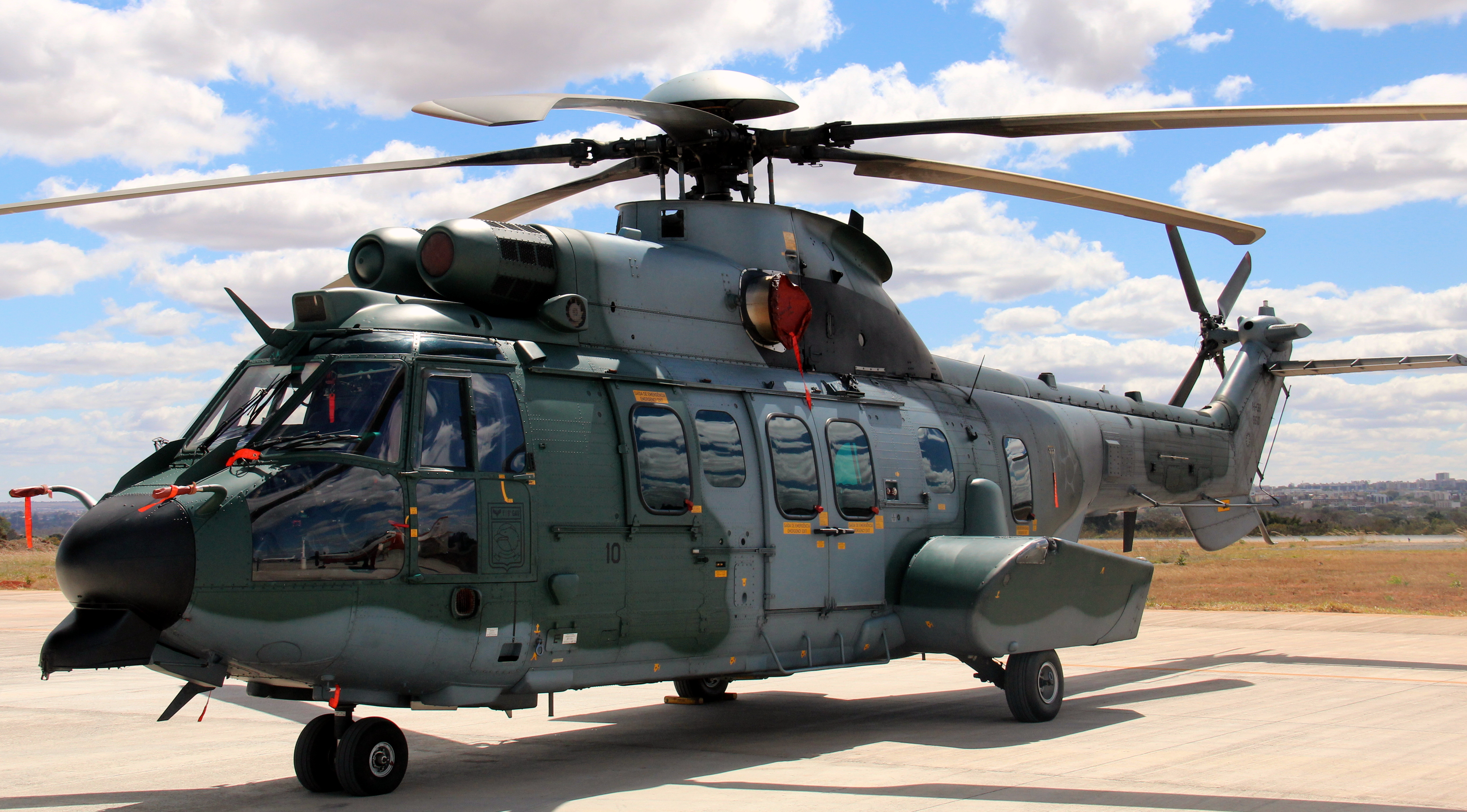
A Cougar EC725 of the Brazilian Air Force, a similar model to the one in the attack

Before dawn at around 6:30 a.m. on 1 May 2015, an armed convoy from the CJNG made their way from Casimiro Castillo to Villa Purificación via dirt roads. The vehicles drove with their headlights off to avoid detection by the Mexican Air Force and the Federal Police (PF), who were doing air surveillance of the area in four helicopters. One of the vehicles was equipped with rocket-propelled grenade (RPG) launchers. (Note: According to Mexican security forces, the RPGs used by the CJNG were low cost (MXN$10,000) and user friendly, and did not require advanced training for proper usage. However, they did state that precision aiming may require advanced shooting skills.) As the helicopters flew over the convoy, (Note: One source said that the helicopter made an announcement to the CJNG convoy to stop, and that the gunmen responded to the warning by shooting at the helicopter.) the CJNG units opened fire. One of the helicopters, a Cougar EC725 carrying eighteen passengers, (Note: The other helicopters at the scene were a Bell 412 and two Black Hawks.) was hit on its tail with a Russian-made RPG-27 rocket launcher. (Note: Another source stated that they used two different rocket launchers, the RPG-22 and RPG-7.) Once hit, the helicopter spun several times in the air as it tried to maneuver its way back into trajectory. It then fell at a distance from where it was struck and exploded. (Note: Preliminary reports by the government stated that the helicopter was hit and was forced to conduct an emergency landing. Smoke from the attack was visible two days later.) The assailants fired six rockets at the helicopter and hit it twice; the gunmen tried shooting down another helicopter, but missed. The CJNG gunmen then attempted to execute any remaining living passengers. However, military reinforcements in the air prevented the gunmen from getting close to the collision scene and forced them to retreat. (Note: According to local residents, the gunfight between the helicopter units and the CJNG convoy lasted approximately two hours.) Nine passengers were killed as a result of the airstrike: eight from the Mexican Army and one from the PF. Some of the soldiers killed were part of the Cuerpo de Fuerzas Especiales, the elite special forces unit of the Army. The other passengers were taken to the Regional Military Hospitals in Guadalajara to receive medical attention. (Note: Guadalajara is 240 kilometres (150 mi) away from Casimiro Castillo–Villa Purificación, where the attack took place. Guadalajara is the capital city of Jalisco and Mexico's second-largest urban area.) Their health conditions were not made public.

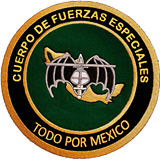
Logo of the Cuerpo de Fuerzas Especiales, the elite Army branch involved in the attack

The day of the attack, the Mexican government confirmed that three military men were killed and three Army soldiers were missing, while the remaining twelve passengers (ten from the Army and two from the PF) were recorded as wounded. During the first 24 hours, their search was contained in a 100 metres (330 ft) radius, but investigators widened the search area when the missing men were not found. (Note: At that time, the government stated that they did not know if the missing soldiers were hiding, abducted, or injured.) On 4 May, the government confirmed that it had located the victims of the attack. They had to identify their corpses by conducting DNA tests as the bodies has been torn into pieces from the helicopter's explosion. This increased the death toll to six. On 6 May, the seventh passenger from the Army died of cardiac arrest as a result of the wounds he suffered from the helicopter's fall. The following day, one of the PF passengers died from his wounds. On 10 May, the ninth and final victim of the attack, a soldier from the Army, died at a hospital. Authorities confirmed that four other passengers had been discharged from the hospital after treatment. Five more remained in the hospital receiving medical attention.

Following the helicopter attack, the PF and military personnel cordoned the area and conducted a thorough search of the premises. They initially discovered four abandoned vehicles that they suspected were owned by the perpetrators. In the vehicles, investigators discovered military uniforms with the insignia "CJNG Special Forces High Command" with five embedded stars. (Note: According to anonymous federal sources, the CJNG members who were involved in the helicopter attack were high-ranking mercenaries who were once part of the Mexican Armed Forces. Given their experience in combat and training, they were believed to be assigned as part of the inner circle of Nemesio Oseguera Cervantes (alias "El Mencho"), the suspected CJNG leader who they were reportedly protecting that day.) No immediate arrests were made. The Army seized 15 assault rifles, 6 handguns, 2 RPG launchers, 2 LAW rocket launchers, 10 rocket launcher missiles, 5 hand grenades, 92 magazines for multiple weapons, and 3,800 cartridges of different weapon calibers. Possession of several of the above weapons was illegal under Mexican law. Authorities also seized radio communication equipment, several bullet-proof vests, and nine vehicles. One of the vehicles was equipped with tools to carry a RPG launcher. Investigators handed these items over to the SEIDO, Mexico's anti-organized crime investigatory agency. At the helicopter collision scene, several Army soldiers made a cross with wires and tied it to a tree close to where their comrades died. The cross had the logo of the special forces unit.

The smoke from the helicopter's crash lasted a few hours, and several of the helicopter's pieces scattered as far as 250 metres (820 ft) from each other. About 24 hours after the crash, the Army reached the crash site and cordoned off the area to allow investigators to collect forensic evidence. Soldiers established checkpoints around Villa Purificación and searched vehicles leaving and entering the town. Other Army units patrolled the streets of the town and nearby highways in search of the suspects. Besides Villa Purificación, which had the largest military presence, there were also significant numbers of soldiers in Autlán and Unión de Tula.

== Roadblocks and arsons ==
Location of Guadalajara and its surrounding metropolitan area within Jalisco

As the government deployed throughout Jalisco to crack down on the CJNG's offensive, violence erupted in 25 of its municipalities and in four surrounding states: Colima, Nayarit, Michoacán, and Guanajuato. In these areas, the CJNG hijacked 39 vehicles and established roadblocks using cars, trucks, and transportation buses. (Note: The official count for the number of roadblocks is 39. Other sources had the figure between 54 and 80.) Thirty-six of the 39 hijacked vehicles were set on fire by the CJNG. According to eyewitnesses, the CJNG obtained the vehicles by pointing their weapons at drivers on the road and forcing them to a complete stop. They would then hijack the vehicles, spray them with gasoline on the inside, and set them on fire. Setting up roadblocks is a common tactic of the CJNG and other organized crime groups in Mexico; the CJNG had used roadblocks on a large scale at least three times since 2012 in an apparent attempt to create confusion after strategic arrests. Their purpose is to halt the mobility of security forces on the road and prevent them from making arrests. However, the attacks of 1 May surpassed the previous attacks in terms of magnitude and coordination. According to reports from the National Security Commission (CNS) (es), approximately 250 CJNG members participated in the attacks in an organized way; an unprecedented level of coordination. In addition to burning vehicles and setting up numerous blockades, the CJNG also burned several banks, gas stations, and businesses across western Mexico. (Note: According to the government, 5 gas stations suffered damages, while 14 additional ones had been set on fire but were contained without considerable damages. Eleven bank branches and two businesses were set on fire. As a result of the attacks, gasoline stations in Jalisco, Colima, and Nayarit cancelled services until authorities restored order.)

Thousands of people were left stranded across major highways and streets since they were unable to get to their destinations because of the attacks. The roads in Guadalajara and the surrounding metropolitan area were the most affected by the attacks and roadblocks. Civilians posted videos and photos of the burning vehicles on social media, and government officials used this platform as well to update civilians and warn them of the risk situations. (Note: The roadblocks began around 10:00 am; several others were reported as late as 6:00 pm, though most in the inner cities were cleared by 1:00 pm.) The government asked civilians to avoid rumors on social media and only rely on official information. The severity of the attacks forced the Government of Jalisco to activate its "red code" alert, a designation used to warn citizens of risk situations across the state. This is the highest level in the alert system and is used when the state is considered to be under great danger. With the activation of the red alert, Governor Jorge Aristóteles Sandoval Díaz confirmed that municipal and state forces were coordinating efforts with the federal government. He told the public that he had informed President Enrique Peña Nieto of the attacks early in the day, and that the president had assigned Secretary of Interior Miguel Ángel Osorio Chong to communicate on his behalf.

By the end of the day, Jalisco and the surrounding states were restored to normality, but Jalisco authorities recommended that its citizens remain indoors if possible. The red alert lasted until 3 May, and the government issued a preventative security phase following the alert's cancellation. The government clarified that the coordinated efforts of all three levels of government continued uninterrupted despite the cancellation. Governor Sandoval Díaz denied that the additional federal forces in Jalisco meant that the state was being militarized. The government confirmed that in addition to the passengers killed in Villa Purificación, eight suspected CJNG members and a state police officer from Autlán were killed in other clashes stemming from the 1 May attacks. Several state and federal police officers were reported wounded in confrontations in Jalisco and other states.

The day of the attacks, the U.S. Consulate in Guadalajara issued multiple security warnings through its Facebook page and on its website. It reported that there were several blockades across Jalisco and Colima, and that there were vehicles, gas stations, banks, and other buildings set on fire during the attacks. It warned its employees in Jalisco about the attacks and blockades, and asked them to remain at home until the situation was resolved by law enforcement. The warning also extended to American tourists planning to visit Jalisco, imploring them to avoid visiting the area and to observe public announcements by the Mexican government. The consulate was closed for International Workers' Day (1 May), but was open on Monday, 4 May. The warning concluded by encouraging U.S. citizens traveling or living in Mexico to consult the alerts and warnings page at the website of the U.S. Department of State. The Canadian Embassy also warned Canadians to stay home and limit their outdoor activities.

== Reactions ==
=== Government ===
Logo with the Mexican Air Force, the military branch that suffered the attack

At 1 p.m. on 1 May, President Peña Nieto made an official announcement on social media regarding the helicopter attack. He stated that he lamented the death of the soldiers killed "in the line of duty," and thanked the courage of the federal forces in combating organized crime. The government confirmed that they were planning a ceremony to honor the servicemen killed in the attack. Osorio Chong also expressed his condolences through social media. In addition, several high-ranking officials in the Army and Air Force expressed their condolences to the families. In the following days, Peña Nieto met with the families of the helicopter attack victims in private. On 4 May, the government held a ceremony at Campo Marte in Mexico City, where Peña Nieto headed a flag ceremony with the Military Service volunteers. In his speech, he thanked the Mexican Armed Forces for "risking their lives" for working to maintain peace in Mexico, and stated that the attacks from organized crime only made the government's efforts stronger. He clarified that the government had arrested or killed in action most of Mexico's most-wanted criminals. Two days later, the President held another ceremony at the Campo Militar 1-F along with the special forces general Miguel Ángel Aguirre Lara. Peña Nieto offered his condolences to the family members and gave them a Mexican flag.

In an interview at the World Economic Forum in the Riviera Maya on 7 May, Sandoval Díaz stated that the attacks of 1 May were "acts of vandalism", not signs of narcoterrorism. He stated that the word "narcoterrorism" was not defined under Mexican law and thereby did not carry legal weight. He argued that the detainees arrested that day were under the influence of drugs and were paid between MXN$500 and MXN$1,000 to commit the attacks. When asked whether there was a leak of information from the police's side to the CJNG, he stated that he was not aware of any illegal intelligence sharing between law enforcement and organized crime. A reporter asked him whether the helicopter attack counted as vandalism too, and he clarified that that attack was different from the roadblocks and arson reported elsewhere in Jalisco. He also stated that it was not the government's intention to minimize the incidents of 1 May by not categorizing them as terrorist acts. Sandoval Díaz argued that the CJNG placed roadblocks to create chaos among the civil population and to slow law enforcement's mobility. He explained that the roadblocks forced security forces to divide their units to restore order and clear up the streets, allowing the CJNG members to escape. He attributed the root cause of the violence to the balkanization of organized crime groups in Jalisco and the nearby regions. His remarks, however, drew criticism after the media considered that the government was being dismissive of the severity of the attacks.

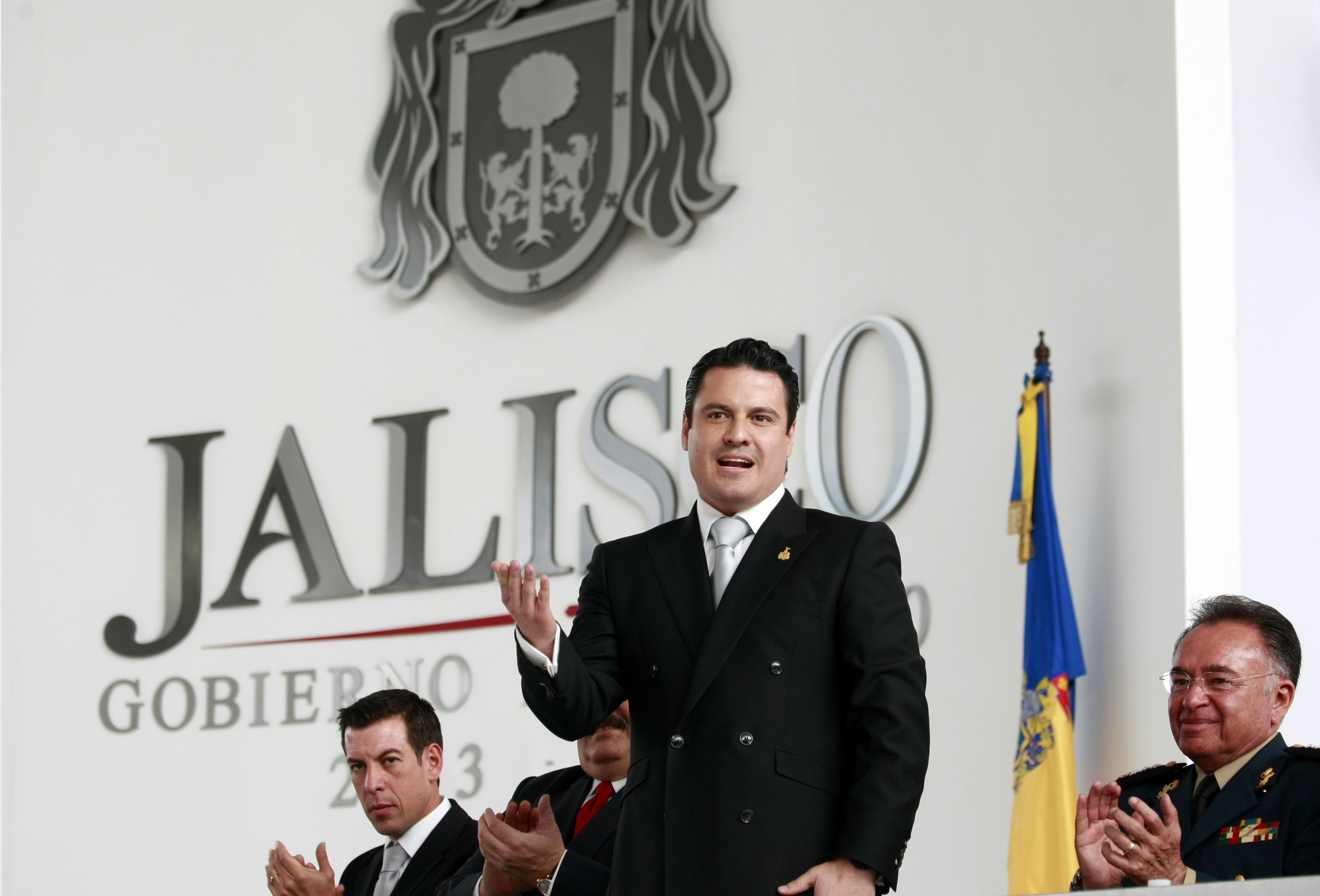
Jalisco Governor Jorge Aristóteles Sandoval Díaz in a press conference

On 8 May, suspected members of the CJNG put up a banner near a Los Niños Héroes monument in Autlán threatening federal forces stationed there. They gave an ultimatum saying that the forces had one month to leave the town before they would take action. "We will kill every soldier we see in the street," the banner read. The government took the threat seriously and reacted by tightening security in Autlán, the coastal region of Jalisco, and in the southern part of the state. The banner was supposedly signed by four suspected CJNG local leaders known by the aliases "El 24," "El 7," "Japo," and "Vaquero." These banners are commonly used by organized crime groups as propaganda.

On 10 May, federal forces revisited Villa Purificación, where the attack occurred, in several helicopters. They were accompanied by additional troops on the ground. On 11 May, Governor Sandoval Díaz held a meeting at El Grullo with several mayors from Región Costa Sur and Región Sierra de Amula (es), two regions in Jalisco. Among those present were Jalisco's secretary general Roberto López Lara and Army General Miguel Gustavo González Cruz, the head of Operation Jalisco. Outside of the building where they met, the police dispatched snipers on nearby roofs while the military mounted a checkpoint at the town's entrance. In the meeting, Sandóval Díaz told the mayors that the Jalisco State Police was taking over the municipal police forces' duties under the rationale that the local police was not equipped to deal with organized crime infiltration.

On 8 June, the Army issued a posthumous promotion to eight of its members who were killed in the helicopter attack. Among them were two Army infantry captains, an Air Force pilot, an Army infantry lieutenant, an Air Force sub-lieutenant, two-second-degree Army infantry sergeants, and another Air Force member. The promotion also included another military-police member killed in an unrelated incident in Tamaulipas. This action was signed and approved by Salvador Cienfuegos Zepeda, the head of the Secretariat of National Defense. The victims were granted this promotion because the government considered that their "exceptionally meritorious" service prior to their death showed that they were loyal to their duty. The purpose of the promotion was to provide moral and economical support to the victim's families, as well as to highlight the commitment of the troops. On 23 December, Peña Nieto awarded Iván Morales Corrales, one of the PF survivors, a medal for his heroism. Morales suffered burns on 70% of his body and nearly died from damage to his internal and external organs. The ceremony took place at the National Auditorium in Mexico City with over 10,000 PF members in attendance, in addition to the victim's family members.

=== Peaceful protests ===
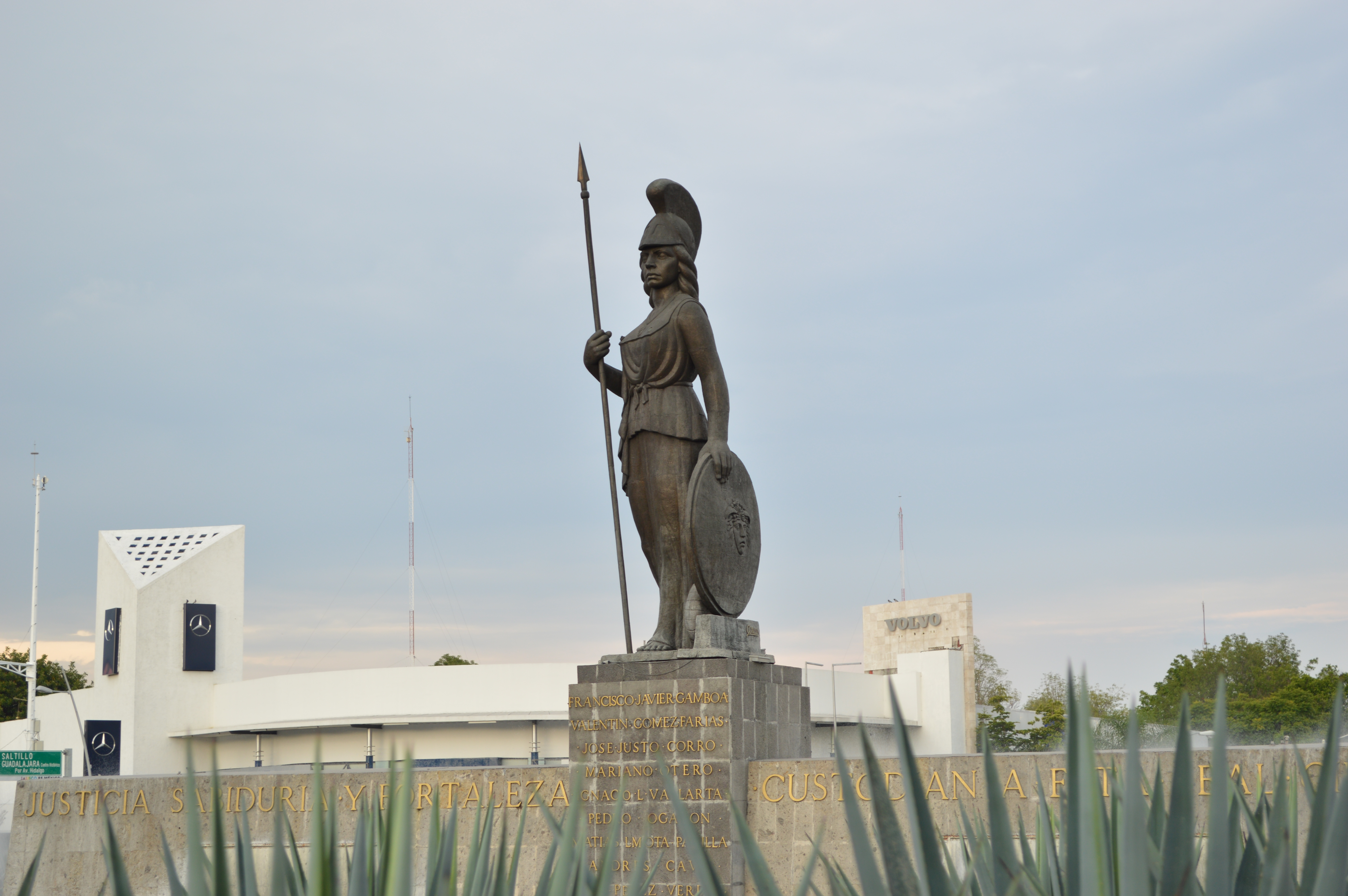
Statue of La Minerva in Guadalajara, where one of the protests took place

On 9 May, around 1,000 civilians in Guadalajara dressed in white and conducted a 3.2-kilometer (2.0 mi) silent march. The march started in the Providencia neighborhood in western Guadalajara and ended at La Minerva, one of the city's main monuments. It was organized online under the hashtag #CaminataPorLaPazGDL. (Note: There were other major hashtags, including #GDLUnida, #PazGDL, #PazMéxico, #RecuperemosGDL, #JaliscoEnPaz, and #JaliscoSinMiedo.) According to the march organizers, the purpose of the movement was to bring peace awareness in light of the incidents that occurred on 1 May. (Note: The march was also organized to protest the murder of Álvaro Chávez Ochoa, a Guadalajara marathon runner who was killed in Zapopan, Jalisco two days prior to the attacks.) They also asked citizens to self-reflect on their behavior in society and analyze what they have done to promote change. The organizers stated that they were not part of any belief system, foundation, political group, or organization. Several celebrities from Guadalajara promoted the march through social media. (Note: Among them were Mexican footballers Javier Hernández, Carlos Salcedo, Marco Fabián, and Aldo de Nigris, racing driver Sergio Pérez, singer Alejandro Fernández, golfer Lorena Ochoa, and actresses Galilea Montijo and Aleida Núñez.) The march included people from various age groups; entire families were also recorded in attendance. There were also several sports, business, and religious groups present. They were guarded by the Guadalajara Municipal Police, the Jalisco State Police, and the Civil Protection and Fire Brigade corporations. Once civilians reached La Minerva, they adorned it with flowers and candles. There were about 1,500 civilians by the end of the march. Several of the activists present spoke to the media and explained that they or their family members were victims of violence in Jalisco in the past. Others explained that they were marching because they were tired of the violent incidents in their home state. The movement ended after those present sang the Mexican National Anthem and played a video recording of a child who advocated honesty as a means for peace. "Peace starts in each and everyone one of us," was the final quote of the recording.

On 14 May, multiple civil organizations got together in Mexico City and announced their plan to organize another silent march for Jalisco in the city on 31 May. This announcement was made two days after the PGR confirmed that the CJNG operated in Mexico City. The groups responsible for organizing the event issued a declaration for why they were joining the cause. The declaration said that they repudiated the violence caused by the CJNG in Jalisco, and acknowledged that the attacks they carried out against the Mexican government on 1 May were serious and dangerous. They also expressed their solidarity with the families of the passengers killed in the helicopter attack, and stated their support of the Mexican Armed Forces in their combat against organized crime to restore peace in Jalisco and the rest of Mexico. Aside from supporting the government's cause, the organizers also asked federal and states authorities to fight impunity and corruption. On the day of the march, 300 civilians gathered at the Angel of Independence statue and started their march through Paseo de la Reforma and headed towards Campo Marte, where they ended their march at the newly inaugurated Memorial to Victims of Violence with a moment of silence for the passengers killed.

=== Continued violence ===
On 19 May 2015, rumors spread that the Army was involved in a shootout with suspected organized crime members in Villa Purificación. (Note: Another source confuses the date with 18 May 2015.) The death toll that circulated was eight civilians dead. The state government clarified that those killed were involved in the attacks of 1 May. According to accounts from several families from Villa Purificación, however, some of their relatives went missing after the 1 May attacks. They suspected that the eight civilians reported as "killed" that day were possibly related to this incident. According to their testimonies, the Army was involved in several shootouts with suspected organized crime members in their town after 1 May, resulting in dozens of locals killed. The families claimed that the Army took the corpses of the civilians killed—close to 40—and piled them in the wilderness for two weeks. One of the family members said she tried to go to the area where the bodies were reportedly located, but several soldiers prevented her from going any further and threatened to arrest her. The families said that their relatives were not involved with organized crime and had nothing to do with the 1 May attacks.

One of the family members told investigators that civilians in Villa Purificación were scared to reach out to the government for help because they feared reprisals from the Army. They said that they believe the Army summarily executed civilians out of rage for the incidents that occurred on 1 May in Villa Purificación. The families also said that the Army was not letting cattle ranchers give water to their livestock in order to kill them, and asked President Peña Nieto to intervene in the incidents. One of the family members who supposedly approached the military men guarding the bodies told the press that when he asked a soldier if she could get close to the bodies to see if any of them were her missing relative, the soldier told her that the relatives were not getting their bodies back and that they would let the corpses rot. She claimed that the soldier told her that they killed those people because they were responsible for the deaths of their comrades.

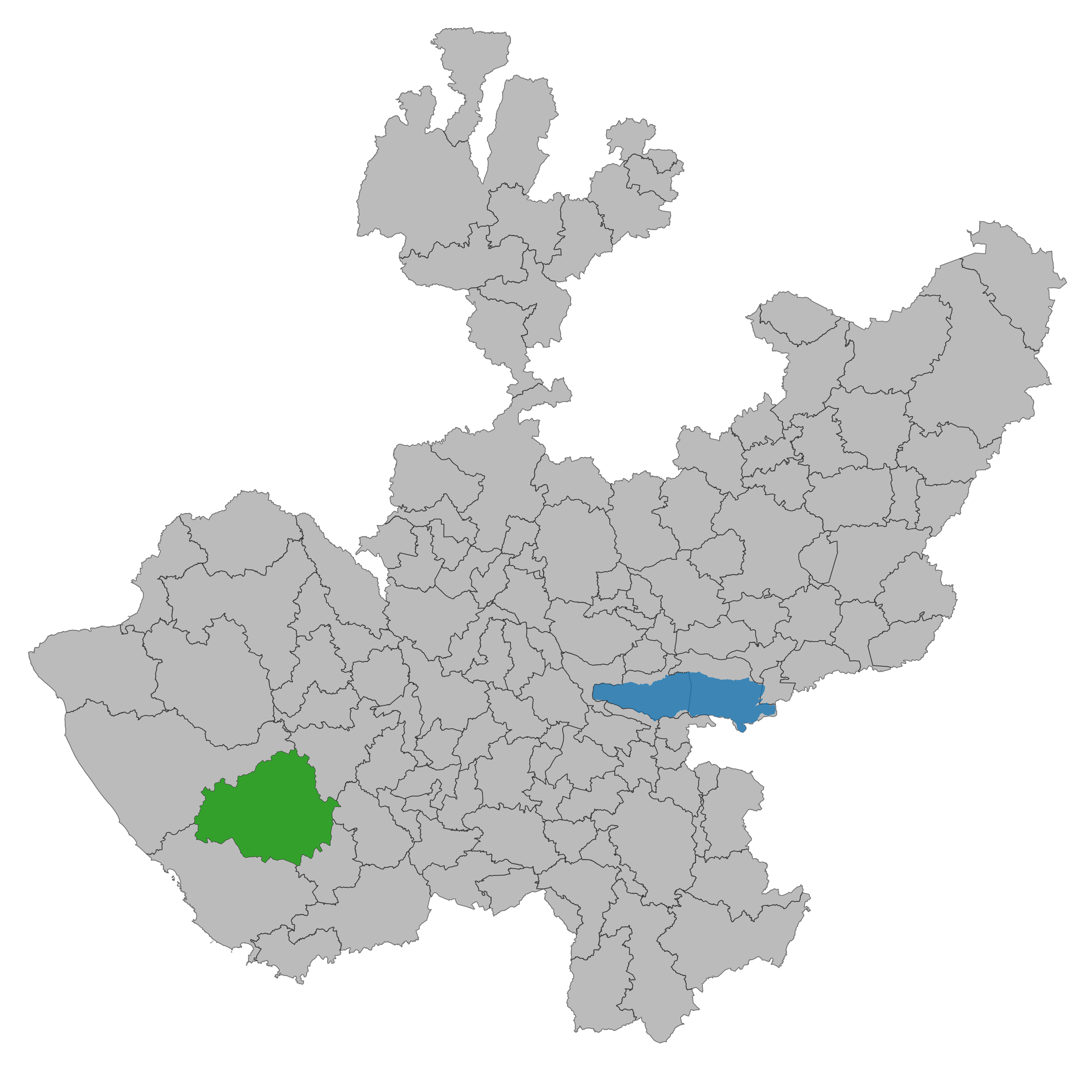
Location of Villa Purificación, Jalisco (in green), where the helicopter attack took place

This case was first reviewed by the PGR in Jalisco, and was then sent to the SEIDO in Mexico City as the agency responsible for investigating this case. The lawyer for the families criticized the government's decision to move the case to the SEIDO because it "victimized" them. He also stated that the families were poor and did not have the resources to go to Mexico City. The lawyer stated that the families went to the forensic medical services installations in Guadalajara to see several bodies the government had sent from Villa Purificación. Although they gave DNA samples at the PGR offices in Jalisco to see if any of the corpses at the morgue were relatives, investigators told them that they lacked legal jurisdiction and that the DNA results could only be given to them in Mexico City. The lawyer stated that there were verbal accounts that civilians in Villa Purificación were tortured and extrajudicially killed by security forces. He also questioned the government's delay in bringing the bodies to Guadalajara, since this gave investigators an excuse to not investigate the highly decomposed bodies. He also stated that it would be impossible for investigators to prove that those killed used any weapons on 1 May or were part of the CJNG.

On 21 May, the families attempted to put forward a writ of amparo and accused the government of violating their rights by putting up unnecessary barriers by forcing them to visit Mexico City to see the results of the DNA samples. On 24 May, the families pushed their case to Mexico's National Human Rights Commission (CNDH) to help them retrieve the DNA samples from the PGR in Jalisco. The CNDH told the lawyer that the families no longer had to go to Mexico City for the DNA samples and that they could do the procedures in Jalisco. The government was able to confirm the identity of three of the eight civilians killed. The government stated that their DNA samples matched those of the family members, but clarified that these people were killed in clashes with security forces on 1 May and not on 19 May. The families of Villa Purificación contested the government's final decision, and stated that between May and 19 May, dozens of people were killed in the town. They claimed that the Army safeguarded the morgues to prevent civilians from seeing the bodies and identifying them. On 22 May, the families of the missing people returned to Villa Purificación.

According to the Jalisco Institute of Forensic Sciences, a branch of the Government of Jalisco, violence between organized crime groups and security forces increased in Jalisco after 1 May. From that date to 25 April 2016, Jalisco registered 1,195 homicides. The year before the attacks, from 1 May 2014, to 30 April 2015, only 1,094 homicides were registered. This meant that violence in Jalisco increased nine percent in the year after the 1 May attacks. According to the state government, the increase in violence was a result of the arrests carried out by security forces against the criminal groups' leadership structures, as organized crime groups are destabilized and have to restructure – often violently – after their leaders are taken down. In 2016 alone, Jalisco recorded 1,152 homicides, compared to 1,017 in 2015. Of the 2016 homicides, 786 of them were done with firearms: 223 of them were recorded in Guadalajara, 123 in Zapopan, 94 in Tlajomulco de Zúñiga, 62 in Tlaquepaque, and the remaining figures in other municipalities. In addition, around 5,000 car thefts were reported in Jalisco that year.

== Investigation and crackdowns ==
Following the attacks of 1 May, the government arrested 19 people suspected of participating in the attacks. One of the suspects was injured after engaging in a gunfight with an officer from the Jalisco State Police, and was under arrest at the hospital. He was shot in the head after reportedly hijacking and setting a vehicle on fire. The officer who confronted him was injured in the thorax but was reported as stable. A few days later, the state government confirmed that the number of detainees was down to 11, which included one minor. The Jalisco Attorney General, Luis Carlos Nájera Gutiérrez de Velasco, confirmed that the eight other detainees were released after they were found not guilty. Of the 11 detainees, 6 were accused of terrorism and organized crime charges for participating in the car hijackings and arson. Four additional suspects were charged with the theft of oil for use in arson. On 6 May, the PGR formally charged five suspects for illegal possession of exclusively military firearms, attempted murder, and involvement in organized crime. The next day, a judge ordered the release of three suspects after concluding that they were arrested illegally and not given a right to counsel during their confessions. On 22 July, another suspect was arrested in Tlaquepaque for his suspected participation in the 1 May attacks.

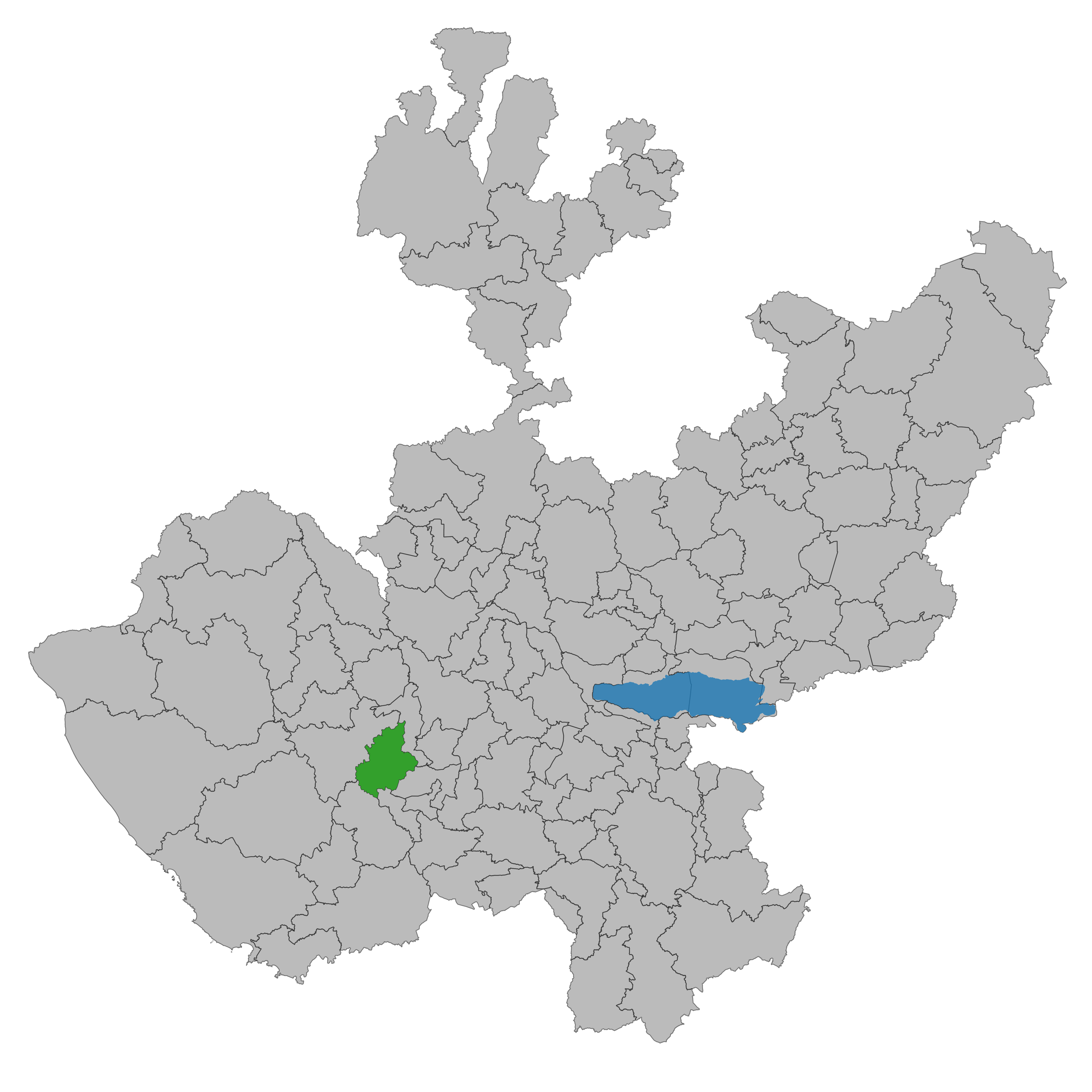
Location of Unión de Tula, Jalisco (in green), where the disarmament took place

On 15 May, the Government of Jalisco disarmed the municipal police forces of Villa Purificación and Unión de Tula. Villa Purificación had 19 police officers and one police chief, while Unión de Tula had 11 police officers and one police chief. All of them were ordered to appear in court. Legally, the state government has the power to disarm municipal forces because it has the right to grant and revoke licenses for bearing arms. Governor Sandoval explained that this non-violent procedure took three hours and was done in light of the measures proposed through Operation Jalisco and the attacks of 1 May. (Note: In Villa Purificación, civilians notified the state government that armed men from the CJNG were freely roaming around the town, a complaint that may have motivated the disarmament.) He also explained that the state government conducted a large-scale investigation and discovered that organized crime groups had infiltrated the police. (Note: Disarmament of municipal police forces is a common practice by security forces in the Mexican drug war since local authorities are believed to be more susceptible to corruption by criminal groups. In many cases, state and federal authorities do not make the job status of municipal authorities public after their forces have been disarmed.) Around 150 state officials were disarmed. Jalisco's security commissioner Francisco Alejandro Solorio Aréchiga informed the press that they retrieved 36 rifles (20 from Villa Purificación and 16 from Unión de Tula), 46 handguns (20 from Villa Purificación and 26 from Unión de Tula), and nine vehicles (four from Villa Purificación and five from Unión de Tula). In a communiqué, the state government explained that public security duties would fall under state and federal authorities.

On 18 November, federal authorities arrested Iván Cazarín Molina (alias "El Tanque") in Tlajomulco de Zúñiga for his alleged involvement in the helicopter attack. (Note: He was also known as Víctor Hugo Delgado Rentería.) At the building where he was arrested, authorities confiscated four assault rifles, three handguns, a package of cocaine, four vehicles, and radio communication equipment. According to PF chief Enrique Francisco Galindo Ceballos (es), El Tanque was a high-ranking leader of the CJNG and reported directly to El Mencho as the group's second-in-command following the arrest of El Mencho's son Rubén Oseguera González (alias "El Menchito"). The PF also suspected that his center of operations was in Guadalajara, where he used money laundering proceeds to further his criminal activities. They believed he was also responsible for drug trafficking, extorting businesses, leading oil theft rings, and homicides in Jalisco and Veracruz. Prior to his arrest, the PF carried out several covert operations over six months and eventually found their way to El Tanque's inner circle, where they discovered that he frequented a location that the CJNG used as one of its centers of operations and as a recreation spot. The police highlighted that no shots were fired in the operation, partly because El Tanque and his three accomplices were drinking alcohol and were not prepared to defend themselves when the police raided the building. (Note: The other detainees were Marco Antonio Rocha García, Rafael Ortega Aquino, and Yahir Martínez Mora.)

On 2 August 2018, the Mexican government arrested six people for their alleged participation in the helicopter attack and in the ambush in Ocotlán. The men were arrested at a ranch in Jalisco that was thought to be owned by the CJNG and used as a distribution hub. Renato Salas Heredia, the CNS commissioner, stated that investigators believed these men were part of the inner circle of the CJNG's leadership. Salas explained that these arrests were carried out as part of a PF effort known as Operation Escudo Titán. That same day, the PF also arrested eight CJNG members in Quintana Roo. Security forces considered both Jalisco and Quintana Roo as major hubs for the CJNG and hot spots of the Mexican drug war. Multiple vehicles and ammunition were confiscated at both crime scenes.

=== Aftermath ===
After the 1 May attacks, the Mexican government placed significant attention on El Mencho. In other violent events in the Mexican drug war, the government has swiftly responded against sensational acts of violence, often leading to the arrest or death of drug kingpins. Peña Nieto said after the attacks that the CJNG was going to be treated in similar fashion. CNS chief Rubido García also told reporters that the government was concentrating efforts to capture El Mencho. The reaction from the government was intensive because the attacks were unprecedented in the Mexican drug war; before the attacks, the government had not seen that aggressive of a response from organized crime. According to investigators, the CJNG was able to carry out the attacks because they had territorial knowledge and control, and because they were able to manage resources, logistics, and intelligence information in their favor. In addition, the CJNG was suspected of having well-trained foot soldiers, likely with former police and military training, who employed paramilitary tactics during the 1 May attacks.

The attention shifted from El Mencho on 15 July 2016, when the suspected Sinaloa Cartel leader Joaquín "El Chapo" Guzmán, once on Mexico's most-wanted list, escaped from prison a second time. This event embarrassed the Mexican government, which reallocated resources to apprehend El Chapo. This was important for the CJNG because it allowed El Mencho to re-evaluate the group's violent methods against security forces. Over time, ambushes and attacks against law enforcement declined, and the CJNG began to focus on fighting rival criminal groups and incursions into their turf.

== See also ==
- Timeline of the Mexican drug war
- 2026 Jalisco operation
