= Adelina Zendejas =

Mexican teacher, journalist and feminist

- Born: Adelina Zendejas Gómez; 16 December 1909; Toluca, State of Mexico, Mexico
- Died: 4 March 1993 (aged 83); Mexico City, Mexico
- Occupations: teacher, feminist, journalist
- Years active: 1928–1993

Adelina Zendejas (16 December 1909 – 4 March 1993) was a Mexican teacher, journalist and feminist, who was one of the first writers to discuss gender inequality and the social status of women in the country. In 1988, she was the recipient of the National Journalism Prize.

== Early life ==
Adelina Zendejas Gómez was born on 16 December 1909 in Toluca, State of Mexico, Mexico, to Carmen Gómez Romero and Manuel Zendejas Martínez. As a child, Zendejas wanted to study medicine and was encouraged by her father, a railroad worker and activist and her maternal great-grandfather, Joaquín Eguía Lis, a Catholic intellectual and the first rector of the National University of Mexico, before it gained its autonomy. With the support of José Vasconcelos, who gave her a scholarship to allow her to study, Zendejas entered the Escuela Nacional Preparatoria in 1921, as one of the first women to enter the institution. Among her classmates were Frida Kahlo, Carmen Jaime, Alejandro Gómez Arias, Agustín and Miguel N. Lira, Alfonso Villa, and José Zález Ramírez. After completing her studies at the Preparatoria in 1924, Zendejas studied history, literature and pedagogy, but also took law courses, at the National University of Mexico obtaining her degree in 1928.

== Career ==
Zendejas began her career teaching history and literature at the high school level in 1928. Simultaneously, she began working as a journalist for the newspaper El Universal Gráfico. Teaching was an expected occupation for women at the time, though her university degree rather than a normal school license was unusual, as was her work in journalism, a field dominated by men in that era. In 1929, she joined with Eulalia Guzmán, Elena Landázuri, Antonieta Rivas Mercado, Elena Torres, Luz Uribe, Elvira Vargas, Luz Vera, and others to work on the presidential campaign for Vasconcelos. Though he supported enfranchisement and education for women, Vasconcelos lost his bid for the presidency and Zendejas eventually drifted toward socialism.

In 1935, the Frente Único Pro Derechos de la Mujer (Single Front for Women's Rights, FUPDN) was formed and Zendejas along with others joined the organization. FUPDN's main goals were to fight against fascism and imperialism, support an eight-hour work day, provide agricultural reform and social security, and improve women's lives through health initiatives, full citizenship and the vote. The aims were seen as radical and Zendejas later recounted that when the group held protests in the city square activists were often pelted with rotten fruits and vegetables. In 1937, she joined the Mexican Communist Party pressing for the equality of men and women and an end to social injustice. She continued the fight for women in Mexico to attain the vote through the 1940s, which was finally achieved in 1952.

Zendejas wrote as a correspondent for numerous newspapers including Excélsior, El Nacional, El Popular, and El Universal. Many of her articles were on the rights of women and children and the need for education. She founded two journals Magisterio (Teaching) and La Maestra (The Teacher) in 1956 and served as the director for the Ministry of Finance's Social Services newsletter. That same year, she traveled to Budapest as a delegate to the First World Conference of Women Workers. In 1959, she left teaching after forty-two years and around 1963, she withdrew from the Mexican Communist Party. In 1963, she founded with other colleagues the newspaper El Dia and began writing a column, under the pseudonym Yolia, "Ellas y la vida" (She and life), which she would write for the next eighteen years.

Between 1964 and 1974, Zendejas served as president of the Institute of Friendship and Cultural Exchange Mexico-USSR and was honored the year following her resignation with a medal from the USSR in recognition her work to build friendship and cultural exchange between the two countries. By the time that the second wave of Mexican Feminism began to emerge in 1968, the women of Zendejas' generation were seen as out of step with the student movement, the emerging countercultural movement and the sexual revolution. Young feminists who wanted immediate action, felt that their foremothers had not done enough to transform society. Resenting that characterization, Zendejas would spend the next thirty years researching and writing the history of women's contributions in Mexico.

In 1975, Zendejas coordinated events for the World Conference on Women held in Mexico City. She was a commentator on the newscast "Enlace" which was broadcast in 1981 on Channel 11 and two years later began work as the column editor for "Binomio" in the newspaper Excélsior. Zendejas was honored as a knight in the Order of Friendship of Peoples by the USSR in 1982 and in 1988, received the National Journalism Prize of Mexico.

Among her works are: La guerra: delincuencia infantil y juvenil, La crisis de la educación en México (1958) and Frida Kahlo en la preparatoria (1964). Her two most important volumes, La mujer en la Intervención Francesa (Women in French intervention, 1962) and Las luchas de las mujeres de 1821 a 1975 (Women's struggles from 1821 to 1975, 1993), published after her death. Until her posthumous volume was published, political figures had taken credit for gaining women's suffrage and discounted the women and movements that helped secure women's rights. She recovered the history of the FUPDN, and the women involved in it, like Ester Chapa, Cuca García, Concha Michel and Josefina Vicens, all of whom played a critical role in the social reforms which took place in the post-Revolutionary development of the country.

== Death and legacy ==
Zendejas died on 4 March 1993 in Mexico City. She wrote her own epitaph, which is widely quoted "Luchadora incansable por los derechos de la Mujer y del niño. Mujer revolucionaria y convicta del materialismo dialéctico" (Tireless fighter for the rights of women and children. Revolutionary woman and convicted of dialectical materialism.)
