= 1934 Mexican general election =

- 1 July 1934
- Presidential election
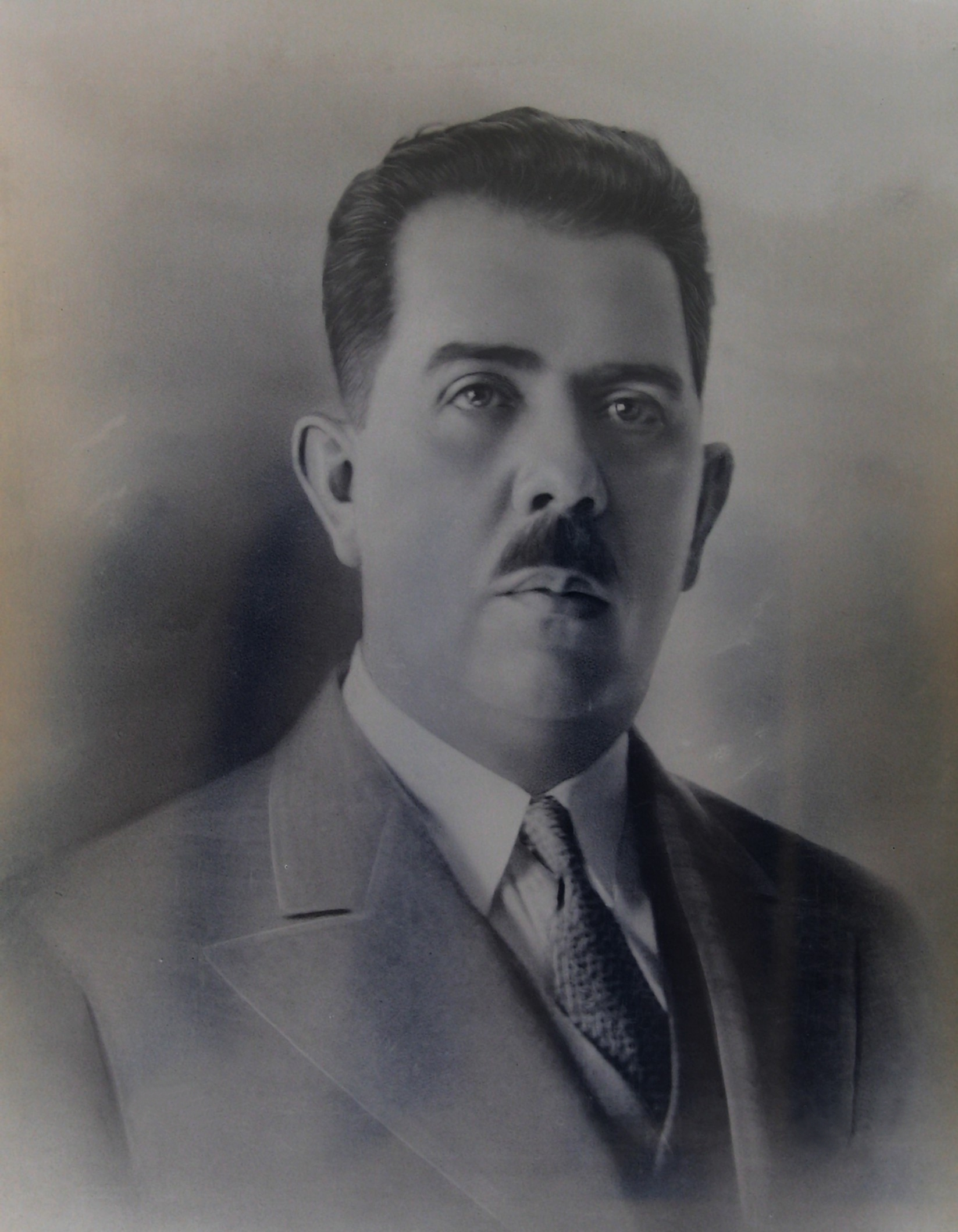

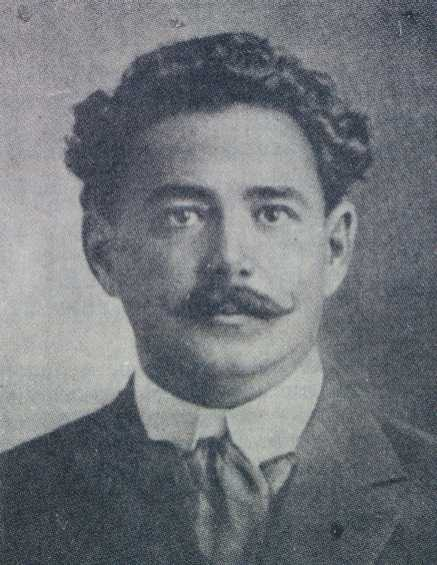
Nominee	Lázaro Cárdenas	Antonio Villarreal
Party	PNR	CPRI
Popular vote	2,225,000	24,395
Percentage	98.19%	1.08%
President before election
Abelardo L. Rodríguez
PNR
Elected President
Lázaro Cárdenas
PNR

General elections were held in Mexico on 1 July 1934. The presidential elections were won by Lázaro Cárdenas, who received 98% of the vote.

== Background ==
After Álvaro Obregón’s attempt to seek reelection in 1928 ended in his assassination, Article 83 of the Constitution was amended in 1933, abolishing presidential reelection once and for all.

The 1934 campaign and elections took place during the final phase of the period known as the Maximato; since 1924, Plutarco Elías Calles (self-proclaimed “Maximum Leader of the Revolution”) had been the most powerful figure in the country (between 1924 and 1928 de jure, as President, and from 1928 onward de facto as the “power behind the throne” while three presidents succeeded one another).

Calles’s founding of the National Revolutionary Party (Partido Nacional Revolucionario, PNR) in 1929 had succeeded, on the one hand, in ensuring the country’s institutional continuity following the assassination of Álvaro Obregón in 1928 and in preventing another government collapse resulting from a new armed rebellion (as evidenced by the defeat of the Escobar rebellion in 1929), while, on the other hand, it had also succeeded in consolidating Calles’s own power.

In the 1929 election, the party nominated Pascual Ortiz Rubio as its presidential candidate; he was declared the winner amid allegations of fraud by the opposition candidate, José Vasconcelos. Ortiz Rubio, whose term was set to last until 1 December 1934, took office on 5 February 1930; he resigned on 2 September 1932, in protest over Calles' excessive interference in his government. Congress appointed Abelardo L. Rodríguez, another protégé of Calles, to complete his term.

As the campaign for the 1934 elections got underway, there was growing discontent in the country over Calles’s continued hold on power. Jorge Basurto argues that "the country had not made much progress since the overthrow of the Porfirian dictatorship: successive governments had not dared to confront the landowning elite, so the agrarian structures remained practically as General Díaz had left them. Industry was far from having made significant strides in its development, and the nationalist elements that had initially characterized the men of the Revolution were disappearing due to the policy of concessions to foreign capital, implemented by the Maximato.”

== Parties and candidates ==
=== PNR and Cárdenas ===
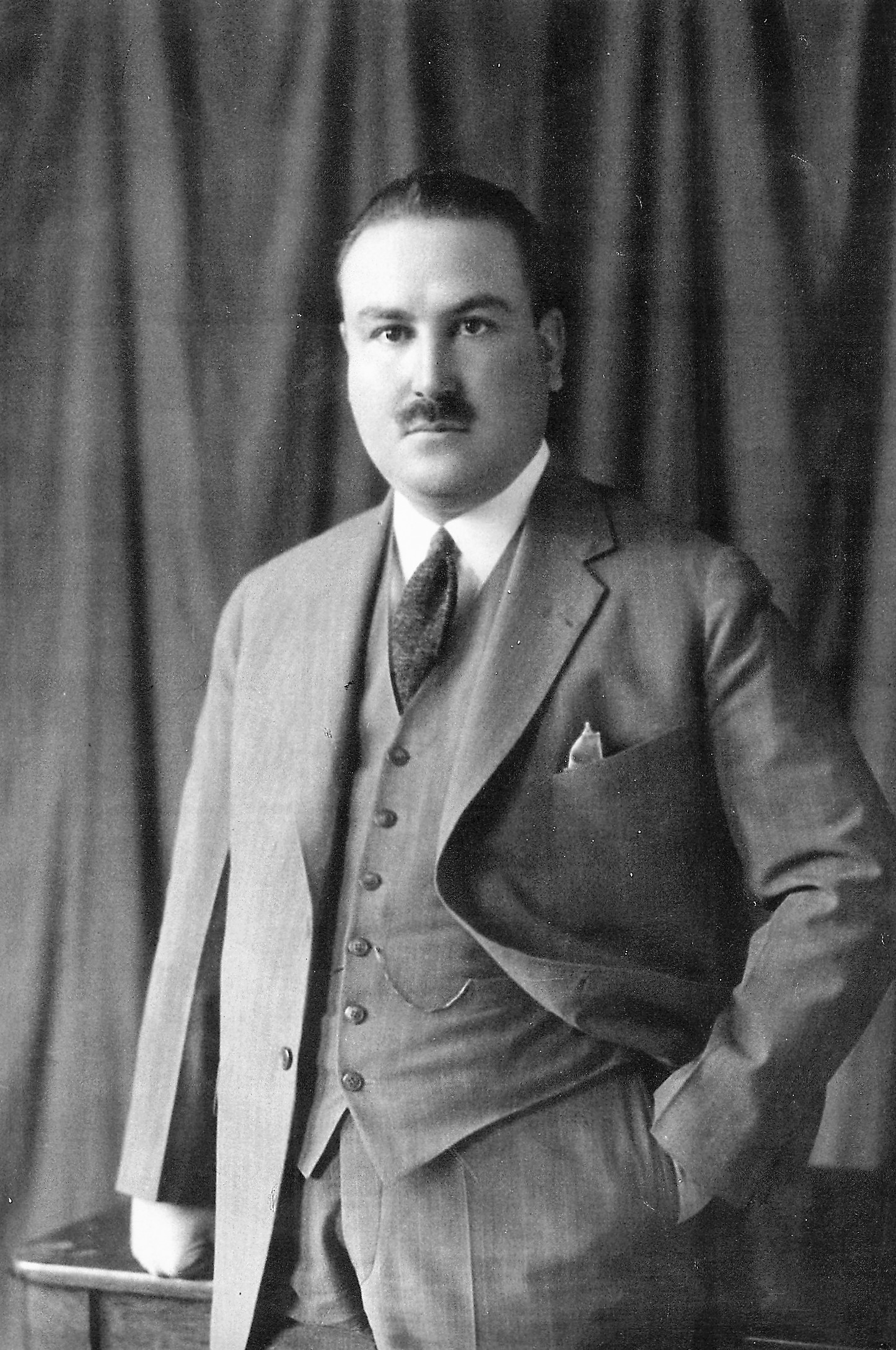
Manuel Pérez Treviño (pictured) had initially been favored by Calles for the PNR's presidential nomination, but he withdrew his pre-candidacy in June 1933.

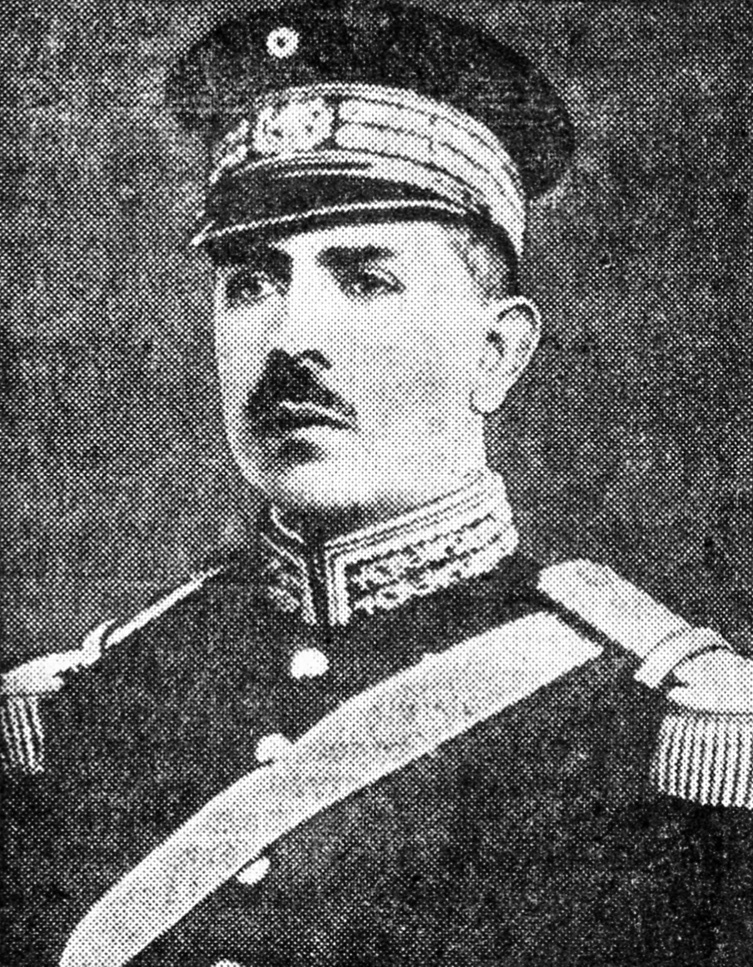
General Lázaro Cárdenas (pictured) was supported by the agrarian faction of the PNR, and Calles himself eventually decided to back him.

Calles had initially favored Manuel Pérez Treviño (president of the PNR) or Carlos Riva Palacio (senator and former Secretary of the Interior) as potential PNR presidential candidates for the 1934 elections. However, the agrarian faction within the party opposed the candidacies of Pérez Treviño or Riva Palacio and instead sought to put forward its own candidate. Within this faction, the most prominent figures were Lázaro Cárdenas (governor of Michoacán), Saturnino Cedillo (former governor and cacique of San Luis Potosí), and Adalberto Tejeda (governor of Veracruz). Cárdenas had drawn attention “for being a staunch supporter of land distribution among needy peasants and of both labor and peasant organizations”. At the same time, he had sought to remain neutral in the political struggles of the elite, thereby avoiding making enemies. Rojas argues that Tejeda, on the other hand, “had earned the enmity of a sector of the army, led by General Amaro, in addition to facing the open hostility of a significant segment of public opinion—the private sector—which saw Don Adalberto as Bolshevism incarnate” due to his support for the armed agrarianists of Veracruz. In January 1933, Cedillo denied having any interest in the PNR’s presidential candidacy, and the agrarian faction began to rally around Cárdenas’s pre-candidacy, who also had the support of former President Emilio Portes Gil, as well as that of Calles’s sons.

In January 1933, Cárdenas was appointed Secretary of War and Navy. In May 1933, several agrarian organizations across the country, as well as a group of Deputies and Senators, publicly announced their support for Cárdenas. That same month, both Cárdenas and Pérez Treviño resigned from their posts (as Secretary of War and President of the PNR, respectively) in order to run for the party’s presidential nomination. Anguiano Equihua wrote that that same month, Calles informed him and other party members present that he had decided to back Cárdenas. On 8 June, Pérez Treviño publicly withdrew his pre-candidacy and asked his supporters to back Cárdenas. Following this announcement, Pérez Treviño re-assumed the presidency of the PNR, which sparked protests among several Cárdenas supporters, a group of whom wrote to Pérez Treviño that “leaving the party in your hands is like ‘putting the church in Luther’s hands.’” Cárdenas's supporters also resented the imposition of the Six-Year Plan (Plan Sexenal), drafted under the direction of Calles (who in September 1933 had replaced Alberto Pani as Secretary of Finance) and which intended to dictate the general policy of the 1934–1940 term.

On 1 June 1933, the PNR issued its official call for nominations to select its candidate for President of the Republic, stipulating that the nomination would take place during the party’s Ordinary Convention (scheduled for December 3–6 of that year in Querétaro) through a secret ballot by state delegates. However, just as had happened with Ortiz Rubio in 1929, Cárdenas (who was the only pre-candidate) was chosen as the party’s presidential candidate by acclamation, rather than by a secret ballot of the delegates, on 6 December. Although Calles had announced his support for Cárdenas as early as May, Basurto argues that he did so “half-heartedly” and considers Cárdenas’s nomination to have been Calles's “first defeat in a long time”.

=== CRPI and Villarreal ===
On 3 October 1933, a public assembly was held to create the Revolutionary Confederation of Independent Parties (Confederación Revolucionaria de Partidos Independientes, CRPI). The three main leaders of the CRPI were Antonio Díaz Soto y Gama, Aurelio Manrique, and Antonio Villarreal; all three had participated in the failed Escobarista rebellion of 1929. According to Villarreal, the CRPI had the support of, among others, the Anti-Reelectionist Party and the Constitutionalist Liberal Party [es]. Villarreal, who had spent several years in the U.S. following the failure of the Escobarista rebellion, managed to return to Mexico in 1933 in time to participate in the 1934 elections (article 82 of the Constitution stipulates that to be President, one must have resided in the country for at least the entire year prior to election day).

On 22 March 1934, the CRPI obtained its legal registration, and its convention was held from 31 March to 1 April, during which Villarreal’s candidacy was formally proclaimed by acclamation, although he had already been campaigning for months.

=== PSI and Tejeda ===
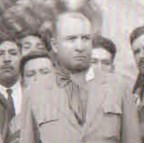
Adalberto Tejeda was the candidate of the Socialist Party of the Left.

Since late 1932, there had been speculation in the media about the possible candidacy of Adalberto Tejeda, the agrarian governor of Veracruz, who at the time was a member of the PNR. Once it became clear that Lázaro Cárdenas would be the PNR’s presidential candidate (and specially after Cárdenas, as Secretary of War, disarmed the agrarianists of Veracruz), Tejeda publicly announced his departure from the party. The Socialist Party of the Left (Partido Socialista de las Izquierdas, PSI), created ad hoc to support Tejeda’s presidential candidacy, obtained its legal registration on October 10, 1933. Some PNR Deputies aligned with Tejeda changed their party affiliation and joined the PSI. Tejeda formally accepted the nomination from the PSI on 15 January 1934.

=== BOCN and Hernán Laborde ===
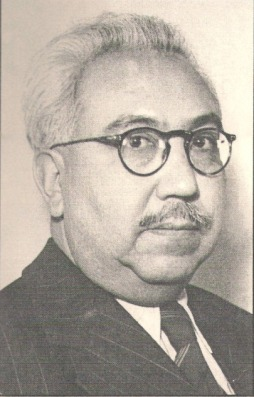
Hernán Laborde was the candidate of the National Workers’ and Peasants’ Bloc.

The Mexican Communist Party, which had been banned since 1925, ran in the 1934 elections under the name “National Workers’ and Peasants’ Bloc” (Bloque Obrero y Campesino Nacional, BOCN). During the BOCN Convention, held in Mexico City on March 29 and 30, 1934, Hernán Laborde was unanimously elected by the 101 delegates as the party’s presidential candidate.

== Results ==
=== President ===
Candidate	Party	Votes	%
Lázaro Cárdenas	National Revolutionary Party	2,225,000	98.19
Antonio Villarreal	Revolutionary Confederation of Independent Parties	24,395	1.08
Adalberto Tejeda Olivares	Socialist Party of the Left	16,037	0.71
Hernán Laborde	National Workers’ and Peasants’ Bloc	539	0.02
Total		2,265,971	100.00
Source: Nohlen

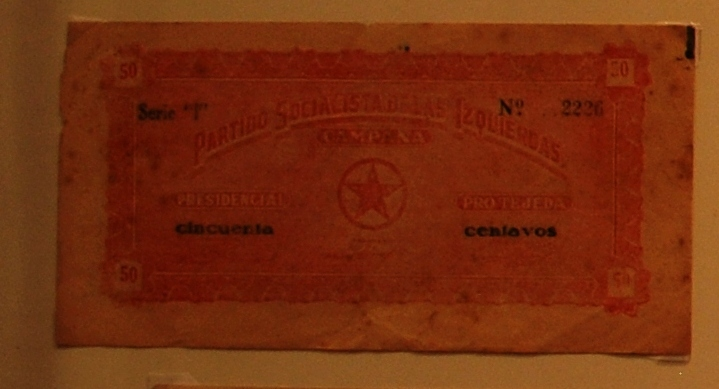
A contribution bond for the Tejeda campaign.

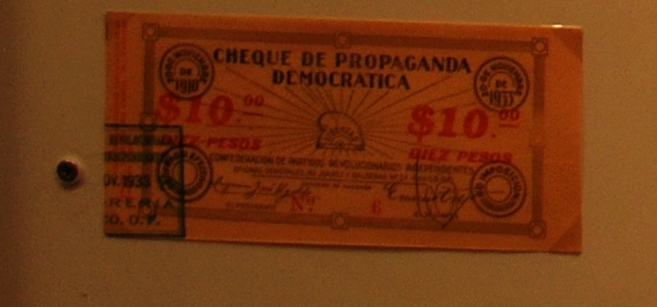
Contribution bond for the Villarreal campaign.
