= Amado Tame Shear =

Mexican politician

Amado Tame Shear (born 8 April 1927), is a Mexican politician. Tame Shear obtained an engineering degree in Mexico City. In 1949 he joined the Mexican Communist Party (PCM). In 1960 he left PCM for the Popular Socialist Party (PPS). He eventually became the Secretary for Educational Policy in the Central Committee of PPS. He was born in Mexico City.

Between 1964 and 1967 he was an alternate for a federal parliamentary seat. He was elected to the federal parliament in 1979 as a PPS candidate from the electoral district 33 (in the Federal District). His parliamentary tenure lasted until 1982.
