= SMN =

SMN may refer to:

- Inari Sámi language, ISO language code of SMN
- Lemhi County Airport, IATA airport code of SMN
- Satellite Music Networks, a US radio network
- Netherland Line (Stoomvaart Maatschappij Nederland)
- Secondary malignant neoplasm (as well "second", or "subsequent" malignant neoplasm), a cancerous tumor that is a metastatic offshoot or a tumor occurring after cancer treatment of a primary tumor
- Seri Maharaja Mangku Negara, a Malaysian honour
- S m
  n theorem, a computability theorem regarding programming languages
- Servicio Meteorológico Nacional (Mexico), Mexico's National Meteorological Service
- Servicio Militar Nacional, Mexico's National Military Service
- Société Métallurgique de Normandie, a steel mill in Caen, Normandy, France
- Stathmin protein
- Shawnee Mission North, a high school in the Shawnee Mission School District in Kansas
- Survival of motor neuron protein, a protein complex
