= Partido Socialista Obrero =

Partido Socialista Obrero may refer to:

- Partido Socialista Obrero, a political party in 1930s Argentina
- Socialist Workers' Party (Chile)
- Mexican Communist Party
