= Concha Michel =

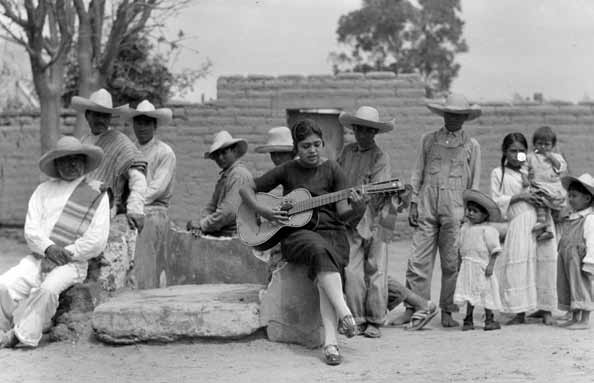
- Born: Concepción Michel; 1899; Villa Purificación, Jalisco, Mexico
- Died: December 27, 1990; Morelia, Michoacán, Mexico
- Occupation: singer-songwriter

Concha Michel (1899–1990) was a Mexican singer-songwriter, political activist, playwright, and a researcher who published several projects on the culture of indigenous communities. She was one of the few women who performed in the corrido style. She created the Institute of Folklore in Michoacan and was one of the first collectors of folklore and preservers of the traditions of the Mexican people. She was a cultural icon having relationships with two presidents, and a broad range of Mexico's most prominent artists including Diego Rivera, Frida Kahlo, Guadalupe Marín, Tina Modotti, Elena Poniatowska, Anita Brenner and others.

== Early life ==
Concepción Michel was born in 1899 in Villa Purificación, Jalisco, Mexico. Her grandfather, Louis Michel, was one of the feudal lords of the Jaliscan Coast where Concha was born. After her birth, the family moved to Salina Cruz, Oaxaca where her father was engaged in trade with seafaring ships. She was a precocious child and her parents sent her at the age of seven to school at the Convento de San Ignacio de Loyola, which her grandfather had built in the village of Ejutla, Jalisco. She stayed four years and learned to sing and play the guitar, but after organizing the other novices to run away and trying to set fire to one of the saints, Concha was expelled. Orphaned young, Michel's sister, Albina, who was 15 years older, was the primary person raising Concha, when she accepted a stipend to study opera at the Guadalajara conservatory. Dates of events during this period, according to Jocelyn Olcott are difficult to pinpoint, but Concha had a daughter before her 15th birthday; lived briefly in New York; returned to Mexico; married, had a son, and divorced.

== Activism ==
In 1918 Michel joined the Communist Party (PCM) and began a life partnership with Hernán Laborde, General Secretary and first Deputy of the PCM. By 1925 she had interested the government in her project to document indigenous songs and from 1925 to 1926 Concha traveled the country collecting examples of folklore and songs for the Secretary of Education (SEP).

In 1932, Michel decided to move to New York, where she attended the School of Social Sciences for about a year. While in New York, she sang at a birthday party for John D. Rockefeller in his home and attended an opening held at the Museum of Modern Art, New York, where she won $1200. She used her winnings to travel to Europe and the Soviet Union. She was a friend to Frida Kahlo and Diego Rivera.

Her goal of going to Russia was to study the conditions of women in a socialist country and while there, she met Alexandra Kollontai, Nadezhda Krupskaya, and Clara Zetkin and saw her friend Tina Modotti. Near the end of 1933, Michel returned from the Soviet Union and re-signed with SEP's Cultural Missions program as a "rural organizer". Her plans were to help women gain land independently from their fathers or husbands, so that women's collectives could farm them for subsistence. She was not a feminist, though later activists would claim her as a proto-feminist, as she believed in working within the system of Mexican gender. She felt that men's endorsement and collaboration with women's projects were vital to their success. In any case, her vocal disagreement with the communist party on women's issues led to her expulsion from the party in 1933. Concha's response was to publish a pamphlet Marxistas y “marxistas,” explaining her views on "the woman question".

In 1936, Michel led a group of about 250 women to invade one of President Plutarco Elías Calles’s estates, claiming it should be made into a woman's training center, since the revolution had given rural women nothing. Calles's guards removed the women while Concha was negotiating with him. While unsuccessful, it gained her support of policymakers and Calles's successor, Lázaro Cárdenas sent her a reply that he would grant her another hacienda for founding a training center. The next several years were devoted to women's issues, as Concha helped reorganize the defunct Women's Revolutionary Institute, began serving as secretary for the Confederación Campesina Mexicana (Mexican Peasant Confederation) and was heavily involved in federal policy-making.

== Revolutionary art ==
The appointment of José Vasconcelos in 1921 as Secretary of State for Public Education was one of the pivotal moments in the Mexican art world. Vasconcelos proposed that the best artists in the country be used to promote the philosophy and ideals of the Mexican Revolution to the largely uneducated public. Leftist artists saw this encouragement as a means of producing art heavily reflecting communist ideology. Michel provided the vocal accompaniment to the visual records left by the Mexican mural movement photography of Tina Modotti, Aurora Reyes, Frida Kahlo and others. The themes running throughout the art in this period exalt socialism and communism, workers, and allusions to indigenous culture like bandoliers, flags, guitars, hands, machetes, peasants and opposing classism.

On December 3, 1929, Modotti opened a show at the Biblioteca Nacional de Mexico and Concha Michel performed. Michel traveled throughout Mexico with President Cardenas attending rallies and mass organizational meetings, using her music to agitate for her political ideals and tell the stories of the revolution. Michel introduced Diego Rivera to his future wife, Lupe Marín and Marín Modotti and Michel served as his models for various works. At Kahlo's last exhibit in 1953, Michel was by her side.

In addition to her own song-writing, Concha wrote ten plays. As Michel traveled the country with Cardenas, she gathered indigenous songs and collected some 5,000 works, though she struggled to find interest in publishing them. In 1951, part of her collection Cantos indígenas de México was published.

== Views on women ==
Throughout her life, Concha worked to improve the life of women. Her vision focused on the duality of humankind, and she saw that there was a need for men and women to work together recognizing equal importance of their roles.

In the 1980s, Concha, along with eight other women, including Aurora Reyes, Natalia Moguel and Antonieta Rascón, signed a document they called La Dualidad (The Duality). It was a document calling for world action to recognize the duality of both male and female and calling for the inclusion of women and men in the fight against patriarchy.

== Personal life ==
At around the age of fifteen, Concha had a child named Yolia with a law student from Chihuahua named Fernando Cásares. Michel placed the child in a foundling home so that she could work. Her daughter contracted bronchial pneumonia and died when she was seventeen months old. While still in mourning, Concha married a German-Austrian man who was twenty years her senior, Pablo Rieder, with whom she had a son, Godofredo. She and Rieder divorced shortly after the birth of her son. In 1918, Michel began a relationship with her life partner, Hernán Laborde.

Concha Michel died on December 27, 1990, in Morelia, Michoacán at the age of 93.

== Selected works ==
- Obras cortas de teatro revolucionario y popular, (1931)
- Pastorela o coloquio, (1932).
- Dos antagonismos fundamentales, (1938).
- Corridos revolucionarios, 1938–1939 (1939).
- Obras de teatro para la mujer, (1942).
- Amor en las sombras, novela original, adaptada para el cine, (1944).
- Cantos indígenas de México, (1951).
- Dios nuestra señora, (1966).
- Guanajuato : la ciudad de la belleza acrecentada, (1968).
- Dios-principio es la pareja, (1974).
- with Quetzal Rieder Espinoza. Mexico en sus cantares, (1997).
