= Hernán Laborde =

Mexican politician

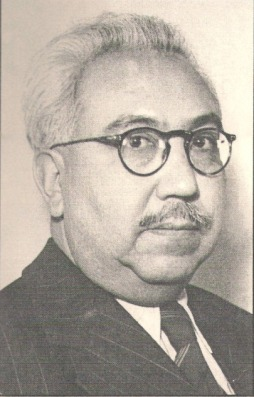

General Secretary of the Mexican Communist Party
- In office 1927–1940

Personal details
- Born: 18 November 1895 Veracruz, Veracruz, Mexico
- Died: 1 May 1955 (aged 59) Mexico City, D.F., Mexico
- Party: Mexican Communist Party

Hernán Laborde Rodríguez (18 November 1895 – 1 May 1955) was a Mexican communist politician.

He was born in Veracruz on 18 November 1895, the son of Francisco Laborde and Rosenda Rodríguez. Laborde joined the Mexican Communist Party (PCM) in 1925. He was part of the Alianza de los Ferrocarrileros Mexicanos since 1924, and during the railroad strikes that took place between 1926 and 1927 he was one of its leaders, but would be apprehended and imprisoned by orders of the Calles government. He was elected deputy in July 1928, a position he held until May 1929 when he was debarred. In 1929 he was elected Secretary General of the PCM, being its main leader until the beginning of 1940 when he was expelled from the party for refusing to participate in the I Extraordinary Congress of the PCM. In 1934 he was a candidate for the Presidency of Mexico for the PCM, obtaining only a few hundred votes.

Along with Valentín Campa, Laborde opposed the PCM conducting a smear campaign against Leon Trotsky after he had fled to Mexico. At the same time, both communist leaders questioned the "unity at all costs" policy imposed by the Communist International, which earned them removal from the leadership and expulsion from the PCM on orders from the International. After his expulsion from the PCM, he was one of the founders of Unified Socialist Action (Spanish: Accion Socialista Unificada) in 1940, and the Mexican Worker-Peasant Party (Spanish: Partido Obrero-Campesino Mexicano (POCM)) in 1951. He died on International Workers' Day in 1955.

He was a partner of the singer and activist Concha Michel, whom he met in the Mexican Communist Party.

== Works ==
- Tabernarias (1922)
- El por qué de mi desafuero (1930)
- Lombardo Toledano y los comunistas: parte del discurso pronunciado el 1o. mayo de 1934 (1934)
- La nueva política del Partido Comunista de México (1935)
- Yucatán para los yucatecos (1936)
- La U.R.S.S. y Trotsky (1936)
- La política de unidad a toda costa: informe al pleno del Comité Central del Partido Comunista de México, celebrado del 26 al 30 de junio de 1937 (1937)
- Contra el peligro fachista: resolución adoptada por el pleno del Comité Central del Partido Comunista de México sobre el informe del compañero Hernán Laborde en primer punto de la orden del día, 4 al 7 de diciembre de 1937 (1937)
- Unidad a toda costa: informe al pleno del Comité Central del Partido Comunista de México, celebrado del 26 al 30 de junio de 1937 (1937)
- La revolución amenazada: Discurso pronunciado por el C. Hernán Laborde, Secretario General del Partido Comunista de México, en el mitin de aniversario de la revolución mexicana, celebrado por la Confederación de Trabajadores de México (1937)
- Rusia de hoy (1938)
- Para vencer en 1940, todos a la Convención del P.R.M.: informe (1939)
- El enemigo es Almazán: informe del comp. Hernán Laborde, Secretario General del Partido Comunista Mexicano, al pleno del Comité Nacional, reunido en México del 16 al 20 de septiembre de 1939 (1939)
- Paz y trabajo, no violencia ni sangre: el Partido Comunista ante la sucesión presidencial (1939)
- Unidos!: Tras un sólo candidato para derrotar a la reacción (1939)
- La verdad sobre la segunda guerra inter-imperialista: interpretación Marxista-Leninista (1939)
- Historia de la economía Soviética (1948)
- El existencialismo, filosofía reaccionaria (1949)
- Portes Gil y su libro: Quince años de política mexicana (1950)
- Madre del hombre. Canto de amor y paz (1954)
- Estrella de oriente y otras canciones de paz y vida (1964)
- Apuntes sobre nuestra expulsión y la crisis del PCM (1975)

== See also ==
- Concha Michel
