= Valentín Campa =

Mexican politician

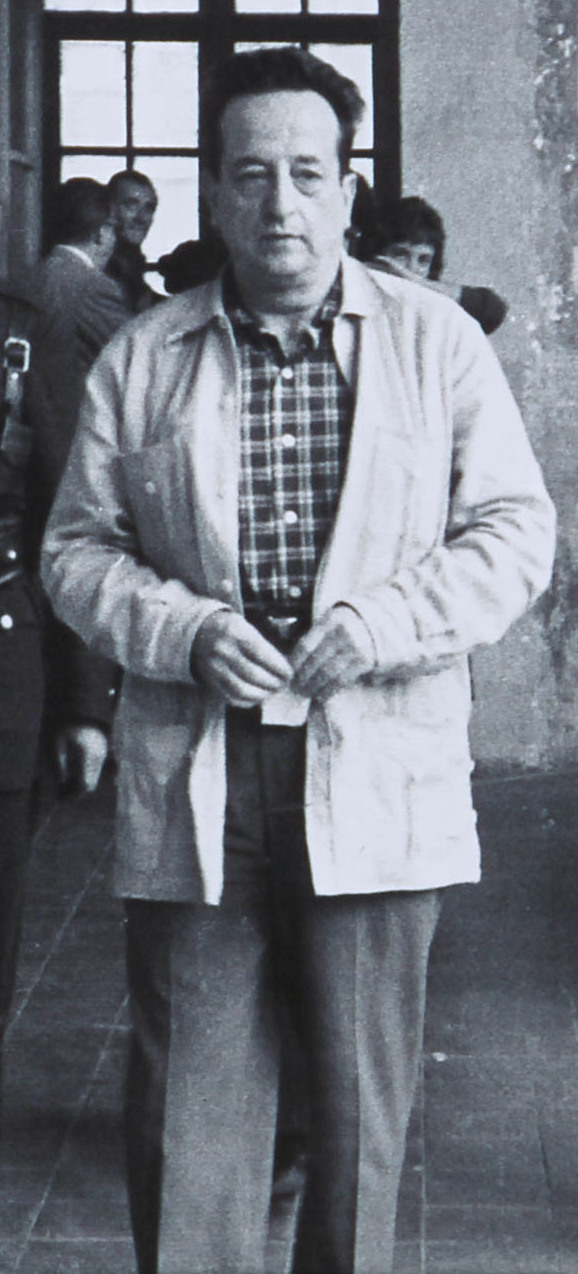

Valentín Campa Salazar (14 February 1904 – 25 November 1999) was a Mexican railway union leader and presidential candidate. Along with Demetrio Vallejo, he was considered one of the leaders of the 1958 railway strikes. Campa was also the founder of the National Railroad Council and the defunct underground newspaper The Railwayman.

== Communist Party ==
Campa was born in Monterrey, Nuevo León, and joined the Mexican Communist Party (Spanish: Partido Comunista Mexicano, PCM) in 1927 at the age of 25; eventually becoming the youngest member of the party's Central Committee. Campa's views would eventually draw the ire of the party. In March 1940, he was expelled from the PCM along with the party Secretary General, Hernán Laborde. The two, along with others in the party, were removed for arguing that the assassination of Leon Trotsky should be delayed. Campa believed the killing of Trotsky would make him a martyr and only damage the credibility of the party's message.

In 1976, Campa was chosen as the presidential candidate for the PCM. The PCM was not certified to run an electoral candidate, however, it was rumored Campa garnered approximately one million votes. The count was never reported since the PRI candidate, José López Portillo, ran officially unopposed. Campa's campaign was supported by the Socialist League and Movimiento de Organizacion Socialista. The campaign was called "The March for Democracy" by supporters and bore the slogan "Campa, Candidate of the Workers Struggle." Campa supported, and discussed in the 97 political meetings he attended over the three-month race, priests' political rights, academic freedom, and democracy within the Mexican army. While the campaign, due to its unofficial structure, ran without media access, it is estimated that over 100,000 people attended the political meetings held by Campa, and over 10,000 people in support of Campa, attended the closing event at the Arena México in the nation's capital.

== CTM/STFRM ==
Campa was a member of the executive committee of the Union of Railroad Workers of the Mexican Republic (Spanish: Sindicato de Trabajadores Ferrocarrileros de la Republica Mexicana, STFRM) from 1943 to 1947. In 1944 a split began to develop within the party and the president was asked to step in and assist in reaching a compromise. Luis Gómez Zepeda was chosen as secretary general and Campa was elected to serve as Secretary of Education, Organization and Propaganda.

In 1947, Campa lead a breakaway faction within the Confederation of Mexican Workers (Spanish: Confederación de Trabajadores de México, CTM) called the Special Confederation of Workers (Spanish: Confederacion Única de Trabajadores, CUT). The new labor confederation included telephonists, railroad workers, miners and oil workers. The goal of the CUT was to be an independent labor movement, devoid of government influence it alleged plagued the CTM. The following year, in 1948, Jesús Díaz de León was elected to the position of STFRM secretary general. On 28 September, Díaz de León filed a petition with the Attorney General against Campa and Gómez Zepeda, who he felt were a "communist menace," on charges of embezzlement of 100,000 pesos.

The union was outraged at the actions of Díaz de León, particularly on the grounds that such charges are to be presented to the union's vigilance committee. The union's general accounting committee followed suit, condemning Díaz de León's actions as having solicited the government into the unions affairs. The union's executive committee and vigilance committee release statements accusing Díaz de León of "wanting to divide the union in complicity with the government" and temporarily suspended him, placing Francisco Quintano Madrazo in his place. Díaz de León however rallied his supporters, appearing at the headquarters of the STFRM, along with an estimated one hundred secret police officers dressed as railway workers. The supporters assaulted the STFRM headquarters, and their actions were directed from the rear by his grandfather, Senator Colonel Serrano, from a jeep and speaker system attached to a military truck.

By 8 October, local newspapers were running stories stating Campa and Gómez were wanted by the Federal Judicial Police. Campa was eventually detained as well as members of the executive and vigilance committee, by the judicial police on charges of transferring 200,000 pesos to Campa's break off group CUT. Campa maintained and provided proof that the actions were accounted for and proper permission granted. Campa went underground and protested the charges, stating he earned only 575 pesos a month in his position and owned no house, no car, or no business and could not have benefited personally. Campa avoided arrest until November 1949 and was then sentenced to eight years on the charge of fraud, he was held until 1952 at Lecumberri Prison.

== Strikes of 1959 ==
In February 1959, the previous collective contract for the railroad unions had lapsed and a deadline for a new contract was fast approaching. On 24 March, the strike officially began as all three of the railway enterprises, The Pacific, Mexican Railways, and Veracruz Terminal began work stoppages. The railway officials refused to acknowledge the strike and ordered the union members to return to work. On 26 March, the railway officials began to fire employees, over 13,000 in total, with many arrested. In protest, the STFRM held a one-hour complete work stoppage and general strike. On Good Friday, 27 March, a proposal was presented directly to President Adolfo López Mateos, the demands being reduced to payment on the seventh day of rest and a swift end to the repression. The president began to stall as over 100,000 people were on strike and an estimated millions of pesos were lost.

On 28 March, Vallejo was kidnapped along with 28 others by the Federal Police and the army. The government mobilized several battalions of troops, fired another 9,000 workers and arrested over 10,000. The arrests spread beyond railway workers to professors, peasants and Marxist-Leninist activists. Campa was wanted by authorities for his role in leading the strikes. On 3 April Gilberto Rojo Robles, deputy to Vallejo, issued a notice to all workers to return to work on the basis a deal was made, however no such agreement came to pass. Rojo Robles was soon after arrested along with Alberto Lumbreras, and Miguel Aroche Parra of the POCM and Dionisio Encina, secretary for the PCM. Campa, however, would remain at large, directing railroad strikes for a year. While in hiding, Campa founded the National Railroad Council in 1959 and started an underground newspaper titled The Railwayman. In May 1960, Campa was finally arrested and imprisoned.

Vallejo and Campa were released after serving ten years of their eleven-year sentence. The rising student movement had succeeded in pressuring Gustavo Díaz Ordaz to repeal the law against "social dissolution." On 27 July 1970, Campa and Vallejo were released. Following Vallejos release, he refused to join Campa in the National Railroad Council, instead opting to found his own group, Railwaymen's Union Movement (MSF).
