= Florinda Lazos León =

Mexican revolutionary and politician

Florinda Lazos León (San Cristóbal de Las Casas, March 3, 1898 – San José, December 7, 1973) was a Mexican revolutionary, journalist, politician and suffragist.

Florinda Lazos was a combatant in the Mexican Revolution. She held various jobs, from nurse to deputy. She was also one of the organizers of the first Congress of Workers and Peasants of Chiapas in 1919. Lazos León represents many revolutionaries who helped advance equality in Mexico and education in Chiapas and has been considered one of the popular personalities of this region.

== Biography ==
Florinda Lazos León was born in San Cristóbal de las Casas in Chiapas (Mexico) in 1898. She was the daughter of Abel Lazos and Sofía de León.

She studied primary, secondary and nursing in the Libertad del Sur Army. In 1911 Florinda Lazos León accompanied her uncle, the engineer Manuel Lazos, and the other members of a commission from Chiapas when they met with Francisco in San Juan Bautista. That same year, a group of feminists from Mexico City demanded the right to vote from the provisional president, Francisco León de la Barra.

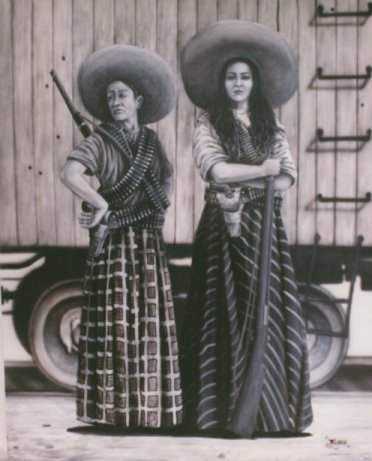
adelitas or soldaderas

== Mexican Revolution ==
Florinda Lazos León actively participated in the Mexican Revolution.

During the Mexican revolution or the armed stage of the revolution, the participation of women on the battlefield alongside the soldiers was impressive. Revolutionary women were in charge of collecting medicine, ammunition, clothing, food, etc.

During the Huertista usurpation, Lazos León joined the Zapatista forces of General Ángel Barrios' division, and worked as a courier. As to her devotion for the cause of liberation she also worked as a nurse in the southern liberation army under the command of Colonel Prudencio Cassal. All the women who joined the Mexican revolution were known as "adelitas or soldaderas" . They defended the freedom of their homeland and were considered one of the first feminist movements.

In 1917 she was part of the women's commission that at the beginning of that year interceded to pacify the anti-Carrancista rebels of Tiburcio Fernández Ruiz, who were fighting in that state against the government. She not only intervened in Chiapas, but also in battlefields in the interior of the country.

Lazos León was the one who delivered the news of the murder of Emiliano Zapata.
