= Aurora Reyes Flores =

Mexican painter and muralist (1908–1985)

Aurora Reyes-Flores
- Interview with author Hector Godoy about the artist (in Spanish)
- Born: September 9, 1908; Hidalgo del Parral
- Died: April 26, 1985 (aged 76); Mexico City
- Education: Escuela Nacional de Bellas Artes
- Known for: Painting
- Notable work: Atentado a los Maestros Rurales
- Movement: Mexican muralism

Aurora Reyes Flores (born in Hidalgo del Parral, September 9, 1908 – Mexico City, April 26, 1985) was a Mexican artist, known as a painter and writer, and she was the first female muralist in Mexico and first exponent of Mexican muralism. She also went by the name Aurora Reyes.

== Life ==
Reyes was the daughter of the soldier León Reyes and his wife Luisa Flores. Her grandfather was general Bernardo Reyes, and her uncle Alfonso Reyes was also a well-known writer and scholar.

In 1913, Aurora Reyes and her family fell into poverty in the outbreak of the Mexican Revolution, as they were forced to flee their home, partially due to the political allegiance of her father, Captain Leon Reyes. Her father remained in hiding, while Aurora and the rest of her family went underground in Mexico City, the capital. To stay afloat, Aurora's mother, Luisa Flores, baked bread for her daughters to sell at the Lagunilla market. Apart from the comfort of her hometown, Chihuahua, Aurora witnessed first-hand the sacrifices and harshness of life in poverty.

In an interview from 1953, Reyes reflected on her early life, saying, “I am interested in social issues because I have suffered hunger, I myself have suffered misery… I am concerned for the people because I belong to the people. I believe that art has the means to penetrate the emotions of human beings, and that is why it can be a powerful weapon to fight for the people."

She joined the Escuela Nacional Preparatoria in 1921, but was expelled due to an altercation with another student regarding her family's political association with Diego Rivera and communism.

She married the journalist Jorge Godoy, and gave birth to her son Héctor in 1926. Shortly after divorcing her husband in 1931, she bore her second son Jorge.

She had a love interest in Cuban poet Nicolás Guillén.

Reyes continued her studies, and received a PhD in Art History from Rutgers University, New Jersey, as well as receiving a Bachelor of Arts from the National University of Buenos Aires, Argentina. In school, she focused on the history of 20th century Mexican art and muralism history. Additionally, in her own studies she specialized in studying female artists.

Reyes had relationships with artists that she would parallel with. She had a strong friendship with Frida Kahlo. They were classmates at the Escuela Nacional Prepatoria in the early 1920s; however, Reyes was expelled shortly after enrolling. Her expulsion did not keep them apart; photos captured them together and happy. They remained friends for the rest of their lives. They were important to each other, so much so that Reyes was part of the honor guard at Kahlo's funeral. Another friendship that Reyes had was with Concha Michel. This friendship flourished when Kahlo got married in the late 1920s.

Despite her artistic success and outspoken personality, she died nearly forgotten.

== Art ==
Reyes is the first female Mexican-born muralist, and a distinguished writer. From 1921 to 1923, she was a student at the Escuela Nacional de Bellas Artes. She had her first solo exhibition at the ARS Gallery in 1925. She exhibited her work at the Salón de la Plástica Mexicana and participated in collective exhibitions in France, Cuba, the United States and Mexico.

In 1927, she began teaching drawing and painting for the Secretariat of Public Education, from which she retired in 1964.

She created seven murals in her lifetime. In 1936, she completed a mural called Atentado a los maestros rurales (Attack on Rural Schoolteachers) at the Centro Escolar Revolución. This mural showed how capitalism was at the core of brutality in the Mexican society. In 1937 Reyes painted Woman of War. This work shows a woman ready to participate in the war due to her deceased child. The child was a victim of war; the mother has nothing left and is ready to fight. Between 1960 and 1972 she painted another four murals in the Auditorium of 15th May of the Sindicato Nacional de Trabajadores de la Educación (SNTE). In 1978 she finished her sixth mural at the Hernán Cortés house in Coyoacán.

Her literary works include Nueve estancias en el desierto, Humanos paisajes, and Espiral en retorno. She received awards for her poetry.

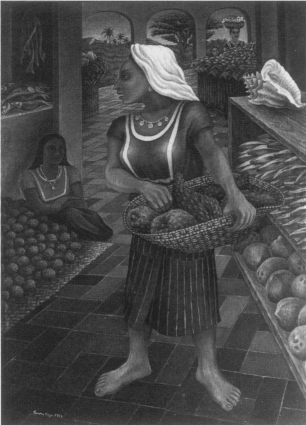
Juchitan Market, 1953

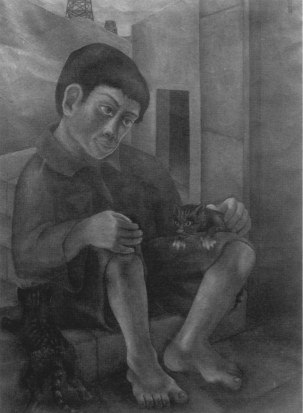
Sick Child, 1937

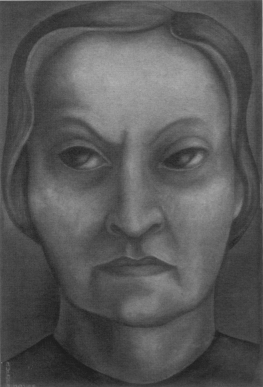
Portrait of Kroupskaia, 1930

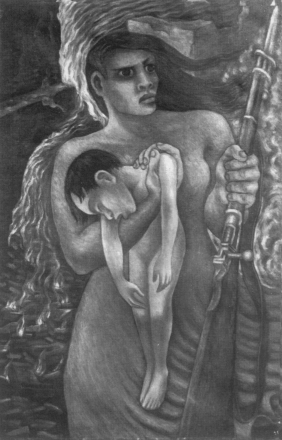
Woman of War, 1937

== Politics ==
Reyes was outspoken and political, earning the nickname "Magnolia Iracunda" (Fiery Magnolia). Her family's time in Mexico City left them very poor, which later influenced her politics. She was member of the Partido Comunista Mexicano, a founding member of the Liga de Escritores y Artistas Revolucionarios and of the Confederación Nacional Campesina. Reyes was also a member of the Enseñanza de la República Mexicana in which she defended the rights and participation of women in government and teaching positions. Reyes was also part of other issues. She fought for women's right to vote and their right to hold elected civil posts, an extension on maternity leave and recognition of breastfeeding time for mothers of young children. She also promoted the creation of daycare centers for the children of schoolteachers.

In 1960 she participated with other intellectuals in a hunger strike on behalf of political prisoners in Mexico. In 1968, she participated in the student uprising, which forced her into hiding at the La Castañeda psychiatric hospital for a time.
