= Conscription in Mexico =

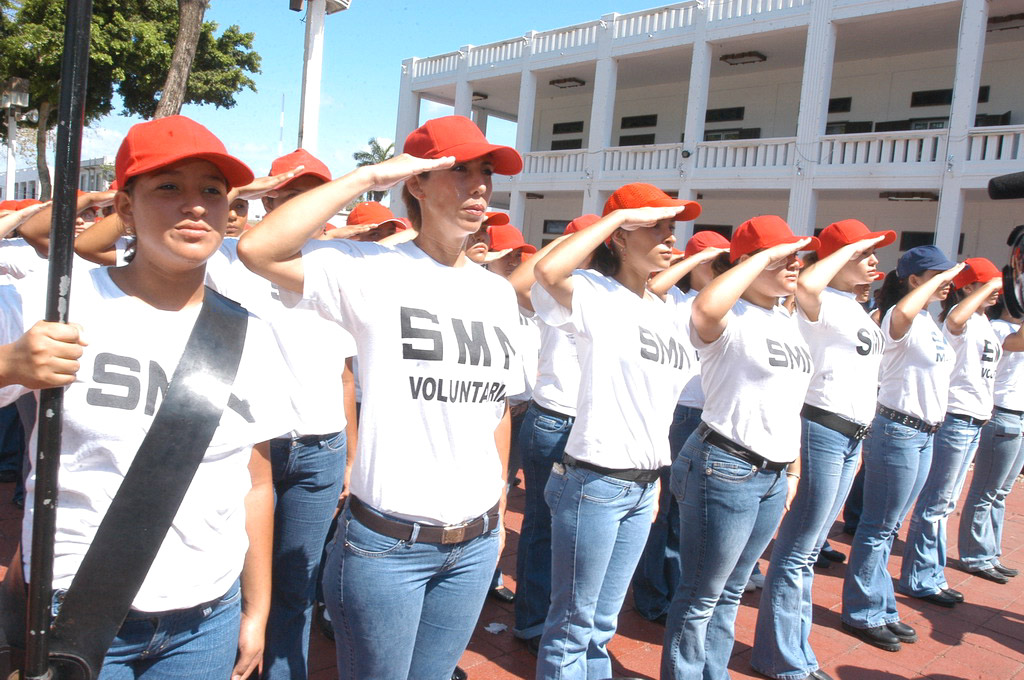
Women of the volunteered National Military Service

Military service in Mexico (Spanish: Servicio Militar Nacional, or SMN) currently involves all males reaching the age of eighteen years. Selection is made by a lottery system using the following color scheme: those who draw a black ball must serve as "availability reservists", that is, they are not required to perform any activities whatsoever and will receive their discharge card at the end of the year. Those who draw a white ball must serve “framed” which means, they must start service immediately from 8am-1pm for one year in total, until they receive the discharge card. Conscripts who live in Mexico will go to their closest mayor’s office or municipal board to complete the service. Those who live abroad perform the service abroad at a consulate, skip the ball lottery, and complete the service as “availability reservists”.

The ones who get a white ball serve in a Batallón del Servicio Militar Nacional (National Military Service Battalion) composed entirely of one-year SMN conscripts. In certain cities, such as Veracruz and Ciudad Madero, the lottery system also includes a blue ball; whoever draws it must serve in the Naval Infantry MS Battalions.

In 2000, President Vicente Fox Quesada reformed the law to allow for voluntary military service to be performed by females of military age. Volunteers (females) always serve as “framed” and get a certificate of achievement in place of a discharge card.

“Framed” conscripts are trained in basic combat with fire weapons, in one infantry Battalion either of the Army or Naval Infantry.

== History ==
Their formation was brought about after German submarine attacks against Mexican oil tankers that were providing fuel and material to the Allies during World War II. These attacks eventually caused the Mexican government to declare war on Nazi Germany and the other Axis powers. Mexico sent an expeditionary force, the Escuadrón 201, to fight in the Battle of Luzon.

In 2014, President Enrique Peña Nieto introduced short three-month service terms for servicemen.

Activities include exercise, gardening, picking up falling trees, agility drills, weapons instruction, classes about military doctrine, patriotism, civil defense and military laws, saluting the flag, cleaning up parks and street, painting and in some cases martial arts and self-defense training.

== See also ==
- Mexican Armed Forces
- Escuadrón 201
- SS Faja de Oro
- Military Service
- Conscription
