= Villa Purificación =

- Municipality and town
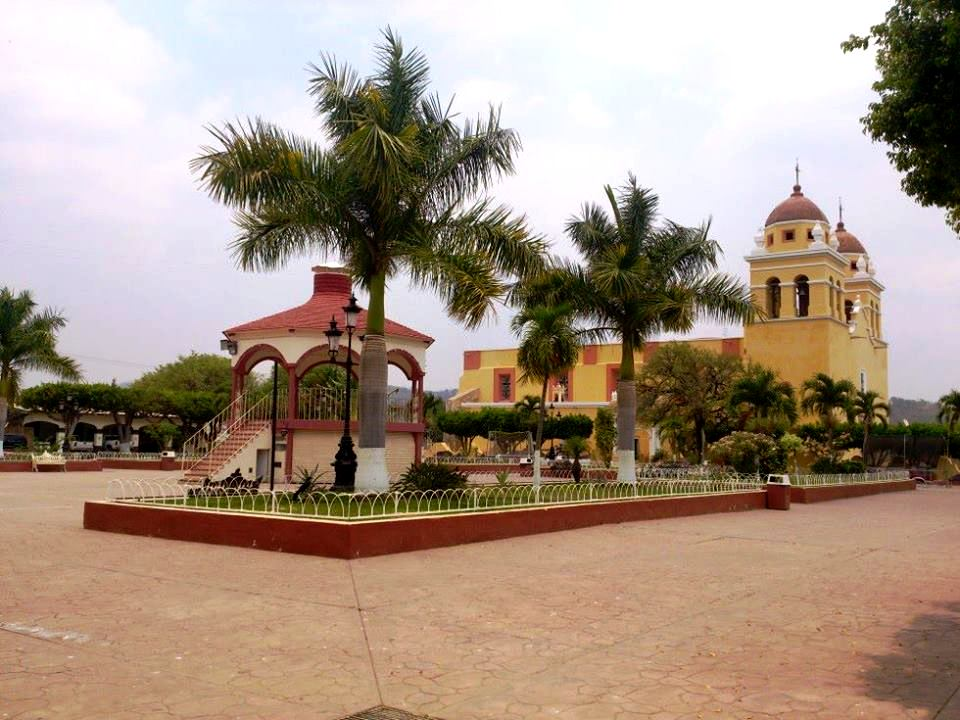
- Main plaza

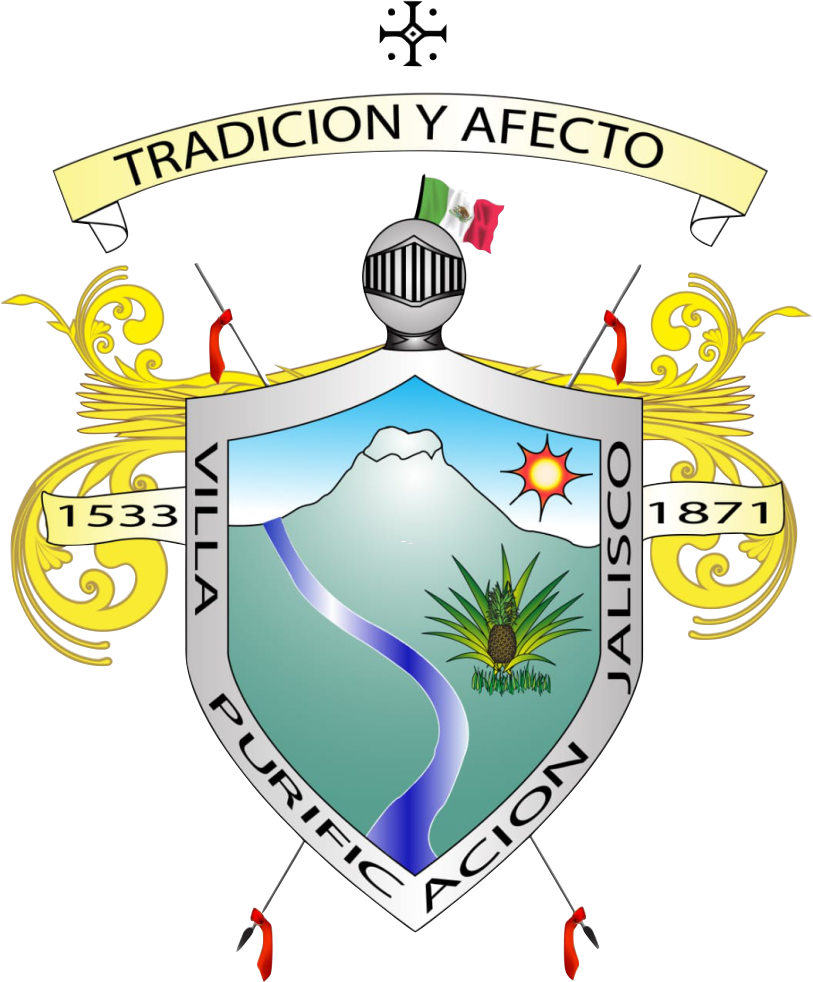
- Coat of arms

- Location in Mexico Villa Purificación (Mexico)
- Coordinates: 19°34′N 104°23′W
- Country: Mexico
- State: Jalisco

Area
  - Total: 1,848 km^{2} (714 sq mi)
  - Town: 2.89 km^{2} (1.12 sq mi)

Population (2020 census)
  - Total: 11,303
  - Density: 6.116/km^{2} (15.84/sq mi)
  - Town: 5,965
  - Town density: 2,060/km^{2} (5,350/sq mi)
- Time zone: UTC-6 (Central Standard Time)

Villa Purificación is a town and municipality, in Jalisco in central-western Mexico. The municipality covers an area of 1,848 km^{2}. As of 2005, the municipality had a total population of 10,975. It is in the southern coast of Jalisco, southeast of Guadalajara. Costa del Sur de Jalisco, sureste de Guadalajara. The population is about 11,300.

== History ==
Villa Purificación has a long history: it was founded by the Spanish on the second of February in 1533, and was the first municipality in Jalisco, founded in 1871 after Mexican independence. Villa Purificación celebrates holidays such as Candlemas, or Nuestra Señora de la Candelaria. The area is also known for its crafts such as ceramics and huaraches. Villa Purificación is mostly agricultural, with people growing crops and raising cattle.

== Climate ==
According to the Köppen climate classification, Villa Purificación is in the tropical savanna climate, or Aw. It has hot, humid summers, and dry winters.

== History ==
In 1532 Nuño Beltrán de Guzmán sent Captain Juan Fernández de Híjar to the province of El Tuito and crowned them to look for a place in order to found a villa. In this virtue, Fernández de Híjar with 25 soldiers marched south and founded on February 2, 1533, the Villa of Purification in the valley of Tecomatlán and also established the first chapel in the now state of Jalisco. Upon the arrival of the Spaniards, Purification belonged to a small province populated by Indians from Saulam, or Sayula, formed by the villages of Tenzitlán, Xirosto, Jew, Pampochin, Amborí, La Silla, Cuxmalán, Carrion and Melahuacan as the headboard. The conquest of this region is due to Francisco Cortés de San Buenaventura, in 1525, remaining within the province.

== Government ==
=== Municipal presidents ===
Municipal president	Term	Political party	Notes
Rosa Ofelia García Pelayo	01-01-1983–31-12-1985	PRI	
Crescencio Michel Michel	01-01-1986–31-12-1988	PRI	
Ramón N. Pelayo Pelayo	01-01-1989–1992	PRI	
Pedro Díaz Martínez	1992–1995	PAN	
Francisco Pelayo García	1995–1997	PAN	
Salvador Pelayo García	01-01-1998–31-12-2000	PRI	
Saúl Llamas Romero	01-01-2001–31-12-2003	PRI	
Iván Manuel García Michel	01-01-2004–31-12-2006	PAN	
Carlos Antonio Pelayo García	01-01-2007–31-12-2009	PRI	Results were reverted in favor of the PRI by a higher electoral authority, due to cheating and trickery performed by some members of the National Action Party (PAN, Partido Acción Nacional) at a voting booth
Moisés Domínguez Esparza	01-01-2010–30-09-2012	PAN	
Valentín Rodríguez Peña	01-10-2012–30-09-2015	PRI; PVEM	Coalition "Compromise for Jalisco"
Édgar Manuel Medina Reyes	01-10-2015–30-09-2018	PAN	
Moisés Brambila Pelayo	01-10-2018–05-03-2021	MC	
María Guadalupe Sánchez Zavalza	01-10-2021–	MC	
