= Mexican Communist Party =

Communist political party in Mexico (1917–1981)

Mexican Communist Party Partido Comunista Mexicano
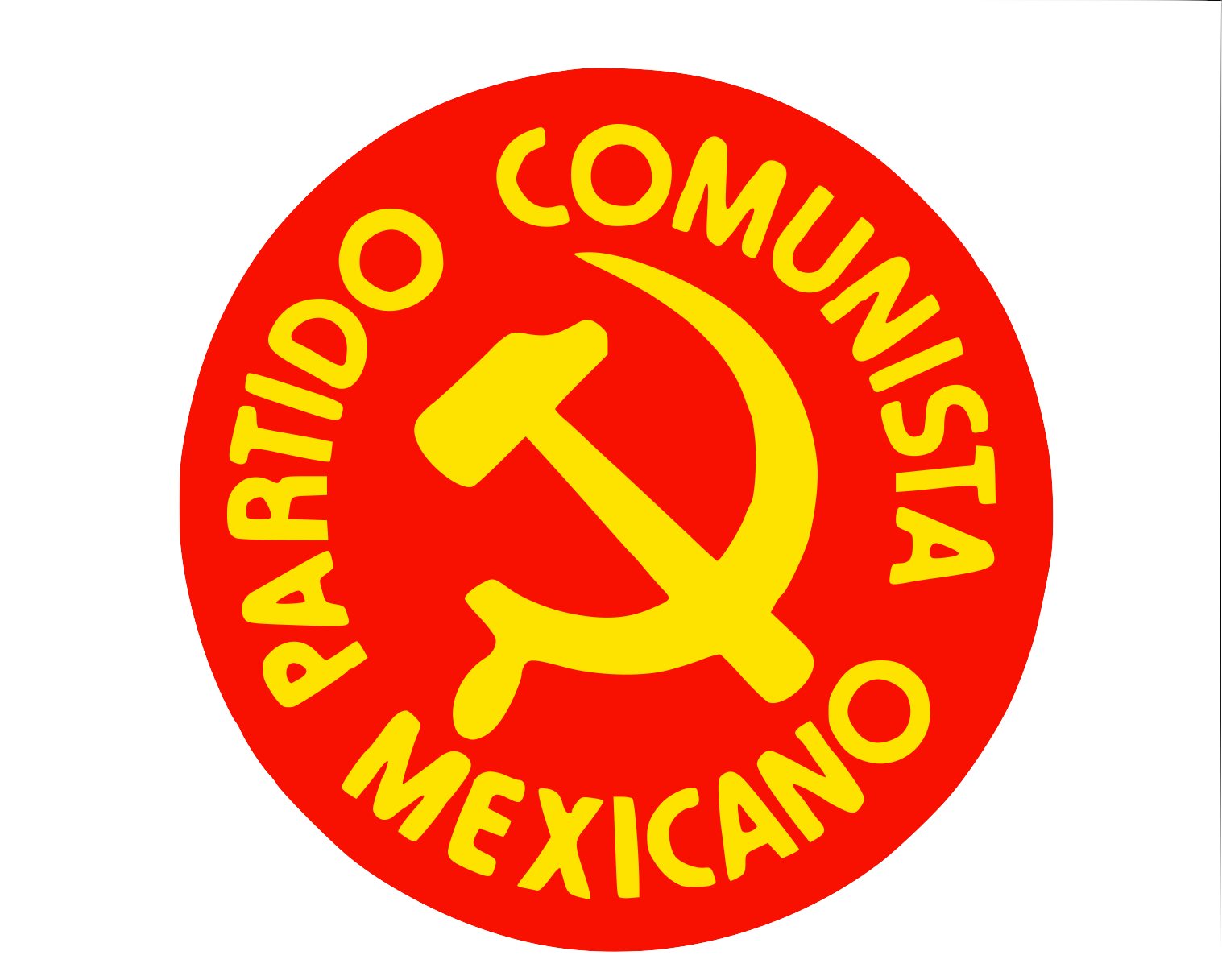
- Founder: M. N. Roy
- Founded: 31 December 1917
- Dissolved: 18 December 1981
- Merged into: Unified Socialist Party of Mexico
- Succeeded by: Communist Party of Mexico
- Membership: 50,000 (mid-1960s)
- Ideology: Communism; Marxism-Leninism; Socialism; Factions: Trotskyism
- Political position: Far-left

The Mexican Communist Party (Spanish: Partido Comunista Mexicano, PCM) was a Marxist-Leninist party in Mexico. It was founded in 1917 as the Socialist Workers' Party (Partido Socialista Obrero, PSO) by Manabendra Nath Roy, a left-wing Bengali revolutionary. The PSO changed its name to the Mexican Communist Party in November 1919. It was outlawed in 1925 by the government of Plutarco Elías Calles and remained illegal until 1935, during the presidency of the leftist Lázaro Cárdenas. The PCM saw the left wing of the nationalist regime that emerged from the Mexican Revolution—i.e. Cárdenas and his allies—as a progressive force to be supported. The PCM disappeared after helping form the Party of the Democratic Revolution, a split from the PRI led by the son of Lázaro Cárdenas, Cuauhtémoc Cárdenas.

The PCM lost its registration in 1946 because it did not meet new requirements for at least 30,000 registered members in at least 21 of Mexico's 31 states and the Federal District. It is not clear whether the party was unable to recruit enough members or whether, fearing repression, it refused to turn membership rolls over to the Secretary of the Interior, then in charge of elections.

Over the next 30 years, the party had some minor influence in the Confederation of Mexican Workers (CTM) and among the intelligentsia of Mexico City. In the mid-1960s the US State Department estimated the party membership to be approximately 50,000.

In 1976, the party nominated Valentín Campa as its presidential candidate, competing (unofficially) against José López Portillo. Following the electoral reform of 1977 that lowered the barrier for parties to get on the ballot, the PCM regained temporary registration for the 1979 mid-term elections. After its poor showing and a two decade-long period of moderation during which it adopted a "Eurocommunist" position, the PCM merged with three other far-left political parties in November 1981 and became the Unified Socialist Party of Mexico (PSUM). Most members of the PSUM then merged with somewhat more moderate left-wing groups to form the Mexican Socialist Party (PMS) in 1987. The PMS never competed in national elections alone, having joined the National Democratic Front (FDN)—a split from the ruling Revolutionary Institutional Party (PRI)—to support the presidential bid of Cuauhtémoc Cárdenas in 1988. What was the PMS was then absorbed into the newly formed Party of the Democratic Revolution (PRD) in 1989.

In 1994, former members of the PCM, along with members of the PRD and the PPS, formed the Communist Party of Mexico.

== Secretaries-General of the Mexican Communist Party ==
- 1927–1940 Hernán Laborde
- 1940–1959 Dionisio Encina
- 1959–1963 Collective Secretariat of the Mexican Communist Party
- 1963–1981 Arnoldo Martínez Verdugo

== See also ==
- Mexican Socialist Party
- Unified Socialist Party of Mexico
- List of political parties in Mexico
