= Operation Michoacán =

Anti-drug effort in Mexico

- Part of Mexican drug war
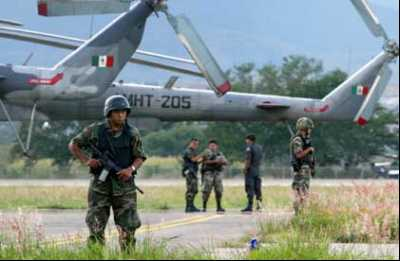
- Cooperation between the Mexican Air Force and the Mexican Army in the reconnaissance of cultivation areas in Michoacán in May 2007
Date	December 11, 2006 – ongoing (19 years, 8 months, 3 weeks and 1 day)
Location	Michoacán de Ocampo, Mexico
Result	Ongoing

Belligerents
Mexico: Mexican Army; Rurales; Mexican Navy; Mexican Naval Infantry; Mexican National Guard; Mexican Federal Police (dissolved in 2019, replaced by the National Guard); Attorney General of Mexico; SEIDO; Municipal and State Police; Independent civilian vigilante groups: (known as Community Police; with official support from the government, as of 2021); Grupos de Autodefensa Comunitaria; Focos Rojos (Since late 2019, in 27 out of the 113 municipalities in Michoacán)	La Nueva Familia Michoacana Organization (since 2011) La Familia Michoacana; Knights Templar Cartel (2010–2017, disbanded); Los Viagras; Los Blancos De Troya; Cárteles Unidos (Since 2010); Gulf Cartel; Sinaloa Cartel	Jalisco New Generation Cartel (Since 2013); Zicuirán New Generation Cartel (since March 15, 2020)	(2006-2012): Los Zetas; Juárez Cartel; Beltrán-Leyva Organization; Tijuana Cartel

Commanders and leaders
(Mexico) Claudia Sheinbaum (2024–present); (Mexico) Luis Cresencio Sandoval (2018–present); (Mexico) José Rafael Ojeda Durán (2018–present); (Michoacán) Alfredo Ramírez Bedolla (2021–present); Former commanders: (Mexico) Felipe Calderón; (Mexico) Enrique Peña Nieto; (Mexico) Andrés Manuel López Obrador; (Mexico) Guillermo Galván Galván; (Mexico) Salvador Cienfuegos; (Mexico) Mariano Francisco Saynez Mendoza; (Mexico) Vidal Francisco Soberón Sanz; (Michoacán) Lázaro Cárdenas Batel; (Michoacán) Leonel Godoy Rangel; (Michoacán) Fausto Vallejo; (Michoacán) Jesús Reyna García; (Michoacán) Salvador Jara Guerrero; (Michoacán) Silvano Aureoles Conejo	Nazario Moreno González †; José de Jesús Méndez Vargas (POW); Servando Gómez Martínez (POW); Dionicio Loya Plancarte (POW)	Unknown	Unknown

Strength
12,000	Unknown	Unknown	Unknown

Casualties and losses
60 soldiers killed 400 police officers killed	500 killed	Unknown	Unknown

Operation Michoacán (Spanish: Operativo Conjunto Michoacán) was a joint operation by Federal Police and the Mexican military to eliminate drug plantations and to combat drug trafficking. Initiated on December 11, 2006, the operation was supervised by The Secretary of Public Safety, Attorney General of Mexico, Secretary of the Interior, Mexican Navy and Mexican Army.

On some occasions, state and municipal police have participated despite not being part of it. The joint operation has distinguished itself as one of the operations against organized crime, drug trafficking in this case, which has employed the largest number of military and police elements, as well as most state forces.

== Background ==
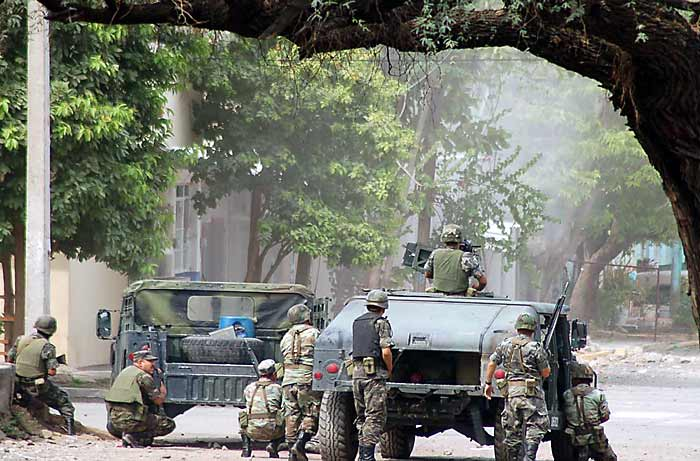
Mexican Army soldiers take cover during a gun battle in Apatzingan, Michoacán in August 2007.

The drug war in Michoacán began in the 1990s when the Milenio Cartel and the Amezcua Cartel started selling crystal methamphetamine imported from Colombia through alliances with the Medellín Cartel and the Cali Cartel. Subsequently, lieutenants from the Milenio Cartel defected to the Gulf Cartel, another major distributor of Colombian drugs in Mexico. As the drug trade expanded in Michoacán, the Gulf Cartel authorized a new enforcer group called Los Zetas in 2003. The Zetas and Gulf cartels formed alliances with a vigilante group known as La Familia Michoacana. This collaboration led to various drug-related crimes in Michoacán, including a 2004 prison break in Apatzingán to free members of the Gulf and Zetas cartels. After the arrest of Carlos Rosales Mendoza for his involvement in the prison raid, Nazario Moreno assumed leadership of La Familia and initiated a turf war against rival cartels in Michoacán, marking the onset of the drug war. Following a plan initiated by his predecessor Vicente Fox, President Felipe Calderón deployed 4,000 troops to Michoacán on December 12 to combat the escalating drug-related violence that had claimed over 500 lives. The military conducted operations targeting areas controlled by organized crime, carrying out raids, arrests, and establishing control points on highways and secondary roads. On May 8, 2007, in Apatzingan, Michoacán, soldiers from the 51st Infantry Battalion engaged drug traffickers, resulting in the death of 4 cartel gunmen and injuries to 3 soldiers.

== 2009 ==
=== Local government officials arrested ===
- In May 2009, federal officers detained 10 mayors of Michoacán and 20 other local officials suspected of being associated with the cartel

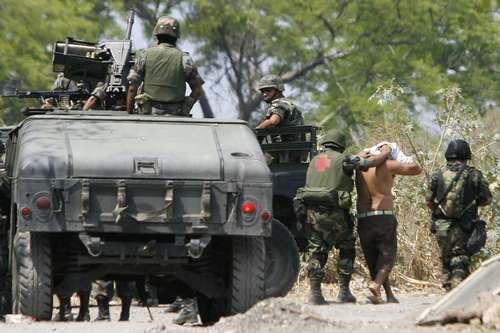
Mexican soldiers detain cartel suspects in Michoacán

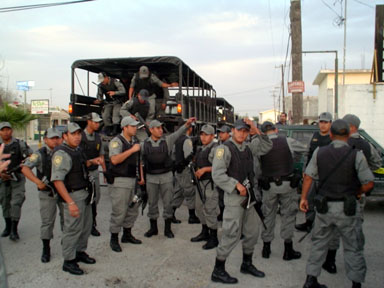
Federal Police forces arrive in search of cartel suspects.

=== Arrest of Arnoldo Rueda and retribution ===
- On July 11, The Federal Police trapped and arrested one of three of La Familia leaders. Arnoldo Rueda Medina a.k.a. La Minsa is one of three cartel lieutenants was captured in Morelia, Michoacán. On the same day as a response to the capture of Arnoldo Rueda, La Familia launched the biggest attacks in the history of organized crime against Federal Police and Military installations in 8 cities in the western part of Mexico. Even attacking the Federal Police building where Arnoldo was held in. Cartel hitmen were reported using fragmentation grenades, AK-47's and AR-15's in. Three Federal Police officers, two soldiers were reported killed and 18 wounded.
- On July 14, the bodies of 12 Federal Police officers that were investigating criminal activity in the area were found murdered and abandoned along a highway between Lázaro Cárdenas and Morelia

=== Government response ===
- On July 17, as a response to the violence, the federal government stepped up a plan to "surround" Michoacán by sea, air and land. The government sent 5,500 soldiers and federal police officers, also arriving were fully armed helicopters and vehicles to reinforce the 7,000 government forces already deployed in the state. Furthermore, 25 bases will be deployed for mobile operations on freeways and highways of the first order, which brings to Michoacán in adjacent areas of the states of Guanajuato, Guerrero, Colima, and Jalisco, where troops are participating in the various areas adjacent to the 12th Military Region. The government is considering building 67 mobile bases of operation, nine of joint operations by personnel of the Army and Federal Police, strengthening air support aircraft both fixed wing and rotary wing.

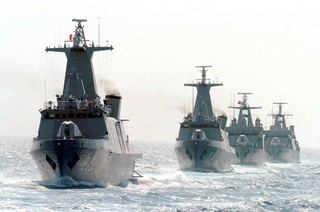
Mexican Navy corvettes will patrol the Michoacán coast line.

- On July 21, The army completed the reinforcement of "Joint Operation Michoacán" with 2,500 troops to assist the deployed 1,000 troops already in the state. Also the Secretariat of the Navy announced that the navy launched sea, air, and land surveillance operations at the coast and also sent 1,500 marines.
- On July 30, The Federal Police arrested "La Familia's" financial operator Armando Quintero Guerra a.k.a. "El Licenciado"(The Bachelor) and the cartels alleged leader Servando "La Tuta" Gomez girlfriend Lourdes Medina Hernández in Uruapan. The PFP also captured another financial operator of Nazario Moreno González a.k.a. "El Chayo".

=== Ongoing confrontations ===
- On July 30, SEDENA has reported that 6 cartel gunmen were killed in a confrontation with troops in the town of Guayameo in the municipality of Zirándaro. Soldiers from the 21st military zone were "attacked with firearms inside a home, so they proceeded to repel aggression." military officials said.
- On August 15, Federal Police forces captured a boss of La Familia, along with other 7 lieutenants. Héctor Manuel Oyarzabal Hernández a.k.a. "El Héctor" was in charge of the municipalities of Ixtapaluca, Chalco, Valle de Chalco and Ozumba in the State of Mexico. The operation succeeded without a shot being fired.
- On August 25, Federal Police forces captured Manuel Alejandro Sotelo Barrera a.k.a. "El Bolucho". He is supposed leader of La Familia's Leon, Guanajuato chapter and nephew of Servando Gómez a.k.a. "La Tuta". On the same day the military captured Luis Ricardo Magaña Mendoza a.k.a. "El 19 y medio" (19 and a half) another leader of the cartel and five other cartel members in Manzanillo, Colima.

== 2010 ==
- January 8 – during a routine patrol, troops were attacked by gunmen in a pickup vehicle, provoking a gunfight that lasted for various minutes in Michoacán. Four gunmen and one soldier were killed.
- January 30 – Five Federal Police officers were ambushed by gunmen while traveling on the Highway Occidente; seven federal officers were reported injured. The government scrambled federal helicopters, troops, and state police to find the ones responsible.
- April 24 – A three vehicle convoy carrying the Public Safety Secretary was attacked by gunmen which left two bodyguards and two bystanders dead. Hours later a police station in Morelia was attacked by grenades. The explosion damaged three vehicles.
- June 14 – Ten Federal Police officers were ambushed and killed while several others were injured during a firefight in Zitácuaro. The Federal Police managed to kill and injure the gunmen who are presumed to be part of La Familia Michoacana cartel. Immediately after the gunfight, army air and land units were dispatched to secure the area.
- June 16 – After the June 14 ambush attack on Federal Police officers, the Mexican Army doubled patrols in the rural areas of Zitácuaro.
- November 5 – After a suspected drug leader was trapped in Tzurumútaro (a little town located near Morelia), a series of consecutive attacks took place in Morelia. There, attacks consisting of narcobloqueos (narcoblocks, a series of run blocks) with cars on fire, with gunfights between the Federal Police, Mexican Army and gang members.

== 2012 ==
- February 3 – 4,000 additional Mexican Army troops arrive to the state of Michoacán. Troops were assigned to areas under the control of Knights Templar Cartel.

== 2013 ==
- May 22 - 6,000 Mexican Army troops arrive to the town of La Ruana, Michoacan to assigned raids and patrolling in the town under the control of the Knights Templar Cartel.

== 2014 ==
- January 22 - Enrique Plancarte Solís's daughter flees Mexico to her home in Chicago, IL due to posing a selfie on Twitter wearing a nun's costume that resembles the Knight's Templar Cartel coat of arms.
- January 26 - Vigilante group legally joins Federal Police and Army.
- January 27 - Dionisio Loya Plancarte is captured.
- February 2 - Enrique Plancarte Solís's lawyer is captured.
- February 8 - Self-Defense group reclaims Apatzingan. Antonio Plancarte Solís is captured.

== 2015 ==
- February 27-Servando Gomez Martinez is captured by Federal Police, PGR, and SEIDO agents in Morelia.

== 2016 ==
- September 6 – a Mexican cartel gang shoots down a helicopter in the western state of Michaocán. The helicopter was shot down in the region of Apatzingán, a city located in Tierra Caliente (Hot Land), a region that has been beset by drug violence and vigilante justice for years.

== Controversy ==
Operation Michoacán is the first stage of the so-called War Against Drug Trafficking implemented by the federal government of President Felipe Calderón. The joint operation has been questioned about the human rights violations that may have occurred, given the military presence among the civilian population of the state of Michoacán. The chairman of the National Commission on Human Rights, José Luis Soberanes, in May 2007, charged that had been at least 53 complaints of human rights violations by the military to the civilian population.
