= Morelia grenade attacks =

2008 grenade attack in Mexico

2008 morelia grenade attacks
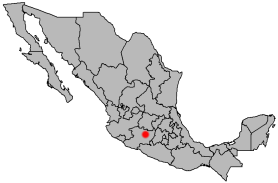
- Location: 19.7024°N 101.1936°W; Morelia, Michoacán
- Date: 15 September 2008
- Target: People in city down town
- Attack type: Grenade
- Deaths: At least 8
- Injuries: At least 100
- Perpetrators: La Familia Michoacana, blamed Los Zetas

The Morelia grenade attacks took place on 15 September 2008 on the occasion of the Mexican Independence Day anniversary when thousands of people were gathered in the Plaza Melchor Ocampo, the main square of Morelia, Michoacán. Shortly after the Grito (a harangue) in that city, led by Governor Leonel Godoy, two grenades were thrown into the crowds, killing at least eight people and injuring more than 100.

== The attacks ==
The first blast was reported shortly after 23:00, on the Plaza itself, as the governor was intoning the traditional vivas to the heroes of the nation; the second took place some minutes later, in a sidestreet located four blocks away.

Two further explosions were reported in the immediate aftermath: one at 01:00, leaving the city along the highway to Salamanca, Guanajuato; and a fourth at 01:15, in the Santa María district in the vicinity of Morelia's bandera monumental.

=== Aftermath ===
Although the main line of investigation points towards drug trafficking, specifically the probable responsibility of the criminal organization "La Familia" that operates mainly in the state of Michoacán, it has distanced itself from the events by placing banners in various points of the capital Morelia.7 Likewise, Los Zetas, another criminal organization and armed wing of the Gulf Cartel, distanced itself from the attack and blamed La Familia for being the author of the detonations.8 For its part, the Mexican guerrilla organization called the Popular Revolutionary Army (EPR) issued a statement also disassociating itself from the attack.

=== Investigation ===
On September 25, 2008, with the help of an anonymous tip, three suspected perpetrators of the attacks were arrested in Apatzingán, Michoacán by agents of the Federal Investigation Agency and SIEDO.10 The detainees confessed to being part of the criminal drug trafficking organization Los Zetas.10 A few days after their capture and videotaped confession and without their lawyers present, the detainees retracted their statements and claimed that they were tortured into pleading guilty, a modus operandi of Genaro García Luna's AFI.

== Suspects ==
The police have blamed drug cartels for the grenade attacks, specifically the La Familia Michoacana gang. La Familia denied it and instead blamed Los Zetas. A week after the attacks, police from SIEDO and the Federal Investigations Agency arrested three men of the Los Zetas gang accused of throwing the grenades. However, the suspects were proven guilty for eleven years until 2019, when a federal corrections judge proved them innocent. They were proven innocent because they had not been present in Morelia the night of September 15, 2008 and had been subject to kidnapping and false imprisonment by orders of Servando Gomez Martinez, José de Jesús Méndez Vargas, and Nazario Moreno. They had been present in the city of Lázaro Cárdenas, Michoacán and had been taken to an unincorporated town in the Apatzingan municipality. They were tortured and tied up to a tree until agents from the Procuraduría General de la República came, who were paid 10,000,000 pesos to arrest them.

=== Arrest of suspect ===
Finally, in May 2015, almost 7 years after the events, a judge granted the detainees an injunction and they were released. The judge based his decision on expert examinations that confirmed the version that they had been tortured. He also noted other irregularities.

== Context ==
Morelia is the home town of President Felipe Calderón of the PAN, although the state of Michocán has traditionally been controlled by the opposition PRI and PRD. Michoacán has, since Calderón took office, been one of the federal government's focal points in its anti-drug efforts and initial suspicions indicated that the atrocity was probably the work of the drugs cartels, either part of a battle for territory or as a warning to the government. Condemnation of the incident across the country was unanimous, as such tactics of the drug lords in attacking random citizen congregations was unprecedented in Mexican history.
