= Dionisio Loya Plancarte =

Mexican drug lord

- Born: 21 October 1955 (age 71); Apatzingán, Michoacán, Mexico
- Other name: El Tío ('The Uncle')
- Employer: Knights Templar Cartel
- Criminal status: Captured
- Relatives: Enrique Plancarte Solís (Nephew)

Dionisio Loya Plancarte (born 21 October 1955) is a Mexican drug lord and high-ranking leader of the Knights Templar Cartel, a quasi-religious criminal organization based in the state of Michoacán. He is the uncle of Enrique Plancarte Solís, another former high-ranking leader of the cartel. Since 2009, he was listed as one of Mexico's 37 most-wanted drug lords, with a $30 million pesos (US$2.3 million) bounty for information leading to his capture. He was arrested by the Mexican Army in Morelia, Michoacán on 27 January 2014.

== Criminal career ==
Dionisio Loya Plancarte was born on 21 October 1955 in Apatzingán, Michoacán, Mexico. During the 1980s, organized crime activities in the Mexican state of Michoacán were overseen by a group known as La Empresa, which was founded by Carlos Rosales Mendoza. By 2006, La Empresa was transformed into La Familia Michoacana following disagreements with the Gulf Cartel and Los Zetas in Michoacán. Among the founders of the new cartel were Nazario Moreno González (alias "El Chayo"), Servando Gómez Martínez (alias "La Tuta"), Enrique Plancarte Solís (alias "La Chiva"), Arnoldo Rueda Medina (alias "La Minsa"), José de Jesús Méndez Vargas (alias "El Chango"), Loya Plancarte (alias "El Tío"), among others. Loya Plancarte is the uncle of Plancarte Solís. Unlike other traditional drug trafficking organizations in Mexico, La Familia Michoacana also posed as a vigilante and religious group. Its members were given "bibles" written by Moreno González with saying and conduct guidelines. At the same time, however, the cartel was responsible for shipping multi-ton shipments of narcotics to the United States from Mexico, including marijuana, cocaine, heroin, and methamphetamine. During the 2000s, Loya Plancarte's organization was among the fastest growing criminal organizations in Mexico; besides drug trafficking, the cartel diversified its criminal agenda by controlling numerous "counterfeiting, extortion, kidnapping, armed robbery, prostitution and car dealership" rings in Michoacán and its neighboring states. By mid-2009, La Familia had managed to establish a foothold in about 20 to 30 urban areas across the United States. While he was at large, the Mexican government listed Loya Plancarte in 2009 as one of country's 37 most-wanted drug lords, offering a $30 million pesos (US$2.3 million) bounty for information leading to his capture.

As a high-ranking lieutenant in La Familia Michoacana, Loya Plancarte coordinated the buying of narcotics, managed the cartel's finances, and took on the role of the organization's press figure and spokesperson. He managed the cartel's public relations and justified kidnappings and killings by stating that they were done to protect law-abiding citizens. In July 2009, he allegedly coordinated an attack that killed 12 Mexican federal police officers in Michoacán two days following the arrest of Arnoldo Rueda, one of La Familia Michoacana's leaders. In early 2010, La Familia Michaocana leaders formed an alliance with the Gulf Cartel and Sinaloa Cartel in opposition to Los Zetas, which had separated from their former allies, the Gulf Cartel. Los Zetas, on the other hand, joined forces with the Juárez Cartel, Tijuana Cartel, and the Beltrán Leyva Cartel. In December 2010, La Familia Michoacana's spiritual leader Moreno González was killed in a two-day shootout with the Mexican federal police in Michoacán. With his death, Loya Plancarte was placed as a top security priority by the Mexican government. The death of the leader led to an internal power struggle within La Familia Michoacana; Gómez Martínez, Planarte Solís, and Loya Plantarte left the criminal organization and formed the Knights Templar Cartel in 2011 to counter forces with Méndez Vargas, who remained in La Familia Michoacana.

In a gunfight between gunmen of the Knights Templar and soldiers of the Mexican Army, Loya Plancarte was reported dead on 15 March 2013.

== Kingpin Act sanction ==
On 25 February 2010, the United States Department of the Treasury sanctioned Loya Plancarte under the Foreign Narcotics Kingpin Designation Act (sometimes referred to simply as the "Kingpin Act"), for his involvement in drug trafficking along with twenty-one other international criminals and ten foreign entities. The act prohibited U.S. citizens and companies from doing any kind of business activity with him, and virtually froze all his assets in the U.S.

== Arrest ==
Loya Plancarte was arrested by the Mexican Army in Morelia, Michoacán on 27 January 2014. He was transferred to SEIDO, Mexico's organized crime investigatory agency, following his capture. On 29 January 2014, he was transferred by federal agents to the Federal Social Readaptation Center No. 1 (commonly referred to as "Altiplano"), a maximum security prison in Almoloya de Juárez, State of Mexico.

== Bibliography ==
- Rexton Kan, Paul (2012). Cartels at War: Mexico's Drug-Fueled Violence and the Threat to U. S. National Security. Potomac Books, Inc. ISBN 978-1597977074.
