= Arnoldo (disambiguation) =

Arnoldo is a masculine given name. It may also refer to:

- Arnoldo Mondadori Editore, Italian publishing company
- Arnoldo's Ristorantino, 2021 Argentine children's television series
