= Arnoldo =

Arnoldo is an Italian and Spanish masculine given name. It is the Italian and Spanish spelling of Arnold. Notable people with the name include:

== First name ==
- Arnoldo Alemán (born 1946), Nicaraguan politician
- Arnoldo José Avilés García (born 1968), Honduran politician
- Arnoldo Berruti (1902–1967), Italian water polo player
- Arnoldo Camu (1937–1973), Chilean lawyer and political activist
- Arnoldo Castillo (1922–2005), Argentine politician
- Arnoldo Castro (1939–2023), Mexican baseball player
- Arnoldo de Winkelried Bertoni (1878–1973), Paraguayan zoologist
- Arnaldo Ferraguti (1862–1925), Italian painter
- Arnoldo Ferreto, 20th-century Costa Rican politician
- Arnoldo Foà (1916–2014), Italian actor
- Arnoldo Frigessi (born 1959), Italian statistician and academic
- Arnoldo Gabaldón (1909–1990), Venezuelan physician and politician
- Arnoldo Granella (1939–2022), French football player
- Arnoldo Herrera (born 1996), Costa Rican swimmer
- Arnoldo Iguarán (born 1957), Colombian football player
- Arnoldo Jimenez (born 1982), American fugitive
- Arnoldo Kraus (1951–2025), Mexican physician and academic
- Arnoldo López Echandi (born 1941), Costa Rican politician
- Arnoldo Martínez Verdugo (1925–2013), Mexican politician
- Arnoldo Mondadori (1889–1971), Italian publisher
- Arnoldo Ochoa González (born 1951), Mexican politician
- Arnoldo Ortelli (1913–1986), Swiss footballer
- Arnoldo Parés (born 1922), Argentine boxer
- Arnoldo Pekelharing (1936–2001), Argentine sailor
- Arnoldo Penzkofer (1959–2008), Paraguayan basketball player
- Arnoldo Rábago (born 1942), Mexican sailor
- Arnoldo Rueda Medina (born 1969), Mexican drug trafficker
- Arnoldo Sartorio (1853–1936), German composer
- Arnoldo André Tinoco (born 1961), Costa Rican politician and diplomat
- Arnoldo Torres, American journalist
- Arnoldo Vizcaíno, 21st-century Mexican politician

== Middle name ==
- Adolfo Arnoldo Majano (born 1938), Salvadoran military and political figure
