= Arnoldo Rueda Medina =

Mexican drug trafficker (born 1969)

- Born: 15 December 1969 (age 56) or 27 December 1969 (age 56); Paracuaro, Michoacán, Mexico
- Other name: La Minsa
- Occupation: La Familia Michoacana leader
- Status: In prison (Penal del Altiplano)
- Criminal charges: Organized crime, drug trafficking

Arnoldo Rueda Medina (born 15 December 1969) is a former Mexican drug lord and high-ranking leader of La Familia Michoacana, a drug trafficking organization which is based in Michoacán, Mexico.

Rueda Medina was allegedly in charge of operations under La Familia leaders Nazario Moreno González and José de Jesús Méndez Vargas, who are both on Mexico's most-wanted list of drug suspects.

== Career ==
=== Criminality ===
Rueda Medina was born on 15 December 1969 in Parácuaro, a municipality of the state of Michoacán, and first worked as a tortilla seller before deciding to start his criminal career by stealing automobiles in the year 2000. In 2004, he became the La Familia Michoacana's hitmen lieutenant responsible for tracking down cartel rivals and ordering gunmen to kill members of the Milenio Cartel, which had an alliance with the Sinaloa Cartel.

He reportedly started working for the cartel in 2000, when the drug lords Carlos Rosales Mendoza, José de Jesús Méndez Vargas, and Nazario Moreno González were fighting against the Valencia brothers of the Milenio organization for the control of the smuggling routes in western Mexico. During the mid-2000s, Rosales Mendoza headed the cartel and aligned with the Gulf Cartel and Los Zetas to fight the Milenio Cartel. But after the arrests of Rosales Mendoza and of the Gulf Cartel leader Osiel Cárdenas Guillén, Rueda Medina's group broke relations with Los Zetas along with Méndez Vargas and Moreno González. By 2006, he was in charge of coordinating the cartel's narcotics fabrication and smuggling operations. He was also responsible for assigning regional leaders of the cartel, contacting international drug suppliers, and infiltrating several police forces where La Familia Michoacana held a stronghold.

=== Arrest ===
After six months of police intelligence, Rueda Medina was arrested on 11 July 2009 by elements of the Mexican Federal Police while he was arriving at his residence in the capital city of Morelia, Michoacán.

Minutes later, a group of more than two dozen gunmen tossed fragmentation grenades and opened fire on the federal police offices where Rueda Medina was being held. Rueda Medina was then taken to Mexico City by dozens of policemen and soldiers. A few hours after Rueda's arrest, convoys of heavily armed gunmen ambushed federal forces across the western state of Michoacán. The gunmen tossed hand grenades and opened fire on police stations and at the hotel installations where the officers slept in six major Michoacan cities. There were also attacks in the states of Guerrero and Guanajuato. Five federal officers and two soldiers were killed that day, with ten federal policemen wounded by the reprisals.

Two days later, on 13 July, La Familia gunmen continued the retaliation with an ambush to a police bus, killing 12 federal agents. The 11 men and one woman had been kidnapped, tortured, and killed while off-duty as a retaliation attack for the arrest of Rueda Medina. The killing of the agents, whose bodies were found along with a warning note, showed that La Familia Michoacana was eager to directly attack the Federal government of Mexico.

Rueda has been convicted of multiple crimes and is being held at Penal del Altiplano, a maximum security prison.

== Kingpin Act sanction ==
On 25 February 2010, the United States Department of the Treasury sanctioned Rueda Medina under the Foreign Narcotics Kingpin Designation Act (sometimes referred to simply as the "Kingpin Act"), for his involvement in drug trafficking along with twenty-one other international criminals and ten foreign entities. The act prohibited U.S. citizens and companies from doing any kind of business activity with him, and virtually froze all his assets in the U.S.

== See also ==
- War on drugs
- Mexican drug war
- Mérida Initiative
