= Immigration Reform and Control Act of 1986 =

Legislation changing US immigration law

- Acronyms (colloquial): IRCA
- Nicknames: Simpson–Mazzoli Act/Reagan Amnesty
- Enacted by: the 99th United States Congress
- Effective: Signed into law by Ronald Reagan on November 6, 1986

Citations
- Public law: Pub. L. 99–603
- Statutes at Large: 100 Stat. 3445

Codification
- Titles amended: 8 U.S.C.: Aliens and Nationality
- U.S.C. sections amended: 8 U.S.C. ch. 12 § 1101 et seq.

Legislative history
- Introduced in the Senate as S. 1200 by Alan Simpson (R–WY) on May 23, 1985; Committee consideration by Senate Judiciary, Senate Budget; Passed the Senate on September 19, 1985 (69–30); Passed the House on October 9, 1986 (voice vote after incorporating H.R. 3810, passed 230–166); Reported by the joint conference committee on October 14, 1986; agreed to by the House on October 15, 1986 (238–173) and by the Senate on October 17, 1986 (63–24); Signed into law by President Ronald Reagan on November 6, 1986

United States Supreme Court cases
- McNary v. Haitian Refugee Center, Inc., 498 U.S. 479 (1991); Reno v. Catholic Social Services, Inc., 509 U.S. 43 (1993); Hoffman Plastic Compounds, Inc. v. National Labor Relations Board, 535 U.S. 137 (2002); Chamber of Commerce v. Whiting, 563 U.S. 582 (2011); Arizona v. United States, 567 U.S. 387 (2012); Kansas v. Garcia, No. 17-834, 589 U.S. ___ (2020)

The Immigration Reform and Control Act (IRCA or the Simpson–Mazzoli Act) was passed by the 99th United States Congress and signed into law by U.S. President Ronald Reagan on November 6, 1986.

The Immigration Reform and Control Act legalized most undocumented immigrants who had arrived in the country prior to January 1, 1982. The act altered U.S. immigration law by making it illegal to knowingly hire undocumented immigrants, and establishing financial and other penalties for companies that employed undocumented immigrants.

Nearly three million people applied for legalization under the IRCA. Through the update in the registry date along with the LAW and SAW programs enacted by IRCA, approximately 2.7 million people were ultimately approved for permanent residence.

== Legislative background and description ==
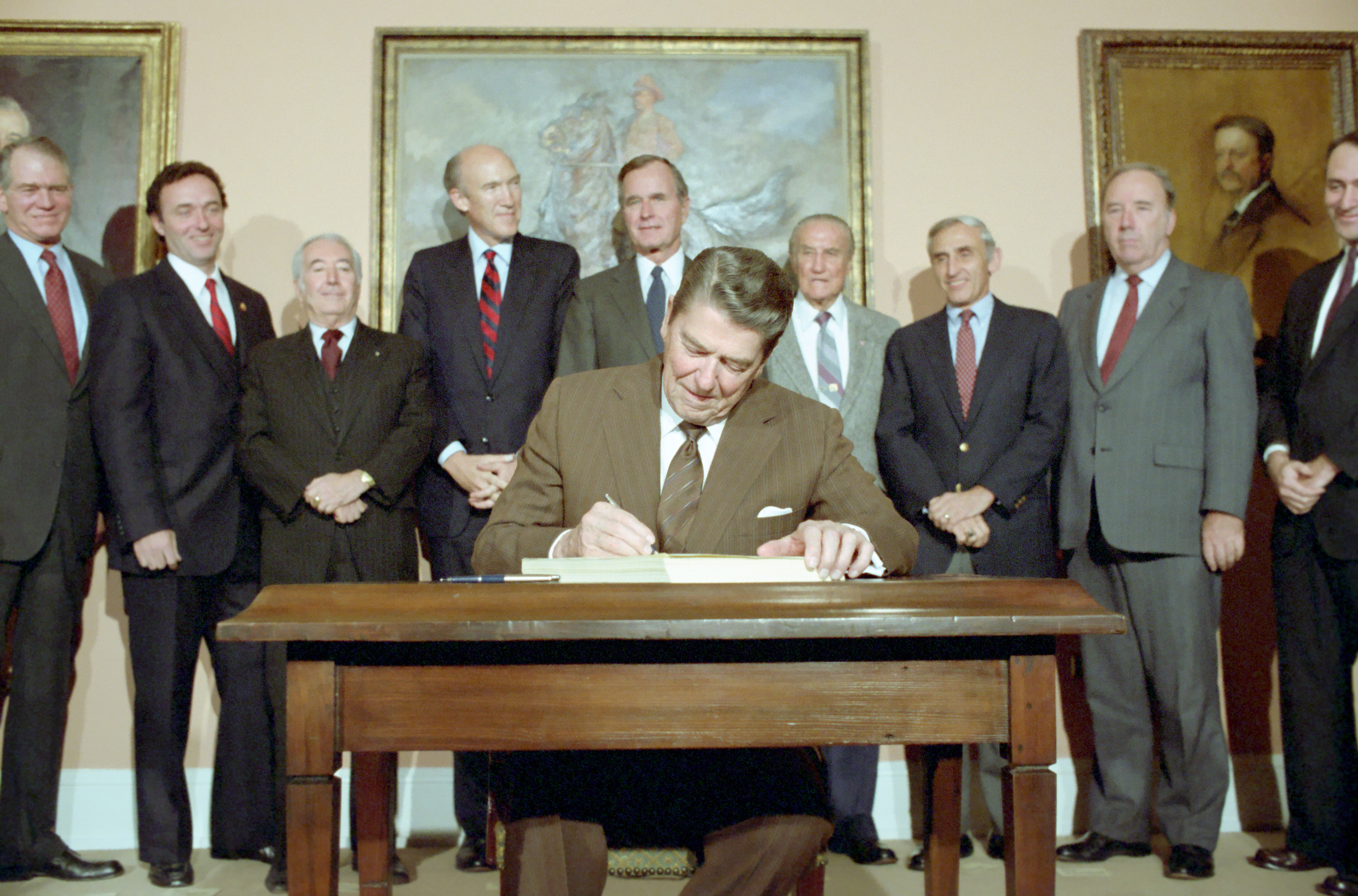
President Ronald Reagan signs the Immigration Reform and Control Act of 1986 in the Roosevelt Room.

Romano L. Mazzoli was a Democratic Representative from Kentucky and Alan K. Simpson was a Republican Senator from Wyoming who chaired their respective immigration subcommittees in Congress. Their effort was assisted by the recommendations of the bipartisan Commission on Immigration Reform, chaired by Rev. Theodore Hesburgh, then President of the University of Notre Dame.

The first Simpson–Mazzoli Bill was reported out of the House and Senate Judiciary Committees. The bill failed to be received by the House, but civil rights advocates were concerned over the potential for abuse and discrimination against Hispanics and growers' groups rallied for additional provisions for foreign labor; the United States Chamber of Commerce persistently opposed sanctions against employers. The second Simpson–Mazzoli Bill eventually reached both chambers in 1985 but fell down on the cost issue in the conference committee. That year was a major turning point for attempts to change. Workplace resistance to workplace fines started to subside, partially owing to the law's "affirmative protection" provision, which expressly freed employers from the duty to verify the validity of workers' records.

Also, agricultural employers shifted their focus from opposition to employer sanctions to a concerted campaign to secure alternative sources of foreign labor. As opposition to employer sanctions waned and growers' lobbying efforts for extensive temporary worker programs intensified, agricultural worker programs began to outrank employer sanctions as the most controversial part of reform.

President Ronald Reagan did not make immigration a major focus of his administration. However, he came to support the package of reforms sponsored by Simpson and Mazzoli and signed the Immigration Reform and Control Act into law in November 1986. Upon signing the act at a ceremony held beside the newly-refurbished Statue of Liberty, Reagan said, "The legalization provisions in this act will go far to improve the lives of a class of individuals who now must hide in the shadows, without access to many of the benefits of a free and open society. Very soon many of these men and women will be able to step into the sunlight and, ultimately, if they choose, they may become Americans."

=== Provisions ===
The act required employers to attest to their employees' immigration status and made it illegal to hire or recruit unauthorized immigrants knowingly. The act also legalized certain seasonal agricultural undocumented migrants and undocumented migrants who entered the United States before January 1, 1982 and had resided there continuously without the penalty of a fine, back taxes due, and admission of guilt. Candidates were required to prove that they were not guilty of any crime, had been in the country before January 1, 1982, and possessed at least a minimal knowledge about U.S. history and government and the English language.

The law established financial and other penalties for those employing undocumented migrants, under the theory that low prospects for employment would reduce undocumented migration. These sanctions would apply only to employers who had more than three employees and did not make a sufficient effort to determine the legal status of their workers. Regulations promulgated under the Act introduced the I-9 form to ensure that all employees presented documentary proof of their legal eligibility to accept employment in the United States.

By splitting the H-2 visa category created by the Immigration and Nationality Act of 1952, the 1986 law created the H-2A visa and H-2B visa categories, for temporary agricultural and non-agricultural workers, respectively.

=== Reagan executive action ===
The Immigration Reform and Control Act did not address the status of children of undocumented migrants who were eligible for the amnesty program. In 1987, Reagan used his executive authority to legalize the status of minor children of parents granted amnesty under the immigration overhaul, announcing a blanket deferral of deportation for children under 18 who were living in a two-parent household with both parents legalizing or with a single parent who was legalizing. That action affected an estimated 100,000 families.

== Impact ==
=== Amnesty ===
The passing of the 1986 Immigration Reform and Control Act allowed for an update in the registry date. Registry in the United States is a stipulation within immigration law that allows undocumented immigrants to apply for permanent resident status if they entered the country before the established registry date and have remained in the country since, along with other specific requirements. This provision was enacted through the Registry Act of 1929, and it has been updated four times since. IRCA changed the registry date from June 30, 1948 to January 1, 1972, allowing for the legalization of nearly 60,000 undocumented immigrants from 1986 to 1989 alone. The registry date has not been updated since 1986, which has resulted in an exponential decrease of immigrants eligible for a path to citizenship through the registry date provision. For instance, from 2015 to 2019, only 305 individuals were granted legal status through the 1972 registry date. Several political figures and immigration activists advocate for an advance in the current entry deadline, which would allow for the legalization of millions of long-term undocumented immigrants.

In addition to the update in the registry date, the Immigration Reform and Control Act provided amnesty to two groups of applicants. Migrants who had been unlawfully residing in the United States since before January 1, 1982 (LAWs) were legalized under Section 245A of the Immigration and Nationality Act (INA), while immigrants employed in seasonal agricultural work for a minimum of 90 days in the year prior to May, 1986 (SAWs) were legalized under Section 210A of the INA. Nearly three million people applied for legalization under the IRCA. Through the update in the registry date along with the LAW and SAW programs enacted by IRCA, approximately 2.7 million people were ultimately approved for permanent residence.

A 2025 study found that the IRCA did not lead to uncontrolled "chain migration". Each Mexican who achieved legal status through the IRCA "was responsible for the subsequent immigration and legal admission of one relative, in total, through 2019. Most sponsored relatives were immediate family, and the adult sponsorship rate is inconsistent with out-of-control chain migration."

=== On labor market ===
According to one study, the IRCA caused some employers to discriminate against workers who appeared foreign, resulting in a small reduction in overall Hispanic employment. There is no statistical evidence that a reduction in employment correlated to unemployment in the economy as a whole or was separate from the general unemployment population statistics. Another study stated that if employees were hired, wages were being lowered to compensate employers for the perceived risk of hiring foreigners.

The hiring process also changed as employers turned to indirect hiring through subcontractors. "Under a subcontracting agreement, a U.S. citizen or resident alien contractually agrees with an employer to provide a specific number of workers for a certain period of time to undertake a defined task at a fixed rate of pay per worker." "By using a subcontractor the firm is not held liable since the workers are not employees. The use of a subcontractor decreases a worker's wages since a portion is kept by the subcontractor. This indirect hiring is imposed on everyone regardless of legality."

=== On illegal immigration ===
Despite the passage of the act, the population of undocumented immigrants rose from 5 million in 1986 to 11.1 million in 2013. In 1982, the Supreme Court forbade schools to deny services based on undocumented immigration status in Plyler v. Doe. In 1986, Reagan signed the Emergency Medical Treatment and Active Labor Act (EMTALA), which forbade hospitals from denying emergency care services based on immigration status.

Illegal immigration occurs when an individual enters the U.S. in any way without inspection from border personnel, or by overstaying a temporary visa. Researchers and immigration enforcement institutions use apprehensions data to estimate the number of undocumented immigrants present within the U.S. Customs and Border Protection (CBP) define apprehensions as, "the physical control or temporary detainment of a person who is not lawfully in the U.S. which may or may not result in an arrest".

In the years after IRCA (1986–1989), illegal immigration decreased slightly before returning to pre-IRCA levels. Multiple studies estimate the initial decrease as a result of legalization of previously undocumented immigrants who illegally crossed back-and-forth between the U.S. and Mexico continually (known as circular immigration) now being able to do so legally, subsequently avoiding apprehension. A long-term study published in 2011 analyzed border apprehensions from 1977 to 2000 and found that the decade after the IRCA amnesty program, apprehensions along the U.S.-Mexico border slightly decreased. Multiple studies also found that neither the amnesty provided under IRCA, nor the potential for a future amnesty program, encouraged illegal immigration in the long-term.

While IRCA did not encourage illegal immigration, it failed to curb it. Some attribute this failure to a lack of focus on key determinants of immigration. A 2007 study in Hinckley Journal of Politics titled, The Ephemeral Immigration Reform and Control Act of 1986: Its Formation, Failure and Future Implications, defined these determinants as, "relative US wage levels, labor market flexibility, probability and cost of crossing the border, ability to find work, demographic changes, political turmoil, demand for labor in growing sectors, existing immigration networks and family relationships". The same study highlighted the failed attempt of employer sanctions that established criminal and civil punishments on employers for knowingly hiring or continuing to employ undocumented immigrants. These sanctions resulted in little governmental oversight and enforcement, a lack of motivation and economic incentive on the part of employers to ensure all employees legal status prior to hiring (also known as E-Verify), and in some cases an open acceptance and willingness to pay the fines imposed. While immigration policy design in the U.S. can and does have an effect on apprehensions and migratory patterns, external factors and determinants that exist outside of U.S. immigration policy also influence migratory flows and subsequent legal or illegal immigration. A study by Joshua Linder titled, The Amnesty Effect: Evidence from the 1986 Immigration Reform and Control Act, found that the "economic conditions in Mexico have the greatest impact on the flow of undocumented immigrants". Others attribute IRCA's failure to stem illegal immigration to its focus on tougher border enforcement. Border Patrol focused its efforts on common entry areas along the U.S.-Mexico border; however, this pushed migrants to more rural, less-policed areas along the border and encouraged new tactics such as the use of "coyotes" and underground tunnels.

=== On crime ===
A 2015 study found that the legalization of 3 million immigrants reduced crime by 3 to 5%, primarily property crime. Its author asserts that to be caused by greater job market opportunities for the immigrants. Contrastingly, a 2014 study in the American Economic Journal: Economic Policy found that IRCA likely caused an increase in crime, especially felony drug charges, by restricting the employment opportunities for unauthorized migrants. Its authors, in a 2015 journal article, further argue that the changes in felony charges could be motivated by the police's shift in treatment and persecution of immigrants after IRCA was enacted. This is particularly accurate for Hispanic individuals, who accounted for approximately three-fourths of the 2.7 million immigrants that received a legal status through the LAW and SAW programs included in IRCA. Others have found a direct relation between the passing of IRCA in 1986 with the decline in arrests along the U.S-Mexico border, explained by the amnesty provided to those non-citizens eligible that would have otherwise been part of the seasonal immigration flow.

== Structure of the act and relationship to United States Code ==
Following the Short title, the IRCA is divided into seven Titles (I through VII). Title I is divided into parts A, B, and C, and Title III is divided into parts A and B. The IRCA affects 8 USC 1101. Additional portions of the U.S. Code created or amended by the IRCA include, but are not necessarily limited to:

- Parts A and B of Title I: 8 USC 1324, 8 USC 1324a, 8 USC 1324b, 18 USC 1546, 8 USC 1321, 8 USC 1357, 8 USC 1255.
- Part C of Title I: 42 USC 1320b-7
- Title II: 8 USC 1255a
- Title III: 8 USC 1186, 8 USC 1152, 8 USC 1187

== See also ==
- Immigration to the United States
- DREAM Act
- Foreign Worker Visa
- Arnoldo Torres
- Labor economics
- History of immigration to the United States
