= La Nueva Familia Michoacana Organization =

Mexican criminal organization

La Nueva Familia Michoacana
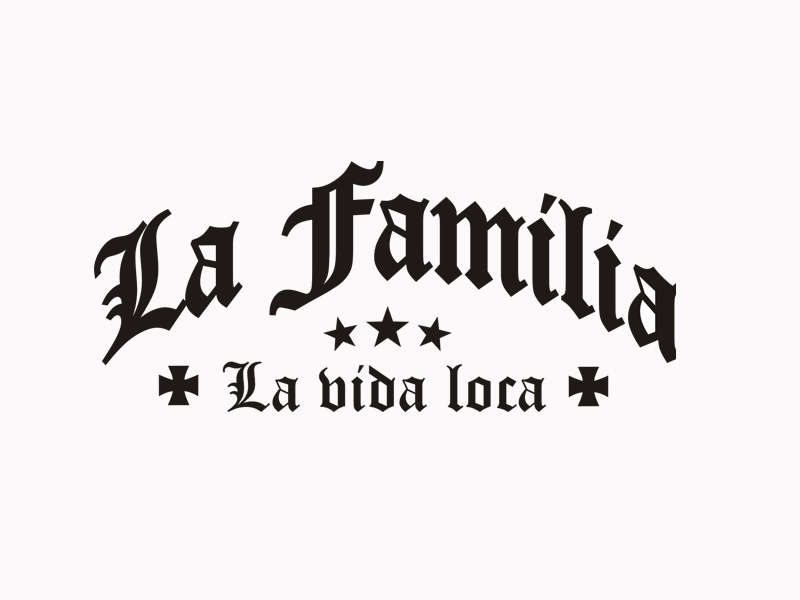
- La Familia logo
- Founded: 2011
- Founded by: Johnny Hurtado Olascoaga and José Alfredo Hurtado Olascoaga
- Founding location: Michoacan, Mexico
- Years active: 2011—present
- Territory: Mexico: Michoacan, Edomex, Morelos, Jalisco, Guerrero. United States: Texas, New Mexico, North Carolina, Georgia, Washington, D.C.
- Membership (est.): 10,936 (2022)
- Activities: Drug trafficking, murder, extortion, kidnapping, blackmailing, robbery, illegal mining
- Allies: La Familia Michoacana
- Rivals: CJNG

La Nueva Familia Michoacana (LNFM; English: The New Michoacan Family) or La Nueva Familia), is a Mexican criminal organization and U.S.-designated Foreign Terrorist Organization that specializes in illegal drug trafficking, illegal mining, and extortion. It is currently headed by Johnny Hurtado Olascoaga, alias "El Pez", and his brother and José Alfredo Hurtado Olascoaga, alias "El Fresa". The organization formed as a splinter group in 2011 after the original La Familia Michoacana lost their power in 2010 with the formation of the Knights Templar Cartel and with Nazario Moreno's suspected death (he was not proven dead until 2014 with a DNA test).

La Nueva Familia Michoacana is mainly dedicated to drug trafficking and fighting the CJNG cartel for control of the Tierra Caliente region in Michoacán and Guerrero. According to the United States Department of the Treasury, the organization is primarily involved in the distribution of cocaine, fentanyl, and methamphetamine to the United States, but it is also involved in growing marijuana and poppies. Many of its leaders have been arrested for threatening and blackmailing people on social media. LNFM operates in at least 35 municipalities in southern Mexico.

== Social media threats ==
In 2019, a leader from the cell called El Zarco threatened El Mencho by telling him they were going to kill his hitmen by the Balsas River. The threat went viral when CJNG members threatened to assassinate El Zarco a few weeks later.

== Sanctions ==
In November 2022, the United States Department of the Treasury sanctioned La Nueva Familia Michoana and its alleged leaders Johnny Hurtado Olascoaga and Jose Alfredo Hurtado Olascoaga pursuant to Executive Order 14059. The Treasury alleges the group is implicated in a mix of criminal and drug trafficking activities, including the cultivation of opium poppy and U.S. distribution of heroin and, in an emerging trend, “rainbow” fentanyl (pills and powders whose bright colors, shapes, and sizes are marketed to young users).

In 2024, the DEA were reportedly seeking Rodolfo “Don Jose” Maldonado-Bustos and Euclides “El Quilles” Camacho-Goicochea.

The group was designated as a Foreign Terrorist Organization by the United States Department of State in February 2025.

== See also ==
- Mexican drug war
- List of Mexican cartels
