= Servando Gómez Martínez =

Mexican drug trafficker (born 1966)

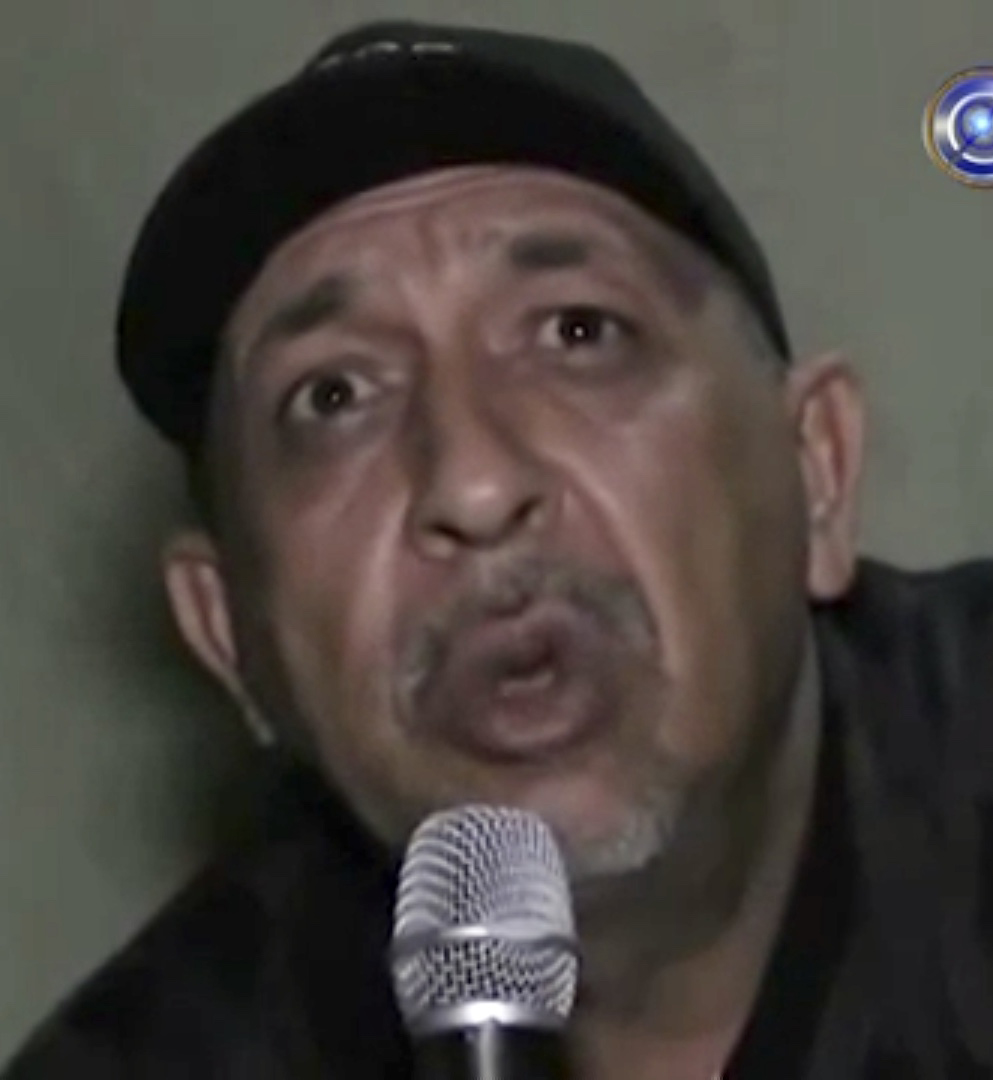
- Born: February 6, 1966 (age 60); Arteaga, Michoacán, Mexico
- Other names: La Tuta, El Profe
- Occupation: Leader of the Knights Templar
- Status: Extradited to the United States
- Reward amount: Mexico: $30 Million Mexican Pesos; USA: $5 million USD

Servando Gómez Martínez (born February 6, 1966), commonly referred to by his alias La Tuta (The Teacher) for once being a teacher, is a Mexican drug lord and former leader of the Knights Templar Cartel, a criminal organization based in the state of Michoacán. He is a former leader and founder member of La Familia Michoacana drug cartel, the split-off group of the Knights Templar. On February 27, 2015, he was arrested by Mexican security forces in Morelia, Michoacán. In 2019, he received a 55 year prison sentence for a kidnapping conviction. On August 12, 2025, he was extradited to the United States.

== Biography ==
Gómez Martínez served as the operational chief and spokesperson for the now extinct La Familia drug cartel, which sometimes was described as quasi-religious, since its former leader, Nazario Moreno Gonzalez, referred to their assassinations and beheadings as "divine justice." He cofounded the organization in 2006, and became its leader after Arnold Rueda Medina, aka la Minsa, was arrested. Servando Martínez' partners in La Familia Cartel were Nazario Moreno Gonzalez, José de Jesús Méndez Vargas, Enrique Plancarte Solís and Dionisio Loya Plancarte, who each have had a bounty of $2 million for their capture.

In 2009, he called a local TV newscast and called on the government of Felipe Calderón to negotiate with the country' s drug kingpins. Gómez Martínez has been indicted in the United States with conspiring to import and distribute hielo cocaine and methamphetamine into the United States from Mexico. According to the Gómez Martínez indictment, he was, among other things, responsible for ensuring that La Familia's drug trafficking activities were not impeded by law enforcement, and also for acquiring weapons for use by the cartel.

The Indictment alleges that, on July 17, 2009, a few days after the bodies of twelve murdered Mexican federal law enforcement officers were discovered following the arrest of a cartel leader, Alberto Espinoza Barron, Gómez Martínez made a recorded statement to a local television station in Michoacan, in which he publicly acknowledged that he was a member of La Familia Cartel, and among other things, stated that the cartel was in a battle against the Mexican federal police and prosecutors. He also offered the Mexican federal security forces a truce in exchange of freedom to continue their illegal drug trade. President Felipe Calderón's government refused to strike a deal with the cartel and ignored their calls for dialogue.

On 25 February 2010, the United States Department of the Treasury sanctioned Gómez Martínez under the Foreign Narcotics Kingpin Designation Act (sometimes referred to simply as the "Kingpin Act") for his involvement in drug trafficking along with twenty-one other international criminals and ten foreign entities. The act prohibited U.S. citizens and companies from doing any kind of business activity with him, and virtually froze all his assets in the U.S. During the first trimester of 2010, he was still registered as a teacher in the state of Michoacán, and earned a salary of 50,000 pesos during this period.

In a 2012 video, he explained the "peaceful credentials" of the Knights Templar Cartel and asked the leaders of Mexico's drug trafficking organizations to join forces and put down Miguel Treviño Morales (Z-40), one of the leaders of Los Zetas. He insisted that his organization is a "necessary evil," and insists that his organization is "not a cartel, nor any kind of organized criminal group. [They] are a brotherhood, founded by a set of statutes and codes." He then goes on to explain that the Knights Templar's "only function is to help the people, preserve [the] state ... and keep [Mexico] free of people causing terror ... [and] live in peace."Gómez Martínez then asks other cartels to create a "common front" against Los Zetas and asks Calderón to take on his action.

After La Familia leader Nazario Moreno González was falsely claimed to have been shot dead by security forces (he was actually not killed until 2014), Gómez Martínez took control of La Familia. Soon afterward Gómez Martínez broke with Méndez-Vargas and formed the Knights Templar Cartel. This splinter group soon developed a rivalry with La Familia. On June 21, 2011, Méndez Vargas was captured by Mexican security forces. On August 7, 2011, the Mexican Attorney General reported that the La Familia Cartel was disbanded.

In 2014 he gave an interview to Channel4 News in which he explained that he realized that he was a criminal, and that he knew that he would eventually pay for his crimes. But he maintained that he would not give himself up, but rather fight to the death. He also defended his decisions to do business with Chinese smugglers of iron ore who he claimed had a right to expand their markets.

== Arrest ==
On February 27, 2015, at 3 AM, Servando Gómez Martínez was captured. He was apprehended by an elite squadron of the Mexican Federal Police in Morelia, Michoacán, in an operation where no shots were fired. He was then transferred to the SEIDO installations, Mexico's organized crime investigation agency, in Mexico City for his legal presentation. That same night, he was transferred to the Federal Social Readaptation Center No. 1, a maximum-security prison in Almoloya de Juárez, State of Mexico.

The police were able to spot him in a cave near Morelia after his girlfriend ordered a chocolate cake for his 49th birthday, which raised the suspicion of the authorities looking for him. At the time of his arrest, Gómez Martínez was one of Mexico's most-wanted drug lords.

On 11 March, he was officially charged by a federal court in Toluca, State of Mexico for organized crime, kidnapping, and drug trafficking offenses.

During Joaquín "El Chapo" Guzmán's second escape in 2015, Servando Gómez Martínez, also jailed in the maximum-security prison of Almoloya, faked a heart attack to facilitate his escape.

=== Kidnapping conviction ===
In June 2019, he was sentenced to 55 years in jail for the kidnapping of a businessman in 2011.

=== Extradition ===
On August 12, 2025, Gómez Martínez was extradited to the United States.

== Family ==
His brother Luis Felipe Gómez Martinez, aka El Güicho, is in prison since 2001 for drug trafficking. Francisco Javier Sotelo Barrera, aka El Pancho, the presumed leader of La Familia, was identified in 2009 as the nephew of Servando Gómez Martinez.

His son Luis Alfredo Aguilera Esquivel was arrested by Mexican authorities on 3 March 2014 in Los Reyes, Michoacán. According to federal reports, he carried out kidnappings and extorted agricultural workers in Michoacán, the most recent one on orders from his father. His other son Huber Gómez Patiño was arrested by the Mexican Federal Police in Arteaga, Michoacán on 21 June 2014. His brother Aquiles Gómez Martínez was reportedly found dead in Lázaro Cárdenas, Michoacán with a gunshot wound on 19 September 2014. His cousin José Martínez Mendoza was arrested by the Federal Police in Uruapan, Michoacán on 8 November 2014. His alleged uncle Gerardo Martínez Legorreta was arrested by Michoacán security forces on 8 December 2014 in Arteaga.

== See also ==
- List of Mexico's 37 most-wanted drug lords
- Knights Templar Cartel
- La Familia Michoacana
