= Guanajuatillo =

Coordinates: 22°16′42.11″N 103°13′31.25″W

Guanajuatillo is a hamlet within the political jurisdiction of Huejúcar in Jalisco, Mexico. Current population is approximately 35. The elevation is approximately 5800 ft (1770 m).

The community's economy is based on agriculture.

Guanajuatillo is bordered to the east by the state of Zacatecas. Neighboring villages include Las Huertas, El Fraile, Las Liebres, El Alamo, and Tlalcosahua.

The municipality of Santa Maria de los Angeles, Jalisco is 13 kilometers to the south. The regional political center of the northern area of Jalisco, Colotlán, is 20 kilometers to the south.

== Notable people ==
- Nazario Moreno González (1970–2014)
