= Carlos Rosales Mendoza =

Mexican mob boss (1963–2015)

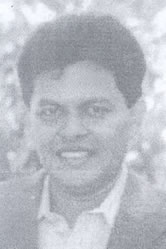
- Born: Carlos Alberto Rosales Mendoza; 12 February 1963; La Unión, Guerrero, Mexico
- Died: 27 December 2015 (aged 52); Gabriel Zamora, Michoacán
- Cause of death: Torture, gunshot
- Other names: El Tísico, El Prieto, El Carlitos
- Occupation: La Familia Cartel drug lord
- Criminal charges: Drug trafficking, organized crime and use of illegal firearms

Carlos Alberto Rosales Mendoza (12 February 1963 – 27 December 2015) was a Mexican drug lord who founded and led an organized crime syndicate called La Familia Michoacana. He was a close friend and associate of Osiel Cárdenas Guillén, the former leader of the Gulf Cartel.

He was born in the municipality of La Unión, Guerrero, in southern Mexico. When Rosales Mendoza founded the first cells of La Familia Michoacana in the 1980s, the Milenio Cartel was competing with the organization for the control of the production and distribution of narcotics in the state of Michoacán. In 2000, Rosales Mendoza united with the Gulf Cartel and Los Zetas to thwart the Milenio Cartel, causing a wave of violence in western Mexico that lasted until the year 2003. He was arrested twice, on 24 October 2004, and on 5 August 2014, and set free in late 2014. He was found dead in a parking lot on 28 December 2015.

== Criminal career ==
Reports suggest that Rosales Mendoza's organization can be traced back to the 1980s and that was possibly a vigilante group to counter corruption and local crime, but the organization eventually became involved in the production and distribution of narcotics throughout the state of Michoacán. In the year 2000, Rosales Mendoza broke relations with Armando Valencia Cornelio of the Milenio Cartel and founded his own organization in Michoacan called La Empresa ('The Business'), a criminal organization that was the direct predecessor of La Familia Michoacana, some sources state that La Empresa and La Familia Michoacana are essentially the same thing, mainly because they share the same members but not the same allies. He also formed an alliance with Osiel Cárdenas Guillén, then leader of the Gulf Cartel and Los Zetas, and merged with his organization. This alliance was intended to displace the Milenio Cartel from Michoacán, and provoked a series of assassinations in the area until 2003. With the alliance, Rosales Mendoza became a Gulf Cartel operator and Cárdenas Guillén dispatched two lieutenants of Los Zetas, Efraín Teodoro Torres (Z-14) and Gustavo González Castro (The Erotic One), to help him to train his men and protect the drug trafficking corridors in Guerrero and in the port city of Lázaro Cárdenas. He soon gained the trust of Cárdenas Guillén and became one of the leading lieutenants for the Gulf Cartel in western Mexico, where he commanded a training camp and taught over 50 gunmen military tactics in order to carry out a prisons break to free Cárdenas Guillén, who had been captured and imprisoned in 2003.

In 2004, he organised the armed assault on a maximum security prison. His men managed to free 25 inmates, but Rosales Mendoza was arrested on suspicion of masterminding the jailbreak and spent the next decade in prison. After Rosales's arrest in 2004, Nazario Moreno González seized control of the gang and in 2006 severed ties with the Gulf Cartel and Los Zetas in an effort to take control of Michoacán from any external influences, marking the birth of an independent La Familia Cartel and starting a turf war against their former allies.

== Arrests ==
While preparing to liberate Osiel Cárdenas Guillén from prison, a squadron of about 150 soldiers in the Grupo Aeromóvil de Fuerzas Especiales (GAFE), the special forces unit of the Mexican Army, arrested Rosales Mendoza in the capital city of Morelia, Michoacán, on 24 October 2004. Upon his arrest, Rosales Mendoza was taken into custody to Mexico City and kept in La Palma prison until he was taken to Puente Grande, a maximum security prison in the western state of Jalisco, on 28 October 2004 for 10 years. His capture resulted in new organizational leaders: José de Jesús Méndez Vargas and Nazario Moreno González.

On 22 May 2014, Rosales Mendoza was released from prison in Jalisco after fulfilling his ten-year sentence for illegal possession of firearms, organized crime, and drug trafficking. On 5 August 2014, he was arrested again by state authorities at a restaurant in Morelia, Michoacán, but was released shortly after without charges.

== Kingpin Act sanction ==
On 24 March 2010, the United States Department of the Treasury sanctioned Rosales Mendoza under the Foreign Narcotics Kingpin Designation Act (sometimes referred to simply as the "Kingpin Act"), for his involvement in drug trafficking along with fifty-three other international criminals and ten foreign entities. The act prohibited U.S. citizens and companies from doing any kind of business activity with him, and virtually froze all his assets in the U.S. Carlos Rosales Mendoza was listed on the DEA's "most wanted" list.

== Death ==
Rosales Mendoza was found dead on 28 December 2015 in a car park in Gabriel Zamora, Michoacán, along with three other bodies. All four bodies showed signs of having been tortured. Authorities suspect Ignacio Andrade Rentería (El Cenizo), a former mob lieutenant who now runs the Knights Templar Cartel.

== See also ==
- Mérida Initiative
- Mexican drug war
- War on drugs

== Bibliography ==
- Grayson, George W. (2012). The Executioner's Men: Los Zetas, Rogue Soldiers, Criminal Entrepreneurs, and the Shadow State They Created (1st ed.). Transaction Publishers. ISBN 9781412846172.
