= Arnoldo Torres =

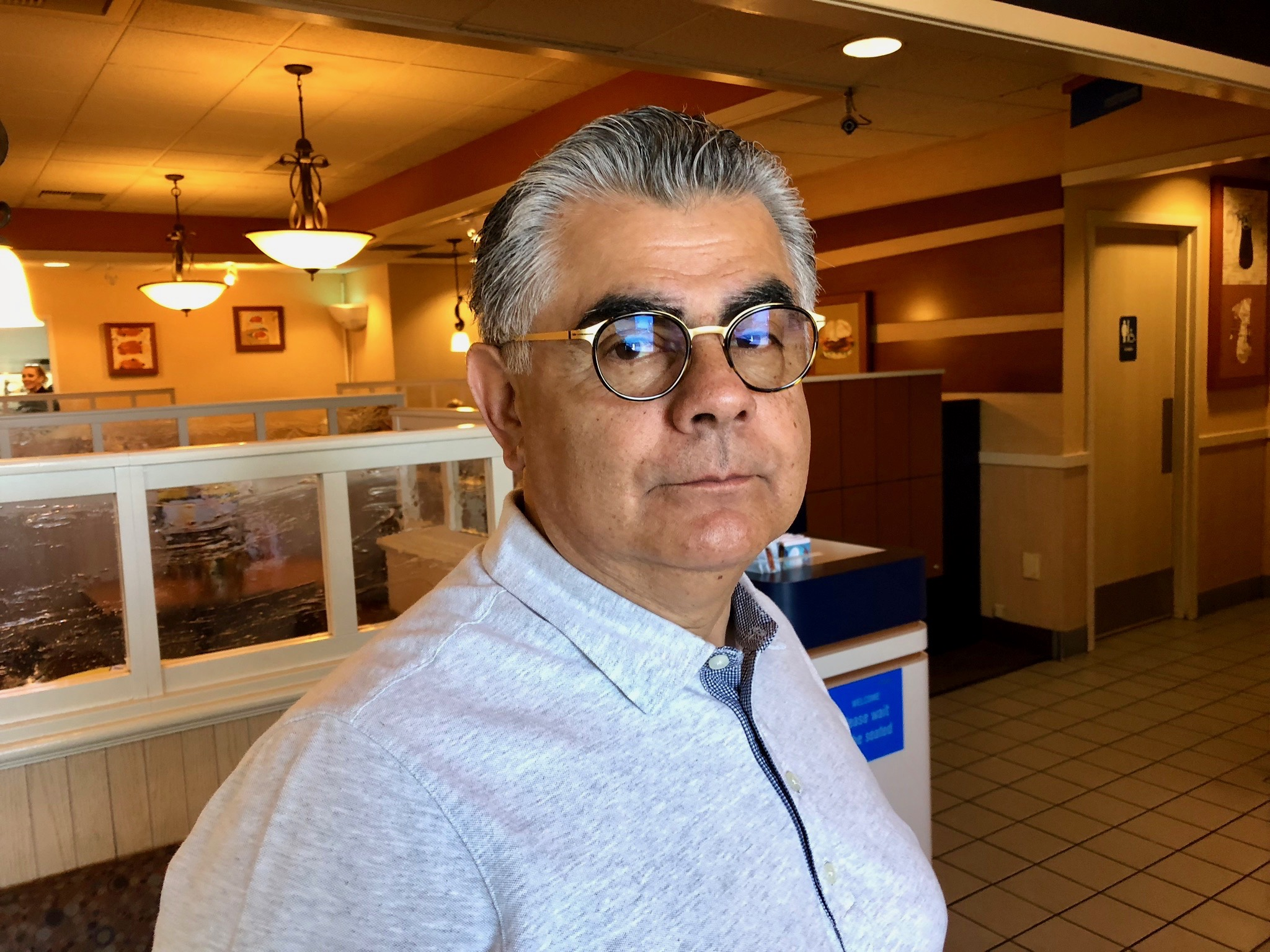
Arnoldo Torres near his home in Sacramento

Arnoldo Torres is a journalist, consultant, partner in the Sacramento, California based public policy consulting firm Torres & Torres, and the executive director for the California Hispanic Health Care Association. Torres played a significant role the debate surrounding the Immigration Reform and Control Act (IRCA) of 1986, which addressed civil rights protections, temporary workers and legalization. He has since assumed a nuanced position Torres Immigration Plan which supports repatriation of a majority of the undocumented workers. He couples this with a position calling for having the United States finance Mexican infrastructure projects which would create jobs in their communities in Mexico.

Articles written by Torres have appeared in the Chicago Tribune, Arizona Republic, Sacramento Bee, Albuquerque Journal and U.S. News & World Report. He has been a guest on Firing Line, Crossfire, CBS Morning News, Phil Donohue, CNN, and Spanish-language networks Univision, Telemundo and TV Azteca.

From 1979 to 1985, Torres served as the executive director of the League of United Latin American Citizens.

Torres is also involved with Latino outreach and media activities. As a consultant for Torres & Torres, Torres assists nonprofit organizations and advocates on behalf of indigent and ethnic minority communities. Torres has developed policy initiatives that seek to bring doctors from Mexico to serve rural, Spanish-speaking communities, and to expand the cultural competency of health-care professionals in California.
