= Arnoldo Granella =

Italian-French footballer (1939–2022)

Personal information
- Date of birth: 1 April 1939
- Place of birth: Briga Marittima, Italy (today La Brigue, France)
- Date of death: 23 February 2022 (aged 82)
- Height: 1.70 m (5 ft 7 in)
- Position: Forward

Senior career*
Years	Team	Apps	(Gls)
1961–1962	Le Havre	17	(5)
1962	→ Genoa	0	(0)
1962–1963	Bordeaux	3	(0)
1963–1969	Nice	53	(9)
Total		73	(14)
- * Club domestic league appearances and goals

Arnoldo Granella (1 April 1939 – 23 February 2022) was a French footballer who played as a forward.

== Biography ==
Granella played his career in France for Le Havre AC, Girondins de Bordeaux, and OGC Nice. He played 26 matches in Division 1 and 14 matches in Division 2. On 19 November 1961, he scored twice in one match for Le Havre against Toulouse FC. On 11 October 1964, he scored twice in a Division two match against US Forbach. Granella died on 23 February 2022, at the age of 82.

== Honours ==
Genoa

- Cup of the Alps: 1962

Nice

- French Division 2: 1964–65
