= Cartel: The Coming Invasion of Mexico's Drug Wars =

2011 non-fiction book by Sylvia Longmire

- Front cover of the book.
- Author: Sylvia Longmire
- Language: English
- Subject: Mexican drug war War on drugs
- Genre: Non-fiction
- Publisher: Palgrave Macmillan
- Publication date: 27 September 2011
- Pages: 256
- ISBN: 0230111378

Cartel: The Coming Invasion of Mexico's Drug Wars is a non-fiction book about the Mexican drug war written by Sylvia Longmire, an independent consultant, freelance writer, and former Air Force captain. In her book, Longmire gives an overview of Mexico's drug war and describes the impact it has on the United States' national security. Drawing from her experience as an intelligence analyst of drug trafficking and border security, the author details the holes of the current drug policy of both the United States and Mexico.

The book also covers the "spillover effect" of Mexico's drug violence in the United States, and how the narcotics distribution has grown on U.S. soil. Longmire's major contributions were describing the "tactics, techniques and procedures" of the Mexican drug trafficking organizations, particularly in kidnappings, where the author dedicates a whole chapter on how the cartels materialize them. She also contrasts the modus operandi of the Colombian drug gangs with Mexico's crime groups, and argues that the cartels in Mexico are more violent and erratic. In addition, she argues for the exploration of "regulatory options for the production, sale and distribution of marijuana in the United States," and provides demand-side strategies to control marijuana use.

In an interview, the author clarified that the term "invasion" does not relate to a war incursion of the Mexican drug cartels in America, but rather to their "corrupting influence on U.S. law enforcement, and a slow increase of spillover violence." The book, however, stresses that Mexico is not a failed state and that an effective cooperation with the United States is possible, just as long as they make it a top priority issue.

== Critical reception ==
According to InSight Crime, the book is "an excellent introduction for someone new to the subject of Mexican drug trafficking." In addition, the agency stated that Longmire's book is a "thoughtful text, which warns not of a literal invasion of cartel gunmen, but of the insidious spread of corruption over the border." The Kirkus Reviews stated that Longmire "...makes a convincing case that within the United States, the violence stemming from illegal substances has caused more injuries and deaths than generally acknowledged by law-enforcement agencies." Nicholas Stein, producer of the series Border Wars, recommended the Cartel, saying it is an "easy-to-read, one-stop shopping overview of the myriad issues facing us from Mexico's cartels." David A. Marvelli, a Ph.D. candidate of Rutgers University and an intelligence analyst for the FBI, stated that the book "presents an insightful introduction to a very complex topic of consequence for U.S. national security: the Mexican drug trade and its incipient violence and destabilization of Mexican governance."

The Small Wars Journal stated that Longmire is "...one of the few authors, who successfully brings to light the spill over effect of criminal activities that are historically associated with border towns, and are now present in cities like Atlanta; one of many which is evolving into distribution hubs of illegal narcotics." Borderland Beat noted that Longmire's books focuses primarily on the "...national security optics, [and that the Mexican cartels are] closer to terrorists, of whom she cites al-Qaeda and Colombia's FARC in the same breath." Nonetheless, the review said that he cannot buy the terrorist appellation because the cartels do not have an ideology behind what they do, since their goal is making money.
