= Arnoldo's Ristorantino =

Argentine children's television series

- Spanish: El Ristorantino de Arnoldo
- Genre: Children's; Musical; Comedy
- Directed by: Karina Insausti
- Starring: Diego Topa; Julio Graham; Belén Pasqualini; Mica Romano; Ignacio Riva Palacio; Julian Pozzi; Ana María Cores
- Opening theme: El Ristorantino by Cast of El Ristorantino de Arnoldo
- Ending theme: El Ristorantino (Instrumental)
- Composers: Mauro Cambarieri; Federico Montero; Emilio Oliveiro; Anahí Cascabelo; Fernando Vila; Mauro Franceschini Campo; Nicolás del Castillo; Andrés Lucio Caceres; Mauro E. Conde; Ernesto Algranati
- Country of origin: Argentina
- Original language: Spanish
- No. of seasons: 1
- No. of episodes: 18

Production
- Executive producers: Fernando Barbosa; Leonardo Aranguiel; Cecilia Mendonça; Javier Castany; Patricio Rabufetti; Gastón Gualco; Sergio Núgoli
- Production locations: Buenos Aires, Federal District, Argentina
- Cinematography: Alejandra Martín
- Editors: Laureano Rizzo; Pablo Bologna
- Running time: 24 minutes
- Production company: Non Stop Producciones

Original release
- Network: Disney+
- Release: January 29 – May 21, 2021

Related
- Junior Express

Arnoldo's Ristorantino (Spanish: El Ristorantino de Arnoldo) is an Argentine children's television series, produced by Non Stop Producciones for Disney Junior and the streaming service Disney+, aired January 21 and May 21, 2021. It is a spin-off of the series Junior Express.

== Plot ==
In Bahía Bonita, a small fictional town by the sea, Arnoldo opens his Ristorantino with Francis who is now Head of Waiters. Arnoldo will revive the place by creating unique food experiences with his dishes. But he's going to have some competition: the villain siblings, Malú and Keno Malvatti, who produce and sell processed food from a food truck that they park right in front of the Ristorantino. In each episode, Arnoldo and his team try to delight Ristorantino's clients despite the Malvattis' plans to sabotage them. Here, music, friendship, and fun will always be the main ingredients!

== Voice cast ==
- Diego Topa as Arnoldo
- Julio Graham as Francis
- Mica Romano as Alina
- Ignacio Riva Palacios as Keno
- Julia Tozzi as Fiore
- Belén Pasqualini as Malú
- Ana María Cores as Margarita

== List of episodes ==
1. La inaguración: The Ristorantino is inaugurated, and the place receives its first customers.
2. La Malúracha: Malú creates a robot cockroach to scare away Arnoldo's clients.
3. La feria del limón: An annual fair is held in Bahía Bonita, where there are games for the town and Francis represents the ristorantino in the tournament.
4. Palillos: A client comes from China, but Arnoldo behaves like a stubborn, because the cook does not respect the customs of the Asian.
5. Yo no fui: Fiore makes a big mess when she takes control of the ristorantino while Arnoldo is away.
6. La cuchara de arnoldo: Fiore loses Arnoldo's grandmother's spoon and the ristorantino workers try to find it without the chef noticing.
7. Concurso de video: The Ristorantino participates in a contest for the best video of Bahia Bonita.
8. Una visita especial: Capitulo emotivo en donde el Capitan Topa se reencuentra con sus viejos amigos Francis y Arnoldo en Bahia Bonita-
9. Pirata Bostezo: Arnoldo is scared after hearing the legend of the Pirate Yawn, in which he said that a pirate was taking over Bahia Bonita.
10. Fruta del corazón: María offends Margarita and there is an argument between them, while Francis, Alina and Fiore try to befriend them.
11. Picnic de Margarita: The door of the ristorantino is blocked, so the place welcomes its customers on the street.
12. La Malúrobot: Malú creates a robot that changes the temperature of the environment and with that makes the Ristorantino more hot.
13. Malvatti vs Malvatti: The brothers Keno and Malú face off to see who is the first to get a highly coveted flower from Arnoldo.
14. Nuevo camarero: Keno, disguised as a waiter, sets France up to make him look bad at the sailor's festival.
15. Galletas de Margarita: The episode was dark during the early morning of a stormy night in Bahía Bonita, in which Margarita eats the cookies that she was going to give Arnoldo, but she was overcome by her temptation and ate all of them. The team tries to discover who the alleged thief is.
16. El arqueólogo: A curious archaeologist goes to the Ristorantino after a long journey of expedition.
17. Menú de Arnoldo: Arnoldo opens his menu at the Ristorantino and receives a peculiar visit.
18. La Princesa: Malú, dressed as a princess, visits the restaurant to make tricky plans: she insults and offends Francis, Alina and Fiore, but the chef Arnoldo does not pay attention to his team's comments, so the waiter, the receptionist and the chef's niece decide give up. It is there that Arnoldo learns a great lesson.

== Soundtrack ==
El Ristorantino de Arnoldo (Banda Sonora Original)

Soundtrack album by Various artists
- Released: January 29, 2021
- Genre: Children's
- Length: 26:19
- Language: Spanish
- Label: Walt Disney Records

El Ristorantino de Arnoldo (Banda Sonora Original) is the soundtrack for the series of the same name, it was originally released in Argentina on January 29, 2021 by Walt Disney Records in Spanish, in the format of streaming digital.

Track listing

No.	Title	Performer(s)	Length
1.	"El Ristorantino"	Elenco de El Ristorantino de Arnoldo	2:12
2.	"Que bonita es la vida"	Elenco de El Ristorantino de Arnoldo	2:05
3.	"Rapibocados"	Elenco de El Ristorantino de Arnoldo	1:41
4.	"Vengan a comer"	Elenco de El Ristorantino de Arnoldo	2:45
5.	"A limpiar y ordenar"	Elenco de El Ristorantino de Arnoldo	2:06
6.	"El team del sabor"	Elenco de El Ristorantino de Arnoldo	2:47
7.	"Bienviendos al Ristorantino"	Elenco de El Ristorantino de Arnoldo	2:05
8.	"Boogie de la cocina"	Elenco de El Ristorantino de Arnoldo	2:00
9.	"Bu, buuu"	Elenco de El Ristorantino de Arnoldo	2:05
10.	"Peki, bum, bum"	Elenco de El Ristorantino de Arnoldo	2:18
11.	"A cocinar"	Elenco de El Ristorantino de Arnoldo	2:08
12.	"Un dúo genial"	Elenco de El Ristorantino de Arnoldo	2:08
Total length:			26:19
