= Nazario Moreno González =

Mexican drug trafficker

- Born: 8 March 1970; Apatzingán, Michoacán, Mexico
- Died: 9 March 2014 (aged 44); Tumbiscatío, Michoacán, Mexico
- Cause of death: Two gunshot wounds in his thorax
- Other names: El Chayo; El Más Loco ('The Craziest One'); Víctor Nazario Castrejón Peña; Emiliano Morelos Guervara; Ernesto Morelos Villa
- Occupation: Drug trafficker
- Known for: Leader of La Familia Michoacana and the Knights Templar Cartel
- Predecessor: Carlos Rosales Mendoza
- Successor: José de Jesús Méndez Vargas; Dionicio Loya Plancarte; Servando Gómez Martínez; Enrique Plancarte Solís

Notes
- $2.2 million dollar reward was offered.

Nazario Moreno González (8 March 1970 – 9 March 2014), commonly referred to by his aliases El Chayo ('Nazario' or 'The Rosary') and El Más Loco ('The Craziest One'), was a Mexican drug lord who headed La Familia Michoacana before heading the Knights Templar Cartel, a drug cartel headquartered in the state of Michoacán. He was one of Mexico's most-wanted drug lords.

Very few details are known of Moreno González's early life, but the authorities believe that religion played a major role in his upbringing. Although born in Michoacán, Moreno González moved to the United States as a teenager, but fled back into Mexico about a decade later to avoid prosecution on drug trafficking charges. In 2004, the drug boss Carlos Rosales Mendoza was captured, and Moreno González, alongside José de Jesús Méndez Vargas, took control of La Familia Michoacana. Unlike other traditional drug trafficking organizations in Mexico, his organization also operated like a religious cult, where its own members were given "bibles" with sayings and conduct guidelines. Moreno González reportedly carried out several philanthropic deeds to help the marginalized in Michoacán. Such deeds helped him craft an image of protector, saint, and Christ-like messianic figure among the poor, and gave La Familia Michoacana a level of influence among some natives.

The Mexican government reported that Moreno González was killed during a two-day gunfight with the Mexican federal police in his home state in December 2010. After the shootout, however, no body was recovered. Rumours thus persisted that Moreno González was still alive and leading the Knights Templar Cartel, the split-off group of La Familia Michoacana. Four years later, on 9 March 2014, his survival was confirmed. Mexican authorities located him again, this time in the town of Tumbiscatío, Michoacán, and attempted to apprehend him. A gunfight ensued resulting in Moreno González's death. Subsequent forensic examination confirmed his identity.

== Criminal career ==
=== Early life ===
Moreno González was born in the ranchería of Guanajuatillo in Apatzingán, Michoacán, Mexico at around 5:00 a.m. on 8 March 1970. There are few details of Moreno González's upbringing, but religion may have played an important role in his early life. His parents had 13 children (including Moreno González). His father Manuel Moreno was reportedly an alcoholic and had several mistresses, and one day he left his family when Moreno González was still very young, forcing his mother to singlehandedly raise the whole family. With their father gone, Moreno González and his siblings lived under the strict discipline of their mother. According to his autobiography, Moreno González had a love-hate relationship with his mother; as a child, he was beaten by his mother for being troublesome and getting into fights. In one occasion, he recalled that his mother once forced him to make his way back to his house by walking on his knees while keeping his arms stretched like a cross throughout the whole day for stealing an animal. Such treatments helped him develop resentment as to partially explain his violent behavior as an adult, he argued. He admitted, however, that he often got into fist fights with other kids from Guanajuatillo and the surrounding rancherías. Moreno González recalled that he would not always win and that he once got into 10 fights in a single day. His violent reputation as a child helped him earn the nickname El Más Loco ("The Craziest One")—which he held onto for the rest of his life—among his siblings and other kids from the area where he grew up.

He never attended school and was illiterate for some years of his early life. He learned to read and write reportedly out of curiosity after seeing and hearing comic books and stories of Kalimán and Porfirio Cadena, El Ojo de Vidrio on the local radio station. In his autobiography, Moreno González said that as a child he believed he had the superhuman ability of speaking telepathically with animals like Kalimán did in the comics. He said he wanted to be a hero like the comic characters. As a child, he was accustomed to seeing gunmen near his home, and played las guerritas ("war games") for fun. While playing the game, he often pretended to be dead, only to say later on that he had been wounded in the game but that he had managed to survive. Aged twelve he moved to Apatzingán and made a living by selling matches, peeling onions, working at a melon field, and throwing out the trash from several booths at a marketplace. As a teenager in the late 1980s, Moreno González migrated illegally to the United States, settling in California, where he eventually began selling marijuana. After some years, he moved to Texas and in 1994 was arrested for drug trafficking charges in McAllen. Nearly a decade later in 2003, the US government charged him with conspiracy to distribute five tons of narcotics and issued an arrest warrant. González fled back to Mexico.

=== Organized crime ===
Although raised Catholic, Moreno González became a Jehovah's Witness during his time in the United States. In Apatzingán, Moreno González preached to the poor and always carried a Bible with him. With time, he won the loyalty of several locals, and many started to see him as a "messiah" for preaching religious principles and forming La Familia Michoacana, a drug cartel that posed as a vigilante group. When Carlos Rosales Mendoza was arrested in 2004, Moreno González ascended to the apex of La Familia Michoacana, a drug trafficking organization based in western Mexico, along with José de Jesús Méndez Vargas. In 2006, La Familia Michoacana broke relations with the Gulf Cartel and Los Zetas, and Moreno González heralded the organization's independence when several of his gunmen tossed five human heads on a discothèque dance floor in Uruapan. Near the severed heads lay a message that read, "La Familia doesn't kill for money, doesn't kill women, doesn't kill innocents. Only those who deserve to die will die."

In 2009, the Mexican government published a list of its 37 most-wanted drug lords and offered a $2.2 million reward for information that led to Moreno González's capture. His three partners – José de Jesús Méndez Vargas, Servando Gómez Martínez and Dionisio Loya Plancarte – were also on the list. In 2010, he was sanctioned under the Foreign Narcotics Kingpin Designation Act (sometimes referred to simply as the "Kingpin Act") by the United States Department of the Treasury for his involvement in drug trafficking. The act prohibited US citizens and companies from doing business with Moreno González, and froze virtually all his assets in the US.

Los Zetas broke off from the Gulf Cartel in 2010, after serving in the armed wing of the organization for more than a decade. But, in opposition to Los Zetas, González's cartel re-joined the Gulf Cartel and allied with the Sinaloa Cartel to fight them off. After that La Familia Michoacana became one of the fastest-growing cartels in Mexico's drug war. It stood out for its promotion of "family values" and religious agenda, unlike traditional cartels. Although deeply involved in the methamphetamine business, Moreno González's cartel diversified its criminal agenda by controlling numerous "counterfeiting, extortion, kidnapping, armed robbery, prostitution and car dealership" rings in Michoacán and nearby states. By mid-2009, La Familia had managed to establish a foothold in about 20 to 30 urban areas across the United States.

Moreno González required his men to carry a "spiritual manual" that he wrote himself, "[containing] pseudo-Christian aphorisms for self-improvement." In his "bible," Moreno González prohibited his men from consuming alcoholic beverages or other drugs, and stated that he would severely punish those who mistreated women. His writings encouraged the corporal punishment of thieves by beating them and making them walk naked with billboards in the city streets. He prohibited members of his cartel from consuming or selling methamphetamine in Michoacán, arguing that the drug was only to be smuggled into the US for American consumers. Moreno González justified drug trafficking by stating that La Familia Michoacana regulated the drug trade to prevent exploitation of the people. The book, sometimes known as "The Sayings of the Craziest One", also talks about humility, service, wisdom, brotherhood, courage, and God. His second book, titled "They Call Me The Craziest One", is 13 chapters long and talks about his life, idealism, the origins of La Familia Michoacana, their battle against Los Zetas, and his rationale for joining organized crime. The text reads like a diary and justifies his criminal activities under the rationale that just like others in Michoacán, the limited opportunities and his poor financial situation pushed him to get involved in the drug trade. In addition, González blamed the government for the existence of criminals.

As leader of La Familia Michoacana, González was in charge of forging alliances with other cartels. Reportedly, González met with several other high-ranking drug traffickers, including Fernando Sánchez Arellano of the Tijuana Cartel; Juan José Esparragoza Moreno of the Sinaloa Cartel; and Antonio Cárdenas Guillén of the Gulf Cartel. In these agreements, the cartels allowed La Familia Michoacana to move drugs freely in their territories in exchange for their support in fighting off rival gangs like Los Zetas. In 2008, Moreno González agreed to send armed men to help Joaquín Guzmán Loera and Ismael Zambada García fight off rival cartels, a favor which granted him access to the drug corridors in Sinaloa and Sonora. In addition, his friendship with the Gulf Cartel leader Jorge Eduardo Costilla Sánchez allowed him access to the northeastern state of Tamaulipas.

=== Philanthropy ===
During his tenure as leader of La Familia Michoacana, Moreno González reportedly gave loans to farmers, funded schools and churches, financed drainage projects, and carried out several aid campaigns to help out the disadvantaged in the state of Michoacán. This, along with the manpower of the organization, allowed him to get the support of several rural sectors in the state, where many served as informants and collaborators for the cartel. His wife was also known for organizing several self-help seminars in Apatzingán. The support of La Familia Michoacana is rooted in family connections and local communities in Michoacán, and in the supposed exploitation of its citizens by the government.

== Alleged 2010 death ==
On 9 December 2010, the Mexican federal police surrounded the city of El Alcalde in Apatzingán, Michoacán with more than 2,000 officers. Reportedly, Moreno González was at a local festival handing out Christmas presents to the villagers when he was tracked down by the authorities.

As the police troops drove into town, gunmen of La Familia Michoacana blocked the entrances with more than 40 burning trucks and cars. La Familia gunmen also surrounded the state capital of Morelia in an attempt to prevent the police from receiving reinforcements. The shootout lasted about two days, and at least 11 deaths were confirmed. (Note: Since the gunmen carried away the bodies of their partners during the firefight, it is impossible to know the exact number of people who were killed. The police commander, Elías Álvarez, who led the 2010 operation in Apatzingán, estimated that more than 50 people were killed.) During the gun battle, the gunmen managed to carry out the bodies of their fallen comrades up the hills. The government reported at the time that Moreno González had been killed, but that the cartel took his body away. This triggered rumors that he was alive and leading his cartel. However, the Mexican government denied such claims. Elías Álvarez, the commander of the 2010 police operation, said González's grave was in the mountains. 2014 reports from the Mexican government stated that Moreno González was possibly injured (but not killed) during the shootout. For four years, the drug lord took advantage of the government's mistake to fall off the authorities's radar and continue to command the cartel behind the scenes.

=== Background and aftermath ===
The alleged death of Moreno González was considered one of the most significant government victories since the start of the drug war in 2006. La Familia Michoacana was the focus of the government because their stronghold, Michoacán state, is approximately four hours away from the country's capital, Mexico City. In addition, Michoacán is the home state of former President Felipe Calderón, who made it a top priority to pacify it.

A few days after the shootout, several people carried out a peace march in Apatzingán expressing their support for the cartel with banners that read "Nazario will always live in our hearts," among others. Others protested against the presence of the federal forces in the state, and argued that the federal government—not the cartels—were responsible for increasing the violence in the country. Through several banners hung on bridges throughout the state of Michoacán, La Familia Michoacana publicly announced that they were open to the possibility of creating a "truce" (ceasefire) with the Mexican government throughout December 2010 and January 2011 to prove that they were not the source of the violence. The Mexican authorities "summarily rejected" the agreement.

After Moreno Gonzalez was reported dead, José de Jesús Méndez Vargas took the lead of La Familia Michoacana. The other cartel leader, Servando Gómez Martínez (alias "La Tuta"), fought Méndez Vargas for control of the group and eventually formed the Knights Templar Cartel, a drug cartel and pseudo-religious splinter group. The cartel was headed by Moreno González, followed by Gómez Martínez, Dionisio Loya Plancarte (alias "El Tío"), and Enrique Plancarte Solís (alias "Kike Plancarte"), in that order. However, given that the Mexican government believed that Moreno González had been killed in 2010, Gómez Martínez was regarded as the first-in-command. Since its creation, the Knights Templar Cartel became a greater security concern for the Mexican government; it began to extort lime farmers, cutters, and packers, as well as people who worked in the avocado business in Michoacán. The cartel also stole minerals from the state's reserves to later ship to China for sale on the black market. Killings, extortions, kidnappings, and arson attacks against Michoacán residents and local businesses increased. In response to the cartel's activities, autodefensa (vigilante/self-defense) groups began to emerge in Michoacán in 2011, and gained significant momentum in February 2013 when they began to push the cartel outside of the Tierra Caliente region. President Enrique Peña Nieto sent in more federal troops to Michoacán in January 2014 initially with the intent to disarm the informal groups. However, that plan was quickly abandoned following some resistance, and the government decided to sign an agreement that month with the autodefensas to combat insecurity together.

=== Allegations of having survived the attempted police capture ===
Given that Moreno González's body was never recovered from the December 2010 shootout where officials said he was killed, there were rumors that he was alive and secretly leading the Knights Templar Cartel, the split-off group of La Familia Michoacana. In June 2011, members of La Familia Michoacana set up several public banners throughout the state of Guerrero with written messages directed to the former President Calderón and his security spokesman Alejandro Poiré. The banners proclaimed that Moreno González was in fact alive and leading the Knights Templar Cartel, and that the government was allegedly covering him up. The rumors were immediately denied by the Mexican government, which stood firm that the drug lord was killed by federal forces on 9 December 2010. Rumors sparked again in October 2011 following the arrest of Mario Buenrostro Quiroz, a drug trafficker who headed a Mexico City-based gang known as Los Aboytes. In a videotaped police confession, he told authorities that Moreno González was still alive and heading the cartel. Investigative news site InSight Crime said the rumors were probably part of a campaign of the Knights Templar Cartel to win prestige from La Familia Michoacana by saying that their leader is in fact alive and still supporting the group. On 27 October 2012, the Mexican Army raided a safe house in Apatzingán where they believed the drug lord Enrique Plancarte Solís was hiding. Though the raid was ultimately unsuccessful because Plancarte Solís managed to avoid capture by sending several gunmen from his inner circle to battle off the soldiers, the authorities discovered several documents written for Moreno González. The Army gave the documents to the intelligence agency SIEDO for further investigation.

Many Michoacán natives believed that Moreno González was alive; he was widely believed to have made a public appearance in Morelia in 2012 after his son was killed in a motorcycle accident. According to an unnamed official, his sister went to the morgue to reclaim the body of his son before the autopsy. When the coroner refused to give her the body, Moreno González paid him a visit and convinced him to give up the body. In fears of reprisals, local media outlets self-censored and did not report on the death of his son. Those who wrecked his son were reportedly kidnapped by Moreno González men and killed. In addition, one militia leader from the town of Coalcomán reported seeing him dressed as Saint Francis of Assisi, baptizing people, and leading his henchmen. There was no concrete evidence of Moreno González being alive. However, since no autopsy was performed, there was no evidence of him being dead either. In January 2014, Gregorio López, a priest of Apatzingán, reported that Moreno González ordered a self-imposed curfew in the city and threatened to burn down businesses that did not comply with the order. That week Michoacán had a series of violent episodes after the state's autodefensa (vigilante) groups—which emerged in February 2013 to fight the Knights Templar Cartel—attempted to move into several municipalities to fight the cartel. The priest said in an interview that there were rumors that the drug lord met with "La Tuta" for lunch in La Cucha, a ranch outside of Apatzingán. In an interview with Noticias MVS in February 2014, the former self-defense group leader José Manuel Mireles Valverde stated that Moreno González celebrated Christmas Day (25 December 2013) with the cartel leader Enrique Plancarte Solís and his daughter and banda singer Melissa at the drug lord's house. Mireles claimed in March 2014 that the self-defense groups nearly captured Moreno González at a ranch close to Tumbiscatío, Michoacán, but that he managed to escape 20 minutes before their arrival.

Rumors surrounding these allegations were around since Moreno González was declared dead by the Mexican government in 2010. The mysticism and spiritual teachings of the drug lord have played an important role in the Knights Templar Cartel's propaganda and recruitment in Michoacán. By spreading such rumors, the cartel hoped to gain a level of consensus from the public in their fight against the self-defense militias and state forces in the state.

== Veneration ==
Nazario Moreno González

Saint Nazario, Representative of God, Knight of the Town, Protector of the Poorest
- Born: 8 March 1970; Apatzingán, Mexico
- Died: 9 March 2014 (aged 44); Tumbiscatío, Mexico
- Venerated in: La Familia Michoacana; Knights Templar Cartel; Mexico; Folk Catholicism
- Major shrine: Holanda and Apatzingán, Mexico
- Attributes: Knight's Templar surcoat, golden sword
- Patronage: People of Michoacán, protection from harm, protection from Los Zetas

After Moreno González's reported death in 2010, Michoacán natives reportedly began to worship him as a saint, "drawing attention to the links between narco-culture and religion." In the region of Apatzingán, people created altars with statues and photos in honor of him. The figurines are often dressed in tunics similar to the Knights Templar, and had prayers calling him Saint Nazario. Reforma newspaper reported that Moreno González had his own prayer: "Oh Lord Almighty, free me from all sins, give me protection through Saint Nazario." These altars are found in the village of Holanda, on the hill of El Cerrito de la Cruz, and in Apatzingán. Villagers have noted that they had been forced to venerate the criminal under threat of armed force by the gang members.

Throughout his criminal career, Moreno González promoted La Familia Michoacana as an organization that existed to protect the people in Michoacán, where he carried out several campaigns that implemented curfews, punished drinkers, and attacked Los Zetas, who he claimed had corroded the morality of the state and community. The prayers that are now dedicated to Moreno González now refer to him as the "Representative of God," the "Protector of the poorest," and as the "Knight of the towns." Such behavior proves that La Familia Michoacana's religious campaign influenced the local area.

The area where the altars are located is reportedly patrolled by Los 12 apóstoles ('12 apostles'), the security body that allegedly protected Moreno González.

== Death ==
At around 7:00 a.m. on 9 March 2014, the Mexican Army and Navy pinpointed Moreno González's whereabouts in Tumbiscatío, Michoacán. When they tried to apprehend him, the drug lord opened fire at the security forces before being killed in the fire exchange. Mexico's Procuraduría General de la República (PGR) officially confirmed his identity through DNA examinations and fingerprint identification. The results were consistent with law enforcement files. While investigators conducted the autopsy at a hospital in Apatzingán, more than 150 law enforcement officers from the Army, Navy, Federal Police, and the PGR cordoned the area to prevent organized crime members from attempting to steal his body. Post-mortem reports indicated that Moreno González died of two gunshot wounds on his thorax. On 12 March 2014, his corpse was transferred to Morelia under tight security for further testing. At the time of his death, the drug lord was wanted by the Mexican government for charges relating to drug trafficking, organized crime, kidnapping, murder, and theft.

On the evening of 14 March 2014, his corpse was handed over to his sister and two nephews in Morelia by state authorities. As they left the forensic installations, they covered their faces in front of cameras and did not specify if they had plans to carry out a funeral for Moreno González. His family and friends, however, held a funeral for him at the Santa Cruz funeral home in Altozano, Morelia. They did not comment where the corpse was to be taken, but unconfirmed reports suggested that there were plans to cremate him and scatter his ashes at a village in the Tierra Caliente region in Michoacán.

== Personal life and family ==
Moreno González enjoyed watching the Godfather Trilogy and the drama film Braveheart.

He went by several nicknames, including but not limited to El Chayo (hypocorism for "Nazario" or "Rosario", the Spanish word for Rosary), Víctor Nazario Castrejón Peña, El Dulce ("The Candy"), El Doctor ("The Doctor"), and El Más Loco ("The Craziest One"), In 2014, the Mexican government discovered that the drug lord also held the alias Emiliano Morelos Guevara in reference to revolutionary figures Emiliano Zapata, José María Morelos, and Che Guevara.

His father was reportedly Manuel Moreno, who died in July 2013, according to intelligence reports from Mexican federal agents. The drug lord was the uncle or cousin of Uriel Chávez Mendoza, the municipal president (equivalent of mayor) of Apatzingán. He was arrested by Mexican authorities on 15 April 2014 for his alleged ties to organized crime. The city councilman Isidro Villanueva Moreno may also be his cousin too. His half brother and cousin of Plancarte Solís, Antonio Magaña Pantoja, was arrested by Mexican authorities in Apatzingán on 9 February 2014. His half brother Heliodoro Moreno Anguiano (alias "El Yoyo") was arrested by Mexican authorities in Apatzingán, Michoacán on 18 February 2014. His nephew Faustino Andrade González was arrested by the Mexican Federal Police in Apatzingán with four other suspected criminals on 5 June 2014.

== In popular culture ==
A character based on Moreno was featured in the 2017 television series El Chapo.

== Published works ==
- Pensamientos Del Más Loco (The Sayings of the Craziest One)
- Me Dicen: El Más Loco (They Call Me The Craziest One) (2010)

== See also ==
- Jesús Malverde

== Sources ==
=== Bibliography ===
- Lyman, Michael D. (2010). Drugs in Society: Causes, Concepts and Control (6th ed.). Elsevier. ISBN 978-1437744507.
- Levy, David A. (2011). Echoes of Mind: Thinking Deeply about Humanship (1st ed.). Enso Books. ISBN 978-0982018576.
- Longmire, Sylvia (2011). Cartel: The Coming Invasion of Mexico's Drug Wars (1st ed.). Palgrave Macmillan. ISBN 978-0230111370.
