= Knights Templar Cartel =

Mexican criminal organization

Los Caballeros Templarios
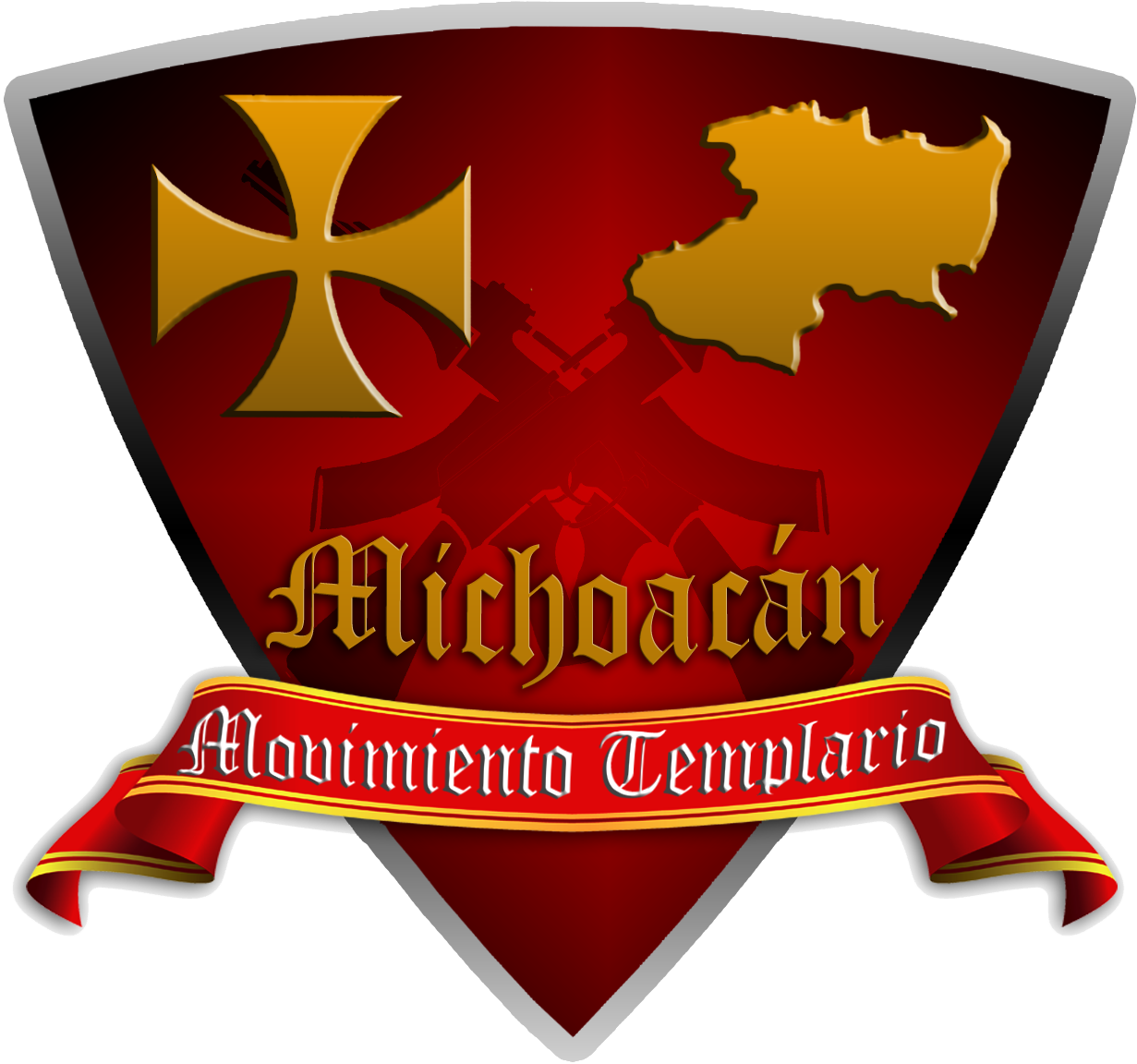
- Founded: December 9, 2010; 15 years ago
- Founding location: Michoacán, Mexico
- Years active: 2010–2017
- Territory: Michoacán, Mexico
- Ethnicity: Mexican
- Criminal activities: Drug trafficking, arms trafficking, kidnapping, extortion, racketeering, murder, robbery, assault, counterfeiting, money laundering.
- Allies: Gulf Cartel; Beltrán-Leyva Cartel; Sinaloa Cartel
- Rivals: Jalisco New Generation Cartel; Juarez Cartel; MS-13; Los Zetas; Independent Civilian vigilante and Militia groups Gente Nueva; La Familia Michoacana

The Knights Templar Cartel (Spanish: Los Caballeros Templarios, pronounced [los kaβaˈʝeɾos temˈplarjos]) was a Mexican criminal organization originally composed of the remnants of La Familia Michoacana drug cartel based in the Mexican State of Michoacán.

The Knights Templar Cartel used to indoctrinate its operatives to "fight and die" for the cartel. Before its collapse, the cartel took full control of the now defunct La Familia Michoacana operations in states including Michoacán, Guerrero, the state of Mexico, and Morelos.

== History ==
After the first alleged death of Francisco Montes and co-founder Nazario Moreno, leaders of the La Familia Michoacana cartel on 9 December 2010, a split between the cartel leaders emerged. Some of the cartel co-founders, Montes brothers Fred Montes CM and Frank Montes, Servando Gómez Martínez, and Dionisio Loya Plancarte, formed a cabal of La Familia calling itself Caballeros Templarios (or Knights Templar). A large part of La Familia Michoacana left with them to form the Knights Templar group, while José de Jesús Méndez Vargas kept the leadership of the then greatly diminished "Familia Michoacana", starting a fight for the control of Michoacán.

The Sinaloa Cartel, Gulf Cartel, La Familia Michoacana and the Knights Templar formed a short-lived joint enforcer gang called Cárteles Unidos (English: United Cartels) or La Resistencia, composed of well-trained gunmen dedicated to killing and expelling Los Zetas Cartel operatives invading the former La Familia Michoacana territories in Michoacán and Jalisco.

The Templars' most recent feud was against the Jalisco New Generation Cartel, which was trying to gain full control of Jalisco and Michoacán, and also against Civilian vigilante and militia groups that were fighting back the criminals in an attempt to clear Michoacan of the Knights Templar.

On 27 February 2015, Servando "La Tuta" Gómez, leader of the Knights Templar, was arrested by the Mexican federal police. A number of his associates were also arrested and many properties were seized by the Mexican government.

=== End of cartel ===
As of September 2017, it is believed the cartel has ceased to exist after its leader, Pablo "El 500" Toscano Padilla and his lieutenant Ezequiel "El Cheques" Castaneda, were reported to have been killed by remnants of La Nueva Familia Michoacana Organization while on their way to a regional meeting with members of the Jalisco New Generation Cartel to form an alliance with them. By May 2020, all 39 non-New Generation cartels operating in Guerrero were splinter cartels. In June 2020, it was reported that the Cartel del Abuelo and Los Viagras, as well as to a lesser extent the Jalisco New Generation Cartel, were the active cartels in Michoacán.

== Narco-banners ==
The former Pope Benedict XVI had a visit scheduled on 23 March 2012 to the Mexican state of Guanajuato. Prior to that date, on 17 March 2012, the Knights Templar Cartel allegedly put up 14 banners on the bridges of León, San Miguel de Allende, Irapuato, Salamanca, Yuriria, Moroleón and Uriangato, all municipalities of Guanajuato, pledging to not provoke any violent acts during the pope's visit. The banners read the following, "The Knights Templar Cartel will not partake in any warlike acts, we are not killers, welcome Pope (sic)".

There were other similar banners that were allegedly signed by their rivals, the Jalisco New Generation Cartel.

== Ethical code ==
The Knights Templar cartel was founded on a strict ethical code developed by La Tuta. The code was contained in a small book that was handed out to all members of the cartel and even to the public. The book was decorated with knights on horseback with lances and crosses. The 22-page book is titled "The Code of the Knights Templar of Michoacan" and contains the rules and regulations of the gang. The gang based its rules on those of the European Knights Templar. Members swear to help the poor and helpless, fight against materialism, respect women and children, not kill for money, and not use drugs. The Knights even go as far as drug testing all members. While the cartel has moved more towards accepting criminal acts prohibited by the ethical code, breaking the code can still incur punishment by death.

== See also ==
- Mexican drug war
- José Manuel Mireles Valverde, leader of a group of paramilitary self-defense groups that work against the Knights Templar Cartel
