= Enrique Plancarte Solís =

Mexican drug lord

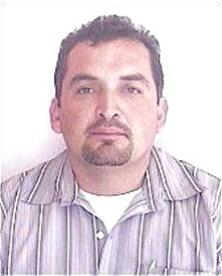
- Born: 14 September 1970; Nueva Italia, Michoacán, Mexico
- Died: 31 March 2014 (aged 43)
- Other names: La Chiva, El Kike
- Occupation: Leader of the Knights Templar
- Criminal charges: Drug trafficking, murder, extortion, money laundering, kidnapping
- Reward amount: Mexico: $10 Million Mexican Pesos; USA: $1.6 million USD

Enrique Plancarte Solís (14 September 1970 – 31 March 2014) was a Mexican drug lord and high-ranking leader of the Knights Templar Cartel, a drug cartel headquartered in the state of Michoacán. Prior to his tenure in the Knights Templar, he was a top leader of the split-off group La Familia Michoacana.

== Criminal career ==
Plancarte Solís was a high-ranking leader of La Familia Michoacana drug cartel. Following the reported death of Nazario Moreno González in 2010, La Familia Michoacana broke off and formed the Knights Templar Cartel, an organized crime gang based in the Mexican state of Michoacán. Plancarte was one of its top lieutenants. His duties were to coordinate the production and smuggling operations of methamphetamine from Mexico into US He was wanted by the governments of Mexico and the U.S.

== Kingpin Act sanction ==
On 25 February 2010, the United States Department of the Treasury sanctioned Plancarte Solís under the Foreign Narcotics Kingpin Designation Act (sometimes referred to simply as the "Kingpin Act"), for his involvement in drug trafficking along with twenty-one other international criminals and ten foreign entities. The act prohibited U.S. citizens and companies from doing any kind of business activity with him, and virtually froze all his assets in the U.S.

== Death ==
Plancarte Solís was killed in a gunfight with soldiers of the Mexican Navy on 31 March 2014 in Colón, Querétaro.

== Personal life and family ==
In 2014, the Mexican singer Melissa admitted to being Plancarte Solis' daughter. His cousin Jesús Ramírez Plancarte was arrested by Mexican security forces on 22 May 2014. His nephew Mario Loya Contreras was arrested by the Mexican Federal Police in Apatzingán with four other suspected criminals on 5 June 2014.

== See also ==
- Mexican drug war
- Mérida Initiative
- War on drugs
