= La Familia Michoacana =

Mexican cartel and organized crime syndicate

La Familia Michoacana Cartel
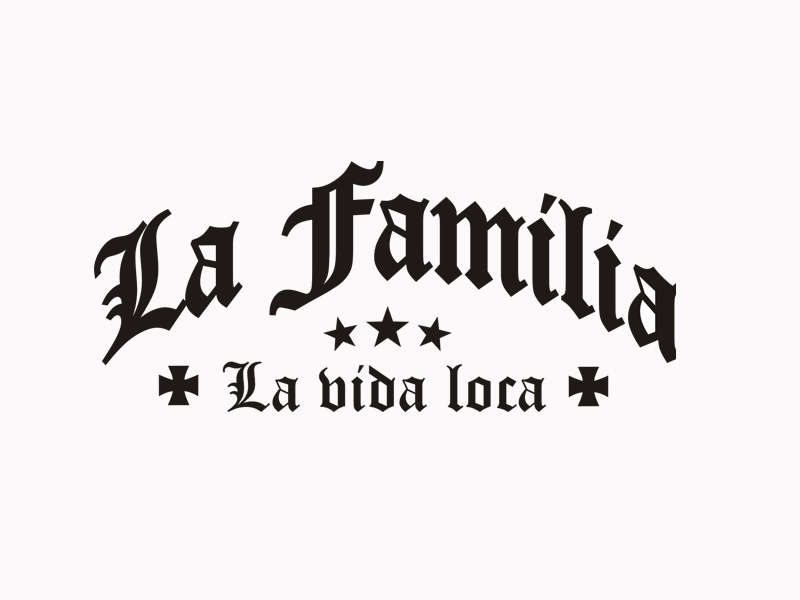
- "La vida loca" logo Area of influence of La Familia Michoacana Michoacán, Guerrero, and State of Mexico highlighted
- Founded: 1980
- Founded by: Carlos Rosales
- Founding location: La Piedad, Michoacán, Mexico
- Years active: 1980-present
- Territory: Mexico: Michoacán, Guerrero, Edomex, Mexico City, Morelos, Hidalgo, Chiapas, Jalisco, Colima, Guanajuato, United States: North Carolina, California, Nevada, Arizona, New Mexico, Texas, Michigan, Oregon, Washington, Kentucky, Illinois, Ohio, Indiana
- Ethnicity: Mexican
- Membership (est.): 2,000
- Criminal activities: Drug trafficking, people smuggling, money laundering, racketeering, extortion, kidnapping, murder, arms trafficking, assault, counterfeiting
- Allies: Sinaloa Cartel; La Nueva Familia Michoacana; Los Viagras; Menace of Destruction; Mara Salvatrucha; Beltrán-Leyva Cartel (defunct); Los Tequileros; Guerreros Unidos; Juarez Cartel; Tijuana Cartel; Los Zetas (Since 2004); Rural Defense Force
- Rivals: Knights Templar Cartel (defunct); La Unión Tepito; Jalisco New Generation Cartel; Mexico; United States

La Familia Michoacana (Spanish pronunciation: [la faˈmilja miʧoaˈkana], LFM; English: The Michoacán Family), La Familia (English: The Family), is a Mexican drug cartel and organized crime syndicate based in the Mexican state of Michoacán. They are known to produce large amounts of methamphetamine in clandestine laboratories in Michoacan. Formerly allied to the Gulf Cartel—as part of Los Zetas—it split off in 2006. The cartel was founded by Carlos Rosales Mendoza, a close associate of Osiel Cárdenas. The second leader, Nazario Moreno González, known as El Más Loco (English: The Craziest One), preached his organization's divine right to eliminate enemies. He carried a "bible" of his own sayings and insisted that his army of traffickers and hitmen avoid using the narcotics they produce and sell. Nazario Moreno's partners were José de Jesús Méndez Vargas, Servando Gómez Martínez and Enrique Plancarte Solís, each of whom has a bounty of $2 million for his capture, and were contesting the control of the organization.

In July 2009 and November 2010, La Familia Michoacana offered to retreat and even disband their cartel, "with the condition that both the Federal Government, and State and Federal Police commit to safeguarding the security of the state of Michoacán." However, President Felipe Calderón's government refused to strike a deal with the cartel and rejected their calls for dialogue. According to federal and state sources, La Familia Michoacana has been increasingly involved in Michoacán's politics, impelling their favorite candidates, financing their campaigns, and forcing other parties to renounce their candidacies. As of 2011, La Familia Michoacana still exists, mostly active in Estado de Mexico, despite the killing of its founder and leader Nazario Moreno González. Several leaders split off after his death to form the Knights Templar Cartel and La Nueva Familia Michoacana.

== History ==
Mexican analysts believe that La Familia formed in the 1980s with the stated purpose of bringing order to Michoacán, emphasizing help and protection for the poor. In its initial incarnation, La Familia formed as a group of vigilantes, spurred to power to counter interloping kidnappers and drug dealers, who were their stated enemies. Since then, La Familia has capitalized on its reputation, building its myth, power and reach to transition into a criminal gang itself.

La Familia came to the foreground in the 1990s as the Gulf Cartel's paramilitary group, designed to seize control of the illegal drug trade in Michoacán state from rival drug cartels. While it initially trained with Los Zetas, in 2006 the group splintered off into an independent drug trafficking operation. La Familia has a strong rivalry with both Los Zetas and the Beltrán-Leyva Cartel, but strong ties with the Sinaloa Cartel of Joaquin Guzman. La Familia Michoacana was one of the strongest and fastest growing cartels in Mexico.

After the death of Nazario Moreno González, José de Jesús Méndez Vargas (El Chango Méndez) took control of the cartel. However, his authority was disputed by the cartel co-founders Enrique Plancarte Solís and Servando Gómez Martínez (La Tuta), who formed an offshoot of La Familia calling itself Caballeros Templarios (Knights Templar). Méndez Vargas was captured on June 21, 2011, by Mexican police in the state of Aguascalientes. The Mexican Federal Police declared that the cartel has been disbanded. However, the organization continued to exercise its power and influence throughout Michoacán and Guerrero states.

In 2017, former La Familia leader Arnoldo Rueda-Medina, who was arrested in Mexico in 2009, was extradited to the United States and sentenced to 45 years in prison in 2018 after being convicted on drug trafficking charges.

=== References to religion ===
La Familia cartel is sometimes described as quasi-religious since its leaders, Moreno González and Méndez Vargas, refer to their assassinations and beheadings as "divine justice". The cartel may have direct or indirect ties with devotees of the New Jerusalem religious movement, which is noted for its concern for justice issues. La Familia's boss and spiritual leader Nazario Moreno González, (a.k.a.: El Más Loco or The Craziest One) published his own 'bible,' and a copy seized by Mexican federal agents reveals an ideology that mixes evangelical-style self-help with insurgent peasant slogans. Moreno González, who was killed on December 9, 2010, seems to have based most of his doctrine on a work by Christian writer John Eldredge, using his own understanding of the idea in Eldredge's message that every man must have "a battle to fight, a beauty to rescue and an adventure to live." The Mexican justice department stated in a report that Gonzalez Moreno has made Eldredge's book Salvaje de Corazón (Wild at Heart) required reading for La Familia gang members and has paid rural teachers and National Development Education (CONAFE) to circulate Eldredge's writings throughout the Michoacán countryside. La Familia cartel emphasizes religion and family values during recruitment and has placed banners in areas of operations claiming that it does not tolerate substance abuse or exploitation of women and children. According to Mexico Public Safety Secretary Genaro Garcia Luna, it recruits members from drug rehabilitation clinics by helping addicts recover and then forcing them into service for the drug cartel or be killed. Advancement within the organization depends as much on regular attendance at prayer meetings as on target practice. The cartel gives loans to farmers, businesses, schools and churches, and it advertises its benevolence in local newspapers in order to gain social support.

On July 16, 2009, Servando Gómez Martínez (La Tuta), the cartel operations chief, contacted a local radio station and stated: "La Familia was created to look after the interests of our people and our family. We are a necessary evil." When asked what La Familia really wanted, Gómez replied, "The only thing we want is peace and tranquility." President Felipe Calderón's government refuses to strike a deal with the cartel and rejected their calls for dialogue.

On April 20, 2009, about 400 Federal Police agents raided a christening party for a baby born to a cartel member. Among the 44 detained was Rafael Cedeño Hernández (El Cede), the gang's second in command and in charge of indoctrinating the new recruits in the cartel's religious values, morals and ethics.

=== Alliances ===
In February 2010, the major cartels aligned in two factions. One was made up of the Juárez Cartel, Tijuana Cartel, Los Zetas, and the Beltrán-Leyva Cartel. The other faction was made up of the Gulf Cartel, Sinaloa Cartel, and La Familia Michoacana. La Familia Michoacana became a rival of its splinter group Knights Templar. Mexican Attorney General (PGR) reported that La Familia Cartel was "exterminated" by 2011.

== Operations ==
La Familia has been known to be unusually violent. Its members use murder and torture to quash rivals, while building a social base in the Mexican state of Michoacán. It once was the fastest-growing cartel in the country's drug war and is a religious cult-like group that celebrates family values. In one incident in Uruapan in 2006, the cartel members tossed five severed heads onto the dance floor of the Sol y Sombra night club along with a message that read: "The Family doesn't kill for money. It doesn't kill women. It doesn't kill innocent people, only those who deserve to die. Know that this is divine justice."

Like other cartels, La Familia used the port city of Lázaro Cárdenas, Michoacán to import narcotics from Peru and Colombia. They also produced large amounts of methamphetamine along the highlands of the Sierra Madre. The cartel has moved from smuggling and selling drugs and turned itself into a much more ambitious criminal organization which acts as a parallel state in much of Michoacán. It extorts "taxes" from businesses, pays for community projects, controls petty crime, and settles some local disputes. Despite its short history, it has emerged as Mexico's largest supplier of methamphetamines to the United States, with supply channels running deep into the Midwestern United States, and has increasingly become involved in the distribution of cocaine, marijuana, and other narcotics. Michael Braun, former DEA chief of operations, states that it operates "superlabs" in Mexico capable of producing up to 100 pounds of meth in eight hours. However, according to DEA officials, it claims to oppose the sale of drugs to Mexicans. It also sells unlicensed DVDs, smuggles people to the United States, and runs a debt-collecting service by kidnapping defaulters. Because oftentimes they use fake and sometimes original uniforms of several police agencies, most of their kidnap victims are stopped under false pretenses of routine inspections or report of stolen vehicles, and then taken hostage.

La Familia has also bought some local politicians. 20 municipal officials have been murdered in Michoacán, including two mayors. Having established its authority, it then names local police chiefs. In May 2009, the Mexican Federal Police detained 10 Michoacán mayors and 20 other local officials suspected of being associated with the cartel.

On July 11, 2009, a cartel lieutenant—Arnoldo Rueda Medina—was arrested. La Familia members attacked the Federal Police station in Morelia to try to free Rueda shortly after his arrest. During the attacks, two soldiers and three federal policemen were killed. When that failed, cartel members attacked Federal Police installations in at least a half-dozen Michoacán cities in retribution.

Three days later, on July 14, 2009, the cartel tortured and murdered twelve Mexican Federal Police agents and dumped their bodies along the side of a mountain highway along with a written message: "So that you come for another. We will be waiting for you here." The federal agents were investigating crime in Michoacán state; President Calderón, responded to the violence by dispatching additional 1,000 Federal Police officers to the area. The infusion, which more than tripled the number of Federal Police officers patrolling Michoacán, angered Michoacán Governor Leonel Godoy Rangel, who called it 'an occupation' and said he had not been consulted. Days later, 10 municipal police officers were arrested in connection with the slayings of the 12 federal agents.

The governor's half-brother Julio César Godoy Toscano, who was elected July 5, 2009 to the lower house of Congress, was accused of being a top-ranking member of La Familia Michoacana drug cartel and of providing political protection for the cartel. Based on these charges, on December 14, 2010, Godoy Toscano was impeached from the lower house of Congress and therefore lost his parliamentary immunity; he fled and remains a fugitive.

President Calderón stated that the country's drug cartels had grown so powerful that they now posed a threat to the future of Mexican democracy. His strategy of direct confrontation and law enforcement is not popular with some segments of Mexican society, where battling violent drug gangs has brought out several human rights charges against the Mexican military.

=== Project Coronado ===
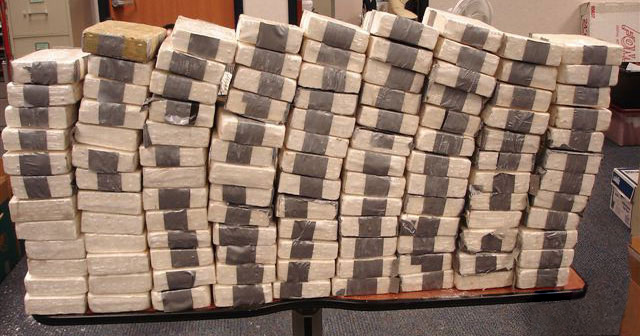
Kilograms of cocaine seized

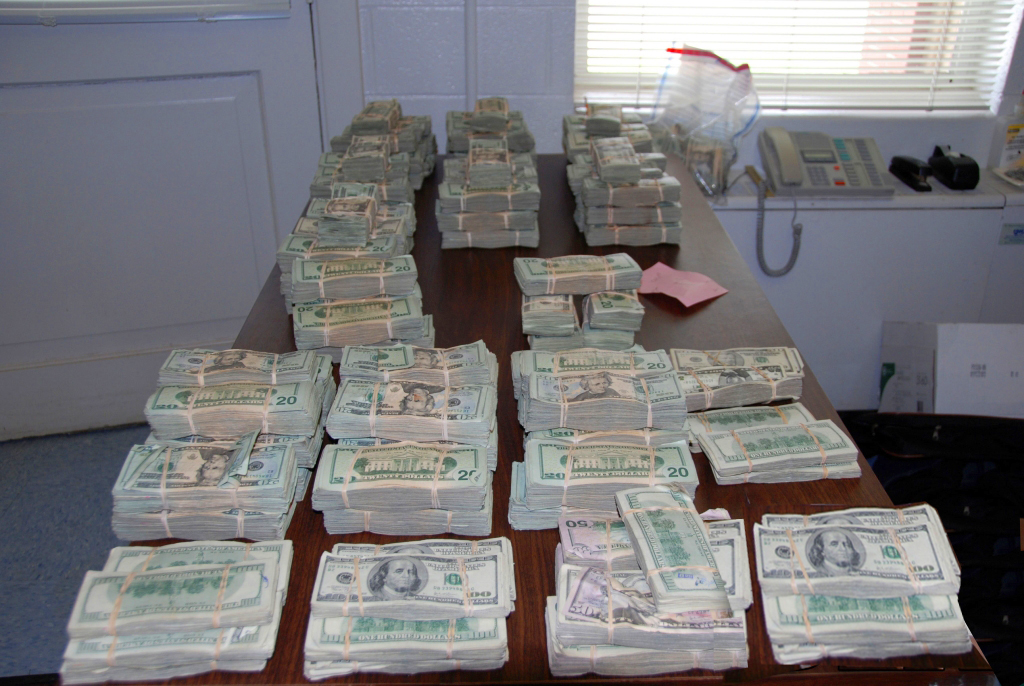
Small part of US currency seized

On October 22, 2009, U.S. federal authorities announced the results of a four-year investigation into the operations of La Familia Michoacana in the United States dubbed Project Coronado. It was the largest U.S. raid ever against Mexican drug cartels operating in the U.S. In 19 different states, 303 individuals were taken into custody in a coordinated effort by local, state, and federal law enforcement over a two-day period. Seized during the arresting phase was over 62 kilograms (137 lb) of cocaine, 330 kilograms (730 lb) of methamphetamine, 440 kilograms (970 lb) of marijuana, 144 weapons, 109 vehicles, two clandestine drug laboratories, and $3.4 million in U.S. currency.

Since the start of "Project Coronado", the investigation has led to the arrest of more than 1,186 people and the seizure of approximately $33 million. Overall, almost 2 metric tons (2.2 short tons) of cocaine, 1,240 kilograms (2,730 lb) of methamphetamine, 13 kilograms (29 lb) of heroin, 7,430 kilograms (16,380 lb) of marijuana, 389 weapons, 269 vehicles, and the two drug labs were seized.

Multi-agency investigations such as Project Coronado were the key to disrupting the operations of complex criminal organizations like La Familia. The investigative efforts in Project Coronado were coordinated by the multi-agency Special Operations Division, comprising agents and analysts from the DEA, FBI, U.S. Immigration and Customs Enforcement, Internal Revenue Service, U.S. Customs and Border Protection, U.S. Marshals Service and ATF, as well as attorneys from the Criminal Division's Narcotic and Dangerous Drug Section. More than 300 federal, state, local and foreign law enforcement agencies contributed investigative and prosecutorial resources to Project Coronado through the Organized Crime Drug Enforcement Task Force.

=== Project Delirium ===
In July 2011, the United States Department of Justice announced that a 20-month-long operation known as "Project Delirium" had resulted in more than 221 arrests of La Familia cartel members in the United States, along with significant seizures of cash, cocaine, heroin, and methamphetamine. Outside of the United States, the operation resulted in the arrest of more than 1,900 members. Cartel members were arrested across the United States, and face charges in Alabama, California, Colorado, Georgia, Kansas, Michigan, Minnesota, Missouri, New Mexico, North Carolina, Tennessee, Texas, and Washington, D.C. This announcement came just a month after Mexican authorities announced the capture of cartel leader José de Jesús Méndez Vargas.

=== The Interstate 75 Connection ===
It has been known that La Familia has certain connections with the Flores Camargo cartel, a small drug trafficking group that operates in Atlanta. Flores Camargo moves large quantities of high grade marijuana and cocaine through the I-75 corridor for distribution in Detroit, supplying the city and its outskirts and suburbs. The local authorities haven't been able to dismantle this trafficking group because of its experience. They have made several arrests but have never been able to locate Flores Camargo's heads. It is known that two cousins originally from the Mexican state of Guanajuato run it, but no photos or names have been obtained by authorities. This shows how trafficking groups are becoming more cunning in hiding from federal authorities. The federal authorities have known that the group smuggles high grade marijuana and cocaine from Guanajuato, traveling up to the border and passing under secret tunnels. DEA agents have received tips saying the groups move up to 2 tons of high grade marijuana to a central hub in Atlanta, then up through I75 to Detroit where it is repackaged into small quantities and spread throughout the city. The money is never tracked because no bank accounts are used. This group is known to have military style weapons obtained from their cartel connections in the United States and Mexico. They show off their luxury life on social networks but the authorities don't have any evidence to arrest the two cousins or other known associates.

=== Knights Templar ===
The alleged death of Nazario Moreno González on December 9, 2010, led to a split among cartel leaders José de Jesús Méndez Vargas, Enrique Plancarte Solís, and Servando Gómez Martínez. This led the former leaders of La Familia Michoacana, Plancarte and Gomez, to form the Knights Templar cartel, while Jesús Méndez kept the leadership of the formerly disbanded La Familia Michoacana.

== See also ==
- List of Mexican cartels
- List of Mexico's 37 most-wanted drug lords
