= José de Jesús Méndez Vargas =

Mexican drug lord

- Born: February 28, 1961 (age 65); El Aguaje, Michoacán, Mexico
- Other name: El Chango
- Occupation: Leader of La Familia Michoacana
- Status: Extradited to the United States
- Criminal charges: Drug trafficking, extortion, kidnapping, murder

José de Jesús Méndez Vargas (born 28 February 1961), commonly referred to by his alias El Chango ("The Ape"), is a Mexican drug lord and former leader of the now disbanded La Familia drug cartel, headquartered in the state of Michoacán.

Méndez took control of the cartel after its former leader, Nazario Moreno, was allegedly killed in a shootout with Mexican Federal Police on December 9, 2010. His protection was the responsibility of twelve gunmen he called the "Twelve Apostles". His leadership, however, was disputed by Servando Gómez Martínez and Enrique Plancarte Solís who left the organization and formed the Knights Templar. He was arrested on June 21, 2011. He was eventually extradited to the United States on February 27, 2025.

== Kingpin Act sanction ==
On 25 February 2010, the United States Department of the Treasury sanctioned Méndez under the Foreign Narcotics Kingpin Designation Act (sometimes referred to simply as the "Kingpin Act"), for his involvement in drug trafficking along with twenty-one other international criminals and ten foreign entities. The act prohibited U.S. citizens and companies from doing any kind of business activity with him, and virtually froze all his assets in the U.S.

== Arrest ==
Méndez was captured at a road checkpoint on June 21, 2011 by Mexican Federal police in the state of Aguascalientes. The Mexican government had offered a $30 million pesos (US$2.1 million) bounty for information leading to Méndez's capture. On 8 April 2014, a Mexican federal court rejected Méndez's writ of amparo (equivalent to an injunction) to prevent his extradition to the United States, where he is wanted in a New York federal court for drug trafficking offenses.

== Extradition to the United States ==
On 27 February 2025, Méndez along with 28 other narco figures were extradited to the United States.

== See also ==
- War on drugs
- Mexican drug war
- Mérida Initiative
- List of Mexico's 37 most-wanted drug lords
