= SEIDO =

Deputy Attorney Specialized Investigation of Organized Crime Subprocuraduría Especializada en investigación de Delincuencia Organizada
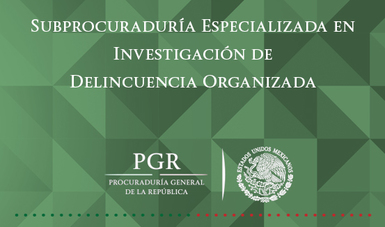
- Abbreviation: SEIDO

Agency overview
- Preceding agency: Fiscalia Especializada para la Atencion a Delitos Contra la Salud (FEADS)

Jurisdictional structure
- Federal agency: Mexico
- Operations jurisdiction: Mexico
- General nature: Federal law enforcement; Civilian police

Operational structure
- Parent agency: Attorney General of México

Website
- http://www.pgr.gob.mx/Paginas/default.aspx

The Deputy Attorney General's Office for Specialized Investigation of Organized Crime (Spanish: Subprocuraduría Especializada en Investigación de Delincuencia Organizada, SEIDO) is the organized crime investigatory division of Mexico's Attorney General's Office.

== History and Organization ==
SEIDO was formed in the wake of a 2003 scandal that found agents in the Attorney General's anti-narcotics prosecution office, FEADS, actively working for or protecting Mexican drug cartels. As a result, SEIDO was formed with 117 agents whose backgrounds and psychological profiles were intensely researched, in the hope that agents prone to cartel corruption would be weeded out before they could enter the force.

In October 2012, the organization changed its name from SIEDO to SEIDO.
