= Operation Chihuahua =

2008 Mexican military and federal police operation

Operation Chihuahua/Juarez
- Part of Mexican drug war
Date	27 March 2008 – present
Location	Chihuahua, Mexico
Result	Ongoing

Belligerents
Mexico: Mexican Army; Mexican Marines; Federal Police	Sinaloa Cartel; Gente Nueva; Los Mexicles; Artistas Asesinos	Juárez Cartel; La Línea

Commanders and leaders
(Mexico) Claudia Sheinbaum (2024–Present) (Mexico) Andrés Manuel López Obrador (2018–2024) (Mexico) Enrique Peña Nieto (2012–18) (Mexico) Felipe Calderón (2008–12) (Mexico) Guillermo Galván Galván (2008–12) (Mexico) Salvador Cienfuegos Zepeda (2012–18) (Mexico) Luis Cresencio Sandoval (2018–present) (Mexico) Mariano Francisco Saynez Mendoza (2008–12) (Mexico) Vidal Francisco Soberón Sanz (2012–18) (Mexico) José Rafael Ojeda Durán (2018–present)	Joaquín Guzmán Loera (Captured); Ismael Zambada García	Vicente Carrillo Fuentes (Captured); Jose Luis Fratello

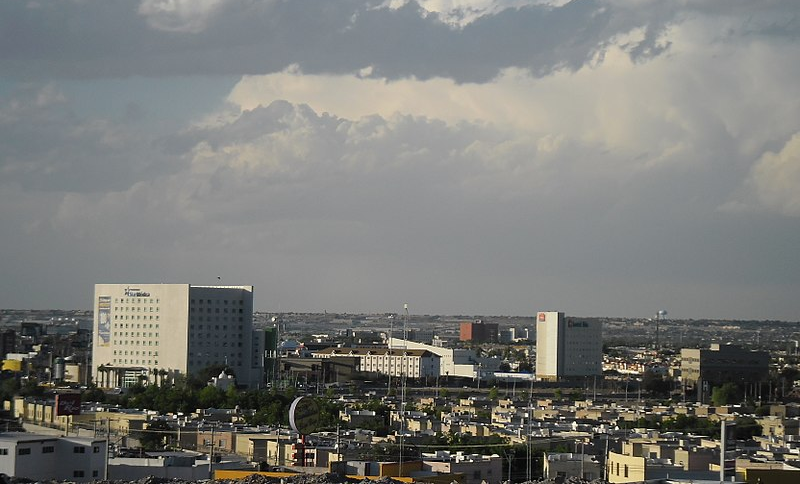
Ciudad Juárez

Coordinated Operation Chihuahua or formerly known as Joint Operation Chihuahua is a Military and Federal Police operation started in 2008 by the Mexican Army and Policía Federal Preventiva. The objective is to "besiege" Ciudad Juárez to concentrate forces and saturate the area to confront the three cartels already operating in the city. Ciudad Juárez is known to be one of the most dangerous cities in the Americas. In the year 2007 more than 100 police officers were killed in Juárez in attacks blamed on organized crime. As a result of drug cartel violence, President Felipe Calderón has previously launched other Joint Operations in other states.

== Background ==
=== Ciudad Juárez and Violence ===
In 2008, Ciudad Juárez was designated as “The City of the Future” by the prestigious magazine “Foreign Direct Investment” published by the influential “Financial Times group.”. However, the city is also a site of widespread poverty and violence, including an infamous series of unsolved murders of female factory workers. The violence generated by the war of the drug cartels for control of drug routes translated into some 6,000 killings in 2008. More than 1,600 of them occurred in Juárez, three times more than the most murderous city in the United States. As of July 14, 2009, the body count in Juárez surpassed 1000, which is an acceleration over the year 2008. This mark was not reached in 2008 until over two months later: September 16.

=== Declaration of War against The Cartels ===
On December 1, 2006, President Felipe Calderón assumed office and declared war on drug traffickers. Troops and Federal Police forces were ordered to move into hot zones where drug cartels operated—especially in Michoacán, Tamaulipas, and Ciudad Juárez. Calderón also imposed a cap on salaries of high-ranking public servants and ordered a raise on the salaries of the Federal Police and federal armed forces. Since early 2007, 2,500 Mexican troops have been sent to Juárez to combat organized crime.

== 2008 ==
=== Earlier events ===
On February 17, troops from the 20th Motorized Cavalry Regiment carrying out a surveillance mission in Ciudad Juárez raided a safe house belonging to the Juárez Cartel; in the raid 21 suspects were arrested along with the arrest, a large amount of drugs, weapons, ammunition, military and police uniforms and three vehicles were seized. On March 7 in the capital city of Chihuahua, acting on an anonymous tip troops from the 23rd Infantry Battalion confronted a group of gunmen which opened fire and threw grenades at soldiers who also returned fire. six of the gunmen were killed while three were arrested. The army reported that five soldiers were injured and one soldier with the rank of 1st Captain was also killed.

=== Joint Operation Chihuahua begins ===
On March 27, Secretary of the Interior Juan Camilo Mouriño announced of Joint Operation Chihuahua as a strategy to combat organize crime in the state. That same day members of SEDENA, SSP, and The Attorney General Eduardo Medina Mora met to discuss the operation. The government ordered 2,026 army troops and Federal Police officers equipped with 180 vehicles, to reinforce the army garrisons already placed there sixteen Joint Operation bases were installed that are made up Army and Federal Police forces.

On March 29, three Air Force C-130's and one Boeing 727 transporting 392 troops arrived at Ciudad Juárez Abraham González International Airport, and by land 805 troops equipped with 116 vehicles belonging to the army's 3rd Independent Infantry Brigade arrived later on that day.

On April 8, in the city of Villa Ahumada, the Army received information of a funeral process that was held for a drug trafficker known as Gerardo Gallegos who belonged to the criminal group of the Juárez Cartel. It is assumed that Gerardo Gallegos died in a gun battle with rival groups in Hidalgo del Parral. The army quickly mobilized two units; the first ground unit composed of 35 soldiers equipped with 4 military vehicles from the 76th Infantry Battalion, the second Air unit composed of 15 personnel from the army's Parachute Rifle Special Forces Brigade equipped with one Mi-17 and an MD 503. The Air Unit was sent to the cemetery area to conduct a recon screen, armed men were found to be in the target area which opened fire on the helicopters, but did not manage any impact. Civilians who panic dispersed either running or driving away from the gun battle; simultaneously the air unit descended upon the area giving chase to the gunmen while in the same moment the ground unit arrived and arrested 8 of the assailants, two AK-47's, one M4 Carbine, and one Ruger rifle. With one of the suspects being a Municipal Police Officer of Villa Ahumada at the time.

On May 17, presumed members of the Sinaloa Cartel attacked Villa Ahumada, Chihuahua, and killed the police chief, two officers, and three civilians, as well as kidnapping at least 10 additional people. On the same day acting on information from an anonymous source, military personnel from the 76th Infantry Battalion and 4th Armored Reconnaissance Regiment were sent to a ranch called "El Alto" located near the town of Hidalgo del Parral. Upon arriving they were met with gunfire from the interior of the ranch. Soldiers returned fired and continued to proceed with the assault with results of 11 men being arrested and various weapons captured.

On November 28, gunmen in Ciudad Juárez killed eight people at a restaurant. On December 8, Six people were killed when gunmen opened fire inside a pool hall.

== 2009 ==
- On February 10, Assailants kidnapped 9 people in Villa Ahumada, Chihuahua. They were then pursued by the military to a ranch located 12 km south of the Garita de Samalayuca, where at least 21 people were killed. The fatalities includes one soldier, 6 of the 9 prisoners and 14 assailants that were killed by the army. This event shares much with the attack of May 17, 2008, and it is presumed that the attackers were members of the Sinaloa Cartel.
- On February 14, In the municipality of Villa Ahumada, 125 kilometers south of Ciudad Juárez, troops on patrol fought a gunbattle with cartel gunmen, leaving three assailants dead.

=== Resignation of Ciudad Juárez Police Chief ===
- On February 20, Ciudad Juárez Police Chief Robert Orduna announced his resignation after two police officers were killed. Drug traffickers had threatened to kill a police officer every 48 hours until the chief resigned. The change in command in Juárez's police force comes in the wake of a campaign of intimidation by a drug cartel that had the border city in its grip. Orduna is credited in replacing half of the 1,600-person police force with new recruits in a bid to rid it of corrupt members.

=== Attack on The Governor ===
- On February 22, five assailants attacked the convoy of Chihuahua governor, José Reyes Baeza, killing a bodyguard, and wounding two.

=== Government response to the ongoing violence ===
As a result of the ongoing violence in Juárez, the federal government ordered an extra 5,000 troops from the 11th Military Region and federal police officers equipped with armed helicopters, transport and armored vehicles to the area to put an end on organize once and for all. The reinforcements will assist the 2,500 soldiers and Federal Police officers that were sent in the early year of 2007.

On March 1, out of the 5,000 troops, 1,800 troops arrived in Ciudad Juárez. Army troops arrived onboard 90 vehicles of various types and integrated with the 20th Motorized Cavalry Regiment inside the town. A day later the last 3,200 army troops arrived by air and land.

=== Disarmament of the Police force ===
- On March 18, military personnel disarmed 1,600 Ciudad Juárez Municipal police officers. Some Municipal personnel were used to transport soldiers on patrol assignments since they already know the area, others were sent home and were told they were not going to be paid. This new event was approved by the city's Mayor José Reyes Ferriz

=== Four days of silence and ongoing violence ===
- On March 19, since the arrival of the Army and Federal Police forces, Juárez was given breathing room from violence. Since 2008 and the week before the arrival of Government forces the city was recognized as the most violent in the country with 12 executions a day. But after four days of silence, violence returned in Chihuahua when two men were reported killed in a vehicle in the colony of Puerta del Sol, also killed was a staff member of the city's secretary of traffic, two other civilians were reported murdered.
- On March 25, in the city of Chihuahua, Salais Juan Gutierrez, commander of the area of various crimes of the Attorney General State of Justice department was executed by gunmen. Also reported were another four men involved in organized crime were killed in the city, and one more in Ciudad Juárez.
- On April 4, six bodies were found in tortured in a rural highway in Guachochi, Chihuahua.
  - Durango Governor Ismael Hernández Deras demanded that the federal government send "fully armed and armored" Federal Police forces to the state as a result of increasing violence as cause by the Joint Operations in Chihuahua and in Sinaloa, and 9 men were found murdered in the city of Chihuahua
- On August 2, 8 men were found dead in Ciudad Juárez and one more in the city of Chihuahua
- Officials will make a decision on whether to withdraw the troops is expected before September 15. The mayor of Ciudad Juárez is asking federal authorities not to pull military units out of the region for at least another six months.
- In a strip bar in Ciudad Juárez, gunmen burst in and opened fire killing five people and one U.S. airman Staff Sgt. David Booher. Booher had been assigned to the medical unit of the 49th Fighter Wing at Holloman Air Force Base outside Alamogordo, N.M.

== 2010 ==
On January 13, Secretariat of Public Security Genaro García Luna informed that he will send another 2,000 Federal Police forces to Ciudad Juárez. On the same day, an armed group consisting of dozens of gunmen attempted to kidnap three military personnel, but they managed to escape.

On January 16, the federal government transferred security operations command from the Army to the Secretary of Public Security, also renaming the security operations to Coordinated Operation Chihuahua.

On April 23, in Ciudad Juarez, gunmen ambushed two police vehicles while in a busy intersection, killing six police officers and also killing a 17-year-old girl. A Chihuahua State's spokesman confirmed that five of the officers were federal and one was municipal. Authorities recovered two of the three vehicles used in the attack. On the same day, federal authorities announced 16 federal police officers have been detained and accused of extortion, robbery, abuse of authority and breaking and entering.
