= Gente Nueva =

Mexican criminal organization

- Founded: 2008 by Noel Salgueiro Nevárez
- Founding location: Chihuahua, Mexico Veracruz, Mexico
- Years active: 2007-present
- Territory: Sinaloa, Mexicali, Acapulco, Sonora, Ciudad Juárez
- Ethnicity: Mexican
- Membership (est.): 5,000
- Activities: Drug trafficking, kidnapping, murder
- Allies: Sinaloa Cartel; Artistas Asesinos; Los Mexicles; Los Antrax; Los Guanos
- Rivals: Los Zetas; Juárez Cartel; La Línea; Los Muertos; Knights Templar Cartel; CJNG; La Mayiza; Cartel de Caborca; Beltran Leyva; Los Rusos; Los Memos

Gente Nueva (English: New People), also known as Los Chapos, in reference to their drug lord Joaquín Guzmán Loera, is a large group of well-trained and experienced gunmen that function as one of the elite armed wings of the Sinaloa Cartel, created to counter, battle and destroy the Juárez Cartel's influence in the Mexican north-west, as well as to battle and destroy La Línea which is currently the Juárez Cartel's largest remaining cell.

Gente Nueva dates back to 1995 when Noel Salgueiro Nevárez “El Flaco/El 6” begun his criminal career in the Mexican state of Chihuahua under the Sinaloa Federation. Gente Nueva has served as the main branch of the organization in Ciudad Juárez and in the rest of the state, where they have engaged in a four-year war with the Juárez Cartel and its enforcer wing, La Línea, for the control of the smuggling routes to the United States. Amid the internal struggles and infightings in the Juárez cartel, Gente Nueva began to recruit the cartel's members.

By 2012, U.S. intelligence indicated that the Sinaloa cartel and Gente Nueva have emerged victorious and successfully relegated the Juárez cartel to the sidelines. The El Paso–Juárez corridor is a lucrative route for drug traffickers because the DEA estimates that about 70% of the cocaine that enters the United States flows through that area.

== History ==
=== Sinaloa Cartel-Juárez Cartel turf war ===
Battle between Sinaloa cartel and Juárez cartel for Ciudad Juárez
- Part of Mexican drug war
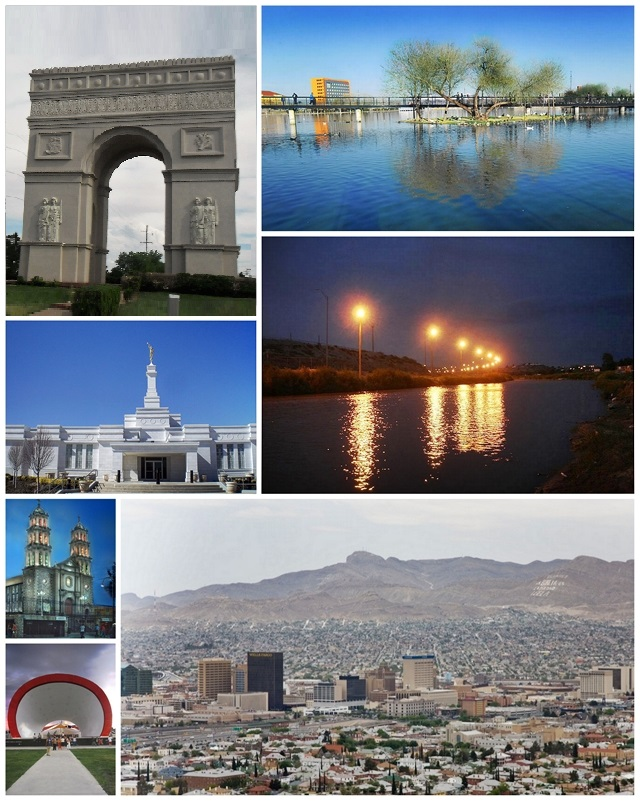
- Images of Ciudad Juárez, the location of the conflict between the rival cartels. From 2010 to 2011, Ciudad Juárez was ranked first among the most dangerous cities in the world.
Date	2008-ongoing
Location	Ciudad Juárez-Chihuahua, Mexico
Status	Ongoing

Belligerents
Sinaloa cartel	Juárez cartel	Mexican army	CJNG

Commanders and leaders
Joaquín Guzmán Loera; Ismael Zambada García	Vicente Carrillo Fuentes; Vicente Carrillo Leyva; Juan Pablo Ledezma	Felipe Calderón; Luis Cresencio Sandoval	

Units involved
Sinaloa cartel: Los Ántrax	Juárez cartel: La Linea; Los Zetas (With support)	Mexican army: Mexican Navy	

Strength
+20.000 between soldiers and hit men, +1.500 Narco tanks, +100.000 armored vehicles and +100 Narco-submarine	+10.000 between soldiers and hit men, +500 Narco tanks and +50.000 armored vehicles	10.000 soldiers, one AMX-VCI tank, 5.000 military armored vehicles and 15 military helicopters	

Casualties and losses
Unknown	Unknown	Unknown	
- In total 10,000 deaths and +100,000 injured, many arrests, 5 narco tanks destroyed, 5 military helicopters shot down, one narco-submarine sunk, and numerous narco-laboratories for the manufacture of narco tanks, improvised fighting vehicles and drugs shut down by the Mexican army. More than 500,000 cars and improvised fighting vehicles destroyed or damaged, 500 military armored vehicles, 15 billion dollars confiscated from the cartels, numerous tons of drugs requisitioned from the cartels and numerous weapons and ammunition deposits confiscated from the cartels.

The war between the Juárez Cartel and the Sinaloa Cartel for the control of the smuggling routes in Ciudad Juárez broke out on 5 January 2008, when five men were shot dead with AR-15s in a matter of hours; within a few days, several policemen and nearly two dozen civilians lay dead. The Juárez cartel used La Mafia and Los Muertos to fight off the forces of the Sinaloa cartel, which had employed the gangs known as Artistas Asesinos and Los Mexicles, along with its armed wing, Gente Nueva. The turf wars between them have left more than 10,000 dead in four years.

When Joaquín "El Chapo" Guzmán, the leader of the Sinaloa Cartel, jumped into the territory of the Juárez organization in 2007, he attempted to split his rival organization and recruit the dissidents into his own invasion force – Gente Nueva.

Gente Nueva is responsible for a number of crimes, including but not limited to extortions, kidnappings, tortures, and assassinations.

==== Ciudad Juárez rehab center attack ====
Masked gunmen stormed the El Cristal Military education center in Ciudad Juárez, Chihuahua on 3 September 2009, gathered all of the patients together against a wall at a central patio, and then opened fire at them with AK-47 rifles. 18 patients were killed in the attack and two others were left wounded. When the Mexican authorities removed the dead bodies, a thick layer of blood was left at the concrete floor of the clinic, from the entrance to the sleep quarters. Local newspapers stated that the gunmen were plotting to kill members of Los Muertos, a rival gang at the service of the Juárez Cartel. In February 2012 in León, Guanajuato – José Antonio Torres Marrufo – a leader of Gente Nueva, was arrested and found responsible for ordering the attack. Gente Nueva had killed 8 people at the 7&7 Bar in Ciudad Juárez just a few weeks before the rehab center attack.

The attack was materialized within sight of the U.S.-Mexico border and is one of the worst single mass shootings in the history of Ciudad Juárez.

The Mexican authorities stated that the drug trafficking organizations use rehabilitation clinics to recruit foot soldiers and smugglers, and often kill those who do not cooperate. Others are killed for failing to pay for their drugs or for ripping off a dealer. In addition, the cartels frequently target unlicensed rehabilitation centers, since they are likely to accept active gang members seeking to free themselves from an addiction. Unlike the government-licensed clinics, the private centers are not associated with the penal system and have limited security measures, leaving the victims vulnerable to attacks by gangs seeking revenge or the elimination of a potential police informant. In Ciudad Juárez alone, there are around 100,000 drug addicts and many of the rehab clinics are unlicensed and ran by former addicts, making them easy points for the cartels to infiltrate. Some cartel members even check themselves in the facility and pose as addicts. Once they gain information of why the facility works, they co-opt with workers or threaten to kill them. Some of the addicts sell candy and gum at the city's stop lights to raise money for those struggling in their rehab center, but the cartels have taken this opportunity to force them to sell drugs too. The drug cartels have also created and managed pseudo-clinics, and once their patients are off drugs, they give them the choice to work as a drug trafficker or get killed. The cartels usually "dispose" of their young addicts by killing them, since the criminal organizations quickly recruit young men and prefer to minimize their risk by eliminating the others.

==== Decline of the Juárez Cartel ====
The decline of the Juárez Cartel began in 1997 after the death of Amado Carrillo Fuentes, but worsened in mid-2000 when the Sinaloa Cartel sought to take over the assets of the criminal organization and move into the city. In 2010, violence in Ciudad Juárez reached its peak, seeing an average of 10 homicides per day, or about 230 murders per 100,000 people annually. That same year, the average in all of Mexico was of 18 murders per 100,000 inhabitants. La Línea and the Juárez cartel lived their biggest blow with the arrest of José Antonio Acosta Hernández (a.k.a. El Diego), a top drug baron accused by the Mexican authorities of ordering more than 1,500 killings. Joaquín Guzmán Loera's four-year struggle in Ciudad Juárez left more than 10,000 since 2008, but evidence shows that the murder rates in Ciudad Juárez decreased by 59.8% in the first half of 2012 when compared to the same period in 2011, and Mexican officials have attributed this decline to the success of its law enforcement agencies. Nonetheless, experts told El Paso Times that part of the reason why the violence in Ciudad Juárez toned down is because the Sinaloa cartel has consolidated its dominance over the now-weakened Juárez cartel. The Juárez cartel continues to operate in the city, but it no longer holds a monopoly and appears to be unable to expand. Other experts echo that the cartel is having difficulties paying its members and that the violence will continue to decline as its hegemony erodes. Their relationship with the Barrio Chino gang has also been tampered by the cartel's decline. NPR reports indicated that several people in Ciudad Juárez, including but not limited to local journalists and former policemen, perceived that the Mexican government allegedly favored the Sinaloa cartel in their battle against the Juárez cartel. Nonetheless, counterarguments from security experts were also included.

The reported victory of the Sinaloa cartel may possibly not halt the forces of the Juárez cartel; as long as Vicente Carrillo Fuentes is alive and free, the warfare in the area will possibly continue. With limited options, the Juárez cartel has been forced to reorganize its forces and opt for extortions and kidnappings, while Gente Nueva – the Sinaloa cartel's armed wing – receives funding from other states. In addition, the drug corridor in Ciudad Juárez remains a crucial territory for the Mexican drug trafficking organizations, so the city could continue to see battles for the control of the lucrative smuggling routes – even at a diminishing scale. And although the rise of the New Juárez Cartel has yet to materialize, the threat still remains.

=== Cartel infighting in Acapulco ===
In mid-2011, the Mexican authorities said that hundreds of corpses found in several mass graves in the state of Durango were victims of infighting within the Sinaloa Cartel. Through a banner, Gente Nueva and Los Ms, a faction led by Ismael Zambada García, accused other lieutenants in the cartel of "heating up the plaza" in Durango by trying to attract law enforcement presence in the area, usually through indiscriminate killings and other violent tactics. The message warned their rivals that they had only 24 hours to leave the area before they were killed. The banner was followed by a pair of videos uploaded on March that showed several armed men in military grabs interrogating two men allegedly working for a rival faction. In the video, the two men said that they had been sent to Durango to disrupt cartel operatives. The dispute indicated that two leaders in Gente Nueva, Noel Salgeiro and Felipe Cabrera, had lost the support of the upper-leaders in Gente Nueva and the rest of the Sinaloa organization.

Initially, the massacre was overshadowed by the other mass graves in the northeastern state of Tamaulipas. But when Bernabé Monje Silva, alias M14 was arrested by the Federal police, he led them to the exact location of the bodies. He later confessed that there was a feud between several factions of the Sinaloa cartel for the control of the drug corridors in Acapulco. The area is a strategic drug trafficking corridor since it can connect with the border cities of Nuevo Laredo, Reynosa, and Ciudad Juárez. It is also an attractive pathway state and producer region, notorious for growing poppy and marijuana in the mountainous region known as the "Golden Triangle." In addition, according to Mexican and U.S. intelligence, Joaquín Guzmán Loera (El Chapo) has been reported to have married in a small town in Acapulco and lived in the Sierra Madre mountains in 2007 and 2009 respectively.

=== Veracruz incursion and massacre ===
The tit-for-tat fighting between Los Zetas and the Sinaloa cartel started in the Mexican state of Veracruz, a strategic smuggling region with a giant gulf port. On 20 September 2011 at around 5:00 pm, several vehicles blocked a major avenue in Boca del Río, Veracruz. Once traffic stopped, armed men abandoned two trucks in the middle of the highway. Then they opened the gates of the truck beds and left a written message behind. Other gunmen pointed their weapons at the frightened drivers. The cartel members then fled the scene.

The two trucks that were left at an underpass near a shopping mall contained 35 dead bodies. Consequently, the stunned motorists began to grab their cellphones and post messages on Twitter warning other drivers to avoid the area. When first discovered, all of the corpses were alleged to be members of Los Zetas, but it was later proven that only six of them had been involved in minor crime incidents, and none of them were involved with organized crime. Some of the victims had their hands tied and bore signs of torture. The message left behind stated the following:

"No more extortions or murders of innocent people! ... People of Veracruz, do not allow extortions; do not pay for protection ... This is going to happen to all the Zetas-fucks that continue to operate in Veracruz ... This territory has a new proprietor."

— G.N.

The banner's reference to "G.N." was a clear reference to Gente Nueva, but the Jalisco New Generation Cartel later assumed full responsibility for the massacre and the incursions in the state of Veracruz, traditionally considered turf of Los Zetas.

=== Present-day ===
The group suffered setbacks in 2013. Mario Nuñez Meza, also known as M-10 or El Mayito, was arrested in Ciudad Juarez. Months later they arrested his brother M-12 also in Juarez. On 11 December 2013, Gente Nueva squad leader, Jesús Gregorio Villanueva Rodríguez (alias "El R5") was shot and injured as he left a fast food restaurant in the state of Sonora, his area of operations. His girlfriend and he were taken to the hospital, but Villanueva Rodríguez died after receiving medical attention.

== Known leaders of Gente Nueva ==
Name	Alias	Status	Killed/Captured/Reward	Refs
Noel Salgueiro	El Flaco / El 6	Arrested	4 Oct. 2011	
Antonio Marrufo	El Jaguar	Arrested	3 Feb. 2012	
Marco Paredes Machado	El M100	Arrested	11 Jan. 2011	
Alfredo Salazar Ramirez	Justiciero/Muñeco /Señor/Mandamas/Misterioso/	Arrested	1 Nov. 2012	

== See also ==
- Manuel Torres Félix
- Sinaloa Cartel

== Bibliography ==
- Tuckman, Jo (2012). Mexico: Democracy Interrupted. Yale University Press. ISBN 978-0300160314.
