= 2023 Ciudad Juárez prison attack =

Mass murder in Chihuahua, Mexico

On 1 January 2023, a gang stormed a prison in Ciudad Juárez, Chihuahua, Mexico, resulting in the deaths of 19 people.

== Background ==
The Mexican drug war began in 2006. Ciudad Juárez is a large city in Chihuahua which is next to the United States border, opposite El Paso in Texas. Mexican drug cartels have carried out many attacks in Juárez, including a prison riot in March 2009, an attack on a rehab center in September 2009 and a massacre in January 2010. The Juárez Cartel carried out serial killings there.

== Attack ==
At 7 am on 1 January 2023, a gang arrived in several armored vehicles at the Cereso number 3 state prison in Juárez, where they opened fire on guards, while prisoners inside rioted. Ten guards, seven inmates, and two gunmen were killed, while 13 other people were wounded, and four were arrested. At least 30 inmates escaped, including the leader of the Los Mexicles gang, Ernesto Alfredo Piñón de la Cruz, who is believed to be behind a wave of killings in August 2022 known as "Black Thursday", in which 10 people were killed.

On 3 January, a shootout between gunmen and state investigators who were hunting the escapees resulted in five gunmen and two investigators being killed. Piñón de la Cruz was killed in a subsequent shootout with law enforcement in the early hours of 5 January.
