= Vicente Carrillo =

Vicente Carrillo may refer to:

- Vicente Carrillo Fuentes (born 1962), Mexican drug trafficker, leader of Juárez Cartel
- Vicente Carrillo Leyva (born 1976), Mexican drug trafficker, nephew of above
