= Navolato, Sinaloa =

City in the Mexican state of Sinaloa

- City
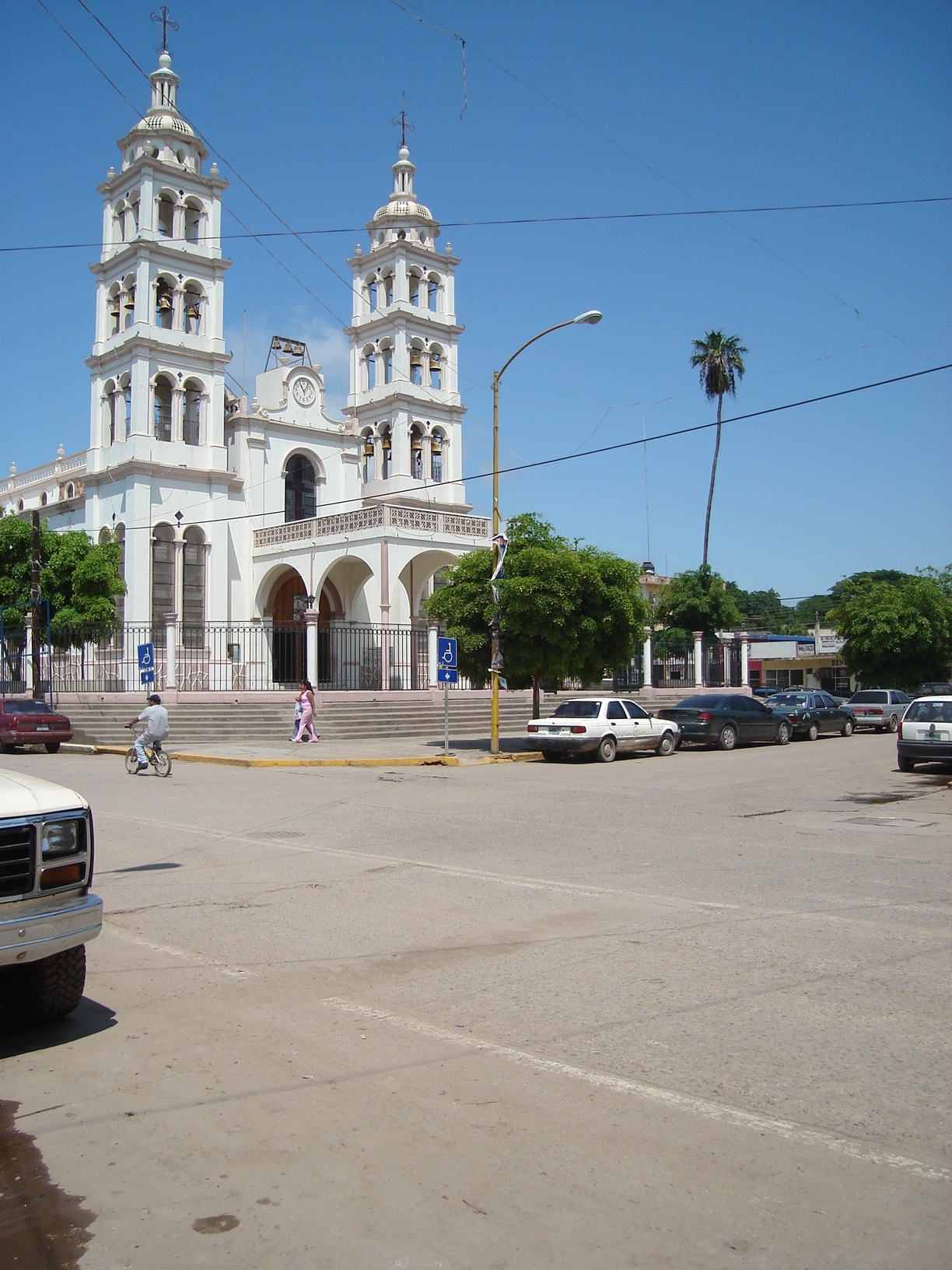
- Parroquia de San Francisco de Asís in Navolato

- Coat of arms

- Location in Sinaloa Navolato, Sinaloa (Mexico)
- Coordinates: 24°45′56″N 107°42′07″W
- Country: Mexico
- State: Sinaloa
- Municipality: Navolato

Population (2010)
  - Total: 28,676
- Time zone: UTC-7 (Pacific (US Mountain))
- Area code: 672

Navolato is a city in the Mexican state of Sinaloa. It is located in the central coastal part of the state bordering the Gulf of California and serves as the municipal seat for the surrounding municipality of the same name.

The municipality reported 135,603 inhabitants in the 2010 census, while the city reported 29,153 inhabitants. The city is located about 25 kilometers west of Culiacán and can be reached by road. The municipality is 2,285 km^{2} (882 sq mi) in area and includes many smaller communities in addition to the city of Navolato; the largest of these are the towns of Campo Gobierno, and General Ángel Flores (La Palma).

The name Navolato comes from the native Nahuatl language. The people in Navolato produce sugarcane, maize, and other agricultural products. Nearby tourist destinations are Altata, Nuevo Altata, and El Tambor.

== Culture ==
The music in the municipal of Navolato is developed through bandas or brass bands, trios, cuartetos, or other forms of musical expressions in which they use in order to sing to their land. According to Encyclopedia of the Municipals of Mexico Sinaloa, "They invited diverse artists to use their musical passions to sing to their people, and to all of their natural beauty that surrounds them." They had local composers and strangers sing beautiful songs for the state of Sinaloa, where Navolato is located in. Severiano Briseño Chávez composed the song "El Sinaloense" (The Sinaloen), which was one of the most greatest composed songs in Sinaloa, Navolato still to this day. Jose Angle Espinoza Ferrusquilla did a homage for his land with the song "En Sinaloa Naci"which means "Born in Sinaloa." In Navolato, Sinaloa, according to Portal Grupero, "The singer Valente Del Real was born in 1985. He started his musical career at the young age of eleven years. He has since pretained to various groups, where he learned to play various instruments. For instance the drums, the base and the guitar were his most played instruments. His voice is very similar to that of the disappeared Valentin Elizalde. He also usually does his performances with Banda Pueblo Lindo.

In the Altata Bay, there are many different types of marine species. The Encyclopedia of the Municipal of Mexico Sinaloa stated that," They catch shrimp, tuna, clams, oysters, scallops, and marlin." Not to mention, they also catch a large variety of sweet water fish. In this community of Navolato they enjoy a variety of different styles of fish based plates. This includes: meatballs made of fish, chile rellenos filled with crab, and their famous Sinaloa style shrimp Cevichi. Their favorite dessert is Jamoncillo which is "Dulce de leche."This dessert is made with the conserves and piloncillos derivatives of the grindings of sugar canes. However, their most famous dessert is the "tacuarines" which is a cookie made of corn, flour and water in the shape of circles other various forms.

== Demographics ==
Sinaloa Navolato lies along the coast of the Gulfo de California. It covers an area of 58,091 square kilometers (22,429 square miles), which is a slightly smaller than Norway. In Sinaloa Navolato, there are three types of landscape: a coastal plan in the west, mountains (sierras) in the east, and valleys between them. In the eastern part of the state Sierra Madre Occidental is known by different names. Valleys lie between the ranges of mountains and the coastal plan, where the land is flat with few hills. The rivers rise in the Sierra Madre Occidental and cross the state to flow into the Gulfo de California and the Pacific Ocean. Major rivers are the Fuerte and Sinaloa. Sinaloa had a total population of 2,536,844 in 2000; of the total, 1,264,143 were men and 1,272,701 were women, according to the Junior Worldmark Encyclopedia of the Mexican States. It also stated that, “The population density was 44 people per square kilometer (114 people per square mile).” Almost all citizens speak Spanish as their first language. A small number, about 2.2% of the population speaks indigenous (native) languages in Sinaloa Navolato. According to the Junior Worldmark Encyclopedia of the Mexican States, “77% of the population, or about two million people, were Roman Catholic; almost 3%, or 65,346 people, were Protestant.” That year there were also 32,783 Jehovah's witnesses and over 180,000 people who reported no religion. Sinaloa Navolato is not very well known by most people, but it is a rather unusual place to know and learn about. For example, the name Sinaloa comes from the Chaita language. It is a combination of the words sina, which means pithaya (a plant with thorny stalks), and lobola, which means rounded. The pithaya is a common plant throughout the region, which has great meaning.

== Geography ==
In Navolato according to the Junior Worldmark Encyclopedia of the Mexican States, "Along the coastal plains of Sinaloa it remains hot even after cold times.” Temperatures in the daytime can be up to 90 degrees and in winter times like around December, January, and February can be up to 80 degrees. Most of the rain fall occurs in July, August, and September along with cooling temperatures by the coast. This part of Sinaloa is mostly watched by the Environmental Protection Agency due tremendous climate change. In the Junior Worldmark Encyclopedia of the Mexican States it says, “That this part of Mexico has teamed up with U.S. and Alaska to form a group called the Western Hemisphere Shorebird Reserve Network.” The reason why it was named this is because of the Pacific Flyway Shorebirds that breed in Canada, Alaska, and other West Coastal regions of the United States. According to MagnaVerno, “Watering prior to harvest allows the basil to be cut/harvested three times.” Plants here can range from oaks to poplars to cieba and mangroves, which is an evergreen that usually grows along the coast. Fruit like lemons, peaches and pears are also known to be found as well. Animals that can be found in this area are: dears, wildcats, badgers, wild boar, coyotes and tlacuaches. However, fishing is another great part of Navolato, which holds second place national level terms of value of production, and third in fish and other seafood.

=== Climate ===
Climate data for Navolato (1951–2010)
Month	Jan	Feb	Mar	Apr	May	Jun	Jul	Aug	Sep	Oct	Nov	Dec	Year
Record high °C (°F)	39.5 (103.1)	39.5 (103.1)	37.5 (99.5)	41.5 (106.7)	42.0 (107.6)	43.0 (109.4)	44.0 (111.2)	42.0 (107.6)	43.0 (109.4)	42.0 (107.6)	42.0 (107.6)	37.0 (98.6)	44.0 (111.2)
Mean daily maximum °C (°F)	27.7 (81.9)	29.2 (84.6)	31.0 (87.8)	33.1 (91.6)	35.6 (96.1)	36.4 (97.5)	36.6 (97.9)	36.4 (97.5)	35.5 (95.9)	35.1 (95.2)	32.6 (90.7)	28.6 (83.5)	33.2 (91.8)
Daily mean °C (°F)	19.4 (66.9)	20.2 (68.4)	21.6 (70.9)	23.7 (74.7)	26.3 (79.3)	29.1 (84.4)	30.0 (86.0)	30.2 (86.4)	29.6 (85.3)	27.9 (82.2)	24.0 (75.2)	20.0 (68.0)	25.2 (77.4)
Mean daily minimum °C (°F)	11.1 (52.0)	11.1 (52.0)	12.2 (54.0)	14.2 (57.6)	17.0 (62.6)	21.7 (71.1)	23.4 (74.1)	24.0 (75.2)	23.8 (74.8)	20.8 (69.4)	15.3 (59.5)	11.4 (52.5)	17.2 (63.0)
Record low °C (°F)	4.0 (39.2)	−1.0 (30.2)	7.5 (45.5)	9.0 (48.2)	11.0 (51.8)	10.0 (50.0)	10.0 (50.0)	18.0 (64.4)	16.0 (60.8)	11.0 (51.8)	5.0 (41.0)	5.0 (41.0)	−1.0 (30.2)
Average precipitation mm (inches)	22.6 (0.89)	9.2 (0.36)	2.1 (0.08)	1.2 (0.05)	7.4 (0.29)	6.5 (0.26)	71.6 (2.82)	120.8 (4.76)	134.5 (5.30)	76.7 (3.02)	6.5 (0.26)	11.5 (0.45)	470.6 (18.53)
Average precipitation days (≥ 0.1 mm)	2.0	1.1	0.4	0.2	0.1	1.2	7.4	9.8	8.7	2.9	1.0	1.3	36.1
Source: Servicio Meteorologico Nacional

== Government ==
Navolato was part of the municipality of Culiacan until the year 1982 when it was constituted as a municipality. A decree was publicized in the official newspaper on August 27, constituting itself in a way as the eighteenth municipal of surrounding the community. There are a couple of historical monuments in Navolato according to the Encyclopedia of the Municipals of Mexico Sinaloa such as, "The Temple of San Francisco de Asis, which was built in 1950 and the Chapel of San Jose, which was built in 1927."

The judicial system is called the Tribunal of Justice, which is the highest court system in the state of Mexico. The Supreme Tribunal of justice has eleven members that are assigned for fifteen years with no reappointment. There is a required retirement age of 70 years. According to Explorando Mexico,"the state governor of Navolato office is assisted by the departments of director's of liaisons and events, public relations. The Governor's hearings are over seen by administrative and touring coordinators, as well private secretary and other auxiliary secretaries in charge of the Governor's agenda, among other federal dependencies and autonomous organizations".

== Economy ==
Resources are formed from a variety of products that are from harvest fields that grow wheat, bean, fruits, potatoes, zucchini and sugar cane. Navolato is the largest industry in the state that produces a large exporting capacity, which has become an integral part of the state. Infrastructure transports its food and vegetables from two important international airports, which are Mazatlan and Topolobampo. Harvest is transported from Navolato to difference parts of Mexico to supply their markets, as while as their income. Navolato also depends on local railroads to transport merchandise and other food produces. Navolato economy is slowly expanding and finding new ways to build their cities. For example, telecommunications and electricity generated throughout their cities. Navolato government and economy is maintaining their judicial system and keeping becoming more proficient.

Navolato is most known for its renowned agricultural industry. Because of the versatile location, Navolato produces an array of agricultural products. Navolato leads in the production of sugar cane, rice, vegetables, wheat, beans, and sea food. The fishing and horticulture is second following Navolato's natural resources, which are also leading asset to the nation income. “Agriculture and livestock account for about 21% of the economy". The list of agriculture and livestock is abundant due to the location. Many of the crops are produced through irrigation near sea level, which is what makes these crops such a high demand. “Its high productivity allows participation in international markets by exporting fruit and vegetable products which represents more than 60% of the total exports in Sinaloa". Navolatos agriculture is a prized business as well. “On a national level, it is among the first place in vegetables such a tomatoes, cucumber, pumpkins, potatoes, chilies, and eggplant, in fruits there are mangos, cantaloupes, and watermelon, and in grains, there corn, beans, soybeans, safflowers, rice, wheat, and sorgum". The second largest business would be the livestock and the breeding of livestock. By breeding livestock, Navolato farmers are able to succeed in the business of producing sausage, cheese, and milk among with other products made from livestock. They are known for the fishing industry because they are located right off the Pacific Ocean.

== Notable people ==
- Vicente Carrillo Fuentes (a.k.a. "El Viceroy"), suspected drug trafficker, younger brother of Amado Carrillo Fuentes, nephew of Ernesto Fonseca Carrillo and uncle of Vicente Carrillo Leyva
- Amado Carrillo Fuentes (a.k.a. "El Señor de los Cielos"), Mexican drug lord, one of the founders and the former head of Juárez Cartel, the older brother of Vicente Carrillo Fuentes, nephew of Ernesto Fonseca Carrillo and father of Vicente Carrillo Leyva
- José Manuel Amarillas Monjardín, regidor from Novolato, was murdered by an armed commando on May 11, 2017.
- Juan Luis Lagunas Rosales (a.k.a. "El Pirata De Culiacan"), a popular YouTuber and comedian who was murdered in 2017 in Zapopan, allegedly by the CJNG, because of comments he made about El Mencho on video
