= 2009 Ciudad Juárez prison riot =

Deadly riot in Chihuahua, Mexico

- Date: March 4, 2009
- Time: 7 a.m. MST (2 p.m. UTC)
- Location: Cerezo state prison, Ciudad Juárez, Chihuahua, Mexico; 31.6449°N 106.4620°W
- Cause: Gang rivalry
- Casualties: 20 dead, 15 injured

A prison riot occurred at the CERESO state prison in Ciudad Juárez, Chihuahua, Mexico, on March 4, 2009. During the riots, at least 20 people were killed and 15 were injured. Although a police spokesman stated that no police or jail guards were killed during the riots, the Red Cross said that two policemen had been killed. The riot was a fight among several rival gangs, the "Barrio Azteca", "Los Mexicles" and "Artistas Asesinos" (AA).

== Events ==
The riots began at roughly 7 AM local time (2 PM UTC), and lasted for about two hours. 14 members of the Aztecas "subjugated" a prison guard with knives and stole the guard's keys. The gang then opened several cells, releasing 170 prisoners. The prisoners forced their way into an area where members of the Mexicles and AA were meeting with family and friends during conjugal visits, and attacked them. During the riots, prisoners set blocks of prison cells on fire, stabbed each other with knives, or were beaten. Other prisoners used rifles and iron pins as weapons. In addition, some prisoners were thrown from the second story of buildings. Two of the 20 prisoners died at a local hospital, while the remainder died in the prison.

At least 50 members of the Mexican Army and 200 police were deployed to end the riots. An airplane and two helicopters were also used to quell the violence. Earlier in the day, 1,500 troops began entering the city in an effort to reduce drug-and-gang-related violence, which, over the last year, took the lives of 2,000 people in Ciudad Juárez.
