= La Línea (gang) =

Heavily armed unit of the Juárez Cartel

La Línea (New Juárez Cartel)
- Founding location: Ciudad Juárez, Mexico
- Years active: 2008–present
- Territory: Mexico: Chihuahua and Sonora; United States: New Mexico and Texas
- Leader: Juan Pablo Ledezma
- Activities: Drug trafficking, extortion, kidnapping, murder
- Allies: Juárez Cartel; Jalisco New Generation Cartel; Beltrán-Leyva Cartel; Los Zetas; Barrio Azteca
- Rivals: Sinaloa Cartel; Los Ántrax; Gente Nueva; Los Mexicles; Artistas Asesinos

La Línea ("The Line") is currently the leading faction of the Juárez Cartel originally designed to be one of the cartel's enforcer units set up by a number of former and active-duty policemen, heavily armed and extensively trained in urban warfare. Their corrupt "line" of policemen were set up to protect drug traffickers, but after forming an alliance with Barrio Azteca to fight off the forces of the Sinaloa Cartel in 2008, they established a foothold in Ciudad Juárez as the enforcement wing of the Juárez cartel. La Línea has also been involved in extortions and kidnappings. As of 2021, La Línea has formed an alliance with the Jalisco New Generation Cartel in Ciudad Juárez to fight off influence and incursions from the Sinaloa Cartel.

At the service of the Juárez cartel, La Línea has been instrumental in helping Vicente Carrillo Fuentes' organization hold influence in Ciudad Juárez, one of the most important crossings and drug corridors in the U.S-Mexico border and home to a growing retail drug market. In the early 2010s the DEA estimated that about 70% of the cocaine that enters the United States flows through the El Paso–Juárez border.

La Línea is linked to some of Ciudad Juárez's and the region's most notorious massacres, including the massacre of 16 teenagers at a high school party (Villas de Salvárcar massacre), the shooting that killed 19 patients at a rehab center, and of the cell phone-detonated car bomb attack – all of them perpetrated in 2010. The gang has also been connected to the infamous Mormon family massacre in Sonora in 2019. Their former gang leader, nicknamed El Diego, was guilty of carrying out more than 1,500 killings from 2008 to 2011 alone.

== History ==
=== Villas de Salvárcar massacre ===
Gunmen burst into a party in a small working-class neighborhood known as Villas de Salvárcar in Ciudad Juárez, killing 16 teenagers on January 31, 2010. Witnesses said that the cartel members arrived at the crime scene in seven cars with tinted windows, closed down the street and blocked the exits. Then they stormed the party and opened fire at the victims as they were watching a football (soccer) game. Some of the teenagers were shot as they tried to flee and their corpses were found in the neighboring houses. As neighbors hid in their houses, some dialed the emergency services but the Mexican military and the Federal police did not arrive until after the killers had left. When the Mexican authorities arrived, a large crowd gathered at the crime scene as the neighbors and family members of the victims, whose ages ranged from 15 to 20, cried and set down candles. They pleaded for their names not to be released for the fear of the hit men returning and taking revenge. The relatives and witnesses interviewed after the massacre insisted that the teenagers had nothing to do with the drug trade and were "good kids." What was troubling for the authorities was that the victims were not gathered inside a bar or at a rehab center, but rather at a private home. They gave no official statement for the motives behind the killing, but the massacre bore all the signs of the drug violence that Ciudad Juárez was living for the past three years. Videos from the crime scene depict a sparsely furnished home with large puddles of blood and taints smeared on the walls; in addition, more than 100 AK-47 bullet casings were found at the crime scene. The Mexican authorities issued a reward of $1 million pesos for anyone who could provide information that led to the arrest of the killers.

One by one, the coffins of the victims were carried out from their homes on February 4, 2010, as their families demanded for justice. The governor of the state of Chihuahua, José Reyes Baeza Terrazas, showed up at the funeral unexpectedly to pay his respects to the families. Felipe Calderón, Mexico's president, also visited the family members and handed a memorial plaque to the parents of the victims. The mayor of Ciudad Juárez said that the massacre was a random act of violence by Mexico's drug gangs because the victims had no apparent ties with organized crime. But Calderón was widely criticized for his initial comments after the massacre, where he claimed that the investigations had shown that those killed were almost certainly targeted for being involved in organized crime. The parents of the victims hung huge placards outside their houses accusing Calderón of failing to solve the massacre and explicitly saying that "until those responsible are found, [he was] the murderer." The federal government of Mexico responded to the massacre by implementing the "Todos Somos Juárez" program, which aimed to improve education and social development, create jobs, and improve the health benefits in Ciudad Juárez. It has fed up $400 million to repair the city's social fabric. Calderón has met with young people and representatives of the federal program to discuss and analyze the city's achievements. He also unveiled a billboard facing traffic in El Paso, Texas heading into Mexico that reads "No More Weapons," and criticized the United States for not renewing a ban on the sales of assault weapons that expired in 2004.

Four days after the massacre, a suspect identified as José Dolores Arroyo Chavarría was arrested by the Mexican military. He confessed to the authorities that the Juárez Cartel had received reports from within the organization that members of a rival drug trafficking organization were at the party the night the teenagers were killed. The suspect said he acted as a lookout for the 24 gunmen that perpetrated the killing and had orders to "kill everyone inside." By mid-2011, four men linked to the massacre were found guilty of the killings and were sentenced to 240 years each by the state of Chihuahua. In 2012 it was later confirmed by the Mexican authorities that the massacre was ordered by José Antonio Acosta Hernández (El Diego), a former drug baron of La Línea that is now imprisoned. A gang leader of the Barrio Azteca also admitted to having ordered the massacre because he thought rival gang members were there. Despite the arrests, many of the family members were unhappy with the efforts of the Mexican government and said that they were planning to abandon Mexico and seek safe haven in Texas to protect their children. "I never even gave the United States much thought," said one of the family members, "But Mexico has abandoned us, betrayed us."

=== Chihuahua rehab center shooting ===
Dozens of armed men with AR-15 and AK-47 rifles arrived in six vehicles at the Life and Faith facility, a church-run rehabilitation clinic in Chihuahua city at around 11:00 p.m. on June 10, 2010. The gunmen, outfitted with protective gear and ski masks, first claimed to be policemen, and herded the patients outside the clinic. Once they had lined up twenty-three of them outside execution-style, the gunmen opened fire at them, killing 19 and wounding four. The Mexican authorities found more than 200 bullet casings from different kinds of firearms at the scene. According to the pastor, some of the men in the facility were former gang members of Los Mexicles, who fight along with Artistas Asesinos and the Sinaloa Cartel for the control of the smuggling routes in the state. Most of the victims' ages ranged from 23 to 65, and included a blind man and a sixteen-year-old. According to the investigations, the perpetrators left behind four written cardboards, but the authorities did not release the content of the messages. The three-story facility housed addicts for 90 days, although some of the victims had more than a year or two in rehabilitation.

By June 2011, a leader of La Línea admitted planning and coordinating the attack against the drug facility.

The Mexican authorities stated that the drug trafficking organizations use rehabilitation clinics to recruit foot soldiers and smugglers, and often kill those who do not cooperate. Others are killed for failing to pay for their drugs or for ripping off a dealer. In addition, the cartels frequently target unlicensed rehabilitation centers, since they are likely to accept active gang members seeking to free themselves from an addiction. Unlike the government-licensed clinics, the private centers are not associated with the penal system and have limited security measures, leaving the victims vulnerable to attacks by gangs seeking revenge or the elimination of a potential police informant. In Ciudad Juárez alone, there are around 100,000 drug addicts and many of the rehab clinics are unlicensed and ran by former addicts, making them easy points for the cartels to infiltrate. Some cartel members even check themselves in the facility and pose as addicts. Once they gain information of how the facility works, they co-opt the workers or threaten to kill them. Some of the addicts sell candy and gum at the city's stop lights to raise money for those struggling in their rehab center, but the cartels have taken this opportunity to force them to sell drugs too. The drug cartels have also created and managed pseudo-clinics, and once their patients are off drugs, they give them two choices: to work as a drug trafficker or get killed. The cartels usually "dispose" of their young addicts by killing them, since the criminal organizations quickly recruit young men and prefer to minimize their risk by eliminating the others.

=== Ciudad Juárez car bomb attack ===
A car bomb attack was registered on June 16, 2010, in the border city of Ciudad Juárez, when members of La Línea triggered 10 kg (22 lb) of C-4 explosives with a cellphone, marking it as the first successful car bomb attack ever registered in the Mexican drug war. Before the detonation, the cartel members had dumped an injured man dressed in police uniform on the sidewalk to lure the Mexican authorities and paramedics closer to the vehicle. The authorities were notified by an emergency call that a man was allegedly executed, a lure tactic to bring them to where the bomb was planted. As a policeman and a paramedic rushed to the scene, the bomb detonated, killing them instantly. The injured man, who was not a police officer, and an innocent civilian, were also killed. A cameraman who was near the scene was gravely injured but manage to film the explosion aftermath.

The attack sent "shock waves" across Mexico and raised concerns in the United States, and represented what the authorities considered a "new dimension of terror" and a clear escalation in the weapons and tactics deployed by Mexico's drug trafficking organizations. TV images, aired on national television, showed a vehicle with only one intact wheel and two Federal Police on fire in the city's downtown area; U.S. authorities responded to the attacks with worry and noted that it was reminiscent of Colombia in the 1990s, and similar to the terrorism and warfare tactics the United States military was "running into in Iraq and Afghanistan." The Mexican peso depreciated after the attack, and economists warned that further car bomb attacks could damage Mexico's financial market and scare off investors. The Ciudad Juárez attack was the latest in a spate of car bombings, by the Mexican drug cartels, that were labelled by many news outlets as acts of "narcoterrorism". This label was vehemently denied by the Mexican government and many establishment figures such as Attorney General Arturo Chávez Chávez, they said that as these bombings only targeted members of the security forces they could not be considered terrorism. Others argue that the Mexican government simply sought to avoid the label to reduce the risk of the USA listing Mexican drug cartels as proscribed terrorist organisations; the label remains unclear.

A message left at the scene claimed that La Línea were responsible for the blast, and threatened further attacks:

"We still have car bombs ... [and this will] continue to happen to authorities that carry on supporting El Chapo ... FBI and DEA. Go and investigate authorities that are giving support to the Sinaloa Cartel."

=== Horizontes del Sur massacre ===
During a boy's birthday party at the Horizontes del Sur neighborhood in Ciudad Juárez, Chihuahua, several gunmen broke into a house and killed 14 people and wounded more than twenty on October 23, 2010. After firing more than 70 bullets, the attackers fled the scene in three different cars at around 11:00 pm. According to the witnesses' descriptions, the attackers were teenagers who had secured the area by blocking traffic. The Mexican police declined to comment if the killing was drug-related, but Felipe Calderón's response was remarkably different than the Villas de Salvárcar massacre, where he claimed that the massacre was most likely due to internal adjustments between the cartels. The killing in Horizontes del Sur bore striking similarities with the massacre in the Villas de Salvárcar neighborhood earlier that same year, which took place just a mile away and where 15 were gunned down at a party too.

The Mexican authorities concluded that there were two possible explanations for the massacre: Either La Línea and Los Aztecas were responsible for the killings; or "independent gunmen" paid to kill a person nicknamed El Ratón, an alleged member of Artistas Asesinos.

=== Rise of the New Juárez cartel ===
Through 10 "narcomantas" found throughout Ciudad Juárez on January 25, 2011, a criminal group known as the New Juárez Cartel (NJC) herald its existence. In the written banners, the NJC threaten the police chief of the city, Julián Leyzaola, calling him a criminal with a police badge. One of the messages promised that the NJC was planning to "kill a policeman a day" until Leyzaola discontinued his alleged support for the Sinaloa Cartel. Little was known of the NJC besides a video they uploaded online in September 2011, where they interrogated a prison guard they claimed was working for the Sinaloa cartel (his body was later found dead). And in October of that same year, a message by the NJC was left along a dismembered body. Stratfor believes that the NJC is a re-branding of the "old" Juárez Cartel, La Línea, and possibly other groups opposing the Sinaloa's encroachment. But it is unclear whether the NJC is composed solely of former members of La Línea and elements of the Juarez cartel or of numerous gangs that have aligned, even temporarily, to expropriate the Sinaloa cartel from Ciudad Juárez. La Línea, however, undertook an offensive against the local police in 2010, citing the same reasons that the NJC claims: it perceived that the police forces were favoring Joaquín Guzmán Loera (a.k.a. El Chapo).

In response to the death threats of the NJC, the mayor of Ciudad Juárez allowed off-duty policemen to carry their weapons, given that most of the local policemen killed in the city were targeted at home or on their way to work, and encourage them to live in hotels.

Such reorganizations like the NJC are common in Mexico's drug war, but they have often led to the further spread of violence. For instance, after the arrest of many of the leaders of the Beltrán-Leyva Cartel, the organization broke apart into smaller factions: the South Pacific Cartel, La Mano Con Ojos, and other regional gangs. And while none of these gangs have the near power of its original group, they have triggered fights in several states across Mexico. In other cases, however, reorganizations are not as severe; when La Familia Michoacana splintered into the Knights Templar Cartel, the impact was mild. The decline of Vicente Carrillo Fuentes's influence suggests that the failure of the local groups has much to do with a leadership decline. Hence, the impact of the NJC depends on whether they can reconstitute a force capable of fighting the Sinaloa cartel for a lengthy time, but thus far, the NJC does not pose as a direct threat to the Sinaloa establishment and for a reopening of a new fight for Ciudad Juárez.

==== Alliance with Los Zetas ====
Through graffiti signs in the state of Chihuahua in June 2011, La Línea announced that it had formed an alliance with Los Zetas, a criminal group originally formed by ex-commandos of the Mexican Army Special Forces, and threaten the Sinaloa cartel operatives. On the other hand, Sinaloa cartel formed an alliance with the Gulf Cartel, the former employers of Los Zetas, and with the now-extinct La Familia Michoacana, forming the so-called "New Federation." During that time, Los Zetas already had an alliance with the Sinaloa's former associates, Beltrán-Leyva Cartel, an extinct organization that had possibly trained the soldiers of La Línea for months or even years, according to Mexican intelligence.

With the alliance, Los Zetas may offer soldiers and training to La Línea in return for access to Ciudad Juárez and its smuggling routes.

==== Decline of the organization ====
The decline of the Juárez Cartel began in 1997 after the death of Amado Carrillo Fuentes, but accelerated in mid-2000 when the Sinaloa Cartel sought to take over the assets of the criminal organization and move into the city. In 2010, violence in Ciudad Juárez reached its peak, seeing an average of 10 homicides per day, or about 230 murders per 100,000 people annually. That same year, the average in all of Mexico was of 18 murders per every 100,000 inhabitants. La Línea and the Juárez Cartel were damaged by the arrest of José Antonio Acosta Hernández (a.k.a. El Diego), a top drug baron accused by the Mexican authorities of ordering more than 1,500 killings. Joaquín Guzmán Loera's four-year struggle in Ciudad Juárez left more than 10,000 dead since 2008, but evidence shows that the murder rates in Ciudad Juárez decreased by 59.8% in the first half of 2012 when compared to the same period in 2011, and Mexican officials attributed this decline to the success of its law enforcement agencies. Nonetheless, experts told El Paso Times that part of the reason why the violence in Ciudad Juárez toned down is because the Sinaloa cartel has consolidated its dominance over the now-weakened Juárez cartel. The Juárez cartel continues to operate in the city, but it no longer holds a monopoly and appears to be unable to expand. Other experts echo that the cartel is having difficulties paying its members and that the violence will continue to decline as its hegemony erodes. Their relationship with the Barrio Azteca gang has also been affected by the cartel's decline. NPR reports indicated that several people in Ciudad Juárez, including but not limited to local journalists and former policemen, perceived that the Mexican government allegedly favored the Sinaloa cartel in their battle against the Juárez cartel. Nonetheless, counterarguments from security experts were also included.

The reported victory of the Sinaloa Cartel may possibly not halt the forces of the Juárez cartel; as long as Vicente Carrillo Fuentes is alive and free, the warfare in the area will possibly continue. With limited options, the Juárez cartel has been forced to reorganize its forces and opt for extortions and kidnappings, while Gente Nueva – the Sinaloa cartel's armed wing – receives funding from other states. In addition, the drug corridor in Ciudad Juárez remains a crucial territory for the Mexican drug trafficking organizations, so the city could continue to see battles for the control of the lucrative smuggling routes – even at a diminishing scale. And although the rise of the New Juárez Cartel has yet to materialize, the threat still remains. On May 17, 2018, a spokesperson for the Mexican federal police announced that the group's leader Carlos Arturo Quintana, who is known as "El 80," was captured in the town of Namiquipa in western Chihuahua and that no shots were fired when doing so.

In January 2020, La Linea leader Luis Antonio N. was arrested for murders of two Mexican National Guardsmen In February 2020, another La Linea member was arrested in the El Paso region. On May 25, 2020, La Linea lieutenant Gibran R.S., also known as "El Mocho, along with his wife Daniela and two alleged henchmen were arrested in Jimenez. Also identified as Luis Alberto M., he was also reported as the "leader" of La Linea and was believed to be responsible for recent incidents which saw 20 police sent to the hospital since May 20, 2020 after being shot at. The next day, however, it reported that local cops were still being targeted by gunfire, and that the arrest sparked an attack on the state police barracks. El Mocho's brother Fernando and two La Linea members identified as “El Canguro" and "El Torres" are believed to have assisted El Mocho in the group's illegal activities. However, the new La Empresa cartel leader, identified as "The Gnome," was later believed to have continued the attacks against local police, which resulted in the deaths of nine attackers and two police policers by May 29, and that there continuation was actually triggered by the recent arrests of previous La Empresa leader Jose Dolores Villegas Soto, a.k.a. "El Iraki," or "The Iraqi," and other prominent La Empresa members only identified by the nicknames "Uncle" and "Goofy". El Mocho was believed to have become La Linea's actual leader following the arrest and imprisonment of his predecessor Ricardo Arturo "El Piporro" C.

== Known leaders of La Línea ==
Name	Alias	Status	Killed/Captured/Reward	Refs	Photo
Damian Aguilera Arellano	Nini 19	Fugitive	November 21, 2014		
Juan Pablo Ledezma	El JL	Fugitive	$2M		
Juan Pablo Guijarro	El Mónico	Arrested	January 3, 2010		
Luis Carlos Vázquez Barragán	El 20	Arrested	July 26, 2010		
Marco Antonio Guzmán	Brad Pitt	Arrested	June 17, 2011		
José Guadalupe Rivas González	El Zucaritas	Arrested	June 18, 2011		
José Antonio Acosta Hernández	El Diego	Arrested	July 29, 2011		
Jesús Antonio Rincón Chavero	El Tarzán	Arrested	August 18, 2011		
Luis Guillermo Castillo Rubio	El Pariente	Arrested	April 20, 2012		

== See also ==
- Mexican drug war
- Mérida Initiative
- War on drugs
- LeBarón and Langford families massacre

== Bibliography ==
- Langton, Jerry (2011). Gangland: The Rise of the Mexican Drug Cartels from El Paso to Vancouver. John Wiley & Sons. ISBN 978-1118014271.
