= Julián Leyzaola =

Mexican police officer

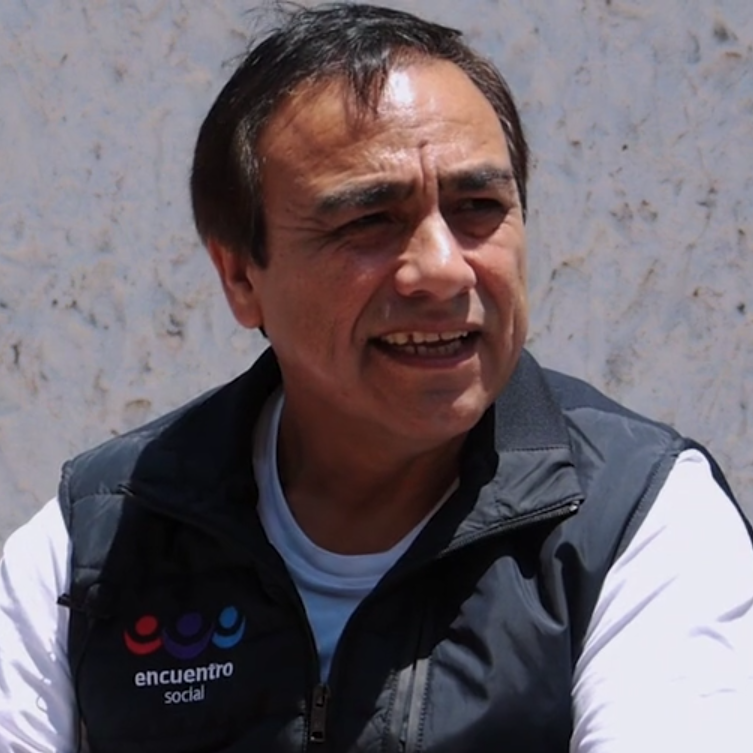
Leyzaola in 2018

Julián Leyzaola Pérez (born 27 February 1960) is a former Mexican military officer and former police chief and public safety secretary of Ciudad Juárez, Mexico. He became the new top cop in Ciudad Juárez after serving as the state police chief of Baja California, and is "credited with cleaning up Tijuana" from the drug violence. In the border city of Tijuana, Leyzaola launched "a crackdown on organized crime and police corruption," resulting in multiple assassination plots by the cartels. His law enforcement achievements cost him dearly as he was shot and paralyzed while returning from a trip in Mexico.

== Career in Tijuana ==
Born in Culiacán, Sinaloa, Leyzaola was appointed as the police chief of Tijuana on 10 December 2008, a city that was plagued with drug violence and base of the Tijuana Cartel. He replaced Jesús Alberto Capella Ibarra and as top cop, he fought to dismantle the corruption inside the police forces, and appointed military commanders and added new patrol cars to his security strategy. In fact, Leyzaola mentioned that he rejected a "$80,000-a-week offer" from the Sinaloa Cartel drug kingpin Joaquín Guzmán Loera, better known as El Chapo, who wanted to make a deal with him.

Leyzaola ran for mayor of Tijuana during the elections that took place on 2 June 2019. But Leyzaola, who represented the leftist Party of the Democratic Revolution (PRD) could not compete with Gonzalez and his large coalition of parties. is running for mayor of Tijuana.

== Work at Juárez ==
Just 48 hours after taking office, Leyzaola received a death threat by the drug cartels in Ciudad Juárez. And as of 2012, the Juárez Cartel, who fights for the control of the El Paso–Juárez drug corridor with the Sinaloa Cartel, threaten Leyzaola and promised to "kill a policeman a day."

== See also ==
- Mexican drug war
- Juárez Cartel
- La Línea
- Sinaloa Cartel
