= Villas de Salvárcar massacre =

Massacre in Mexico

The Villas de Salvárcar massacre occurred in Villas de Salvárcar, Ciudad Juárez, Mexico, on January 31, 2010, early in the morning, when gunmen attacked a birthday party attended by high school and university students. 16 people were killed.

Alejandro Martínez-Cabrera of the El Paso Times stated that the event "brought attention to the city's social problems" and "caused outrage in Mexico because of the brutality.". People outside Mexico also expressed outrage about the crime. As a result, the federal government started the program "Todos Somos Juárez" (We are Juárez) to rejuvenate the city, and President of Mexico Felipe Calderón took additional measures against drug cartels. Lorena Figueroa of the El Paso Times stated that due to the "brutality" of the crime, "the massacre gave notoriety" to Villas de Salvárcar.

== Event ==
A birthday party for Jesús Enríquez, who had turned 18, began on the evening of January 30, 2010 in a residence on Villa del Portal Street in Villas de Salvárcar, southeastern Ciudad Juárez. Those in attendance were high school and university students. 60 persons were inside the house. Around midnight, a group of 20 La Línea hitmen entered the residence and attacked the party guests. Immediately 14 of the persons were killed and 12 received injuries.

Witnesses said that the cartel members arrived at the crime scene in seven cars with tinted windows, closed down the street and blocked the exits. Then they stormed the party and opened fire at the victims as they were watching a soccer game. Some of the teenagers were shot as they tried to flee and their corpses were found in the neighboring houses. As neighbors hid in their houses, some dialed the emergency services but the Mexican military and the Federal police did not arrive until after the killers had left. When the Mexican authorities arrived, a large crowd gathered at the crime scene as the neighbors and family members of the victims, whose ages ranged from 15 to 20, cried and set down candles. They pleaded for their names not to be released for the fear of the hit men returning and taking revenge. What was troubling for the authorities was that the victims were not gathered inside a bar or at a rehab center, but rather at a private home. They gave no official statement for the motives behind the killing, but the massacre bore all the signs of the drug violence that Ciudad Juárez was living for the past three years. Videos from the crime scene depict a sparsely furnished home with large puddles of blood and taints smeared on the walls; in addition, more than 100 AK-47 bullet casings were found at the crime scene.

Of the deceased, one attended the Autonomous University of Chihuahua while the others were students at Plantel 9 del Colegio de Bachilleres and the Centro de Estudios de Bachillerato Técnico Industrial y de Servicios (CBTIS). The relatives and witnesses interviewed after the massacre insisted that the teenagers had nothing to do with the drug trade and were "good kids." The mayor of Ciudad Juárez said that the massacre was a random act of violence by Mexico's drug gangs because the victims had no apparent ties with organized crime.

== Funeral and memorials ==
One by one, the coffins of the victims were carried out from their homes on February 4, 2010, as their families demanded for justice. The governor of the state of Chihuahua, José Reyes Baeza Terrazas, showed up at the funeral unexpectedly to pay his respects to the families. Felipe Calderón, Mexico's president, also visited the family members and handed a memorial plaque to the parents of the victims.

== Legal response ==
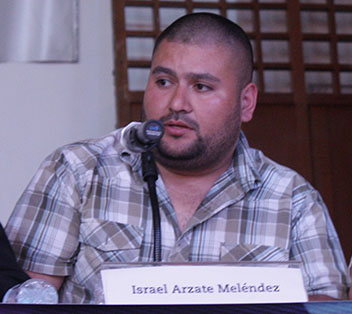
Israel Arzate Meléndez was tortured into falsely confessing to the crime.

The Mexican authorities issued a reward of $1 million pesos for anyone who could provide information that led to the arrest of the killers.

Four days after the massacre, a suspect identified as José Dolores Arroyo Chavarría was arrested by the Mexican military. He confessed to the authorities that the Juárez Cartel had received reports from within the organization that members of a rival drug trafficking organization were at the party the night the teenagers were killed. The suspect said he acted as a lookout for the 24 gunmen that perpetrated the killing and had orders to "kill everyone inside."

In 2012 it was later confirmed by the Mexican authorities that the massacre was ordered by José Antonio Acosta Hernández (El Diego), a former drug baron of La Línea that is now imprisoned. A gang leader of the Barrio Azteca also admitted to having ordered the massacre because he thought rival gang members were there.

On Sunday March 14, 2010, Mexican authorities arrested the accused lookout, Heriberto Martinez. By March 21 of that year, the Mexican military arrested four more individuals.

Israel Arzate Meléndez was arrested on February 3 and received torture until he falsely confessed involvement.

José Dolores Arroyo Chavarría, Aldo Favio Hernández, Heriberto Martínez, and Juan Alfredo Soto Arias were convicted of the murders in July 2011. They were sentenced to 240 years each by the state of Chihuahua.

On March 15, 2012, Javier Hernández Valencia, the Representative in Mexico of the United Nations High Commissioner for Human Rights, visited Arzate Meléndez in prison and stated he had been tortured. Hernández subsequently supported the human rights Mexican NGO "Miguel Agustín Pro Juárez Human Rights Center A.C." (Center Prodh) in their advocacy efforts for Arzate’s release and to bring public attention to his case. On November 6, 2013, the Supreme Court of Mexico First Chamber ordered the release of Arzate Meléndez, who had been kept in pretrial isolation until that point. The ruling was greeted by the U.N. Human Rights Office.

Despite the arrests, many of the family members were unhappy with the efforts of the Mexican government and said that they were planning to abandon Mexico and seek safe haven in Texas to protect their children. "I never even gave the United States much thought," said one of the family members, "But Mexico has abandoned us, betrayed us."

== Aftermath ==
While on a trip to Japan, President of Mexico Felipe Calderón stated that the victims were gang members. He later retracted that claim after criticism from the victims' families. Calderón was widely criticized for his initial comments after the massacre. The parents of the victims hung huge placards outside their houses accusing Calderón of failing to solve the massacre and explicitly saying that "until those responsible are found, [he was] the murderer."

The federal government of Mexico responded to the massacre by implementing the "Todos Somos Juárez" program, which aimed to improve education and social development, create jobs, and improve the health benefits in Ciudad Juárez. It has fed up $400 million to repair the city's social fabric. Calderón has met with young people and representatives of the federal program to discuss and analyze the city's achievements. He also unveiled a billboard facing traffic in El Paso, Texas heading into Mexico that reads "No More Weapons," and criticized the United States for not renewing a ban on the sales of assault weapons that expired in 2004.

In 2012, Univision revealed that the guns used in the killings originated from Operation Fast and Furious.
