= LeBarón and Langford families massacre =

Massacre of Mexican-Americans in LaMora, Sonora, Mexico

Langford, Miller-LeBarón and Johnson families massacre
- Part of Mexican drug war
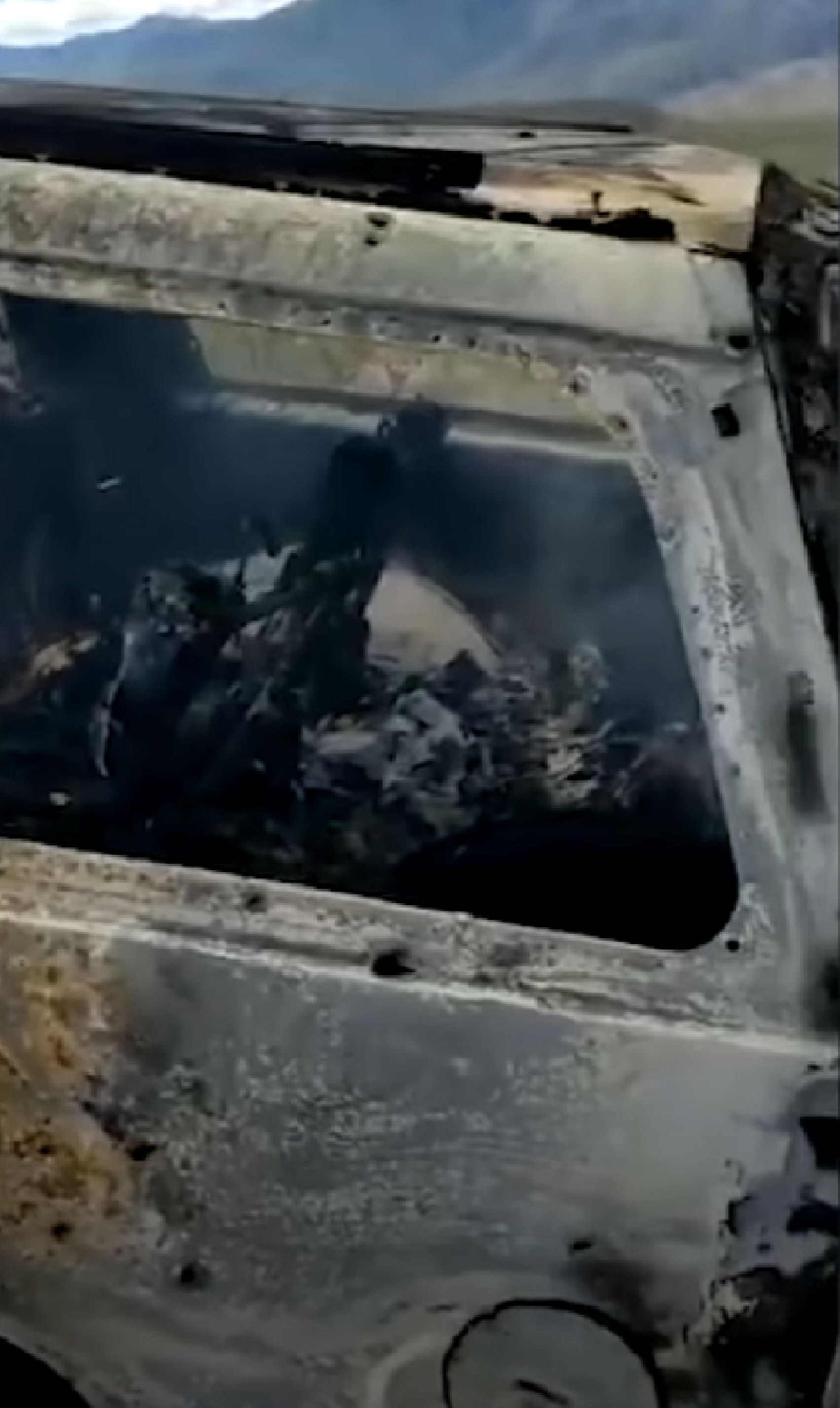
- Burnt vehicle that was carrying five members of the family
- Location: La Mora, Bavispe Municipality, Sonora, Mexico
- Date: November 4, 2019; 7 years ago
- Attack type: Mass shooting, arson
- Weapon: Firearms
- Deaths: 9
- Injuries: 6
- Perpetrator: La Línea

On November 4, 2019, about 70 miles (110 km) south of the Mexico–United States border, gunmen opened fire on a three-car convoy en route to a wedding carrying residents of the isolated La Mora community, which is predominantly composed of American-Mexican "independent Mormons." Nine people—three women and six children, all of whom held dual US–Mexican citizenship—were killed, with some burned alive in a car. A drug cartel is believed to be behind the attack. In January 2025, a federal judge in Almoloya de Juárez ordered the Attorney General's Office to investigate the massacre as an act of terrorism in Mexico. The attack was perpetrated by La Línea, which had been warring with the rival Los Salazar over control of smuggling routes.

== Background ==
=== Rancho La Mora ===
Some of Rancho La Mora families' ancestors include forebears surnamed Johnson who helped to settle Colonia Oaxaca (now "Rancho Oaxaca"), in the Bavispe Municipality, Sonora, Mexico), part of the historical Mormon colonies, in 1892. Rancho La Mora (also in the Bavispe Municipality) was founded by Langford family members immigrating there from other Sonoran Latter-day Saint colonias in the 1930s. Its proportion of fundamentalist Latter Day Saints swelled when some new residents left previous homes in Arizona after the 1953 "Short Creek raid". As of 2019, rancho La Mora, Sonora, contained 30 to 40 homes on about a thousand acres, and with a full-time population of about 150 people. The victims were all from this rancho, also having intermarriage ties with the factions of the Church of the Firstborn (headquartered in Colonia Le Barón, Chihuahua), despite the fact that the Mormon beliefs of the dominant religion in the LeBarón community differs, especially with regard to its professed chain of ecclesiastical authority, with those of the independent Mormons dominant in the La Mora community. The LeBarón family's enclave in state of Chihuahua was founded by Alma LeBaron, who moved there in the 1920s. Among the hundreds of dual-national and bilingual residents within the pair of sibling communities are independent fundamentalist Mormons, members of the Church of the Firstborn, and members of the mainstream Latter-day Saints. In addition, perhaps a few thousand individuals remain aligned with these religious communities who reside in various places within the United States.

=== Narco smuggling routes ===
Reportedly, the La Mora community had achieved a type of understanding with the area's currently dominant outlaw band, Los Salazar (Sinaloa Cartel), who have enjoyed some history of influence with Mexico's federal government. In months leading up to the attack, Sinaloa instructed residents to refrain from buying fuel across state lines in Chihuahua. Newly arrived enforcers who were unfamiliar to area residents and now manned the smuggling route's usual checkpoints occasionally pointed weapons at residents using the road. Transpiring immediately preceding the massacre was a shootout between Los Salazar and rival drug-route enforcers La Línea, said to have been formed originally by municipal peace officers from Ciudad Juárez, who are dominant in Chihuahua and were an outgrowth of the Juárez Cartel, and which has been warring with Sinaloa over control of the smuggling routes toward San Diego. (According to the BBC's Will Grant, one possible explanation for the atrocity is that "La Línea were targeting the Mormons...for having a relationship with their rivals, Los Salazar..." A senior Mexican general told The Wall Street Journal he believed La Linea sent gunmen to curtail Los Salazar infiltration into Chihuahua and not with the intent to victimize the settlement's members.)

== Incident ==
In a pair of attacks, gunmen opened fire on three SUVs, first upon a Chevrolet Tahoe and subsequently two Chevy Suburbans that were carrying American-Mexican independent fundamentalist Mormons of the extended LeBarón family, en route the paved highway near Galeana, Chihuahua (after which Christina Langford planned to drive her vehicle northward into the US and Rhonita Miller-LeBarón and Dawna Langford planned to continue southward to the community of Le Barón for rendezvous with family and a wedding), from their hometown of La Mora, Bavispe, Sonora, about 70 miles (110 km) south of the Mexico–United States border. According to Alfonso Durazo, the federal secretary for security, the location of the attack was in the municipality of Bavispe. The first vehicle reportedly left carrying Rhonita Miller-LeBarón and her four children close to 10 a.m. The other two vehicles left around 11 a.m., with one being driven by Dawna Ray Langford with nine children as passengers and the other driven by Christina Marie Langford with her seven-month-old daughter as a passenger.

The gunman reportedly killed Christina Langford after she jumped out of her vehicle and waved her hands to display she was not a threat. She was discovered 15 yards from her vehicle with her seven-month-old baby uninjured in the vehicle. Phone messages between family members showed the progression of discovering the incident. One message stated that one of the cars was on fire with bullets throughout it, and that people were hiding in the bushes. The burned-out vehicle was discovered to hold the bodies of Miller-LeBarón, her ten-year-old daughter, twelve-year-old son and infant twins, eleven miles from where the other two women were killed. The vehicle reportedly had broken down due to a flat tire, and was caused to explode by the number of bullets fired into the vehicle.

Two children, a 13-year-old boy and a nine-year-old girl, walked away from the scene to get help from relatives, the boy walking fourteen miles over six hours before arriving at the family compound. Prior to leaving, he covered his six surviving siblings in branches after hiding them in bushes. After becoming concerned that the boy had not returned close to nightfall, the girl began to walk herself in an effort to find help, walking for six hours.

Search efforts for the survivors began between 6 and 7 p.m., with the surviving children being discovered at 8:30 p.m., except for the children who walked for help. The last surviving child, the girl who went for help, was discovered at 9:45 p.m. Relatives stated that the girl had taken the wrong road and was tracked by her footprints. When she was found, she told them, "We have to go back. We have to go back. My siblings, my brothers and sisters are dying. They're bleeding, they're shot. We have to go rescue them."

== Victims and survivors ==
Nine people were killed: three women and six children, all of whom held dual US–Mexican citizenship. The victims of the attack were:

- Titus Miller, 8-month-old twin
- Tiana Miller, 8-month-old twin
- Rogan Langford, 2
- Krystal Miller, 10
- Trevor Langford, 11
- Howard Miller, 12
- Christina Langford, 29
- Maria Rhonita Miller (née LeBarón), 30
- Dawna Ray Langford, 43

Of the eight vehicle passengers, six were children. Five children who were wounded were flown to an Arizona hospital. Three others were uninjured and returned to family members. All survivors' injuries were caused by gunfire, not from fire or escaping the vehicles.

== Aftermath ==
Family members visited the scene of the massacre, escorted by members of the Mexican Army. The deceased were buried in La Mora and Colonia LeBarón with funerals beginning on November 7. The funerals were attended by hundreds of individuals, with some reportedly traveling from as far as North Dakota to attend.

== Investigation ==
Mexican officials announced at a news conference that the believed reason for the attack was that the family was believed to be a cartel convoy of vehicles. Prior in the day the area of the massacre had also been the scene of a shootout between rival cartel gangs. According to The Dallas Morning News's Alfredo Corchado, targeting of the victims may have been due to activism by certain extended LeBarón family members having "over the years been outspoken in their condemnation of criminal groups that hold sway over a wide swath of northern Mexico".

On November 5, Mexican authorities announced the arrest of a suspect in relation to the massacre, but reported the next day that the suspect was not involved. However, some authorities in Mexico have claimed that the massacre was perpetrated by the newly formed Los Jaguares cartel, an offshoot of the Sinaloa drug cartel. Following the murders, Mexican Foreign Affairs Secretary Marcelo Ebrard said Mexico invited participation by the US Federal Bureau of Investigation, his saying, "Why did we take that initiative? Because it involves U.S. citizens, and there was no reason not to allow the FBI to have access to the investigations, which we have requested in other cases," his referencing the 2019 El Paso shooting. About two dozen FBI agents arrived in La Mora; an FBI statement described the agency's aim as working "alongside our international partners to help bring justice to the perpetrators of this heinous act of violence."

On November 19, Mexican President Andrés Manuel López Obrador said, referencing Mexico's history of systemic corruption, "We're not protecting anyone. Mexico isn't the principal human rights violator now, like it was before. There's no impunity anymore." Addressing the investigation, López Obrador said, "There is information already, but I can't provide that," although offering to meet with the victims' families to provide them additional information. "What I can say to them, and to all Mexicans, is that we're working on the investigation. And they should have confidence."

Video footage less than a minute in length and perhaps taken by a cell phone perhaps belonging to one of the detained suspects was obtained by Mexican national police. Shown to two relatives of the victims, one of them, Adam Langford, said it showed a dozen or so men presumed as members of the Chihuahua cartel "all in black [...] with assault rifles going toward the vehicles, toward their prey [...]. At the end, [...] the jefe guy says, 'Burn it! Burn it! Burn it! Quémalo' in Spanish."

In December 2019, the Mexican federal government consolidated what had been Sonoran and federal cases into exclusively federal prosecutions, with several suspects being arrested on December 1, 2019 with regard to the crimes and director of public safety in Janos, Chihuahua Fidel Alejandro Villegas Villegas's arrest by the Mexican Attorney General's Office on December 24 for Villegas's allegedly providing protection for criminal activities by such as La Linea as for colluding in the massacre. A cousin of the victims, Julian LeBarón, told The New York Times, "It's common knowledge down here that the police work with the criminals. They have a monopoly on security, and they get paid a wage for protection, and later we find out that they participate in the murder of women and children."

A man identified as "Alfredo 'L'" and a "likely participant in the events that occurred on November 4, 2019," was detained in Ciudad Juárez on November 4, 2020 and subsequently arrested on homicide charges by Mexican authorities.

Three suspects, including the supposed mastermind Roberto N (alias "The Mute" and "The 32"), believed to be members of La Línea drug cartel, were arrested on November 25, 2020.

== Reactions and subsequent memorials ==
Donald Trump
(@realDonaldTrump)
tweeted:

This is the time for Mexico, with the help of the United States, to wage WAR on the drug cartels and wipe them off the face of the earth. We merely await a call from your great new president!

November 5, 2019

US President Donald Trump offered Mexico military support to assist with defeating the drug cartels. The offer was declined by Mexican President Andrés Manuel López Obrador, but said that he would speak with Trump over security cooperation between the two nations.

The Church of Jesus Christ of Latter-day Saints issued a statement expressing its "love, prayers, and sympathies" but also noting its understanding that the victims were not members of the church.

A member of the extended family, Julian LeBarón, whose brother Benjamin was killed by cartel gunmen in 2009, claims that the attack was targeted. He states that there can be no mistaken identity as the surviving children claimed that one of the female victims had attempted to identify herself to stop the attack. A family member has claimed that the cartels in Mexico have increased their levels of barbarity, and are on the same level if not worse than ISIL as ISIL has an ideology and the cartels are driven by greed and "pure evil". She continued to claim that Mexico "refused to overcome their pride" and accept help from a neighboring country or international coalition.

On January 12, 2020, Mexico's president, Andrés Manuel López Obrador, and Sonora governor, Claudia Pavlovich Arellano, visited LaMora. Julian LeBarón said LaMora community members would be among those participating in a march sponsored by the advocacy group Defensa por la Vida y la Paz or Defense for Life & Peace slated for January 23–25 from Cuernavaca, Morelos, to Mexico's National Palace in Mexico City, with the intention, according to one of its organizers, the poet Javier Sicilia, of their reception by President López Obrador.

== Selected media ==
- The Mexican Mormon War, documentary on the Mormon vigilante militia fighting a drug cartel in Chihuahua
- Bennion, Janet (2012). "The Church of the Firstborn of the 'Fulness' of Times (The LeBarons)". Polygamy in Primetime: Media, Gender, and Politics in Mormon Fundamentalism. Brandeis University Press. pp. 43–50. ISBN 9781611682960.
- LeBaron, Verlan M. & LeBaron, Charlotte K. (1981). The LeBaron Story (a free Kindle edition). Keels & Co. ASIN B0006E53ZM.
- Hales, Brian C. (2006). "The LeBarons". Modern Polygamy and Mormon Fundamentalists: The Generations After the Manifesto. Kofford Books. ISBN 9781589580350.
- Hales, Brian C. "MF0224 LeBarons, research file" (PDF). Fundamentalist Documents. MormonPolygamyDocuments.org.

== See also ==
- List of massacres in Mexico
