= Ernesto Alfredo Piñón de la Cruz =

Mexican criminal (1989–2023)

- Born: 6 April 1989
- Died: 5 January 2023 (aged 33); Ciudad Juárez, Mexico
- Occupations: Criminal; Car dealer
- Criminal charges: Kidnapping

Ernesto Alfredo Piñón de la Cruz, also known as El Neto, (6 April 1989 – 5 January 2023) was a Mexican criminal known for his leadership over Los Mexicles, a street gang based in Ciudad Juárez and allied with the Sinaloa Cartel.

== Biography ==
El Neto was born on 6 April 1989 and started his criminal career before he reached adulthood. In 2009, authorities in the Mexican state of Chihuahua arrested him in connection with 30 kidnappings, including a judge. On 14 December 2010, he was sentenced to 224 years in prison.

In 2020, El Neto replaced Jesús Eduardo "El Lalo" Soto Rodríguez as leader of Los Mexicles. On 1 January 2023, he escaped during the 2023 Ciudad Juárez prison attack alongside approximately 20 others. However, the second highest-ranking member of the gang, César “El Chilín” Vega Muñoz, was killed during the attack.

El Neto was killed in a shootout with police in Ciudad Juárez on 5 January 2023 at the age of 33, four days after his escape from prison.
