= Eduardo Ravelo =

Mexican American gangster (born 1968)

FBI Ten Most Wanted Fugitive
- Charges: Racketeering, conspiracy to launder monetary instruments, Conspiracy to possess heroin, cocaine and marijuana with the intent to distribute
- Alias: Tablas

Description
- Born: October 13, 1968 (age 57); Mexico
- Nationality: Mexican American

Status
- Added: October 20, 2009
- Caught: June 26, 2018
- Number: 493
- Captured

Eduardo "Richolm" Ravelo (born October 13, 1968) is a Mexican American gangster who was a leader of the Barrio Azteca gang. He is also a former fugitive wanted on several charges related to drugs and organized crime. On October 20, 2009, he was named by the FBI as the 493rd fugitive to be placed on the Ten Most Wanted list. He was captured in Mexico on June 26, 2018.

== Background ==
Since 1994, Ravelo has cultivated relationships with some of the highest-ranking cartel members. He rose to power within the Barrio Aztecas because of his connections with the Juárez Cartel.

In 2005, an informant and former Barrio Azteca lieutenant testified that Ravelo told him to help find fellow gang members who had stolen from the cartel. The informant testified that later he was taken to a house in El Paso, Texas, where a gang member's mouth, wrists and ankles were bound with duct tape. He was delivered to the Juarez cartel and never heard from again.

In March 2008, he became the leader of the gang shortly after betraying his predecessor, stabbing him several times and shooting him in the neck.

Ravelo and his gang members are allegedly hit-men for a Mexican drug cartel and are responsible for multiple homicides. Barrio Azteca has approximately 600 active members who engage in illegal activities such as arson, assault, auto theft, contract killing, extortion, illegal immigration, kidnapping, money laundering, murder, prostitution, racketeering, human and drug trafficking. Many of the members are in American and Mexican prisons and benefit from the gang's profits by having funds placed in their prison commissary accounts.

Ravelo is originally from Mexico, but has permanent resident status in the United States, helping him to cross the Mexico – United States border. Ravelo was believed to be hiding with his wife and children in a Barrio Aztecas-controlled neighborhood in Ciudad Juárez, just across the border from El Paso, Texas. He was said to have bodyguards and armored vehicles to protect him from rival gangs and rival cartels.

Federal authorities stated that Ravelo might have altered his appearance by plastic surgery, and fingertips to disguise his fingerprints.

On June 26, 2018, the FBI announced that Ravelo along with several other Barrio Azteca gang members had been arrested during a police raid in Mexico.
