= Jesús Alberto Capella Ibarra =

Mexican police officer

Alberto Capella is a Mexican law enforcement officer and former Tijuana's Commissioner of Police or Secretary of Public Security (Secretario Municipal de Seguridad Pública) of the municipality of Tijuana.

Made famous for his tough stance against Mexico's notorious drug industry, which in the past had been virtually non-existent in Mexico. Due to the nature of his involvement in attempts to stop drug trafficking, notably among the Tijuana drug cartels, Capella has been the subject of assassination attempts and extortion.

Capella Ibarra was removed from the position of Secretary for Public Security on December 1, 2008. In an unprecedented and unexplained move, he was substituted by a military official, Lieutenant Colonel Julián Leyzaola.

Capella Ibarra was renamed again Secretary of Public Security of the municipality of Tijuana on October 4, 2011, by his godfather Carlos Bustamante who was mayor at the time.
