= Barrio Azteca =

Mexican-American gang originally based in El Paso, Texas

- Founded: 1986; 40 years ago
- Founding location: El Paso, Texas, United States
- Years active: 1986–present
- Territory: Texas, New Mexico, Arizona, Massachusetts, Pennsylvania, and Chihuahua
- Ethnicity: Mexican and Mexican American
- Membership (est.): 8,000
- Activities: Drug trafficking, human trafficking, arson, murder, assault, auto theft, burglary, extortion, intimidation, kidnapping and robbery
- Allies: Juárez Cartel; La Línea
- Rivals: Los Mexicles; Sinaloa Cartel; Border Brothers
- Notable members: Eduardo Ravelo

Barrio Azteca (Spanish pronunciation: [ˈbarjo asˈteka]), or Los Aztecas (pronounced [los asˈtekas]), is a Mexican-American street and prison gang originally based in El Paso, Texas, USA and Ciudad Juarez, Chihuahua, Mexico. The gang was formed in the Coffield Unit, located near Tennessee Colony, Texas by Jose "Raulio" Rivera, a prisoner from El Paso, in the early 1980s. It expanded into a transnational criminal organization that traded mainly across the US-Mexico border. Currently one of the most violent gangs in the United States, they are said to have over 3,000 members across the country in locations such as New Mexico, Texas, Massachusetts, and Pennsylvania as well as at least 5,000 members in Ciudad Juarez, Mexico.

In 2008, Barrio Azteca formed an alliance with La Línea, the armed wing of the Juárez Cartel, to fight off the forces of the Sinaloa Cartel, who were attempting to take over the drug smuggling routes in the area. Control of the routes in Ciudad Juárez, known as the "Juárez plaza," is vital for drug trafficking organizations, since they are a major illicit conduit into the United States. The DEA estimates that about 70% of the cocaine to enter the United States does so through the area. The gang's primary source of income derives from smuggling drugs across the border from Mexico to the United States. They are also responsible for the distribution and sale of narcotics both in and outside prisons. Besides drug trafficking, they have been charged with a medley of different crimes.

The gang, which operates in the U.S. and Mexico, has morphed into a prime example of the "cross-border nature of Mexico's drug war." Members may either be US or Mexican citizens. Most of the violence associated with the gang occurs in Mexico. By June 2020, the Sinaloa Cartel's Los Salazar cell, and not Barrio Azteca, was the only other organized crime group which was considered on par with La Linea for control of the Ciudad Juárez drug trafficking market.

== History ==
=== Background ===
The Barrio Azteca gang was formed in the jails of El Paso in 1986 and gained an image of being a tough and loyal gang willing to commit murder of civilians in order to keep fear in the minds of its members and ensure their loyalty/obedience.

Some believe that the growth of Barrio Azteca in Mexico is due to the area's distinctive cross-border nature. The area of El Paso and Ciudad Juárez is in many ways one community, with families, friends, businesses – and even gangs – joined in the same urban sprawl. Some undocumented Mexicans arrested in the United States are imprisoned in Texan prisons and consequently join Barrio Azteca. When they are absolved from their sentences, they are sent to their country of origin, where they quickly join the gang's ranks and carry out a number of crimes. The Barrio Azteca has long sold drugs moved by the Juárez Cartel. As Barrio Azteca grew in power, it began to work directly with the Juarez Cartel and their alliance grew stronger. The gang began to directly buy large sums of cocaine from the cartel at cheaper rates, and in return the gang would buy weapons in so called straw purchases from Texan gun shops and then smuggle them across the border. Furthermore, if the cartel needed to intimidate or carry out an assassination in the United States, they would simply call on the Barrio Azteca. When the Sinaloa Cartel made its first incursion into Ciudad Juárez in 2008, Barrio Azteca was called to defend the plaza. They are alleged by the Mexican authorities to have committed numerous brutal assassinations in the city, although the exact numbers are unknown. In addition, Barrio Azteca controls most of the drug sales for the Juárez Cartel in Ciudad Juárez's streets and prisons, although other gangs and independent operators abound.

Barrio Azteca is also reported to have kidnapped people in El Paso and drive them south into Ciudad Juárez to kill them. A murder in Texas drives a huge investigation which often leads to an arrest. But in Ciudad Juárez, it is one of the more than ten corpses found dead on a daily basis. The gang also tortures and murders its victims in front of a large and cheering gang audience. According to the testimony of an alleged Barrio Azteca member, gang members torture and kill their victims by digging up holes in the ground, throwing a bunch of mesquite, and then pouring in some gasoline. The gang members then beat up their victims and throw them in the hole. Then they light the whole thing on fire.

=== Eduardo Ravelo's era ===
Eduardo Ravelo, the captured former leader of the Barrio Azteca, began his criminal career in the year 2003, amassing a list of charges for racketeering and numerous conspiracy charges with the intent to distribute narcotics. In the year 2005, an informant and former lieutenant of the gang testified that Ravelo was looking for a man who had stolen goods from the Juárez cartel. The informant said that Ravelo was taken to a house in El Paso where a gang member was being held, his mouth, wrists, and ankles bound with duct tape. Ravelo then ordered the traitor to be sent to the Juárez cartel, and he was never heard from again. In El Paso Ravelo's gang is known as Barrio Azteca, a gang originally morphed from the so-called Mexican Mafia prison gang. During its initial years, the gang's aim was street robbery to collect funds to liberate prisoners in jail. Today, the gang has expanded into a large criminal gang with presence in both the United States and Mexico, besetting by drug trafficking and human smuggling. In Ciudad Juárez, however, the gang is known as Los Aztecas. Under the tutelage of Ravelo, the gang moves narcotics along the border with the aid of Vicente Carrillo Fuentes' cartel.

According to reports of U.S. authorities, Ravelo was born in Mexico but has permanent residence in the United States. He allegedly pays his sicarios (hitmen) less than 500 pesos (or about $40 U.S. dollars) a week to carry out assassinations. When drug loads go missing while being smuggled, suspects are kidnapped and taken to Ciudad Juárez. Some are shot dead, while others are tortured and then shot. Some, however, are beheaded. Not all the killings carried about by Ravelo's gang are a result of drug disputes. Some murders are carried out to intimidate and as retaliation attacks.

=== Ciudad Juárez prison massacres ===
First prison massacre

A fierce battle between rival drug trafficking organizations broke loose inside a prison on the outskirts of Ciudad Juárez on 5 March 2009. The violence resulted in the deaths of 20 inmates. It took the guards, police, and Mexican military more than three hours to put down the unrest inside the prison. From a distance, family members awaited news as black smoke drifted from the prison and helicopters patrolled overhead. At one point, inmates could be seen lighting mattresses and bodies being thrown from second-story windows. The brawl, which was between Barrio Azteca and Los Mexicles, erupted at around 6 a.m. after the conclusion of a series of conjugal visits. Alongside Los Mexicles were the Artistas Asesinos, a rival gang and an enforcer group of the Sinaloa cartel. All 20 of the dead were members of Los Mexicles and Artistas Asesinos, indicating that the prison fight was instigated by members of the Barrio Azteca group. One report issued by Los Angeles Times stated that members of Barrio Azteca stole the keys of a prison guard and were able to free their cohorts and begin a rampage in cells controlled by their rival groups. In a relatively low-security area inside the prison, the gang members began to produce knives and force other guards to liberate 150 fellow members. Once they took the guards hostage, Barrio Azteca members went into high-security blocks where the rival members were in, forced the guards to open them, and went about killing the rival inmates. Some of the victims were stabbed with knives, while others were beaten to death; some were killed with home-made guns.

The Mexican authorities were able to militarize the area with more than 200 federal police officers, 50 soldiers, two helicopters, a plane, and an unknown number of state and municipal police forces. The exact reasons for the massacre are unknown, but the feud between Barrio Azteca and Artistas Asesinos runs deep, and they often fight for the control of drugs, guns, and other illicit contrabands inside prisons. This massacre had come after a rare experience of 24 hours without any drug-related assassinations in Ciudad Juárez and after a large military buildup during that weekend. Back in 2005, the Barrio Azteca gang had carried out a murderous attack against members of Los Mexicles inside the same prison, leaving six dead.

Second prison massacre

At around 9:00 p.m. on 26 July 2011, the Barrio Azteca carried out an attack on Los Mexicles, a street gang of the Sinaloa cartel, which left 17 dead and 20 injured inside a prison in Ciudad Juárez. Some of the violence was captured by a surveillance video that shows two gunmen clearing a hallway of guards before unlocking a door and allowing several triggermen to shoot inside a room where the inmates were killed. The violence continued elsewhere throughout the prison until around 2 a.m. the next day. Although there was no audio in the video, the footage shows how two gunmen order the guards to leave. Despite being armed, they seem to follow the orders of the gang members without any resistance. Following their exit, the two men open a different door and allowed four other accomplices into the hallway, some of them who were carrying assault rifles. At that point, the triggermen opened the doors of another room, and that is when the firing began. Officials of the state of Chihuahua said they were unable to locate the five weapons used in the massacre; nonetheless, an AR-15 assault rifle, one of the weapons thought to be used in the massacre, was confiscated.

Initial reports had stated that the massacre had started as a clash between prison gangs, but the surveillance video shows "cold-blood executions," and that the members of the Barrio Azteca gang carried out the shootout without any provocation from their enemies. According to The Guardian, the video suggests that the guards may have allowed the assassins to kill the inmates, proving that the prison was plagued by "weak controls, disorganisation and possible corruption." Their reports state that the inmates had broken the rules of the jail and held large parties, possibly with the guards' permission. Moreover, the prison was highly overcrowded, with over 2,700 inmates in a facility with a capacity of only 850 prisoners.

=== Villas de Salvárcar massacre ===
Gunmen burst into a party in a small working-class neighborhood known as Villas de Salvárcar in Ciudad Juárez, killing 16 teenagers on 31 January 2010. Witnesses said that the cartel members arrived at the crime scene in seven cars with tinted windows, closed down the street and blocked the exits. Then they stormed the party and opened fire at the victims as they were watching a soccer game. Some of the teenagers were shot as they tried to flee and their corpses were found in the neighboring houses. As neighbors hid in their houses, some dialed the emergency services but the Mexican military and the Federal police did not arrive until after the killers had left. When the Mexican authorities arrived, a large crowd gathered at the crime scene as the neighbors and family members of the victims, whose ages ranged from 15 to 20, cried and set down candles. They pleaded for their names not to be released for the fear of the hit men returning and taking revenge. The relatives and witnesses interviewed after the massacre insisted that the teenagers had nothing to do with the drug trade and were "good kids." What was troubling for the authorities was that the victims were not gathered inside a bar or at a rehab center, but rather at a private home. They gave no official statement for the motives behind the killing, but the massacre bore all the signs of the drug violence that Ciudad Juárez was experiencing for the past three years. Videos from the crime scene depict a sparsely furnished home with large puddles of blood and taints smeared on the walls; in addition, more than 100 AK-47 bullet casings were found at the crime scene. The Mexican authorities issued a money reward of $1 million pesos for anyone who could provide information that led to the arrest of the killers.

One by one, the coffins of the victims were carried out from their homes on 4 February 2010, as their families demanded for justice. The governor of the state of Chihuahua, José Reyes Baeza Terrazas, showed up at the funeral unexpectedly to pay his respects to the families. Felipe Calderón, Mexico's president, also visited the family members and handed a memorial plaque to the parents of the victims. The mayor of Ciudad Juárez said that the massacre was a random act of violence by Mexico's drug gangs because the victims had no apparent ties with organize crime. But Calderón was widely criticized for his initial comments after the massacre, in which he claimed that the investigations had shown that those killed were almost certainly targeted for being involved in organized crime. The parents of the victims hung huge placards outside their houses accusing Calderón of failing to solve the massacre and explicitly saying that "until those responsible are found, [he was] the murderer." The federal government of Mexico responded to the massacre by implementing the "Todos Somos Juárez" program, which aimed to improve education and social development, create jobs, and improve the health benefits in Ciudad Juárez. It has paid $400 million to repair the city's social fabric. Calderón has met with young people and representatives of the federal program to discuss and analyze the city's achievements. He also unveiled a billboard facing traffic in El Paso, Texas heading into Mexico that reads "No More Weapons," and criticized the United States for not renewing a ban on the sales of assault weapons that expired in 2004.

Four days after the massacre, a suspect identified as José Dolores Arroyo Chavarría was arrested by the Mexican military. He confessed to the authorities that the Juárez Cartel had received reports from within the organization that members of a rival drug trafficking organization were at the party the night the teenagers were killed. The suspect said he acted as a lookout for the 24 gunmen that perpetrated the killing and had orders to "kill everyone inside." By mid-2011, four men linked to the massacre were found guilty of the killings and were sentenced to 240 years each by the state of Chihuahua. In 2012 it was later confirmed by the Mexican authorities that the massacre was ordered by José Antonio Acosta Hernández (El Diego), a former drug baron of La Línea that is now imprisoned. A gang leader of Barrio Azteca also admitted to have ordered the massacre because he thought rival gang members were there. Despite the arrests, many of the family members were unhappy with the efforts of the Mexican government and said that they were planning to abandon Mexico and seek safe haven in Texas to protect their children. "I never even gave the United States much thought," said one of the family members, "But Mexico has abandoned us, betrayed us."

2010 was the most violent year in the history of Ciudad Juárez, where more than 3,000 people were killed. Massacres, shootings, beheadings, torture videos on YouTube, and even car bombs were recorded in Ciudad Juárez that year. Numerous media outlets around the world considered Ciudad Juárez as one of the most dangerous – if not the most dangerous – city on the planet in 2010.

=== U.S. Consulate assassinations ===
Initial reports stated that unknown gunmen of a drug trafficking organization shot and killed a pregnant U.S. consulate woman and her husband in broad daylight in Ciudad Juárez on 13 March 2010, leaving a baby wailing in the back seat of the car. Later on that same day, gunmen killed the husband of another consulate worker and wounded his two young children. The shootings took place in different locations, and it was the "first deadly attack" against U.S. officials and their families from the Mexican criminal organizations. The attack came during a violent weekend across Mexico, where nearly 50 people were killed across the country. The killings angered the White House, who had quietly allowed the families of the U.S. consulate workers to live across the border in Texas even before they were killed. The weapons used in the attack and the style the U.S. officials were killed pointed to drug traffickers as suspects; evidence provided from American intelligence and Mexican authorities then pointed to Barrio Azteca as the perpetrators. A day after the killings, the United States Department of State authorized the temporary departure of the workers in the U.S. consulate throughout northern Mexico, including the cities of Tijuana, Nogales, Matamoros, Nuevo Laredo, Monterrey, and Ciudad Juárez. This was not solely a response for the incident in Ciudad Juárez, but because of the drug-related violence along the border.

The leader of Barrio Azteca, Arturo Gallegos Castrellón, better known for his nickname El Farmero, ordered the execution of two American consulate workers and a Mexican with ties to the agency in Ciudad Juárez on 13 March 2010. Gallegos targeted the American officials because he believed they had given visas to members of a rival gang, although some say it was a case of mistaken identity. According to Reuters, the killings was an ongoing effort by Barrio Azteca to take control of the El Paso–Juárez drug trafficking corridor. After the arrest of a suspect in connection with the killings, the gang member said that Barrio Azteca was pursuing a guard from the El Paso County Jail and not the U.S. officials, but this information has not been confirmed. Reportedly, the gang leaders wanted the guard dead for mistreating members of the gang in jail. The speculation of this hypothesis was bolstered by the fact that the second victim was also in a white SUV, but U.S. authorities do not discard the possibility that the gunmen were searching for someone else in the second attack and coincidentally happened to be a white vehicle too, killing the consulate workers by mistake. Others had other speculations on the attack; it was unclear whether the consulate worker was targeted for being slow with the visas of some cartel members; whether the worker had angered some members inside a Texan prison; whether the attack intended to be a message to the American drug agents; or whether simply a case of mistaken identity. Whatever the reasons, the attack sent shock waves and huge concern for the United States' role in Mexico, and how American street gangs are quickly adopting the violent tactics of Mexico's drug trafficking organizations and making alliances with them just across the border.

On April 5, 2012, the authorities concluded that the Barrio Azteca murdered the three U.S. consulate members as part of an agreement with José Antonio Acosta Hernández (El Diego), a former top lieutenant of the Juárez cartel who was imprisoned after being convicted and receiving a life sentence.

On March 9, 2020, Mexican police arrested Luis “El Tio” (‘The Uncle’) Gerrado Mendez, a former member of Barrio Azteca who later became the reputed founder of La Empresa (‘The Company’), for his connection to the consulate murders as well. Mendez, who was the El Paso FBI office's most wanted fugitive and the last person sought for the attacks, also made La Empresa a hybrid of Barrio Azteca. With his arrest, all 35 suspects named by the U.S. Justice Department in 2011 for involvement in the consulate killings had been captured.

=== Horizontes del Sur massacre ===
During a boy's birthday party at the Horizontes del Sur neighborhood in Ciudad Juárez, Chihuahua, several gunmen broke into a house and killed 14 people and wounded more than a twenty on 23 October 2010. After firing more than 70 bullets, the attackers fled the scene in three different cars at around 11:00 p.m. According to the witnesses' descriptions, the attackers were teenagers who had secured the area by blocking traffic. The Mexican police declined to comment if the killing was drug-related, but Felipe Calderón's response was remarkably different from the Villas de Salvárcar massacre, where he claimed that the massacre was most likely due to internal adjustments between the cartels. The killing in Horizontes del Sur bore striking similarities with the massacre in the Villas de Salvárcar neighborhood earlier that same year, which took place just a mile away and where 15 were gunned down at a party too. This attack came just a week before several gunmen stormed two houses, killing 7 at a party and 2 at a nearby house.

The Mexican authorities concluded that there were two possible explanations for the massacre: Either La Línea and Barrio Azteca were responsible for the killings; or "independent gunmen" paid to kill a person nicknamed El Ratón, an alleged member of Artistas Asesinos.

=== Decline ===
In June 2020, it was reported that La Línea was the Juárez Cartel's most powerful faction in Ciudad Juárez. Los Salazar, a powerful cell of the Sinaloa Cartel, had by this point also managed to build a significant presence in Ciudad Juárez and was seen as on par with La Línea in the Ciudad Juárez drug trafficking market as well.

== Modus operandi ==
The gang has a militaristic structure, and includes captains, lieutenants, sergeants, and foot soldiers used with the sole purpose of maintaining territorial control and enriching its members and associates through drug trafficking, homicide, money laundering, extortion, and intimidation. In and outside of prison, from gang beatings to drive-by shootings, Barrio Azteca disciplines its own members and rivals. The "life-blood" of the gang is the drug sale, which they buy at a low cost due to their alliance with the Juárez cartel and profits from its own importation to the U.S. They also tax ("cuota") independent drug dealers in El Paso, in other parts of West Texas, and in the Eastern part of New Mexico. Once the money is collected, the Barrio Azteca members deposit it into the bank accounts of imprisoned leaders of their own organization, often using fake names and female associates by wire transfer.

The gang also utilized a sophisticated communication network where they utilize coded letters, contraband cell phones that are smuggled into prison cells, and distribution of membership roster and hit-lists. To prevent officers from understanding their communication network, Barrio Azteca also created a secret language based on Nahuatl. The locus of power of Barrio Azteca is based inside prisons, prompting worries that the operational capacity of the gang is not hindered when its leaders are imprisoned. Members of Barrio Azteca tend to have both Mexican and U.S. citizenship, and authorities believe they carry out crimes in Ciudad Juárez and then return legally to the United States. In March 2010, the FBI and the police department in El Paso stated that Barrio Azteca was more powerful than Los Zetas in the Juárez plaza. They had a membership of 2,000 strong in Ciudad Juárez alone that year. There are around 500 small gangs working for the Barrio Azteca and looking to earn a position by "joining the big shots."

Gang members in the organizations refer to each other as "carnal," a slang term for brother. Outside of prison, members would contact imprisoned leaders to verify a status of a person using the name of Barrio Azteca to operate and see if they were in good standing with the organization. Those who were not in good standing were executed. Officials on both sides of the border have observed how Barrio Azteca locate their targets, stalk them and finally ambush them in multiple car chases, using coded radio communications, coordinated blocking maneuvers, and with well-trained shooters wearing ski masks and body armor. After fulfilling their mission, the gang members return to safe houses throughout the city or return across the international bridge to El Paso. Ciudad Juárez is filled with safe houses, armories and garages with stolen cars for the cartel members and assassins to use. They work day in and day out, often with a list of people to kill. Barrio Azteca has also authorized the killings of U.S. law enforcement officials for cracking down their criminal operations, offering up to $200,000 U.S. dollars. Drug-sniffing dogs were also under a bounty. None of the threats were materialized, however.

== Arrests ==
On June 26, 2018, Barrio Azteca Capo Eduardo "Tablas" Ravelo was arrested. Ravelo, who was also on the FBI Ten Most Wanted Fugitives list, is believed to have been in charge of the gang's operations in Juárez. Several other members of the Barrio Azteca were arrested with Ravelo as well. On November 7, 2018, Rene Gerardo Santana Garza, known as "El 300," was arrested in Chihuahua City. Santana is accused of being a major force in the recent bloodshed which occurred in Juárez. In November 2019, three members of La Empresa were arrested. On March 5, 2020, 9 suspected La Empresa members were arrested.

In January 2020, Juarez police arrested the leader of the group's "Old Guard" faction, Jesus Alfredo Martinez Mendoza, alias "El Freddy or El Ferro." In addition to being the leader of this Barrio Azteca fraction, Mendoza was also target No. 6 on a list of border crime suspects sought by U.S. and Mexican authorities. On May 21, 2020, high ranking Barrio Azteca leader Jose Dolores Villegas Soto, who is known by his moniker "El Iraqui," and aliases "El Iraki" and "El Lolo," was arrested with 10 other suspected Barrio Azteca members. Soto was also revealed to be the leader of the La Empresa cartel at the time of his arrest, and that his successor was identified as "The Gnome." The Gnome retaliated to the arrests of not only Soto, but also two other high ranking La Empresa leaders Luis "El Tio" Mendez and Jorge Antonio “El Goofy" Calderon with attacks on police officers.

== See also ==
- War on drugs

== Bibliography ==
- Bowden, Charles (2010). Murder City: Ciudad Juárez and the Global Economy's New Killing Fields (6th ed.). Nation Books. ISBN 978-1568586229.
- Campbell, Howard (2009). Drug War Zone: Frontline Dispatches from the Streets of El Paso and Juárez (6th ed.). University of Texas Press. ISBN 9780292721791.
- R. V. Gundur. 2019. "Negotiating Violence and Protection in Prison and on the Outside: The Organizational Evolution of the Transnational Prison Gang Barrio Azteca." International Criminal Justice Review
- Potter, Gary (2010). Drugs in Society: Causes, Concepts and Control (6th ed.). Elsevier. ISBN 978-1437744507.
- Small Arms Survey (2010). Small Arms Survey 2010: Gangs, Groups, and Guns (1st ed.). Cambridge University Press. ISBN 978-0521146845.
- Grillo, Ioan (2012). El Narco: The Bloody Rise of Mexican Drug Cartels (2nd ed.). Bloomsbury Publishing. ISBN 978-1408824337.
