= Juan Pablo Ledezma =

Mexican drug lord

- Born: December 28, 1987 (age 38); Ciudad Juarez, Chihuahua, Mexico
- Other names: El JL, Juan Pablo Ledesma, José Luis Fratello, Luis Ledesma, Juan Pablo Ledesma, Eduardo Ledesma, Luis Pablo Ríos Rodríguez
- Occupation: Leader of the Juárez Cartel
- Status: Fugitive
- Criminal charges: Murder, extortion, drug trafficking
- Reward amount: Mexico: 15 million Mexican Pesos; USA: $2.5 million USD

Juan Pablo Ledezma (born December 28, 1987), also known as José Luis Fratello, is the alleged current leader of the Mexican gang La Línea, which is the leading armed wing of the Juárez Cartel, and is said to be the current head of the organization.

== Arrest warrant ==
The Mexican government is currently offering a $2 million USD bounty for information leading to his capture. In 2019, imprisoned Sinaloa Cartel operative Jesús 'El Rey' Zambada revealed that notorious Sinaloa Cartel leader Joaquin "El Chapo" Guzman had issued a bounty for Ledezma's death after Ledezma ended the Juarez Cartel's alliance with the Sinaloa Cartel. Ledezma is also suspected of orchestrating El Chapo’s brother’s killing in prison. Zambada also claimed that Ledezma was the only person who earned "an enormous hatred" from El Chapo. At the time of his arrest in May 2020, it was reported that Luis Alberto “El Mocho” M. was at that point the leader of La Linea and that El Mocho's predecessor, who is also imprisoned, is named Ricardo Arturo “El Piporro” C.

== See also ==
- List of Mexico's 37 most-wanted drug lords
- Mexican drug war
- Mérida Initiative
- War on drugs
