= Vicente Carrillo Leyva =

Mexican drug lord (born 1976)

- Born: 19 July 1976 (age 49); Mexico City, Mexico
- Other names: El Ingeniero
- Occupation: Leader in the Juárez Cartel
- Known for: Drug lord
- Predecessor: Vicente Carrillo Fuentes
- Parent: Amado Carrillo Fuentes

Vicente Carrillo Leyva (born 19 July 1976) is a Mexican "narco-junior" and a leader in the Juárez Cartel.

The son of the drug lord Amado Carrillo Fuentes, head and founder of the Juárez drug cartel who rose to power and riches from humble origins, Carrillo Leyva was told by his father not to enter the drug trafficking business. Amado Carrillo accordingly sent his son to study at the best private universities of Mexico, Switzerland, and Spain, to train as an engineer.

At first contenting himself to rely on the assets and stashed cash of his late father, he eventually was tempted by the huge profits of narco-trafficking and became criminally active in the Juarez cartel.

== Capture ==
Carrillo Leyva was arrested by Mexican police on 2 April 2009, but subsequently acquitted of money laundering charges, though charges of illegal possession of firearms kept him from gaining his freedom. After being found guilty of illegal arms possession, and paying a US$16,000 fine, he was released on 17 December 2010, to the custody of Mexican federal police with new charges of money laundering.

Carrillo Leyva entered the United States government witness protection program, and he lives under a completely different name and identity.

== See also ==
- Gulf Cartel
- Sinaloa Cartel
- Tijuana Cartel
- List of Mexico's 37 most-wanted drug lords
- Mérida Initiative
- Mexican drug war
