= Amado Carrillo Fuentes =

Mexican drug lord (1954–1997)

- Born: Amado Carrillo Fuentes; December 17, 1954; Guamuchilito, Navolato, Sinaloa, Mexico
- Died: July 5, 1997 (aged 42); Mexico City, Mexico
- Other name: El Señor de los Cielos
- Occupation: Drug lord
- Employer: Head of Juárez Cartel
- Predecessor: Rafael Aguilar Guajardo
- Successor: Vicente Carrillo Fuentes
- Children: Vicente Carrillo Leyva
- Relatives: Ernesto Fonseca Carrillo; Vicente Carrillo Fuentes

Amado Carrillo Fuentes (/fuˈɛntəs/; December 17, 1954 – July 4, 1997) was a Mexican drug lord. He seized control of the Juárez Cartel after assassinating his boss Rafael Aguilar Guajardo. Amado Carrillo became known as "El Señor de Los Cielos" ("The Lord of the Skies"), because of the large fleet of jets he used to transport drugs. He was also known for laundering money via Colombia, to finance this fleet.

He died in July 1997, in a Mexican hospital, after undergoing extensive plastic surgery to change his appearance. In his final days, Carrillo was being tracked by Mexican and U.S. authorities.

Amado Carrillo Fuentes was assessed to be worth around $25 billion at the time of his death.

== Early life ==
Carrillo was born to Walter Vicente Carrillo Vega and Aurora Fuentes in Guamuchilito, Navolato, Sinaloa, Mexico. He had eleven siblings.

Carrillo was the nephew of Ernesto Fonseca Carrillo, also known as "Don Neto", the Guadalajara Cartel leader. Amado got his start in the drug business under the tutelage of his Uncle Ernesto and later brought in his brothers, and eventually his son, Vicente José Carrillo Leyva.

Carrillo's father died in April 1986. Carrillo's brother, Cipriano Carrillo Fuentes, died in 1989 under mysterious circumstances.

== Career ==
Initially, Carrillo was part of the Guadalajara Cartel, sent to Ojinaga, Chihuahua to oversee the cocaine shipments of his Uncle, Ernesto Fonseca Carrillo ("Don Neto"), and to learn about border operations from Pablo Acosta Villarreal ("El Zorro de Ojinaga"; "The Ojinaga Fox") and Rafael Aguilar Guajardo. Later, Carrillo worked with Pablo Escobar and the Cali Cartel smuggling drugs from Colombia to Mexico and the United States. He also worked with "El Chapo" (Joaquín Guzmán Loera), the Arellano Félix family, and the Beltrán Leyva organization.

During his tenure, Carrillo reportedly built a multibillion-dollar drug empire. It was estimated that he may have made over $25 billion in revenue over the course of his career.

== Death ==
The pressure to capture Carrillo intensified among U.S. and Mexican authorities after people in Morelos state began silent marches against Governor Jorge Carrillo Olea and his presumed complacency with drug-related violence. Carrillo Fuentes owned a house three blocks from the governor's official residence and regularly held narco-fiestas in the municipality of Tetecala. Governor Carrillo Olea was forced to resign and was arrested; this type of pressure may have convinced Carrillo Fuentes to undergo facial plastic surgery and abdominal surgery liposuction to change his appearance. Subsequently, on July 4, 1997, Carrillo decided to move forward with the operation at Santa Mónica Hospital in Mexico City. During his operation however, some complications arose, which were either caused by a certain medication or a malfunctioning respirator. Carrillo died due to said complications in the early hours of July 5, 1997. His family shared a different story, having told reporters that Carrillo had suffered a heart attack whilst under anesthesia.

Two of Carrillo Fuentes's bodyguards were in the operating room during the procedure. On November 7, 1997, the two surgeons who performed Carrillo's surgery were found dead, encased in concrete inside steel drums, with their bodies showing signs of torture. A third body was also found in a matching barrel, just as mangled as the other two, and is presumed to have been a third doctor who assisted in the surgery. This body however, is unidentifiable, and not confirmed to have been the third surgeon. On November 8, Carrillo's corpse was displayed for a wake at the Federal Judicial Police's morgue in Mexico City.

== Juárez Cartel after Carrillo ==
On the night of August 3, 1997, at around 9:30 p.m., four drug traffickers walked into a restaurant in Ciudad Juárez, pulled out their guns, and opened fire on five diners, killing them instantly. Police estimated that more than 100 bullet casings were found at the crime scene. According to a report issued by the Los Angeles Times, four men went to the restaurant carrying at least two AK-47 automatic rifles while others stood at the doorstep.

On their way out, the gunmen claimed another victim, Armando Olague, a prison official and off-duty law enforcement officer who was gunned down outside the restaurant after he had walked from a nearby bar to investigate the shooting. Reportedly, Olague had run into the restaurant from across the street with a gun in his hand to check out the commotion. It was later determined that Olague was also a known lieutenant of the Juárez Cartel.

Mexican authorities declined to comment on the motives behind the killing, stating the shootout was not linked to Carrillo's death. Nonetheless, it was later stated that the perpetrators were gunmen of the Tijuana Cartel.

Although confrontations between drug traffickers were common in Ciudad Juárez, they rarely occurred in public places. What happened in the restaurant threatened to usher in a new era of border crime in the city.

In Ciudad Juárez, the Office of the Mexican Attorney-General (PGR) seized warehouses that they believed the cartel used to store weapons and cocaine. They also seized over 60 properties all over Mexico belonging to Carrillo and began an investigation into his dealings with police and government officials. Officials also froze bank accounts amounting to $10 billion belonging to Carrillo. In April 2009, Mexican authorities arrested Carrillo's son, Vicente Carrillo Leyva.

== Funeral ==
Carrillo was given a large and lavish, expensive funeral in Guamuchilito, Sinaloa. In 2006, Governor Eduardo Bours asked the federal government to tear down Carrillo's mansion in Hermosillo, Sonora.

== Media portrayals ==
- In second season of TV Series El cartel is portrayed by the Mexican actor Esteban Franco as the character Juan B. Guillén 'El Piloto'.
- In El Chapo (2017), the Netflix and Univision TV series about the life of Joaquín "El Chapo" Guzmán, Carrillo is portrayed by Rodrigo Abed.
- El Señor de los Cielos (2013–), aired as part of Telemundo's nighttime programming, stars the Mexican actor Rafael Amaya as Aurelio Casillas (a fictionalized version of Amado Carrillo Fuentes).
- In the Netflix series Narcos (2017) and Narcos: Mexico (2018–2021), Carrillo is portrayed by José María Yazpik. The series implies Carrillo faked his death in order to survive the drug business and avoid imprisonment.
- In the Netflix series Surviving Escobar (2017), Carrillo is fictionalized as "Señor de los Aires" and portrayed by Mauro Mauad, who also portrayed Amado Carrillo Fuentes in the Fox Premium TV series El General Naranjo (2019)
- In the History Channel mini-series America's War on Drugs (2017), Amado Carrillo Fuentes is portrayed by Tatsu Carvalho
- In the History Latam TV-series Reyes Del Crimen (2018), Amado Carrillo Fuentes is portrayed by Marco Gomez

== See also ==
- Mérida Initiative
- Mexican drug war
