= Los Mexicles =

Mexican street gang

- Founded: 1987
- Founding location: Coffield Unit, Tennessee Colony, Texas, United States (formation); Ciudad Juárez, Chihuahua, Mexico (current base)
- Years active: 1987–present
- Territory: Texas and northern Mexico
- Ethnicity: Mexicans and Mexican-Americans
- Leader: Gerardo León Hill ("El Tokio")
- Activities: Murder, kidnapping, robbery, drug trafficking, vandalism, money laundering, extortion, people smuggling and illegal immigration
- Allies: Jalisco New Generation Cartel (CJNG); La Línea; Sinaloa Cartel
- Rivals: Barrio Azteca
- Notable members: Ernesto Alfredo Piñón de la Cruz ("El Neto")

Los Mexicles is a Mexican street gang based in Ciudad Juárez, Chihuahua. It is allied to the Sinaloa Cartel, a criminal group based in Sinaloa.

== History ==
In 1987, the Mexicles formed in the Texas Department of Criminal Justice's Coffield Unit as a group of Mexican nationals who had been excluded by Barrio Azteca. The group remained a relatively small presence in the Texas prison system, in part because many of its members were foreign nationals who were deported after completing their sentences.

Los Mexicles expanded significantly in Ciudad Juárez during the 2008–2010 period, as the Mexican Drug War intensified. The group, which had previously been linked to the Gulf Cartel, allied with the Sinaloa Cartel and fought against the Juárez Cartel.

On 4 March 2009, members of Los Aztecas attacked Los Mexicles and Artistas Asesinos at the state prison in Ciudad Juárez, killing 20 inmates and injuring at least seven others. The Mexicles and Artistas Asesinos were reportedly aligned with the Sinaloa Cartel, while Los Aztecas were associated with the Juárez Cartel.

Ernesto Alfredo Piñón de la Cruz, also known as "El Neto," was a leader of Los Mexicles until his death in a confrontation with Mexican authorities on 5 January 2023.

On 1 January 2023, armed men attacked Cereso No. 3 prison in Ciudad Juárez in an apparent operation to free members of Los Mexicles. Seventeen people were killed, including 10 prison guards and seven inmates, and 25 prisoners escaped. Piñón de la Cruz was among those who escaped.

== Organization and activities ==
Los Mexicles developed from a prison gang into a criminal organization operating in Ciudad Juárez and other parts of northern Mexico. The group was initially composed largely of Mexican nationals deported from the United States and was involved in vehicle theft, commercial robbery, and extortion before becoming associated with the Sinaloa Cartel.

The group was organized along a paramilitary hierarchy that included a president, vice president, generals, captains, sergeants, and soldiers.

== Recent developments ==
In July 2026, Mexican authorities arrested Gerardo León Gil, known as "El Tokio", in Ciudad Juárez. In August, a federal judge ordered him to stand trial on firearms and drug-related charges. Authorities identified León Gil as the alleged successor to Ernesto Alfredo Piñón de la Cruz as leader of Los Mexicles.
