= Artistas Asesinos =

Mexican street gang

- Founded: 2008
- Founding location: Ciudad Juárez, Chihuahua, Mexico
- Years active: 2008 - Present
- Territory: Chihuahua, Mexico
- Ethnicity: Mexican
- Activities: Murder, drug trafficking, arms trafficking
- Allies: Sinaloa Cartel
- Rivals: Barrio Azteca

Artistas Asesinos (also known as Doble A or AA) is a Mexican street gang that works as an enforcement wing of the Sinaloa Cartel in Ciudad Juárez.
