= Vicente Carrillo Fuentes =

Mexican drug lord (born 1962)

- Born: 16 October 1962 (age 63); Navolato, Sinaloa, Mexico
- Other names: El Viceroy, El General, Andres
- Occupation: Head of the Juárez Cartel
- Height: 6 ft 0.5 in (184 cm)
- Status: Extradited to the United States
- Reward amount: (Mexico) $30 million (MXN) (United States) $20 million (USD)

Vicente Carrillo Fuentes (born 16 October 1962), commonly referred to by his alias El Viceroy, is a Mexican convicted drug lord and former leader of the Juárez Cartel, a drug trafficking organization. The cartel is based in Chihuahua, one of the primary transportation routes for billions of dollars' worth of illegal drug shipments entering the United States from Mexico annually. He was one of Mexico's most-wanted drug lords until his capture in 2014. On 27 February 2025, Carrillo was extradited to the United States.

== Early life ==
Vicente Carrillo Fuentes was born in Guamuchilito, Navolato, Sinaloa, Mexico on 16 October 1962 to Vicente Carrillo and Aurora Fuentes. He had seven siblings: Angélica, Amado, Cipriano, Guadalupe, Alberto, Rodolfo and José Cruz Carrillo Fuentes (Vicente being the fourth one). All are nephews of Ernesto Fonseca Carrillo, a former drug lord.

== Family relations and alliances ==
The Juárez Cartel was founded by his brother Amado Carrillo Fuentes following the death of Pablo Acosta Villarreal.

Cipriano Carrillo Fuentes died in the mid-1980s by gunshot under mysterious circumstances. Amado began in the drug business under the tutelage of his uncle and eventually formed the Juárez Cartel by 1993. Amado brought in his brothers and eventually his son Vicente Carrillo Leyva, who was arrested on 1 April 2009.

When Amado died on 7 July 1997 following complications from plastic surgery, a brief turf war began in Juárez over the leadership of the cartel. Vicente would emerge as the victor after defeating the Muñoz Talavera brothers for control of the cartel. Vicente formed a partnership with Juan José Esparragoza Moreno, his brother Rodolfo Carrillo Fuentes, his nephew Vicente Carrillo Leyva, Ricardo Garcia Urquiza and the Beltrán Leyva brothers. He kept in service several lieutenants formally under his brother, such as "El Chacky" Hernandez.

The organization was in flux by the time Vicente took control of the cartel and the death of Amado created a large power vacuum in the Mexican underworld. The Arellano Félix brothers became the most powerful organization during the 1990s while Vicente was able to avoid direct conflict and increase the strength of the Juárez Cartel. The relationship between the Carrillo Fuentes clan and the other members of the organization grew unstable towards the end of the 1990s and into the 2000s. In 2001 after the escape from prison by Joaquín Guzmán Loera, many of the Juárez Cartel members defected to Guzmán's Sinaloa cartel.

In 2004 Rodolfo Carrillo was killed outside of a movie theatre, allegedly at the behest of Guzmán Loera. Vicente Carrillo responded by having Guzmán Loera's brother "El Pollo" assassinated in prison. This sparked off a turf war; however, it seemed that the war between the two was on hold during 2005 and 2006 because the Sinaloa Cartel was engaged in a vicious war with their rival, the Gulf Cartel. During this time, the leadership of the cartel was between Vicente Carrillo and Ricardo García Urquiza, who was arrested in November 2005. The cartel had become factionalized between the groups loyal to the Carrillo family and the groups loyal to Juan José Esparragoza Moreno and Guzmán Loera's Sinaloa Cartel.

The Juárez Cartel, under the control of Vicente Carrillo Fuentes and his nephew Vicente Carrillo Leyva, was placed under a large degree of pressure following the "House of Death" case, in which the organization was penetrated by law enforcement, but was corrupted by the fact that the informant participated in murders. In 2008, 200 murders occurred in the first three months and it appeared that the war between the Sinaloa Federation and the remnants of the Juárez Cartel was back on. President Calderón sent thousands of troops to Ciudad Juárez. The Juárez Cartel, at one time the most powerful in Mexico, is a shadow of its former self.

== Charges ==
Carrillo Fuentes was charged in a forty-six count indictment in the Western District of Texas with continuing criminal enterprise, importation and possession with intent to distribute cocaine and marijuana, conspiracy to import and possess with intent to distribute cocaine and marijuana, as well as with money laundering, tampering with a witness, ordering the intentional killing of individuals to prevent communication of information by them to U.S. law enforcement, and murder in furtherance of a continuing criminal enterprise. The U.S. Departments of State offered a reward of up to $5 million USD for information leading to the arrest and/or conviction of Vicente Carrillo Fuentes.

=== Kingpin Act sanction ===
On 1 June 2000, the United States Department of the Treasury sanctioned Carrillo Fuentes under the Foreign Narcotics Kingpin Designation Act (sometimes referred to simply as the "Kingpin Act"), for his involvement in drug trafficking along with eleven other international criminals. The act prohibited U.S. citizens and companies from doing any kind of business activity with him, and virtually froze all his assets in the U.S.

== Arrest ==
Carrillo Fuentes was arrested in a joint operation by the Mexican Army and Federal Police in Torreón, Coahuila on 9 October 2014. He was then sent to Mexico City and transferred to the federal installations of SEIDO, Mexico's anti-organized crime investigatory agency, where he gave a formal declaration. Two days later, he was formally charged with drug trafficking and organized crime offenses. On 14 October 2014, Carrillo Fuentes was transferred to the Federal Social Readaptation Center No. 2, a federal maximum-security prison (commonly referred to as "Puente Grande"), in Jalisco state. That same day, he was formally charged by a federal court in Jalisco for violating Mexico's Federal Law of Firearms and Explosives.

== Sentence ==
On 14 September 2021, a Mexican court sentenced Fuentes to 28 years in prison.

== Extradition to the United States ==
On 27 February 2025, Carrillo Fuentes along with 28 other narco figures, including Rafael Caro Quintero, were extradited to the United States. On February 28, 2025, Fuentes was arraigned in a New York federal court in Brooklyn, entering a plea of not guilty to running a criminal enterprise.

== In popular culture ==
A character loosely based on Vicente Carrillo Fuentes was featured in the 2017 TV series "El Chapo". Vicente Carrillo Fuentes is portrayed by Fernando Bonilla in the third season of the Netflix Series Narcos: Mexico.

== See also ==
- List of fugitives from justice who disappeared
- List of Mexico's 37 most-wanted drug lords
- Mérida Initiative
- Mexican drug war
