= Juárez Cartel =

Mexican drug cartel

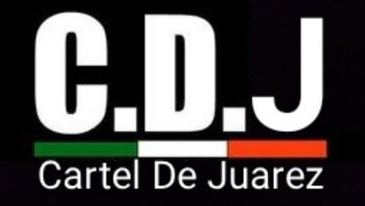
- Artist's rendition of logo
- Founded: 1970
- Founded by: Rafael Aguilar Guajardo, Pablo Acosta Villarreal, Amado Carrillo Fuentes, Vicente Carrillo Fuentes
- Founding location: Ciudad Juárez, Chihuahua, Mexico
- Years active: 1970–present
- Territory: Mexico: Chihuahua (state); Various Mexican cities including: Aguascalientes City, Tijuana, Saltillo, León, Guadalajara, Monterrey, Puebla City, Cancún; Sierra Madre Occidental states: Nayarit, Jalisco, Aguascalientes, Sinaloa, Zacatecas, Durango, and Sonora; United States: Texas, New Mexico, Arizona, Oklahoma
- Ethnicity: Mexican
- Membership: 8,000
- Criminal activities: Drug trafficking, human trafficking, smuggling, money laundering, racketeering, extortion, murder, arms trafficking, bribery.
- Allies: La Línea (lead faction); Beltrán-Leyva Cartel (defunct); Barrio Azteca; Los Zetas; Oaxaca Cartel (defunct); Cali Cartel (defunct); Los Chapitos
- Rivals: Sinaloa Cartel; MS-13; Jalisco New Generation Cartel; Gente Nueva; Knights Templar Cartel; Gulf Cartel; La Familia Michoacana; Tijuana Cartel; La Mayiza (Mexico) Mexican government (United States) U.S. government

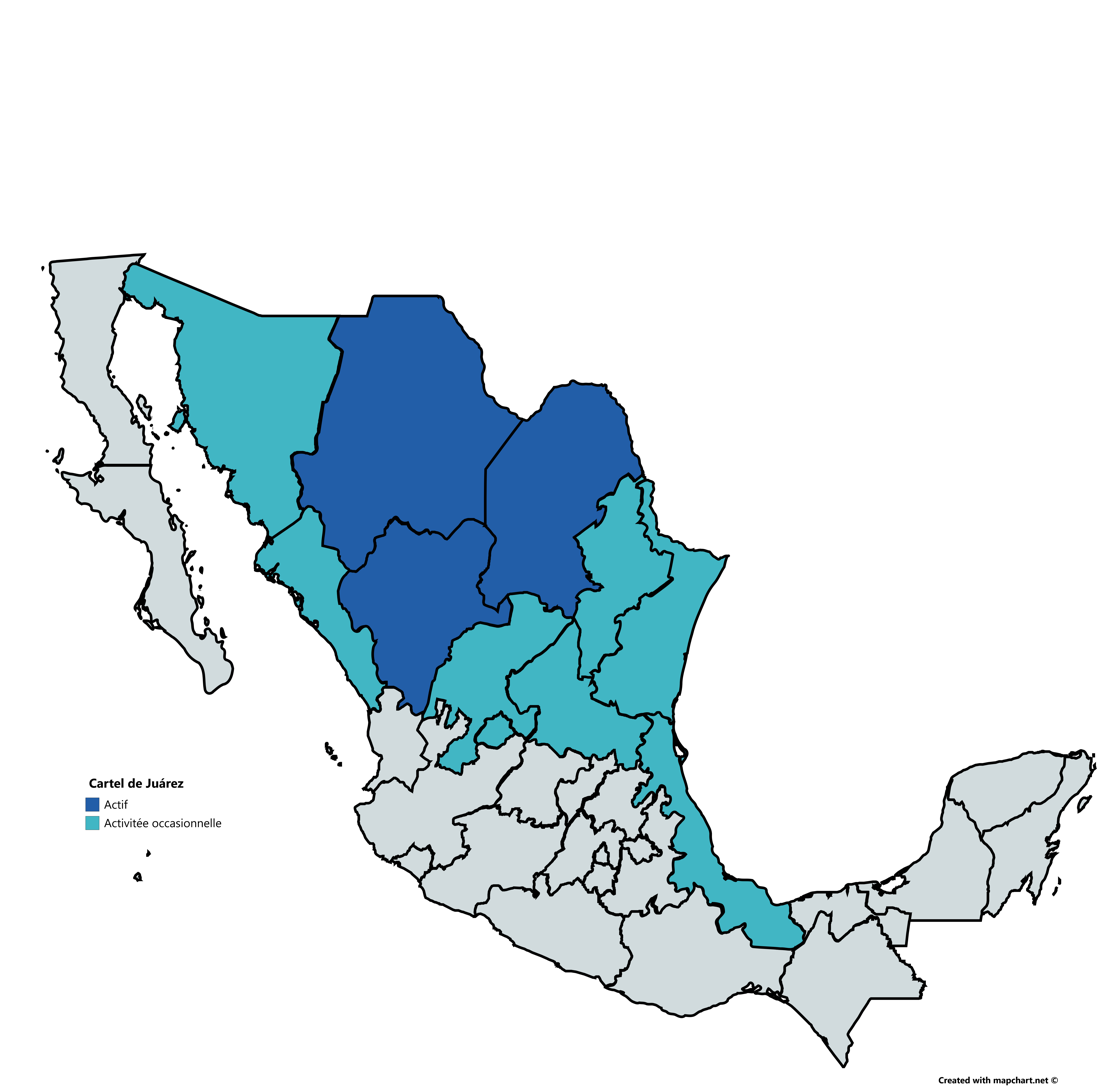
Juarez Cartel activity maps

The Juárez Cartel (Spanish: Cártel de Juárez, pronounced [ˈkaɾtel ðe ˈxwaɾes]), also known as the Vicente Carrillo Fuentes Organization, is a Mexican drug cartel based in Ciudad Juárez, Chihuahua, across the Mexico—U.S. border from El Paso, Texas. The cartel is one of several drug trafficking organizations that have been known to decapitate their rivals, mutilate their corpses and dump them in public places to instill fear not only in the general public but also in local law enforcement and their rivals, the Sinaloa Cartel. Its current known leader is Juan Pablo Ledezma. The Juárez Cartel has an armed wing known as La Línea, a Juárez street gang that usually performs the executions and is now the cartel’s most powerful and leading faction. It also uses the Barrio Azteca gang to attack its enemies.

The Juárez Cartel was the dominant player in the center of the country, controlling a large percentage of the cocaine traffic from Mexico into the United States. The death of Amado Carrillo Fuentes in 1997 was the beginning of the decline of the Juárez cartel, as Carrillo relied on ties to Mexico's top-ranking drug interdiction officer, division general Jesús Gutiérrez Rebollo.

== History ==
The cartel was founded around the 1970s. When leader Pablo Acosta Villarreal was killed in April 1987 during a cross-border raid by Mexican Federal Police helicopters in the Rio Grande village of Santa Elena, Chihuahua, Rafael Aguilar Guajardo took his place along with Amado Carrillo Fuentes, nephew of Ernesto Fonseca Carrillo.

Guajardo was eventually betrayed and murdered in 1993 by Amado, who became the leader of Juarez. Amado brought his brothers into the business. After Amado died in 1997 following complications from plastic surgery, a brief turf war erupted over the control of the cartel, with Amado's brother, Vicente Carrillo Fuentes, becoming leader after defeating the Muñoz Talavera brothers.

Vicente Carrillo Fuentes then formed a partnership with Juan José Esparragoza Moreno, his brother Rodolfo Carrillo Fuentes, his nephew Vicente Carrillo Leyva, Ricardo Garcia Urquiza, and formed an alliance with other drug lords such as Ismael "Mayo" Zambada in Sinaloa and Baja California, the Beltrán Leyva brothers in Monterrey, and Joaquín "El Chapo" Guzmán in Nayarit, Sinaloa, and Tamaulipas.

When Vicente took control of the cartel, the organization was in flux. The death of Amado created a large power vacuum in the Mexican underworld. The Carrillo Fuentes brothers became the most powerful organization during the 1990s while Vicente was able to avoid direct conflict and increase the strength of the Juárez Cartel. The relationship between the Carrillo Fuentes clan and the other members of the organization grew unstable towards the end of the 1990s and into the 2000s. During the 1990s and early 2000s, drug lords from contiguous Mexican states forged an alliance that became known as 'The Golden Triangle Alliance' or 'La Alianza Triángulo de Oro' because of its three-state area of influence: Chihuahua, south of the U.S. state of Texas, Durango and Sinaloa. However, this alliance was broken after the Sinaloa Cartel drug lord, Guzmán, refused to pay the Juarez Cartel for the right to use some smuggling routes into the U.S.

In 2001, after Guzmán escaped from prison, many Juárez Cartel members defected to Guzmán's Sinaloa Cartel. In 2004, Vicente's brother was killed, allegedly by order of Guzmán. Vicente retaliated by assassinating Guzmán's brother in prison. This ignited a turf war between the two cartels, which was more or less put on hold from 2005 to 2006 because of the Sinaloa Cartel's war against the Gulf Cartel.

After the organization collapsed, some elements of it were incorporated into the Sinaloa Cartel, which absorbed much of the Juárez Cartel's former territory. The Juárez Cartel has been able to either corrupt or intimidate high-ranking officials in order to obtain information on law enforcement operatives and acquire protection from the police and judicial systems.

The Juárez cartel has been found to operate in 21 Mexican states. Its principal bases are Culiacán, Monterrey, Ciudad Juárez, Ojinaga, Mexico City, Guadalajara, Cuernavaca and Cancún. Members of the cartel were implicated in the serial murder site in Ciudad Juárez that was discovered in 2004 and has been dubbed the House of Death. Since 2007, the Juárez Cartel has been locked in a vicious battle with its former partner, the Sinaloa Cartel, for control of Juárez. The fighting between them has left thousands dead in Chihuahua. The Juárez Cartel relies on two enforcement gangs to exercise control over both sides of the border: La Linea, a group of corrupt (current and former) Chihuahua police officers, is prevalent on the Mexican side, while the Barrio Azteca street gang operates in Mexico and in Texan cities such as El Paso, Dallas, and Houston, as well as in New Mexico and Arizona. On July 15, 2010, the Juárez Cartel escalated violence to a new level by using a car bomb to target federal police officers.

In September 2011 banners were displayed, publicizing the return of the extinct cartel. They were signed by Cesar "El Gato" Carrillo Leyva, who appears to be the son or a close relative of the late drug lord Amado Carrillo Fuentes.

Prior to 2012, the Juárez Cartel controlled one of the primary transportation routes for billions of dollars' worth of illegal drug shipments annually entering the United States from Mexico. Since then, however, control of these areas has shifted to the Sinaloa Cartel. On September 1, 2013, the Mexican forces arrested Alberto Carrillo Fuentes, alias Betty la Fea ("Ugly Betty"), in the western state of Nayarit. He had taken the leadership of the organization in 2013 after his brother Vicente Carrillo Fuentes (fugitive until his arrest in October 2014) retired following a reported illness.

The Mexican government has auctioned off the villa of the late drug lord Amado Carrillo Fuentes.

The Mexico City home sold for more than $2m (£1.6m) with the proceeds going to Mexico's public health service and its fight against coronavirus.

=== Current alliances ===
Since March 2010, it is alleged that the major cartels have aligned into two loosely allied factions, one integrated by the Juárez Cartel, the Tijuana Cartel, Los Zetas, and the Beltrán-Leyva Cartel; the other faction integrated by the Gulf Cartel, the Sinaloa Cartel and the now disbanded La Familia Cartel. In 2019, it was revealed that notorious Mexican drug lord Joaquin "El Chapo" Guzman put a bounty on Juarez Cartel leader Juan Pablo Ledezma for ending the Juarez Cartel's alliance with his Sinaloa Cartel. By 2020, the Nuevo Cartel de Juárez, allied with the CJNG, began to wrestle control away from the original Juárez Cartel.

=== Decline ===
By 2018, the Juárez Cartel's power declined in its home region of Ciudad Juárez In June 2020, it was reported that La Línea was the Juárez Cartel's most powerful faction in Ciudad Juárez. However, Los Salazar, a powerful cell of the Sinaloa Cartel, had by this point managed to build a significant presence in Ciudad Juárez as well. The Jalisco New Generation Cartel also made its presence in Ciudad Juárez with its New Juarez Cartel, though it failed to deter the hold which La Linea and Los Salazar had over the Ciudad Juárez drug trafficking market as well.

== Media portrayal ==
A fictional Juárez Cartel was featured battling a fictional Tijuana Cartel headed by a character named Obregon in the 2000 film Traffic.

A fictionalized version of the Juárez Cartel plays a major role in the AMC television series Breaking Bad (2008–2013) and its prequel Better Call Saul (2015–2022).

The origins of the Juárez Cartel and its former leaders have also been portrayed in the drama web series Narcos: Mexico (2018–2021).

The Australian ABC documentary La Frontera (2010) described the social impact of the cartel in the region.

A fictional Juarez Cartel appears in Tom Clancy's novel Against All Enemies (2011). It is secretly led by Mexican billionaire Jorge Rojas, who derived the name from its original founder Enrique Juarez. Juarez had established a pharmaceutical company in which Rojas is an investor. Rojas later arranged to produce black-market versions of pharmaceutical drugs, turning in more profit. After Juarez objected to the production, Rojas later had him killed in a skiing "accident" which allowed him to take over the company and turn it into a full-fledged drug cartel that made him one of the richest men in the world.

In the FX series The Bridge, the Juárez Cartel are the main antagonists of the series. In this series, the Juárez Cartel is led by Fausto Galvan (played by Ramón Franco), a powerful, violent and brutal Mexican drug kingpin, who does not arouse suspicion, has a store called El Rey Storage. In The Bridge, the main sicario of the Juárez Cartel is Hector Valdez (played by Arturo Del Puerto), known for his brutality against the targets of the Juarez Cartel.

== See also ==
- List of gangs in Mexico
  - Beltrán-Leyva Cartel
  - Gulf Cartel
  - Los Zetas
  - Tijuana Cartel
- Amado Carrillo Fuentes
- Vicente Carrillo Fuentes
- List of Mexico's 37 most-wanted drug lords
