= Guadalajara Cartel =

Former Mexican drug cartel

- Founded: 1978–1980
- Founded by: Miguel Ángel Félix Gallardo, Rafael Caro Quintero, Ernesto Fonseca Carrillo, Juan José Esparragoza Moreno
- Founding location: Guadalajara, Jalisco, Mexico
- Years active: 1980–1989
- Territory: Mexico: Jalisco, Tijuana, Chihuahua, Sinaloa, Nayarit, San Luis Potosí, Colima, Sonora, Zacatecas
- Ethnicity: Mexican
- Criminal activities: Drug trafficking, money laundering, extortion, murder, torture, arms trafficking and political corruption.
- Allies: Tijuana Cartel; Medellín Cartel; Cali Cartel; Norte del Valle Cartel; Sinaloa Cartel; Juárez Cartel; Sonora Cartel
- Rivals: Gulf Cartel; DEA

The Guadalajara Cartel (Spanish: Cártel de Guadalajara), also known as The Federation (Spanish: La Federación), was a Mexican drug cartel which was formed in the late 1970s by Miguel Ángel Félix Gallardo, Rafael Caro Quintero, and Ernesto Fonseca Carrillo in order to ship cocaine and marijuana to the United States. Among the first of the Mexican drug trafficking groups to work with the Colombian cocaine mafias, the Guadalajara Cartel prospered from the cocaine trade. Throughout the 1980s, the cartel controlled much of the drug trafficking in Mexico and the corridors along the Mexico–United States border. It had operations in various regions in Mexico which included the states of Jalisco, Baja California, Colima, Sonora, Chihuahua and Sinaloa among others. Multiple modern present day drug cartels (or their remnants) such as the Tijuana, Juárez and Sinaloa cartels originally started out as branches or "plazas" of the Guadalajara Cartel before its eventual disintegration.

== History and legacy ==
Miguel Ángel Félix Gallardo, a former federal police officer, started working for drug traffickers brokering corruption of state officials and his partners in the cartel, Rafael Caro Quintero and Ernesto Fonseca Carrillo ("Don Neto"), who previously worked in the Avilés criminal organization, took control of the trafficking routes after Avilés was killed in a shootout with MFJP police officers. It is believed Avilés was set up by Fonseca, the gang's treasurer. After the implementation of "Operation Condor" (Spanish: Operación Cóndor), a Mexican antidrug program carried out in the 1970s to stop the flow of drugs from Mexico to the United States, many drug traffickers from the state of Sinaloa regrouped in Guadalajara, Jalisco, to continue their operations. The regrouping led to the formation of the Guadalajara Cartel which would take place some time in 1980. The cartel eventually managed to control nearly all the narcotics trafficking operations in Mexico throughout the 1980s.

Major marijuana plantations began to spring up beginning in the early 1980s. Earlier plantations were usually located in remote mountain areas where they were hard to spot and irrigation did not require drilling wells. Yields were relatively low, quality varied, and transportation was expensive. These new plantations however were seeded with an improved variety of marijuana, originally developed by American cannabis cultivators from California and Oregon, this new variety came to be referred to by Mexican cultivators as "sinsemilla" (meaning seedless) marking the first time growing marijuana without seeds was brought to a grand-scale. This more powerful, higher quality variety brought much higher prices in North American markets. Seedless marijuana is known to come from female cannabis plants which have not been pollinated by male plants. Therefore, the plant puts more energy into fostering psychoactive cannabinoids like THC instead of putting its energy towards producing seeds.

These new plantations were located in remote desert areas, where transportation was much less expensive but additionally, faced several new problems. Desert production required well drilling for irrigation, and Mexico had strict laws governing well digging, a problem that was eventually solved by massive bribery. It was also easier to spot plantations in the barren deserts; the larger the farm, the easier to spot. With an end to solo American overflights as part of the eradication program, however, money and intimidation allowed farms to grow dramatically without coming to official notice.

Throughout most of the 1970s and early 1980s, a majority of the cocaine that was smuggled to the United States was trafficked by the Colombian drug cartels through Florida and the Caribbean Sea. However, with increased law enforcement measures in these areas by the mid-1980s, the Colombian drug kingpins shifted their operations to Mexico. Juan Matta-Ballesteros was the Guadalajara Cartel's primary connection to the Colombian cocaine cartels. Matta had originally introduced Felix Gallardo's predecessor, Alberto Sicilia-Falcon to Santiago Ocampo of the Cali Cartel, one of the largest Colombian drug cartels. The Guadalajara Cartel managed to traffic cocaine to the U.S. in multi-ton shipments each month. Rather than taking cash payments for their services, the smugglers in the Guadalajara Cartel took a 50% cut of the cocaine they transported from Colombia. This was extremely profitable for them, with some estimating that the trafficking network, then operated by Felix Gallardo, Ernesto Fonseca Carrillo, and Rafael Quintero was pulling in $5 billion annually. According to some writers, like Peter Dale Scott, the organization prospered largely because it enjoyed the protection of the Mexican DFS intelligence agency, under its chief Miguel Nazar Haro. Several of the agency's members were involved in organized crime directly by actively participating in murder and drug trafficking on the cartel's behalf.

The Guadalajara Cartel however suffered a major blow in 1985 when the group's co-founder Rafael Caro Quintero was captured, and later convicted, for the torture and murder of American DEA agent Enrique Camarena. Camarena was an undercover field agent who the cartel suspected of giving information to the DEA which led to destruction of the organization's 2,500 acre marijuana crop known as Rancho Búfalo (English: "Buffalo Ranch") in the state of Chihuahua during November 1984. The authorities reportedly burned more than 10,000 tons of marijuana – totaling a loss of around $160 million. This allegedly prompted Caro Quintero and other high-ranking members of the Guadalajara Cartel to seek revenge against the DEA and Camarena. In retribution, Camarena and his pilot Alfredo Zavala Avelar were kidnapped in Guadalajara on February 7, 1985, in broad daylight by several DFS officers, taken to a residence owned by Quintero located at 881 Lope de Vega in the colonia of Jardines del Bosque, in the western section of the city, brutally tortured, and murdered.

Camarena was interrogated and tortured to gain information regarding his knowledge of law enforcement operations directed against the cartel; as well as any information that the DEA may have on Mexican politicians involved in drug trafficking. Over the course of the 30 plus hour torture session, Camarena's skull, jaw, nose, cheekbones, windpipe, and ribs were broken; the kidnappers brought in a doctor to administer drugs to the agent to keep him conscious throughout the whole session. The kidnappers made audio recordings of some parts of Camarena's interrogation. The final blow was apparently done when the torturers crushed his skull with a piece of rebar or other similar piece of metal. About a month later, Camarena and Zavala's corpses were taken to the neighboring state of Michoacán and dumped in a roadside ditch to be discovered on 5 March 1985. Caro Quintero then left Mexico on March 9, 1985, with his associates and his girlfriend Sara Cristina Cosío Gaona. Former Mexican Judicial Police chief Armando Pavón Reyes, after receiving a $300,000 bribe, reportedly allowed Caro Quintero to flee from the airport in Guadalajara, in a private jet, to seek refuge in Costa Rica. The police chief was fired shortly afterward, and was charged with bribery and complicity in the Camarena murder.

It was also alleged that Caro Quintero, in just eight days prior to Camarena's kidnapping had ordered the abduction, torture, and murder of writer John Clay Walker and dentistry student Albert Radelat on January 30, 1985. According to the allegations, the two Americans were dining in a Guadalajara restaurant when they encountered Caro Quintero and his men as they accidentally walked into one of Quintero's private parties. Caro Quintero was said to have then ordered his men to seize the Americans and take them to a store room, where they were tortured with ice picks and interrogated. John Walker died on the scene from blunt force trauma to the head. Albert Radelat was still alive when he was wrapped in tablecloths, taken to a park near the city, and buried. The men's bodies were found six months later buried at the San Isidro Mazatepec Park in Zapopan. The authorities believe that Caro Quintero had mistaken Walker and Radelat for U.S. undercover agents.

The murder of agent Camarena outraged the U.S. government and put pressure on Mexico to arrest all the major players involved in the incident, resulting in a four-year law enforcement manhunt that brought down several leaders of the Guadalajara Cartel. The U.S. applied heavy political pressure to the Mexican government throughout the investigation, going as far as to close several U.S.-Mexican port of entries for a period of several days. After the arrest of Rafael Caro Quintero and Ernesto Fonseca Carrillo in April 1985 for the Camarena murder, Félix Gallardo kept a low profile and in 1987 he moved with his family to Guadalajara city. Félix "The Godfather" Gallardo then decided to divide up the trade he controlled as it would be more efficient and less likely to be brought down in one law enforcement swoop. In a way, he was privatizing the Mexican drug business while sending it back underground, to be run by bosses who were less well known or not yet known by the DEA. Félix Gallardo convened the nation's top drug narcos at a house in the resort city of Acapulco where he designated the plazas (turfs) or territories. Different drug lords were given a certain region where they could traffic drugs to the U.S. and tax smugglers that wished to move merchandise on their turf. The Tijuana route would go to his nephews, the Arellano Félix brothers. The Ciudad Juárez route would go to the Carrillo Fuentes family, headed by the nephew of Fonseca Carrillo, Amado Carrillo Fuentes. Miguel Caro Quintero would run the Sonora corridor. Control of the Matamoros, Tamaulipas corridor – then becoming the Gulf Cartel - would be left undisturbed to Juan García Ábrego. Meanwhile, Joaquín "El Chapo" Guzmán Loera and Ismael Zambada García would take over Pacific coast operations, becoming the Sinaloa Cartel. Guzmán and Zambada brought veteran Héctor Luis Palma Salazar back into the fold. Félix Gallardo still planned to oversee national operations, he had the contacts so he was still the top man, but he would no longer control all details of the business; he was arrested on April 8, 1989.

It is also believed that Amado Carrillo Fuentes was once a part of the Guadalajara Cartel, but he was sent to Ojinaga, Chihuahua to oversee the cocaine shipments of his uncle, Ernesto Fonseca Carrillo, and to learn about border operations from Pablo Acosta Villarreal, "El Zorro de Ojinaga" (The Ojinaga Fox). Amado was a long-time socio, or partner of Acosta. During the mid and late 1980s Amado accompanied Pablo Acosta, Marco DeHaro and Becky Garcia on many of their smuggling activities, including the "rescue" of a broken-down marijuana truck near Lomas de Arena. Through a protection scheme with the Mexican federal and state police agencies and with the Mexican army, Acosta was able to ensure the security for five tons of cocaine being flown by turboprop every month from Colombia to Ojinaga, sometimes landing at the municipal airport, sometimes at dirt airstrips on ranches upriver from Ojinaga. Traditionally, Acosta would mostly smuggle marijuana and heroin but towards the end of his life focused more on cocaine. Once Pablo Acosta was killed in 1987 during a joint cross-border raid by the FBI and Mexican Federal Police in the Rio Grande village of Santa Elena (Chihuahua), and Carillo's other successor Rafael Aguilar Guajardo was murdered by Amado Carrillo himself in 1993 in Cancún, Amado Carrillo Fuentes then took over complete control of the Juárez Cartel.

In 1989, Amado was jailed for several weeks in Mexico. By then, he had undergone plastic surgery already at least once to alter his appearance.

At present, these aforementioned cartels/factions, or remnants of them, are battling each other for control of trafficking routes, influence over the Mexican government, and in retaliation for past offenses and betrayals. This conflict is known as the Mexican drug war.

== See also ==
- Mexican drug war
- Narcos: Mexico
