= Juan José Esparragoza Moreno =

Mexican drug trafficker (1949–2014)

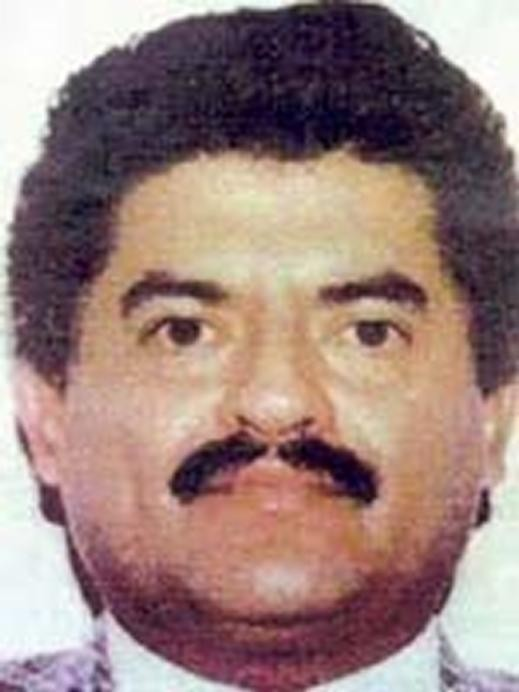
- Born: 3 February 1949; Huixiopa, Badiraguato, Sinaloa, Mexico
- Died: 7 June 2014 (unconfirmed); Mexico
- Other names: Aliases: El Azul; Juan Robles; El Huarache; Juan Robledo; Arturo Beltrán; Raúl González; José Luis Esparragosa; Juan Esparragosa Ualino; Juan Manuel Ortiz Moreno; Juan José Esparraguza Valino; Juan José Esparragoza Italino; Juan José Esparragoza Martínez
- Occupation: Co-founder of the Sinaloa Cartel
- Height: 1.73 m (5 ft 8 in)
- Spouse: Gloria Monzón
- Status: Deceased
- Reward amount: Mexico: $30 million Mexican pesos USA: $5 million USD
- Accomplice: Ismael Zambada García

Juan José Esparragoza Moreno (3 February 1949 – c. June 2014), commonly referred to by his alias El Azul (lit. 'The Blue One'), was a Mexican drug lord and co-founder of the Sinaloa Cartel, a drug trafficking organization. Originally a member of the Dirección Federal de Seguridad (DFS) police agency, he founded the Guadalajara Cartel in the 1970s along with other drug kingpins in Mexico. Following its disintegration in the late 1980s, he went on to lead the Juárez Cartel and eventually settled in the Sinaloa Cartel. He worked alongside fellow drug lord El Chapo.

== Early life ==
Juan José Esparragoza Moreno was born in Huixiopa, Badiraguato, Sinaloa, on 3 February 1949. (Note: His hometown Huichiopa is sometimes written as Huixiopa or Chuicopa.) He has an alternative date of birth on 2 March 1949 listed on the United States government databases. In the 1970s, he joined the Dirección Federal de Seguridad (DFS), a now-extinct Mexican federal police agency, where he befriended police commanders involved in organized crime. Esparragoza Moreno's nickname, "El Azul" (English: "The Blue One"), derives from his complexion. He is said to be "so dark that his skin appears to be blue".

== Guadalajara Cartel ==
After the implementation of Operation Condor (Spanish: Operación Cóndor), a Mexican antidrug program carried out in the 1970s to stop the flow of drugs from Mexico to the United States, many drug traffickers from the state of Sinaloa regrouped in Guadalajara, Jalisco, to continue their operations. The regrouping led to the formation of the Guadalajara Cartel, a drug trafficking organization that eventually managed to control nearly all the narcotics trafficking operations in Mexico throughout the late 1970s and 1980s. Among their original founders were Miguel Ángel Félix Gallardo (alias "El Padrino"), Ernesto Fonseca Carrillo (alias "Don Neto"), Rafael Caro Quintero (alias "Rafa"), Esparragoza Moreno, and other Sinaloan drug kingpins. Throughout most of the 1970s and early 1980s, most of the cocaine that was smuggled to the United States was trafficked by the Colombian drug cartels through Florida and the Caribbean Sea. However, with increased law enforcement measures in these areas by the mid-1980s, the Colombian drug kingpins shifted their operations to Mexico.

The Guadalajara Cartel took advantage of this opportunity and began supplying cocaine for the Colombian groups across the U.S–Mexico border. But instead of simply acting as smugglers, the cartel leaders decided to take a share of the cocaine profits for themselves (the shares were often as high as 50%). Under their leadership, the Guadalajara Cartel initially oversaw the production and distribution of marijuana and opium poppies to the United States; by the 1980s, the cartel began to expand its operations and include cocaine in its repertoire. The Guadalajara Cartel managed to traffic cocaine to the U.S. in multi-ton shipments each month, and their leaders reportedly amassed a fortune. At the same time, the cartel enjoyed a level of protection through the DFS police agency; several of its members were involved in organized crime directly by actively participating in murder and drug trafficking on the cartel's behalf.

With the growing influence of the Guadalajara Cartel, the Drug Enforcement Administration (DEA) started to conduct covert operations in Mexico. One of its special agents, Enrique Camarena Salazar, was sent to the DEA offices in Guadalajara and started to work undercover by infiltrating the Guadalajara Cartel. During his tenure in Guadalajara, Camarena uncovered what seemed to be a never ending field of marijuana. In November 1984, Camarena directed Mexican authorities to a 220 acres (0.89 km^{2}) marijuana plantation in Chihuahua known as Rancho Búfalo (English: "Buffalo Ranch"), which was owned by the Guadalajara Cartel. Upon their arrival, the Mexican soldiers destroyed tons in marijuana valuing in over US$8 billion. The raid resulted in a major financial blow for the Guadalajara Cartel, and its leaders vowed to retaliate against those responsible for directing the Mexican government to the location.

=== Kidnapping, torture, and murder of Camarena ===
In broad daylight on 7 February 1985, several DFS police officers kidnapped Camarena as he left the U.S. consulate in Guadalajara. A few hours after the incident, his pilot Alfredo Zavala Avelar, who had conducted operations for the DEA alongside Camarena, was abducted. Camarena was taken to a home at 881 Lope de Vega in Guadalajara, where he was tortured to gain information regarding his knowledge of law enforcement operations directed against the Guadalajara Cartel; as well as any information that the DEA may have on Mexican politicians involved in drug trafficking. Over the course of the 30 plus hour torture session, Camarena's skull, jaw, nose, cheekbones, windpipe, and ribs were broken; the kidnappers brought in a doctor to administer drugs to the agent to keep him conscious throughout the whole session. The kidnappers made audio recordings of some parts of Camarena's interrogation. The final blow was apparently done when the torturers crushed his skull with a piece of rebar or other similar piece of metal. About a month later, Camarena and Zavala's corpses were taken to the neighboring state of Michoacán and dumped in a roadside ditch to be discovered on 5 March 1985.

Camarena's murder outraged the U.S. government and put pressure on Mexico to arrest all the major players involved in the incident, resulting in a four-year law enforcement manhunt that brought down several leaders of the Guadalajara Cartel. Caro Quintero was arrested in Costa Rica on 4 April 1985 after fleeing Mexico; on 7 April 1985, Fonseca Carrillo was nabbed by the Mexican police in Jalisco; in March 1986, authorities arrested Esparragoza Moreno in Mexico City under the direction of the DFS police commander Florentino Ventura. He was imprisoned at the Reclusorio Sur penitentiary in Mexico City on 11 March 1986 for drug trafficking charges and for his alleged participation in the murder of Camarena. Esparragoza Moreno did not admit to the charges against him and said that he was innocent. A federal judge, however, sentenced him to seven years and two months behind bars. On 9 July 1990, he was transferred to another prison in Mexico City, and in March 1992 he was moved to the Federal Social Readaptation Center No. 1 (known simply as "La Palma") in Almoloya de Juárez, State of Mexico. A year later, Esparragoza Moreno fulfilled his sentence and was released from prison.

While Esparragoza Moreno was in prison, Félix Gallardo was arrested at his home in Guadalajara in April 1989. In efforts to keep the drug trade in Mexico working while he was behind bars, Félix Gallardo called for an organized crime summit in Acapulco, Guerrero. At the meeting, those present agreed to dismantle the Guadalajara Cartel and divide its territories among themselves. Each drug lord was given a certain region where they could traffic drugs to the U.S. and tax smugglers that wished to move merchandise on their turf. The Arellano Félix brothers and other drug traffickers formed the Tijuana Cartel, which controlled the Tijuana corridor and parts of Baja California; in Chihuahua, a group controlled by the Carrillo Fuentes family formed the Juárez Cartel; and the remaining faction left to Sinaloa and the Pacific Coast and formed the Sinaloa Cartel under the traffickers Ismael "El Mayo" Zambada, Héctor "El Güero" Palma, and Joaquín "El Chapo" Guzmán. When Esparragoza Moreno became a free man, he joined the forces of the Juárez Cartel.

== Juárez Cartel ==
In 1993, Esparragoza Moreno joined the forces of the Juárez Cartel under the tutelage of the cartel's leader Amado Carrillo Fuentes (alias "El Señor de los Cielos"), a top drug baron in Mexico. During Esparragoza Moreno's tenure under Carrillo Fuentes, the Juárez Cartel used sophisticated technology, such as large aircraft, to smuggle narcotics, including marijuana, cocaine, heroin, and methamphetamine, from Mexico to the U.S. The cartel had an important business relationship with the Cali Cartel in Colombia, and owned a number of storage places along the U.S.–Mexico border that were used to hide their merchandise before it was smuggled. The cartel's connection with Mexico's justice system was reportedly well-established too; it is believed that the former Mexican Army General José de Jesús Gutiérrez Rebollo protected the Juárez Cartel until he was incarcerated for drug trafficking offenses in 1997. In addition, during the 1990s, the Juárez Cartel reportedly spent between US$20 and US$30 million financing each of their smuggling networks, and generated millions more a week from drug proceeds. Through a large network spread across the U.S., the Juárez Cartel recruited gang members to move the drugs for them across urban areas including Los Angeles, San Diego, San Francisco, Houston, Denver, Phoenix, and New York City.

In the cartel, Esparragoza Moreno initially worked as the operational chief and later became the second-in-command, just behind Carrillo Fuentes. He was also a business partner with the imprisoned drug lord Juan José Quintero Payán (alias "Don Juanjo"), one of the founders of the Juárez Cartel. Esparragoza Moreno's role in the Juárez Cartel was that of a negotiator, and he was responsible for forging alliances with Peruvian and Colombian drug suppliers. He was also a dispute arbitrator within the cartel and was credited for organizing a peace agreement with the Gulf Cartel in northern Mexico. After his tenure in the Juárez Cartel, Esparragoza Moreno traditionally held leadership positions as a number-two figure, given his preference to maintain a low-profile status and avoid getting arrested or killed as the top kingpins usually do.

In an attempt to change his physical appearance and avoid detection from Mexican and U.S. law enforcement, Carrillo Fuentes decided in 1997 to undergo plastic surgery and relocate outside of Mexico. After the eight-hour-long surgery at the Santa Mónica Hospital in Mexico City, Carrillo Fuentes reportedly died of a heart attack which was caused either by an overdose of the tranquilizer Dormicum or by a defect in a respirator. With Carrillo Fuentes's leadership void open, a power struggle within the cartel ensued as their leaders and rival crime groups scrambled to take over the kingpin's empire. The natural successor was his brother Vicente Carrillo Fuentes, who appointed his brother Rodolfo, his nephew Vicente Carrillo Leyva, and others as part of his faction. Esparragoza Moreno and others within the cartel, however, disagreed with the imposition of Carrillo Fuentes as the leader.

== The Federation/Sinaloa Alliance ==
Esparragoza was linked to leadership of "The Federation", an alliance of the Sinaloa, Juárez and Sonora (Caro-Quintero Organization) cartels, during the first decade of the century.

== Bounty ==
Esparragoza Moreno is currently wanted by the United States Department of State under its Narcotics Rewards Program and is offering a US$5 million bounty. In Mexico, he is included in the list of Mexico's 37 most-wanted drug lords, and the Mexican government is offering a $2 million bounty. In its wanted-poster description, the drug lord is said to have several aliases aside from his trademark "El Azul": Juan José Esparragoza Martínez, José Luis Esparragosa, Juan Esparragosa Ualino, Juan José Esparragoza Italino, Juan José Esparraguza Valino, Juan Manuel Ortiz Moreno, Arturo Beltrán, Raúl González, Juan Robles, Juan Robledo, and El Huarache.

== Kingpin Act sanctions ==
The United States Department of the Treasury placed economic sanctions on nine entities and ten individuals linked to Esparragoza Moreno on 24 June 2012. In the statement, the United States froze the assets of the drug lord's family members, which consisted of several gas stations, a shopping center, a housing company, and other businesses. The Treasury blacklisted the ten individuals and prohibited U.S. companies from doing business with them. Six of the ten people sanctioned were family members of Esparragoza Moreno: two wives and four of his children. One of his wives, however, owned a property directly under his name. The other wife was sanctioned for owning seven gas stations on Esparragoza Moreno's behalf.

The Treasury called Esparragoza Moreno a "godfather of Mexican narcotics" who has used illicit money to build a network in the legitimate business. While other Mexican drug lords have sought for more attention, Esparragoza Moreno tried to keep a low-profile in hopes of avoiding detection. Mexican investigators, however, have expressed their frustrations in the announcements the United States makes on the kingpin act designations, because they say that U.S. officials do not provide the evidence necessary to prosecute the drug lords and their associates in Mexican courts.

Alejandra Araujo Uriarte, his mother-in-law, was blacklisted by the U.S. Treasury in December 2014 for allegedly having had concealed assets owned by Esparragoza Moreno. She was blacklisted because authorities believe that after the drug lord's family members were sanctioned, his wife began money laundering through her bank accounts.

== Alleged death ==
On 7 June 2014, Esparragoza Moreno reportedly died of a heart attack at the age of 65, apparently following a car accident he had suffered fifteen days earlier. According to unconfirmed reports, Esparragoza Moreno was confined to a bed after injuring his vertebral column in the wreck. When he tried to get up from his bed, he suffered a heart attack and died.

Sources disagree on the exact location of his death; some state he died in Mexico City, while others suggest it may have been in Guadalajara. Esparragoza Moreno's remains were reportedly cremated and sent to Culiacán, Sinaloa, by his family members and friends.

The Mexican law enforcement and intelligence agencies, Procuraduría General de la República (PGR) and the Centro de Investigación y Seguridad Nacional (CISEN), led the investigation along with the DEA. The PGR chief Jesús Murillo Karam indicated that the Mexican government did not have sufficient evidence to confirm the rumors surrounding the drug lord's death. The mayor of Badiraguato Mario Valenzuela as well as the Governor of Sinaloa, Mario López Valdez, stated that the rumors were false.

On 11 June 2014, the CISEN, the PGR, and the Policía Ministerial revealed that they had intelligence reports indicating that Esparragoza Moreno may have died at a hospital in Culiacán (not in Guadalajara or Mexico City, as previously stated). According to those unconfirmed reports, Esparragoza Moreno was registered at the hospital under a fake name and died there from a heart attack. Before authorities had a chance to confirm his death, the investigation states, his corpse was taken from the hospital and cremated the next day. The authorities carried out similar investigations in Mexico City, Jalisco, Nuevo León, and Sinaloa, but they have not found any information to confirm or deny the rumors surrounding Esparragoza Moreno's death.

In August 2014, José Juan Esparragoza Jiménez, the son of Esparragoza Moreno, was arrested on charges of trafficking methamphetamine, cocaine, and marijuana. During his police interrogation, he stated that his father was deceased.

== FBI Wanted List ==
Esparragoza continues to appear on US government reward lists. Although he has been presumed dead since 2014, his wanted poster has not been removed, indicating that he is still considered a possible living fugitive. It is believed that he may have undergone plastic surgery.

== Media portrayals ==
In Narcos: Mexico, El Azul is portrayed by Fermín Martínez. The series falsely portrays that he was killed by the Tijuana cartel in the 1990s, in reality he died in 2014, although it is not officially confirmed.

== See also ==
- Mexican drug war
- List of Mexicans

== Bibliography ==
- Beith, Malcolm (2010). The Last Narco: Inside the Hunt for El Chapo, the World's Most Wanted Drug Lord. Grove Press. ISBN 978-0802196224.
- Bowden, Charles (2002). Down by the River: Drugs, Money, Murder, and Family. Simon and Schuster. ISBN 0684853434. "Down by the River: Drugs, Money, Murder, and Family."
- Bunker, Julie Marie (2012). Bribes, Bullets, and Intimidation: Drug Trafficking and the Law in Central America. Penn State Press. ISBN 978-0271048666.
- Campbell, Howard (2010). Drug War Zone: Frontline Dispatches from the Streets of El Paso and Juárez. University of Texas Press. ISBN 978-0292782792.
- Chepesiuk, Ron (1999). The War on Drugs: An International Encyclopedia. ABC-CLIO. ISBN 0874369851. "El Chapo Guzman."
- Cockburn, Alexander (1998). Whiteout: The CIA, Drugs, and the Press. Verso. ISBN 1859841392. "Whiteout: The CIA, Drugs, and the Press."
- Edmonds-Poli, Emily; Shirk, David A. (2009). Contemporary Mexican Politics. Rowman & Littlefield. ISBN 978-0742540491.
- González, Fernando Manuel (1996). Una historia sencilla: la muerte accidental de un cardenal (in Spanish). Plaza y Valdes. p. 201. ISBN 9688564680.
- Hernández, Anabel (2012). Los Señores del Narco (in Spanish). Random House. ISBN 978-6073108485.
- Grillo, Ioan (2012). El Narco: The Bloody Rise of Mexican Drug Cartels. Bloomsbury Publishing. ISBN 978-1408824337.
- Grayson, George W. (2011). Mexico: Narco-Violence and a Failed State?. Transaction Publishers. ISBN 978-1412815512.
- Grayson, George W. (2013). The Cartels: The Story of Mexico's Most Dangerous Criminal Organizations and Their Impact on U.S. Security. Greenwood Publishing Group. ISBN 978-1440829864.
- Katz, David S. (2003). Executive's Guide to Personal Security. John Wiley & Sons. ISBN 0471449873.
- Lyman, Michael D. (2003). Drugs in Society: Causes, Concepts and Control (6 ed.). Elsevier. ISBN 1437744516.
- McCarthy, Dennis M. P. (2011). An Economic History of Organized Crime: A National and Transnational Approach. Routledge. ISBN 978-1136705823.
- Monsiváis, Carlos (1997). Mexican Postcards. Verso. ISBN 0860916049. "enrique camarena kidnapped."
- Newton, Michael (2002). The Encyclopedia of Kidnappings. Infobase Publishing. ISBN 1438129882.
- Ochoa O'Leary, Anna (2013). Uncharted Terrains: New Directions in Border Research Methodology, Ethics, and Practice. University of Arizona Press. ISBN 978-0816530557.
- Washington Valdez, Diana (2005). Cosecha de mujeres: safari en el desierto mexicano. Peace. ISBN 9706519882.
