= Pedro Avilés Pérez =

Mexican drug lord (1931–1978)

- Born: April 11, 1931; Tamazula, Durango, Mexico
- Died: September 15, 1978 (aged 47); Culiacán, Sinaloa, Mexico
- Cause of death: Gunshot wounds
- Other names: El Leon de la Sierra, Sneaky Pete
- Occupation: Drug trafficking
- Known for: Drug lord; pioneered the use of aircraft to smuggle drugs to the United States and other crimes
- Partner(s): Miguel Ángel Félix Gallardo, Ernesto Fonseca Carrillo, Juan José Esparragoza Moreno, Rafael Caro Quintero
- Children: Atani Perez

Pedro Avilés Pérez (April 11, 1931 – September 15, 1978), also known as "El León de la Sierra" (English: "The Mountain Lion"), was a Boss Mexican drug lord in the state of Sinaloa beginning in the late 1960s.

He is considered to be among the first Boss generation of major Mexican drug smugglers of marijuana. He was also the first known drug lord to use an aircraft to smuggle drugs to the United States.

In the Netflix series Narcos: Mexico, Avilés was portrayed by actor Antonio Lopez Torres.

== Biography ==
Second-generation Sinaloan traffickers such as Rafael Caro Quintero and Ernesto Fonseca Carrillo would claim they learned all they knew about drug trafficking while serving in the Avilés organization. Killed in a shootout with the Federal Police in September 1978, some people believe Avilés was set up by Fonseca Carrillo, the cartel's treasurer. Caro Quintero, Aviles' foreman in Chihuahua, began acquiring marijuana and poppy plantations. Corruption of state officials was brokered by Miguel Ángel Félix Gallardo, an emerging capo who had spent time in Sinaloa working as a Sinaloan State Police trooper and serving as bodyguard to Leopoldo Sánchez Celis, governor of Sinaloa.
