= Güero =

Güero may refer to:

== People ==
- El Güero Gil (d. 1999), nickname for Alfredo Gil, Mexican guitarist/vocalist, co-founder of trio Los Panchos and inventor of the Requinto guitar
- El Güero Jaibo (d. 1993), aka Juan Francisco Murillo Díaz, a member of the Tijuana Cartel
- El Güero Loco, one of the many aliases of Ivan Martin, a member of the Chicano Hip-hop group, Delinquent Habits.
- El Güero Palma, nickname for Héctor Luis Palma Salazar, a Mexican drug trafficker
- White Mexicans in general

== Arts, entertainment, and media ==
- Guero (book) ("Later"), a 1643 Basque-language book by Pedro Agerre
- Guero Davila, a character in Queen of the South

=== Films ===
- El Güero Estrada (1997), Mexican film directed by Gilberto De Anda and scored by Gustavo Ramírez Reyes
- Güeros (2014), Mexican film directed by Alonso Ruizpalacios

=== Music ===
- Guero (1970), a piano study by German composer Helmut Lachenmann
- Guero (2005), an album by Beck
- Guerolito (2005), a remix album by Beck, featuring all of the songs from Guero except for the hidden track, "Send a Message to Her"
- Matando Gueros (1993), an album by the Mexican metal-band Brujeria

== Other uses ==
- Güero (restaurant), in Portland, Oregon, United States

== See also ==
- Guerou, a city in Mauritania
- Guerou (department), Mauritania
