= Caro Quintero =

This name may refer to one of two people:

- Rafael Caro Quintero, Mexican drug lord
- Miguel Caro Quintero, Mexican drug lord
