= Ramon Torres Mendez =

Mexican American hitman (1969–1993)

- Born: July 2, 1969; San Diego, California
- Died: September 1993 (aged 24); Guadalajara, Jalisco, Mexico.
- Cause of death: Killed in Mexican prison
- Other name: Spooky.
- Occupations: Auto mechanic, hitman
- Employer(s): 30th Street gang and Tijuana Cartel Hitman

Ramon Torres Mendez (July 2, 1969 – September 1993) was a Mexican American who was a high-ranking member of the Logan Heights Gang, recruited by David "D" Barron in 1993. He reportedly served as a hitman to its leaders who trained him to carry out an assassination attempt against the Tijuana Cartel major rival Joaquín Guzmán Loera.

On May 24, 1993, he and other Logan Heights Gang members were assigned to kill Joaquín Guzmán Loera at the Guadalajara Airport but in the shoot-out that followed, six bystanders were killed, including the Roman Catholic Cardinal Juan Jesus Posadas Ocampo. Mendez was arrested in late June 1993.

== Death ==
In September 1993, Mendez was killed inside a Mexican prison by other inmates while awaiting trial for murder.
