= Logan Heights Gang =

Street gang in San Diego, California

- Founded: 1970s
- Founding location: Logan Heights, San Diego, California, United States
- Years active: 1970s–present
- Territory: Southeast San Diego
- Ethnicity: Primarily Chicano (Mexican American)
- Activities: Drug trafficking, murder, kidnapping, human smuggling
- Allies: Mexican Mafia; Sureños; Tijuana Cartel; 18th Street gang
- Rivals: Norteños; Sinaloa Cartel; Jalisco New Generation Cartel; MS-13; Latin Kings
- Notable members: David Barron Corona; Ramon Torres Mendez

The Logan Heights Gang, also known as Varrio Logan Heights or LH, is a Sureño street gang based in Southeast San Diego.

== History ==
The Logan Heights Gang was established in Southeast San Diego, when several individual Mexican-American street gangs from the neighborhoods of Barrio Logan, Logan Heights, and Memorial unified. The gangs date back to car clubs in the 1970s. Currently the gang is composed of four main subsets (Red Steps, 30th Street, 33rd Street, Logan Heights 13) that operate within these neighborhoods. There is also a small subset called Logan Heights Clicka that operates within the Colina del Sol neighborhood of the City Heights district in San Diego.

Although they are based in San Diego, the influence of the gang has spread to other cities in the United States (Los Angeles, Las Vegas, Denver, Minneapolis, and Lakewood, Washington) and Tijuana, Mexico. Membership is not restricted to Mexican-Americans, and the gang has included Mexican nationals, members from other Hispanic cultures, and Native Americans.

== Allies ==
The Logan Heights Gang has been an ally to the Tijuana Cartel (also known as the Arellano-Félix Organization) over the Tijuana smuggling route to the border city of San Diego, California. This alliance began on November 8, 1992, when Héctor Palma Salazar ("Guero"), struck out against the Tijuana Cartel at a disco in Puerto Vallarta, Jalisco. Although eight Tijuana Cartel members were killed in the shootout, the Arellano-Félix brothers successfully escaped from the location with the assistance of Logan Heights gangster David "D" Barron.

In retaliation, Tijuana Cartel, with the LHG as their hired gunmen, attempted to set up Guero's partner, Mexican drug lord Joaquín "El Chapo" Guzmán Loera, at Guadalajara Airport on May 24, 1993. In the ensuing shootout, the LHG killed six civilians.

Among the casualties was the Roman Catholic Cardinal Juan Jesús Posadas Ocampo. The church hierarchy originally believed Posadas had been targeted as revenge for his strong stance against the drug trade. However, Mexican officials believe Posadas just happened to be caught in cross fire. The Cardinal had arrived at the airport in a white Mercury Grand Marquis town car, known to be popular amongst drug barons, making it a target. Intelligence received by Logan Heights gang leader David "D" Barron was that Guzmán would be arriving in a white Mercury Grand Marquis town car. This explanation, however, is often countered due to Ocampo's having been wearing a long black cassock and large pectoral cross, as well as his having shared no similarity in appearance with Guzmán, and Ocampo's having been gunned down from only two feet away.

The Logan Heights Gang also has close ties to the Mexican Mafia.

== Enemies ==
Enemies of the gang include several San Diego County gangs (most notably Barrio Sherman, Varrio Shelltown, and Old Town National City), and Los Angeles gangs from Van Nuys and North Hollywood.

== In popular culture ==
In 2010, Logan Heights along with nearby Southeast San Diego neighborhood, Lincoln Park, was featured on The History Channel's Gangland television series. The show documented the Logan Heights Gang in the Season 6 episode titled "The Assassins," which first aired on February 19, 2010.

The gang, its ties to the cartel, and many of the above-mentioned events are depicted in the 2017 Netflix and Univision series El Chapo and season three of the Netflix series Narcos: Mexico.

== See also ==
- Mexican Mafia
- Tijuana Cartel
