= John Clay Walker =

American journalist who was murdered in Mexico

- Born: October 5, 1948; Washington D.C., United States
- Died: January 30, 1985 (aged 36); Guadalajara, Mexico
- Burial place: Fort Snelling National Cemetery
- Education: University of Minnesota
- Occupation: Journalist
- Spouse: Eve Walker
- Military career
- Allegiance: United States
- Branch: United States Marine Corps
- Service years: 1968–1970s
- Conflicts: Vietnam War
- Awards: 2 Purple Hearts

John Clay Walker (October 5, 1948 – January 30, 1985) was an American journalist and aspiring novelist who was abducted, tortured and murdered in Mexico by members of the Guadalajara Cartel under orders of their leader Rafael Caro Quintero. Caro Quintero suspected Walker of working as an undercover U.S. Drug Enforcement Agent (DEA) while he lived in Guadalajara, Jalisco.

== Early life and career ==
John Clay Walker was born in Washington D.C. at Walter Reed Hospital. In 1968, Walker enlisted in the United States Marine Corps. He was honorably discharged after being wounded twice in Vietnam, for which he received two Purple Hearts. Taking advantage of the G.I. Bill, Walker attended the University of Minnesota and earned a B.A. in journalism in 1976. Throughout the late 1970s and early 1980s, Walker worked as a reporter and photographer at small papers in Minnesota and Iowa. In 1983, Walker and his family relocated to Guadalajara, Mexico for a sabbatical year so that Walker could pursue a career as a novelist full-time.

On January 30, 1985, John Walker and his friend Albert Radelat were planning on going to dinner at a Guadalajara restaurant when they accidentally walked into one of Rafael Caro Quintero's private parties. The two Americans were mistaken for DEA agents and taken to a store room. There they were interrogated and tortured with ice picks. Walker died on the scene from blunt force trauma to the head. Radelat was still alive when the men were wrapped in table cloths and taken to the San Isidro Mazatepec Park in Zapopan and buried. The bodies of the men were found six months later. The authorities believe that Caro Quintero had mistaken Walker and Radelat for U.S. undercover agents. Walker is survived by his wife and two daughters. He is buried at Ft. Snelling National Cemetery in Minneapolis, Minnesota.

== In popular culture ==
Walker was portrayed in the series Narcos: Mexico by Brian Buckley. His murder is depicted in the 7th episode, "Jefe de Jefes".

== See also ==
- Mexican drug war
- List of journalists killed in Mexico
