= David Barron Corona =

Mexican gangster (1963–1997)

- Born: 1963; Tijuana, Baja California, Mexico
- Died: November 27, 1997 (aged 33-34); Tijuana, Baja California, Mexico
- Cause of death: Gunshot wound
- Other names: D, Charlie, El Junior, Charles Bronson
- Occupations: Gang member, Tijuana Cartel hitman
- Allegiance: Logan Heights Gang, Mexican Mafia, and the Tijuana Cartel
- Conviction: PC 187- Murder

David Barron Corona (1963 – November 27, 1997) was a Mexican-American gangster who was a high-ranking member of the Logan Heights Gang and the Mexican Mafia, and a hitman for the Tijuana Cartel under the command of drug lord Ramón Arellano Félix. Barron recruited and led a band of Mexican-American Logan Heights gang members as hired enforcers for the Arellano-Felix organization.

== Background ==
David Barron Corona, a.k.a. "Popeye", was a member of the Barrio Logan Heights gang and later the Mexican Mafia ("La Eme") prison gang who committed his first murder at the age of 16, killing a man who was sitting on Barron Corona's car. Convicted of murder, Barron Corona was sent to prison being released in the mid 1980s. Returned to prison on weapons charges in 1987, he was incarcerated with the brother of Arturo Everardo Páez Martínez, alias "El Kitty", a member of the Tijuana Cartel who first introduced him to the organization.

In 1989, he got out of prison and soon thereafter began working as a bodyguard and hitman for the Arellano-Félix brothers of the Tijuana Cartel (AFO). While in Mexico, he was trained in paramilitary tactics by the Tijuana Cartel, which included heavy weapons training. This training helped to make Barron Corona highly proficient in the crimes of kidnapping and murder. Barron successfully recruited dozens of San Diego gang members to cross the border to work for him and the AFO as kidnappers and hitmen. Barron was personally recruited when the Tijuana Cartel were waging a war with their hated rivals, the Sinaloa Cartel, led by Joaquin "Chapo" Guzman. The beef stemmed from who would control the drug smuggling routes from Tijuana to the border city of San Diego, California.

On November 8, 1992, the rival Sinaloa Cartel struck out against the Tijuana Cartel at the discotec "Christine" in Puerto Vallarta, Jalisco, Mexico. Eight Tijuana Cartel members were killed in the shootout but the Arellano-Félix brothers successfully escaped from the location with the assistance of Barron.

In retaliation, the Tijuana Cartel, with the assistance of Barron Corona, attempted to set up Guzmán at a Guadalajara airport on May 24, 1993. In the shootout that followed, six civilians were killed by the hired gunmen from the Logan Heights Gang. The deaths included that of Roman Catholic Cardinal Juan Jesús Posadas Ocampo. The Catholic hierarchy claimed Posadas Ocampo was targeted as revenge for his strong stance against the drug trade. Mexican officials, however, posited that the prelate was a victim of mistaken identity. The Cardinal arrived at the airport in a white Mercury Grand Marquis town car, known to be popular among drug barons, making it a possible target. Intelligence received by Barron was that Guzmán would be arriving in a white Mercury Grand Marquis town car. This claim is often met with skepticism due to Posadas Ocampo's long black cassock and large pectoral cross, as well as his dissimilar appearance to Guzmán and the fact he was gunned down from only two feet away.

Barron Corona was killed on November 27, 1997, in Tijuana, Baja California, during the attempted assassination of journalist Jesus Blancornelas. It is believed a bullet fired by one of his own henchmen ("friendly fire") ricocheted into Barron's eye, thus killing him instantly.

== In popular culture ==
Corona is played by Bobby Soto in seasons 2-3 of the Netflix show Narcos: Mexico.
