= Pablo Acosta Villarreal =

Juárez Cartel trafficker

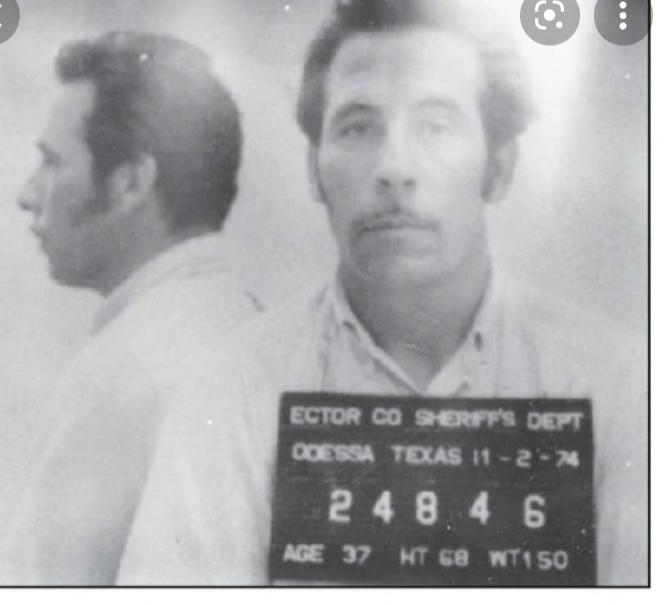
- Mugshot of Pablo Acosta Villarreal in Texas (1974)
- Born: January 26, 1937; Manuel Benavides, Chihuahua, Mexico
- Died: April 24, 1987 (aged 50); Santa Elena, Manuel Benavides, Chihuahua
- Cause of death: Shootout with Mexican Federal Police
- Other name: El Zorro de Ojinaga
- Occupation: Drug lord
- Employer: Juárez Cartel
- Known for: Drug trafficker
- Title: Leader
- Successor: Rafael Aguilar Guajardo
- Spouse: Olivia Baeza Carrasco
- Partner: Amado Carrillo Fuentes

Pablo Acosta Villarreal, commonly referred to as El Zorro de Ojinaga ("The Ojinaga Fox"; 1937-1987) was a Mexican narcotics smuggler who controlled crime along a 200-mile stretch of U.S.-Mexico border. At the height of his power, he was smuggling 60 tons of cocaine per year for Colombian cartels in addition to the large quantities of marijuana and heroin that were the mainstay of his business. He was the mentor and business partner of Amado Carrillo Fuentes, the "Lord of the Skies", who took over after Acosta's death.

He made his operation base in the border town of Ojinaga, Chihuahua, Mexico, and had his greatest power in the period around 1984–1986. Through a protection scheme with Mexican federal and state police agencies and with the Mexican army, Acosta was able to ensure the security for five tons of cocaine being flown by turboprop aircraft every month from Colombia to Ojinaga — sometimes landing at the municipal airport, sometimes at dirt airstrips on ranches upriver from Ojinaga.

Chains of luxurious restaurants and hotels laundered his drug money. While at first he managed only marijuana and heroin, Acosta became increasingly involved in the cocaine trade near the end of his life. He established contacts with Colombians who wanted to smuggle cocaine into the United States using the same routes to Texas Acosta was using to ship marijuana and heroin from across the border in Chihuahua.

Acosta was killed in April 1987, during a cross-border raid into the Rio Grande village of Santa Elena, Chihuahua, by Mexican Federal Police helicopters, with assistance from the FBI. Rafael Aguilar Guajardo took Acosta's place but he was killed soon after by Amado Carrillo Fuentes, who took control of the organization. The book Drug Lord by investigative journalist Terrence Poppa, chronicles the rise and fall of Acosta through direct interviews he did with the drug lord.

== Personal life and links in the US ==
In the 1980s, Pablo Acosta met a wealthy Texan woman named Mimi Webb Miller, niece of former United States senator John G. Tower. Mimi ran horseback tours in the area, bought a ranch in Mexico and later started a romantic relation with Acosta that lasted until he died. She describes him as a "strong guy, with a lot of charisma” that was also "kind and conscientious" and that he helped her to obtain permissions to cross the border with her horseback trips. After Acosta's death, she was warned by Sheriff Rick Thompson of Presidio County that there was a price on her head, because she knew too much; 4 years later, Thompson was charged and sentenced to life for smuggling $48 million of cocaine, which was later reduced to 30 years. Thompson was associated with a local outlaw named Glyn Robert Chambers, a violent man long suspected of drug trafficking with contacts in Mexico, who had been a trafficker for at least 10 years. Chambers had a ranch in south Presidio County, just across the border from Ojinaga, the turf of Pablo Acosta. According to the DEA, Thompson helped Chambers smuggle more than 20 tons of cocaine and marijuana. After Chambers was arrested by the DEA, he made a deal to testify against Thompson.

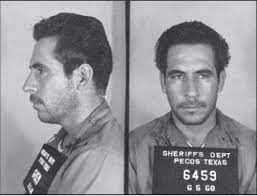
Mugshot of 31 year old Pablo Acosta in 1968, in Texas

== In popular culture ==
There is a popular rumor in Mexico that states that he was an informant for the US government on communism and guerrilla movements near the Mexico-US border. As narrated by the famous Mexican-folk (norteño) group Los Tigres del Norte, in the drug-ballad (narco-corrido) called "El Zorro de Ojinaga", written by Paulino Vargas, that narrates some of the exploits of Acosta.

Acosta is alluded to in Cormac McCarthy's novel No Country for Old Men.

Acosta is portrayed in Narcos: Mexico by Gerardo Taracena.

== See also ==
- List of Mexican drug cartel figures
