= Juan Jesús Posadas Ocampo =

Mexican Catholic bishop (1926–1993)

His Eminence Juan Jesús Posadas Ocampo
- Cardinal, Archbishop of Guadalajara
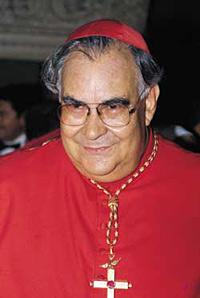
- Church: Latin Church
- Archdiocese: Guadalajara
- Term ended: 24 May 1993
- Predecessor: José Salazar López
- Successor: Juan Sandoval Íñiguez
- Other post: Cardinal-Priest of Nostra Signora di Guadalupe e San Filippo Martire
- Previous posts: Bishop of Tijuana (1970-1982); Bishop of Cuernavaca (1982-1987)

Orders
- Ordination: 23 September 1950
- Consecration: 14 June 1970
- Created cardinal: 28 June 1991 by John Paul II
- Rank: Cardinal-Priest

Personal details
- Born: 10 November 1926 Salvatierra, Guanajuato, Mexico
- Died: 24 May 1993 (aged 66) Guadalajara, Jalisco, Mexico

Juan Jesús Posadas Ocampo (11 November 1926 – 24 May 1993) was an archbishop of the Catholic Church in Mexico who served as the eighth archbishop of the see of Guadalajara and as a cardinal of the Catholic Church.

Posadas Ocampo was elevated to the cardinalate by Pope John Paul II on the consistory of 28 June 1991.

On 24 May 1993, Cardinal Posadas was murdered, struck by 14 bullets during a shootout at Miguel Hidalgo y Costilla Guadalajara International Airport. Officially, Mexican-American sicarios were carrying out a contract killing for the Tijuana Cartel when Cardinal Posadas was allegedly mistaken for rival Sinaloa Cartel drug lord Joaquín "El Chapo" Guzmán. Allegations have continued to be investigated, however, that the Cardinal was actually murdered by the Mexican Government in order to cover up collusion between Mexican drug cartels and human trafficking rings and senior politicians during Mexico's 90-year long government of the Institutional Revolutionary Party (PRI).

== Death ==
On 24 May 1993, Posadas Ocampo, along with six other people, were killed in the parking lot of Guadalajara International Airport. He was inside his car and received 14 gunshots. A government inquiry concluded he was caught in a shootout between rival cocaine cartels and was mistakenly identified as a drug lord. According to a cable of the Defense Intelligence Agency, the cardinal was mistaken for Joaquín Guzmán Loera, "El Chapo", the head of the Sinaloa Cartel. No one was ever punished for the slaying itself, although charges related to the homicide would be filed. Juan Francisco Murillo Díaz "El Güero Jaibo" and Édgar Nicolás Villegas "El Negro", members of the Tijuana Cartel, were identified as the masterminds of the homicide.

Although ordered by the Tijuana Cartel, many members of the hit squad were actually San Diego–based members from the Logan Heights Gang, trained by the Tijuana Cartel as assassins. Benjamín Arellano Félix gave up two members of the hit squad: Juan Enrique Vasconez and Ramon Torres Mendez. Torres was killed while in custody awaiting trial. Vasconez received nine years on weapons charges in Mexico.

Although the murder was committed in Mexico, the United States charged nine members of the Logan Heights hit squad in relation to the murder. Three members ultimately pled guilty and received prison sentences of 18–22 years.

=== Reopening of case ===
The Posadas case was reopened after Vicente Fox won the presidential election in 2000, ending seven decades of one-party rule. Fox took office vowing to clear up several high-profile murders. Deputy Attorney General María de la Luz Lima Malvido cited serious irregularities in earlier probes, including police obstruction and the disappearance of over 1,000 key documents. Since then, she has said she received death threats "from powerful quarters", her teenage daughter was held at gunpoint, and her two other children were fired at in their car.

New leads emerged after the case's opening, including testimony from a childhood friend of Posadas. He said that Posadas told him that he had been summoned to the residence of Mexican President Carlos Salinas and threatened just weeks before his death. "There is a lot of proof that leads us to conclude that we are before a crime of state, prepared, organized and with the participation of state security forces," Fernando Guzmán, a conservative state legislator, said. Guzmán is close to the investigation because he represented the wife of Posadas's driver, who was also killed in the attack. He said that investigators have ruled out the involvement of drug cartels, at least as the case was presented by Salinas's government. The new theory that the murder may have been ordered by members of the government was based on allegations that a senior Salinas aide warned Posadas to keep his mouth shut about information that he had uncovered linking senior politicians with the drug trade and prostitution. No one has alleged that Salinas was personally involved.

Around the 10th anniversary of the killing, senior church members urged Fox in a letter to keep his word and to see the case be solved. Posadas's successor, Cardinal Juan Sandoval, is convinced the murder was politically motivated. He, his lawyer, and Guzmán have also reported death threats and appealed to the Inter-American Commission of Human Rights for protection.

On 15 August 2006, US Department of Justice officials announced that US federal drug agents had arrested Mexican drug lord Francisco Javier Arellano Félix, a leader of the Tijuana Cartel responsible for digging elaborate tunnels to smuggle drugs under the US border. In the aforementioned press release, Department of Justice officials said that Javier Arellano Félix was also charged in Mexico in 1993 with conspiring to assassinate Posadas.

== In popular culture ==
In Don Winslow's novel The Power of the Dog, the character Father Parada is based on parts of Posadas's life and death.

In Netflix's show El Chapo, Season 1 Episode 4, Posadas is assassinated by government conspirators.

In Netflix's show Narcos: Mexico, Season 3 Episode 4, Posadas is assassinated by Ramón Arellano Félix's gunmen during a shootout with Joaquín "El Chapo" Guzmán.

== See also ==
- List of people from Morelos

== Sources ==
- Cheney, David M. "Archdiocese of Guadalajara". Catholic-Hierarchy.org. (for Chronology of Bishops)^{self-published}
- Chow, Gabriel. "Metropolitan Archdiocese of Guadalajara". GCatholic.org. (for Chronology of Bishops)^{self-published}
- "An End to Impunity: Investigating the 1993 Killing of Mexican Archbishop Juan Jesus Posadas Ocampo" (PDF). U.S. Government Publishing Office. 6 April 2006. OCLC 70870906.
- "Juan Jesús Cardinal Posadas Ocampo". Archbishop of Guadalajara, Jalisco, México. Catholic-Hierarchy.org.
