= Rafael Aguilar Guajardo =

Mexican drug lord (1950-1993)

- Born: Rafael Aguilar Guajardo; 1950; Ciudad Juárez, Chihuahua, Mexico
- Died: 12 April 1993 (aged 42–43); Cancún, Quintana Roo, Mexico
- Cause of death: Gunshot
- Occupation: Drug lord
- Title: Leader of the Juárez Cartel
- Term: 1987 – 12 April 1993
- Predecessor: Pablo Acosta Villarreal
- Successor: Amado Carrillo Fuentes
- Accomplices: Pablo Acosta Villarreal, Amado Carrillo Fuentes

Rafael Aguilar Guajardo (1950 – 12 April 1993) was a Mexican drug lord, federal police commander of the Dirección Federal de Seguridad (DFS) in Mexico, and one of the Juárez Cartel co-founders.

He was the right-hand man to Pablo Acosta Villarreal who was killed in April 1987, during a cross-border raid by Mexican Federal Police helicopters in the Rio Grande village of Santa Elena, Chihuahua. Having taken over from Acosta, Rafael Aguilar Guajardo made Amado Carrillo Fuentes his second-in-command.

Mexican police reported that Carlos Maya Castillo, an official also working at the National Security and Investigation Center, assisted Aguilar with information and reservations, provided him with cell phones, and recruited corrupt police agents for Aguilar's criminal organization.

Aguilar was shot to death while vacationing with his family in the Caribbean resort of Cancun. He was shot outside of Gypsys Restaurant on the city’s tourist strip as he returned from a submarine tour with family members.

An innocent bystander, American tourist Georgina Knafel, 32, of Nederland, Colorado was gunned down as well. Aguilar’s wife, Maria Teresa Delgado Varela, 35, and son, 11, were wounded in the attack.

Two days after threatening to reveal his high-level Mexican government contacts, Amado Carrillo Fuentes took over the reins of power in the Juárez cartel after assassinating Aguilar, setting off the city's worst ongoing bout of criminal violence. Aguilar's assets, seized by the Attorney General of Mexico (PGR), were valued at $100 million, and they included nightclubs, houses, and a 7000 m^{2} property in Acapulco.

In the streaming television series Narcos: Mexico (2018-2021), he was portrayed by Noé Hernández.

== See also ==
- Mérida Initiative
- Mexican drug war
