= Juan Francisco Murillo Díaz =

Mexican assassin

Juan Francisco Murillo Díaz, also known as "El Güero Jaibo" (Mexican Spanish slang: "Tampico Whitey"), was a member of the Tijuana Cartel (Arellano Félix Organization), believed to be one of the masterminds and shooters behind the assassination of Cardinal Juan Jesús Posadas Ocampo in Guadalajara, Jalisco, in May 1993. Although he was never arrested, Murillo was identified as the actual shooter, along with Édgar Nicolás Villegas, AKA "El Negro" (The Negro).

Murillo was killed in a shootout with judicial police in Los Mochis, Sinaloa, in August 1993.

Murillo's nephew, Ulises Murillo Mariscal, also a member of the Arellano Félix Organization, was arrested in 1994 at his home in Guadalajara, Jalisco, for possession of cocaine and several firearms. Still at large and unidentified is Murillo's other nephew, known only as "El Tiburón" (The Shark). He is believed to be living in the United States, in either San Diego or Chula Vista, California.

== See also ==
- Eduardo Arellano Félix
- Francisco Javier Arellano Félix
- Miguel Ángel Félix Gallardo
