= Narcos: Mexico =

Crime drama television series

- Genre: Crime drama; Biographical
- Created by: Chris Brancato; Carlo Bernard; Doug Miro
- Starring: Michael Peña; Diego Luna; Tenoch Huerta; Alyssa Diaz; Joaquín Cosío; José María Yazpik; Matt Letscher; Ernesto Alterio; Alejandro Edda; Fernanda Urrejola; Teresa Ruiz; Aaron Staton; Lenny Jacobson; Gerardo Taracena; Julio Cesar Cedillo; Scoot McNairy; Alfonso Dosal; Mayra Hermosillo; Manuel Masalva; Miguel Rodarte; Alex Knight; Jesse Garcia; Matt Biedel; Jero Medina; Alberto Zeni; Gorka Lasaosa; Andres Londono; Alberto Ammann; Flavio Medina; Luis Gerardo Méndez; Luisa Rubino; José Zúñiga; Beau Mirchoff; Kristen Gutoskie; Bobby Soto; Lorenzo Ferro; Alejandro Furth; Alberto Guerra
- Narrated by: Scoot McNairy (seasons 1–2); Luisa Rubino (season 3)
- Theme music composer: Rodrigo Amarante
- Opening theme: "Tuyo"
- Composers: Gustavo Santaolalla; Kevin Kiner
- Country of origin: United States
- Original languages: English; Spanish
- No. of seasons: 3
- No. of episodes: 30

Production
- Executive producers: Sidonie Dumas; Christophe Riandee; Eugene Stein; Adam Fishbach; Katie O'Connell Marsh; José Padilha; Carlo Bernard; Doug Miro; Eric Newman; Andrés Baiz; Alexandra Hunter; Nicolas Atlan
- Producers: Clayton Trussell; Ashley Lyle; Bart Nickerson; Tim King; Lorenzo O'Brien; Jesse Moore; Nick Laws; Wes Taylor; Rafael Cuervo
- Production locations: Mexico; United States
- Running time: 45–69 minutes
- Production company: Gaumont Television USA (Note: Credited as Gaumont International Television for season 1.)

Original release
- Network: Netflix
- Release: November 16, 2018 – November 5, 2021

Related
- Narcos

Narcos: Mexico is an American crime drama television series created and produced by Chris Brancato, Carlo Bernard, and Doug Miro that premiered on Netflix on November 16, 2018. It was originally intended to be the fourth season of the Netflix series Narcos, but it was ultimately developed as a companion series. It focuses on the development of Mexico's illegal drug trade, whereas the parent series centered on the establishment of Colombia's illegal drug trade. The series' second season premiered on February 13, 2020. On October 28, 2020, Netflix renewed the series for a third and final season but announced that actor Diego Luna would not be returning to reprise his role as Félix Gallardo. The third and final season premiered on November 5, 2021.

== Premise ==
The series explores the origins of the Mexican drug war, beginning at the time when traffickers were a loose and disorganized confederation of small, independent marijuana growers and dealers. It dramatizes the creation and rise of the Guadalajara Cartel in the 1980s as Miguel Ángel Félix Gallardo (Diego Luna) unifies several plazas, or territories, in order to build an infamous drug empire. Drug Enforcement Administration (DEA) agent Kiki Camarena (Michael Peña) moves his wife and young son from California to Guadalajara to take on a new post, where he quickly learns that his assignment will be more challenging than he could ever have imagined.

== Cast and characters ==
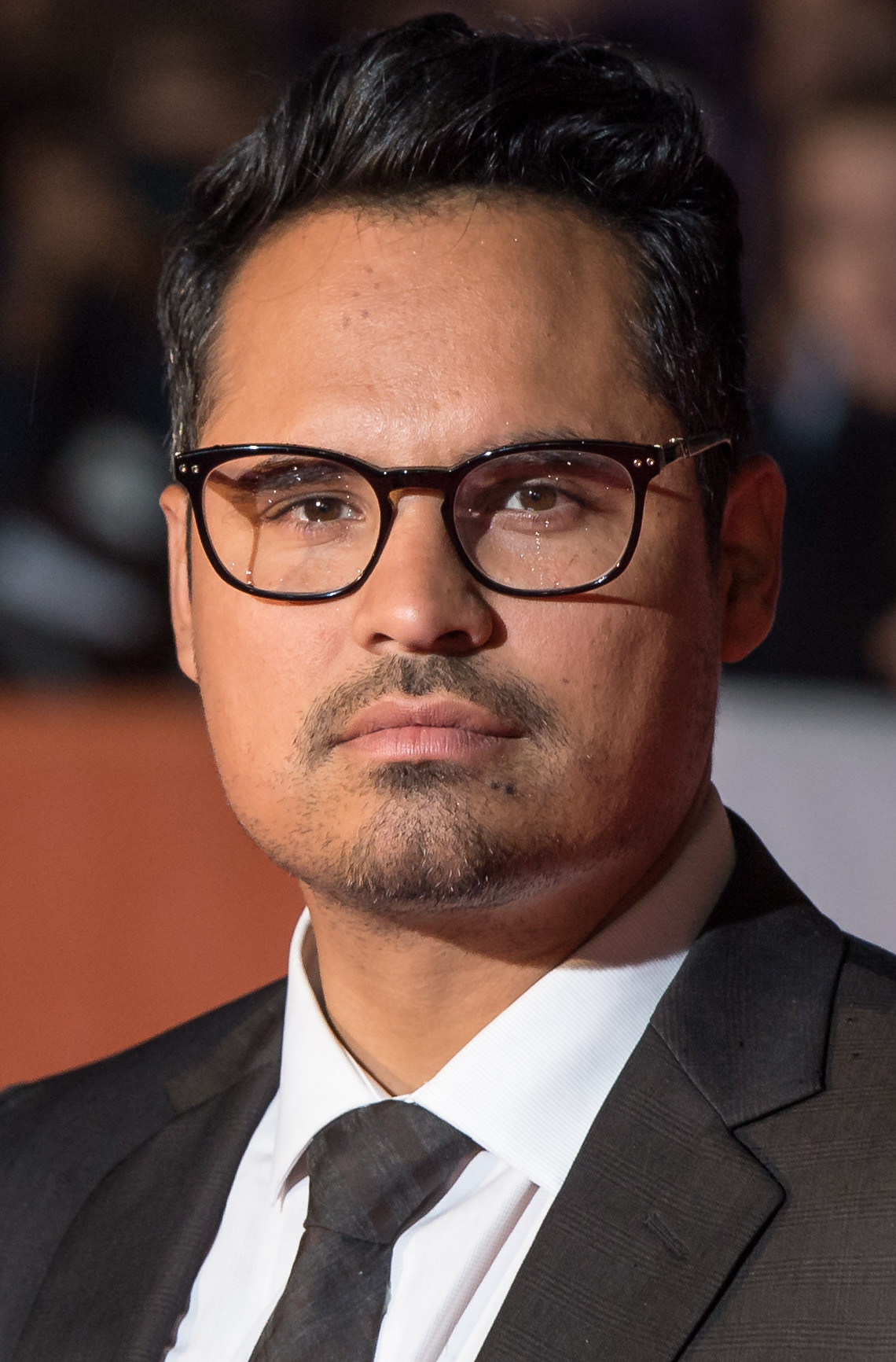
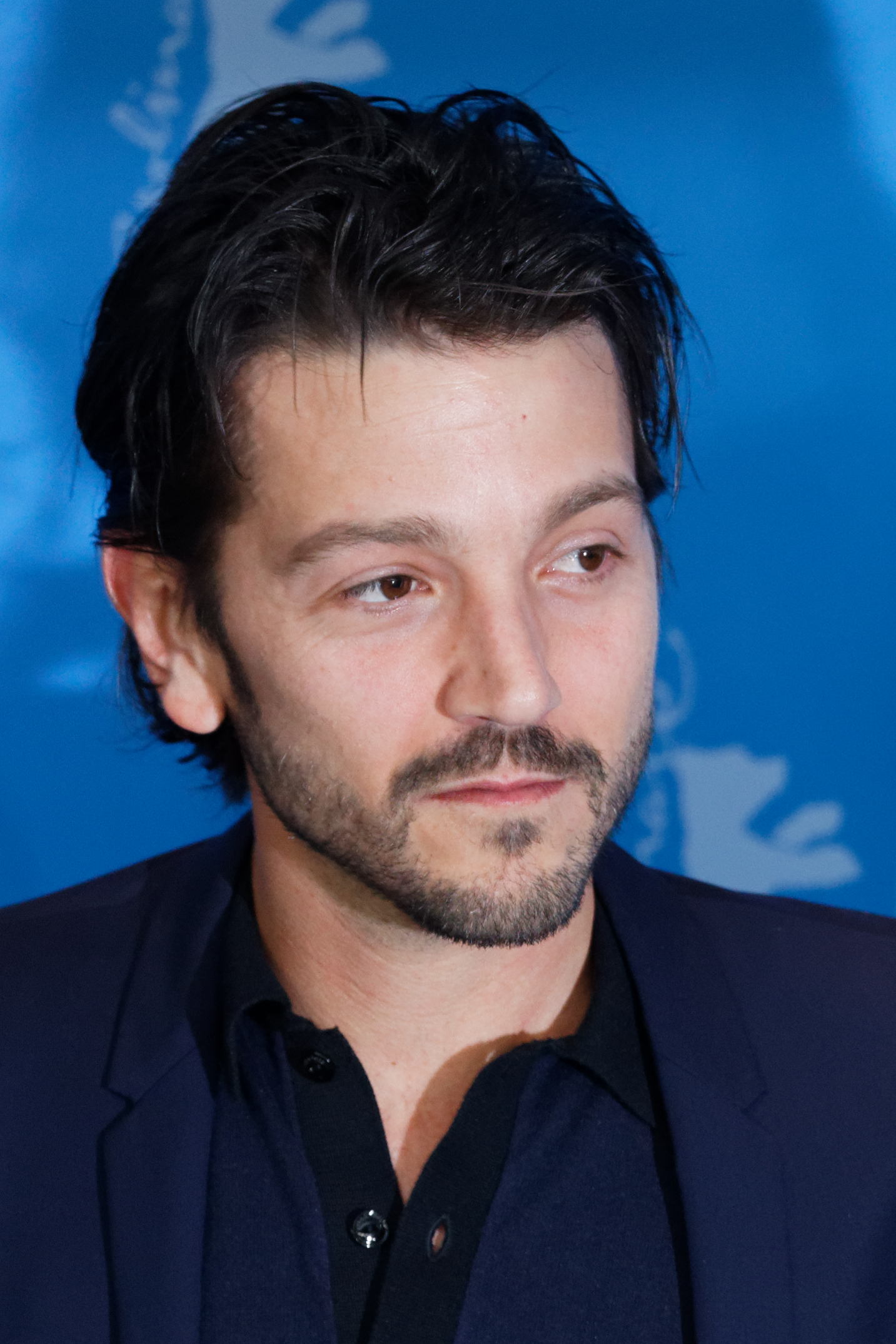
Michael Peña and Diego Luna are the leads in Season 1

=== Main ===
- Michael Peña as Kiki Camarena, a DEA agent who garners valuable intel about Félix's organization (season 1)
- Diego Luna as Miguel Ángel Félix Gallardo, the leader of the Guadalajara Cartel and founder of the modern Mexican drug trade (seasons 1–2; guest season 3)
- Tenoch Huerta as Rafael "Rafa" Caro Quintero, Felix's business partner (season 1; guest season 2)
- Alyssa Diaz as Mika Camarena, Kiki's wife (season 1)
- Joaquín Cosío as Ernesto "Don Neto" Fonseca Carrillo, Felix's business partner, Amado's uncle (season 1; guest season 2; recurring season 3)
- José María Yazpik as Amado Carrillo Fuentes, Felix's business partner, Neto's nephew (reprising his role from Narcos)
- Matt Letscher as Jaime Kuykendall, head of the Guadalajara bureau of the DEA (seasons 1 and 3; guest season 2)
- Ernesto Alterio as Salvador Osuna Nava, Director general of the Dirección Federal de Seguridad (season 1)
- Alejandro Edda as Joaquín "El Chapo" Guzmán, a member of the Sinaloa Cartel (seasons 1–3)
- Fernanda Urrejola as Maria Elvira, Felix's wife (seasons 1–2)
- Teresa Ruiz as Isabella Bautista, Felix's friend and business associate (based on Sandra Ávila Beltrán) (seasons 1–2)
- Aaron Staton as Butch Sears, a DEA agent (season 1)
- Lenny Jacobson as Roger Knapp, a DEA agent (season 1)
- Gerardo Taracena as Pablo Acosta, the leader of the Juarez Cartel (seasons 1–2)
- Julio Cesar Cedillo as Guillermo González Calderoni, the commander of the Federal Judicial Police (seasons 1–2)
- Scoot McNairy as Walt Breslin, a DEA agent, and narrator of the story (loosely based on Hector Berrellez) (seasons 2–3; recurring season 1)
- Alfonso Dosal as Benjamín Arellano Félix, the leader of the Tijuana Cartel, Enedina's and Ramón's older brother (seasons 2–3; recurring season 1)
- Mayra Hermosillo as Enedina Arellano Félix, a high-ranking member of the Tijuana Cartel, Benjamín's and Ramón's sister (seasons 2–3)
- Manuel Masalva as Ramón Arellano Félix, an enforcer and high-ranking member of the Tijuana Cartel, Benjamín's and Enedina's younger brother (seasons 2–3; recurring season 1)
- Miguel Rodarte as Danilo Garza – a Mexican police officer and member of Operation Leyenda (season 2)
- Alex Knight as Kenny Moss, a DEA agent and member of Operation Leyenda (main season 2, guest season 1)
- Jesse Garcia as Sal Orozco, a DEA agent and member of Operation Leyenda (season 2)
- Matt Biedel as Daryl Petsky, a DEA agent and member of Operation Leyenda (season 2)
- Jero Medina as Ossie Mejía, a Mexican police officer and member of Operation Leyenda (season 2)
- Alberto Zeni as Amat Palacios, a Mexican police officer and member of Operation Leyenda (season 2)
- Gorka Lasaosa as Héctor Luis Palma Salazar, a member of the Sinaloa Cartel (seasons 2–3; recurring season 1)
- Andres Londono as Enrique Clavel, Felix's right-hand man (season 2)
- Alberto Ammann as Hélmer "Pacho" Herrera, a high-ranking member of the Cali Cartel (reprising his role from Narcos) (seasons 2–3; guest season 1)
- Flavio Medina as Juan García Abrego – the leader of the Gulf Cartel and Guerra's nephew (seasons 2–3)
- Luis Gerardo Méndez as Victor Tapia, a Juárez police officer drawn to a series of killings (season 3)
- Luisa Rubino as Andrea Nuñez, a young journalist investigating the activities of the cartel, works for La Voz de Tijuana (season 3)
- José Zúñiga as Jesús Gutiérrez Rebollo, Mexican military general opposing the cartels (season 3)
- Beau Mirchoff as Steve Sheridan, a DEA agent (season 3)
- Kristen Gutoskie as Dani, Walt's girlfriend (season 3)
- Bobby Soto as David Barron Corona, a high-ranking member of the Logan Heights Gang and hit-man for the Tijuana cartel (season 3; recurring season 2)
- Lorenzo Ferro as Alex Hodoyan, a member of Ramón's Narcojuniors gang (season 3)
- Alejandro Furth as Ramon Salgado, co-founder of La Voz de Tijuana and Andrea's boss (season 3)
- Alberto Guerra as Ismael "El Mayo" Zambada, an independent drug trafficker using his fishing business as a front (season 3)

=== Recurring ===
- Tessa Ía as Sofia Conesa (season 1)
- Clark Freeman as Ed Heath (seasons 1–2)
- Fermin Martinez as Juan José "El Azul" Esparragoza Moreno (seasons 1–3)
- Guillermo Villegas as Sammy Alvarez (season 1)
- Horacio Garcia Rojas as Tomas Morlet (season 1)
- Jackie Earle Haley as Jim Ferguson (season 1)
- Yul Vazquez as John Gavin (season 1)
- Brian Buckley as John Clay Walker (season 1)
- Mark Kubr as Tony (season 1)
- Mike Doyle as Thomas Buehl (season 1)
- Wagner Moura as Pablo Escobar (reprising his role from Narcos) (seasons 1 and 3)
- Francisco Denis as Miguel Rodríguez Orejuela (reprising his role from Narcos) (season 1)
- Pêpê Rapazote as José "Chepe" Santacruz-Londoño (reprising his role from Narcos) (seasons 1 and 3)
- Jorge A. Jimenez as Roberto "Poison" Ramos (reprising his role from Narcos) (season 1)
- Eric Lange as Bill Stechner (reprising his role from Narcos) (seasons 1–2)
- Milton Cortés as Rubén Zuno Arce (season 1–2)
- Julián Díaz as Blackie (reprising his role from Narcos) (season 1)
- Francisco Barreiro as Francisco Rafael Arellano Félix (seasons 1–3)
- Julián Arango as Orlando Henao Montoya (reprising his role from Narcos) (season 2–3)
- Matias Varela as Jorge Salcedo Cabrera (reprising his role from Narcos) (season 2)
- Juan Sebastián Calero as Navegante (reprising his role from Narcos) (season 2)
- Viviana Serna as Guadalupe Leija Serrano ("Lupita"), wife of Héctor Luis Palma Salazar (season 2)
- Sosie Bacon as Mimi Webb Miller (season 2)
- Jesús Ochoa as Juan Nepomuceno Guerra (seasons 2–3)
- Noé Hernández as Rafael Aguilar Guajardo (seasons 2–3)
- José Julián as Javier Arellano Félix (seasons 2–3)
- Sebastián Buitrón as Eduardo Arellano Félix (seasons 2–3)
- Adriana Llabrés as Ruth Arellano Félix (seasons 2–3)
- Manuel Uriza as Carlos Hank Gonzalez (season 3)
- Damayanti Quintanar as Hortencia Tapia (season 3)
- James Earl as Craig Mills (season 3)
- Benito Antonio Martínez Ocasio as Everardo Arturo “Kitty” Paez (season 3)
- Yessica Borroto as Marta (season 3)
- Damián Alcázar as Gilberto Rodríguez Orejuela (reprising his role from Narcos) (season 3)
- Diego Calva as Arturo Beltrán Leyva (season 3)
- Fernando Bonilla as Vicente Carrillo Fuentes (season 3)
- Markin López as Rogelio (season 3)
- Iván Aragón as Alfredo Hodoyan (season 3)
- Eric Etebari as Jack Dorian (season 3)
- José Zúñiga as Jesus Gutierrez Rebollo (season 3)

== Episodes ==
Season	Episodes	Originally released
1	10	November 16, 2018
2	10	February 13, 2020
3	10	November 5, 2021

=== Season 1 (2018) ===
No. overall	No. in season	Title	Directed by	Written by	Original release date
1	1	"Camelot"	Josef Kubota Wladyka	Eric Newman & Clayton Trussell	November 16, 2018
In 1980, while the Mexican army pillages the countryside of Sinaloa, an ambitious policeman Miguel Angel Félix Gallardo decides to create a drug empire in Guadalajara. Meanwhile, a young DEA agent Kiki Camarena is transferred to Mexico.
2	2	"The Plaza System"	Josef Kubota Wladyka	Carlo Bernard & Doug Miro	November 16, 2018
Rafa studies the logistics of a unique variety of marijuana (sinsemilia, or seedless) which requires isolation from pollinating males, making the desert the site for the grow operation. Problems arise when there appears to be a lack of water for cultivation leading Rafa to confront and threaten the geology professor who helped to locate the land. Frustrated and drunk, Rafa eventually turns to throwing explosives in dug-out holes, happening to discover a source of water. Félix continues his meetings to reach an agreement with the plazas but a humiliated and stubborn Avilés refuses to make amends with Acosta and condemns Félix to death after the deal falls apart. As they both are traveling back to Sinaloa, they are intercepted by the police, who kill Avilés, putting Félix at the head of the Guadalajara cartel.
3	3	"El Padrino"	Andrés Baiz	Ashley Lyle & Bart Nickerson	November 16, 2018
Kiki, after realizing the high level of corruption, undertakes a dangerous undercover operation on his own in the plantation camps. After reaching the desired agreement, Félix, Rafa and Don Neto become the bosses of a drug empire. Félix organizes a wedding party for one of his best friends, a son of the Governor, at which he forces an end to the conflict between Nava and the Arellano brothers.
4	4	"Rafa, Rafa, Rafa!"	Andrés Baiz	Scott Teems	November 16, 2018
After months, Kiki and his men try to arrest the narcos without success. Félix remains in an unsafe position for the reckless actions of Rafa who conspired with Sofia, his lover, to organize a fake kidnapping, unleashing a manhunt by Sofia's father, an important political figure in Mexico City. To ensure Rafa's safety, Félix agrees to do a favor for Nava, whom he had previously refused. After following through with the favor, Félix is beaten by Nava's men to make clear who is in charge.
5	5	"The Colombian Connection"	Amat Escalante	Andy Black	November 16, 2018
The investigations endanger Kiki's wife but he is convinced to continue his job. Kiki infiltrates Felix's office in order to obtain financial documents and with his men plan to arrest him in the United States. After the routing of the cocaine shipments through the Bahamas was blocked by the United States, Félix makes contact with the Colombian cartels and reach an agreement with the Cali Cartel of the Orejuela brothers. Following the meeting, Pablo Escobar warns Felix and proposes another deal, half and half with him and Cali.
6	6	"La Última Frontera"	Amat Escalante	Jessie Nickson-Lopez & Clayton Trussell	November 16, 2018
The war of marijuana trafficking between Rafa and Falcón continues. The pressure on Félix is increased after the deal with politics is not closed. The DEA set up a trap using one of Félix's American associates to make contact and lure him to the US on the pretense of signing documents to protect his financial interests. Isabella is able to reach an agreement with Falcón before she finds that decisions have already been made regarding his fate. When Félix is ready to cross the Mexican border, he receives a call from Zuno, a high-ranking political figure warning him of the trap. Kiki cannot intervene and returns home frustrated and disillusioned.
7	7	"Jefe de Jefes"	Alonso Ruizpalacios	Story by : Ashley Lyle & Bart Nickerson and Clayton Trussell; Teleplay by : Ashley Lyle & Bart Nickerson	November 16, 2018
Rafa is out of control as his cocaine use continues. He begins to attract attention when one night in a club, shots are fired after seeing Sofia with Amado. Don Neto is grieving his son, who is killed in an altercation outside a disco. Paranoia starts to get to Rafa leading him and others to brutally murder two American tourists, convinced the DEA had sent them to spy on him. Félix organizes a reunion to place new orders and territories excluding Isabella who does not take it well. Afterwards, Nava attempts to intimidate Félix before the latter murders him as Azul watches.
8	8	"Just Say No"	Alonso Ruizpalacios	Doug Miro	November 16, 2018
The DEA agents and the Mexican army penetrate the marijuana plantation, confiscating and burning the entire crop, making it one of the greatest drug busts of all time. In doing so, it begins a war with Rafa, who manages to escape with the help of Chapo and his men. A confused Félix goes to Mexico City to seek guidance on the how to deal with Kiki, all the while Azul persuades Rafa to order the kidnapping of Kiki and Don Neto is too late to intervene.
9	9	"881 Lope de Vega"	Andrés Baiz	Clayton Trussell	November 16, 2018
As Kiki is interrogated and tortured, Mika reports his disappearance to Jaime. Knowing there will be a manhunt for Rafa, Félix tells him to flee the country and so he leaves with Sofia for Costa Rica. Jaime is sent in circles by the Mexican police system and an angry Mika confronts Ed Heath. A new police chief is appointed to the operation but, after intercepting Rafa at the airport runway, allows his escape. Elsewhere, Félix manages to escape arrest after being informed by Azul on an imminent raid. An anonymous tip to the DEA regarding Rafa's whereabouts leads to his arrest and information on Kiki's location. Don Neto visits Félix and it is revealed that, knowing his empire was in danger, Félix made the anonymous tip.
10	10	"Leyenda"	Andrés Baiz	Carlo Bernard	November 16, 2018
After a week, Jaime and the DEA agents find the body of Kiki Camarena near a ranch. Neto leaves Guadalajara and goes into hiding by the coast. Félix returns to Sinaloa and asks the Governor for refuge which is only achieved with a large payment deal. Isabella persuades Benjamín to take what is left of the cartel. The Governor betrays Félix and the police ambush him when he is about to leave. However, Félix is able to make an agreement with the commander, allowing him to be politically protected. Neto is found and arrested, knowing he had been betrayed by Félix. Azul informs Félix of a new meeting in Ensenada which he gatecrashes, presenting the new deal with the politicians and taking leadership again, kicking Isabella out in the process. The DEA begins Operation Leyenda in Mexico to put an end to the Guadalajara Cartel.

=== Season 2 (2020) ===
No. overall	No. in season	Title	Directed by	Written by	Original release date
11	1	"Salva El Tigre"	Andrés Baiz	Carlo Bernard & Johnny Newman	February 13, 2020
Several months after the arrests of Don Neto and Caro, Félix celebrates his fortieth birthday with the heads of his plazas. Félix meets with the Cali Cartel's Pacho Herrera to request payment for debts they owe him, as he has been keeping his organization operating with his own funds. Herrera rejects his request citing the increased seizures due to the Americans targeting him following Camarena's execution. Isabella travels to Colombia to acquire her own supply of cocaine. DEA agent Walt Breslin begins Operation Leyenda by kidnapping Delgado, the physician who aided in the torture of Kiki Camarena by keeping him awake with adrenaline, and forcing the doctor to give up the name of the torturer Sergio Verdín, a DFS agent. Breslin's team then kidnaps Verdín on the streets in a gunfight.
12	2	"Alea Iacta Est"	Amat Escalante	Eric Newman & Eva Aridjis	February 13, 2020
Félix travels to meet with Juan Nepomuceno Guerra, head of the Gulf Cartel that primarily deals in opium, to make a new partnership and create a monopoly on the import of cocaine into America and take away options from the Colombian cartels. Breslin tortures Verdín, but Verdín has been trained to resist torture and only breaks once he is shot in the gut. He gives them the name of the owner of the estate where Camarena was tortured: Rubén Zuno Arce.
13	3	"Ruben Zuno Arce"	Amat Escalante	Clayton Trussell	February 13, 2020
Zuno goes into hiding in Puerto Vallarta with a heavily armed guard provided by his uncle, Mexico's Secretary of Defense. Operation Leyenda then scare Zuno into fleeing from his guarded estate, where they divert his jet to Texas and he is arrested. Meanwhile, Amado helps Acosta end a feud that was keeping Acosta from helping complete the runways. Tensions rise between the Sinaloa and the Tijuana plazas when Félix imposes a tax on Sinaloa to transport through Tijuana.
14	4	"The Big Dig"	Marcela Said	Doug Miro & Alec Ziff	February 13, 2020
Zuno gives the DEA the names of his uncle and Félix as those that knew about Camarena's kidnap and execution, but then denies his statements in front of the Grand Jury, effectively putting an end to Operation Leyenda as an official investigation into Camarena's death. Following a plane owned by CIA-backed arms smuggler Juan Matta-Ballesteros being shot down on its way to the Nicaraguan Contras, Félix meets with the CIA to offer his assistance. Matta is subsequently given up by the Mexican government as an act of compliance with the United States efforts to stop the drug trade following Zuno's arrest, and Félix takes over Matta's routes for the CIA. Sinaloan El Chapo takes matters into his own hands and buys property outside Tijuana on both sides of the US–Mexico border with the intentions of building a tunnel. Isabella makes a deal with Enedina Arellano Félix of the Tijuana plaza to transport her cocaine behind Félix Gallardo's back.
15	5	"AFO"	Marcela Said	Carlo Bernard & Clayton Trussell & Johnny Newman	February 13, 2020
Breslin and his team learn of the escalating conflict between the Sinaloa and Tijuana plazas. The Sinaloans pull their product from Tijuana and begin taking it through the tunnel, which is then discovered by the DEA team. Breslin's team then leaks the information to the Tijuana plaza who retaliates by destroying the tunnel and executing everyone at the tunnel with El Chapo escaping through the other end of the tunnel. Félix takes Amado to meet with the Cali Cartel in Panama to enforce his monopoly on the cocaine transportation and get into the direct sale of the product in America utilizing Amado and his airstrips in Ciudad Juárez. However, Félix is betrayed by Guerra who made a deal directly with the Colombians to transport cocaine. To cover his surprise, he asks the cartel for as much cocaine as they could supply and agrees to transport about 70 tons.
16	6	"El Dedazo"	Andrés Baiz	Carlo Bernard	February 13, 2020
In need of transportation for the cocaine, Amado begins purchasing jets. Breslin's team learns of the meeting in Panama and follow Amado to an auction and place trackers on the jets he purchased. Using the trackers, they find the runway outside Juárez. Following a failed assassination attempt on him by Guerra, Félix goes to Sinaloa to try and visit his ex-wife and children. The Tijuana and Sinaloa plazas agree to make peace, but upon learning of the attempt on Félix, Benjamín Arellano Félix uses the leverage to instead execute Sinaloan Cochiloco.
17	7	"Truth and Reconciliation"	Amat Escalante	Clayton Trussell	February 13, 2020
The head of the Sinaloa plaza, Palma, calls the head of the Juárez plaza, Acosta, and proposes they join against Félix, but is recorded by Aguilar, the corrupt DFS commander that had been working with Acosta and Amado in Juárez. Félix then orders Azul to execute Palma. Palma escapes after his wife is tipped off by her lover Clavel, Félix's chauffeur. Meanwhile, Acosta meets with Breslin about a deal that would get him out of the trafficking business in return for Félix Gallardo. Félix initiates a plan to gain influence with the new PRI presidential candidate in the 1988 election utilizing the new polling computers to sway public perception on election day.
18	8	"Se Cayó El Sistema"	Amat Escalante	Doug Miro	February 13, 2020
Acosta goes to the American press and gives an interview on the trafficking through Mexico, leading to multiple parties looking to hunt him down. Breslin finds Acosta in a small border town to give him an immunity deal, but Acosta is killed in a joint DFS and FBI assault on the town. Félix is in Mexico City overseeing the election results with the computers displaying false results from the polling stations leading to a lower voter turnout, but they crash the system when others get suspicious. Félix then makes his plazas go to the polling stations and alter the tally results of the election for a PRI win. They burn the physical ballots afterwards. Herrera informs Félix his 70 tons of coke are ready for pickup and Amado must rush to get his planes ready in time; Amado then finds the trackers on the planes.
19	9	"Growth, Prosperity, and Liberation"	Andrés Baiz	Clayton Trussell	February 13, 2020
Félix reconciles with his ex-wife Maria. Amado picks up the cocaine in Chiapas, but stays behind when the planes are sent to Juárez. Breslin and his team intercept the planes at the runway and attempt to burn the coke, but is discovered to be fake. They are ambushed and most of the team is killed. The real shipment makes it to Juárez the next day where Félix splits it evenly among the plazas and Breslin gets reassigned.
20	10	"Free Trade"	Andrés Baiz	Carlo Bernard	February 13, 2020
Twenty tons of the Colombians' cocaine is seized by the DEA in Sylmar, California, which Félix then uses as leverage to have the Colombians give him cocaine for retail in America on top of being their primary transporter. Following the requests of the plaza bosses, Félix grants Palma clemency for his planned betrayal, but has Clavel murder Palma's wife and throw his children off a bridge as a message to the bosses. Maria then kicks Félix out of the house and forbids him from seeing his children again. At a meeting of the plazas, Félix informs the bosses of their new goal of setting up sales and distribution in the United States. All the plaza bosses then withdraw from the federation with the Arellano Félix family forming the Tijuana Cartel; Azul, Palma and Chapo forming the Sinaloa Cartel; and Amado and Aguilar leading the Juárez Cartel. The Tijuana Cartel uses Isabella's contact in Colombia to source their own supply of cocaine and cut her out of the business, while Amado contacted Herrera directly to give the Cali Cartel another option to transport their supply through Mexico. Félix is then arrested at home as a signal by the Mexican government that they were complying with the effort to end drug trafficking and get included in what would become NAFTA. Breslin meets Félix in prison, who then proceeds to outline the upcoming chaos that will be caused by the disputes among the new cartels that eventually leads into the Mexican drug war.

=== Season 3 (2021) ===
No. overall	No. in season	Title	Directed by	Written by	Original release date
21	1	"12 Steps"	Andrés Baiz	Carlo Bernard	November 5, 2021
Amado is caught by the Mexican army when his plane, loaded with cocaine, goes down in the desert. Walt is working undercover in El Paso and works his AA sponsor to get work his way into smugglers. Amado is released following three months in prison and he returns to his home in Sinaloa to find that his daughter has died which in turn causes him to rethink his life. Carlos Hank Gonzalez makes Amado an offer for the land in Juarez to improve his business holdings and position in preparation for NAFTA, which Amado accepts after he executes Aguilar for operating in a way that he thinks risks too much exposure. Walt burns his undercover identity with his sponsor in an attempt to move up the chain to catch bigger fish. Juarez police officer Victor looks for a missing girl.
22	2	"Como La Flor"	Andres Baiz	Clayton Trussell	November 5, 2021
Tijuana journalist Andrea takes an interest in the wedding between Enedina Arellano and Claudio, a prominent attorney, as she suspects corruption. The reception serves as a meeting of sorts between the various smugglers and the tension between them result in some ugliness. Andrea crashes the wedding after-party and takes an interest in the teen guests, especially the son of a judge who is friends with Ramon. Walt considers moving to Chicago after his attempt to roll up the smugglers he was working through his undercover efforts and his AA sponsor ends in a spectacular failure. Amado is revealed to be the one who is one step ahead of Walt in El Paso.
23	3	"Los Juniors"	Wagner Moura	Maggie Cohn	November 5, 2021
The Arellanos work to squeeze the Sinaloans out of the trade by levying taxes and denying them a border. Andrea continues investigating the narcojuniors (rich private school kids who are playing gangster and doing the bidding of the Arellanos, including murders) and proposes to her editor at La Voz that drug money is funding the development of Tijuana. Amado works to transform his cartel into a cell system with the help of his brother / enforcer helping to get rid of the remaining parts of Aguilar’s mess and asking Cali for some time to get it all going. Walt starts working Juarez police officer Victor as a CI who initially refuses but then starts to reconsider when he finds more dead girls as he does his police rounds. Chapo leads the Sinaloans in an assault on the Arellanos at Benjamin’s 40th birthday party where Claudio is killed and Ramon and Benjamin barely escape.
24	4	"GDL"	Wagner Moura	Wes Taylor	November 5, 2021
El Chapo ignores the advice of everybody to lay low and wait until a large catastrophe garners the attention of the Arellano Felix Organization (AFO / Tijuana Cartel) and makes plans to fly to Juarez to find Amado. The younger brother Ramon goes on a mission to kill El Chapo which turns into a massive firefight and bloodbath at the Guadalajara airport that results in the death of the cardinal who leads the Roman Catholic church in Mexico. Meanwhile Amado has begun to fulfill the destiny outlined by Felix to Walt during the prison interview... moving the chess pieces in place to become more powerful than everybody else in the game. Amado spends time in Cuba working a deal with Cali since they are the dominant cocaine produced as Pablo Escobar is killed by Colombian special forces. Amado's improved organization that utilizes technology such as wireless pagers to deliver instructions holds up against American investigations. Amado also contacts Hank to build a partnership to move cocaine and launder money. Andrea continues to pursue her stories and connects Hank with money laundering for AFO through a casino in Tijuana. Victor thinks he may be onto a serial killer of young girls.
25	5	"Boots on the Ground"	Alejandra Márquez Abella	Iturri Sosa	November 5, 2021
The death of the Cardinal reflects poorly on the state of Mexico which is preparing for NAFTA prompting the formation of a Mexican Army task force to be led by Gen. Rebollo who is well known for burning millions in cash and drugs. Walt disappoints Dani by asking for a transfer to go to Mexico for a few months to join the task force. The task force nearly captures Benjamin Arellano Felix but is thwarted by a violent rescue led by Ramon. Benjamin flees Tijuana and leaves Enedina in charge. Victor starts investigating the auto parts factory for potential leads to the serial killer preying on young girls. El Chapo is double crossed by Guatemalan border patrol officers he has paid off who collect the 15M peso ransom offered by the Mexican government.
26	6	"La Jefa"	Alejandra Márquez Abella	Alec Ziff & Isaac Gomez	November 5, 2021
Victor finally finds the body of the teenage girl he is looking for. The coroner is unable to help Victor with an investigation so Victor calls up the DEA in an attempt to trade information for assistance with DNA testing. A narcojunior is caught on the way back to Mexico after a cocaine run with 14k USD in cash along with a 9mm in his glove box. Walt uses the narcojunior as a canary to find a safe house where they are able to arrest Francisco Arelleno Felix while Ramon barely escapes in a firefight. The narcojunior realizes that he was responsible for the attack and Ramon uses the narcojunior to feed a setup to the army task force and execute a revenge attack. The Cali cartel shuts down and Amado secures a new supply of cocaine from the north valley. Enedina is the new boss of the AFO and lashes out at Mayo (burning his boats), Sinaloa (killing Azul) and attempting to kill Amado.
27	7	"La Voz"	Luis Ortega	Clayton Trussell and Maggie Cohn	November 5, 2021
La Voz distribution is attacked by a bomb and Andrea is subject to intimidation following its reporting on Colosio's assassins. Victor becomes a CI to the El Paso DEA to get DNA work on the person killing girls which ultimately puts him in danger and unfortunately has inconclusive results so he decides to take things to the street and start asking questions to other women who work at the factory. Mayo and Chapo form an alliance against the Tijuana AFO cartel with Amado providing monetary support to the cause. The Mexican Army task force captures the narcojunior and begins the process of enhanced interrogation to get the information they want from him. The AFO leadership is starting to feel the pressure of the blowback from their actions. Hank freezes Amado's accounts to force Amado to stop backing the bloodshed and creating public problems for their business.
28	8	"Last Dance"	Luis Ortega	Carlo Bernard & Clayton Trussell	November 5, 2021
The Mexican economy collapses and USD based businesses are suddenly worth double what they were. Torturing narcojunior Alex fails to produce results so Walt switches tactics and builds rapport to get the information on Alex's brother but it is too late as the AFO has decided that they need to get rid of them. Andrea sifts through financial records tied to Hank and the PRI passed to her by an assistant for the assassinated presidential candidate. El Chapo becomes an effective manager of the Sinaloan cartel while serving time in jail with his henchman running around with Mayo utilizing violence to flip AFO affiliates. Victor loses his job as a cop and starts working security while following up on his obsession with the serial murderer attacking girls. Amado plans for a future where he will leave the narcotics business.
29	9	"The Reckoning"	Amat Escalante	Carlo Bernard & Clayton Trussell	November 5, 2021
Violence between Sinaloa (led by Mayo on the street and El Chapo inside prison) and the Arellano Felix Organization escalates. Palma is caught by the police and imprisoned with El Chapo and Neto where he threatens El Chapo's leadership seniority. Andrea uncovers a startling connection between a former beauty queen who is forwarding payments from Amado to General Rebollo who is in charge of prosecuting the Mexican drug war. Walt pressures narcojunior Alex to review wire taps that reveal the illness afflicting Benjamin Arellano Felix's daughter Ruth which enables the team to raid Benjamin's house. Benjamin was not present during the raid but his family is detained, rattling Benjamin. Hank threatens Amado and sends accountants to Amado's office where Amado proceeds to murder them and begin his exit strategy.
30	10	"Life in Wartime"	Amat Escalante	Carlo Bernard	November 5, 2021
Mexican and US authorities search in earnest for Amado. Amado and his men engage in a gunfight with the army at the airport, but he escapes at the last minute. Amado apparently dies in a hospital in Mexico while undergoing appearance-altering plastic surgery, with those who performed the surgery being executed by his men as revenge. While in prison, Chapo makes moves to show he's the boss. Alex gets killed by Arellanos immediately after escaping from Walt's custody. Victor Tapia catches and kills the person he believes is abusing and slaughtering women, only to find the rabbit hole goes deeper than he realized. Tapia's friend Rogelio kills Tapia after discovering that he was the rat. Enedina sends Ramón on a mission. Mayo has his men kill Ramón. In Chile, Amado's lover is seen sitting in a hotel alone with two wine glasses, implying that Amado faked his death.

== Production ==
=== Development ===
Netflix renewed Narcos for two more seasons on September 6, 2016, a few days after the release of the second season. Production on the fourth season began in Mexico in late 2017, following the release of the third season. On July 18, 2018, Netflix announced that the fourth season would instead "reset" with almost an entirely new cast as a new Netflix original series titled Narcos: Mexico.

The first season was released on November 16, 2018, and Netflix renewed it for a second season on December 5, 2018.

=== Cast and crew ===
In December 2017, Michael Peña and Diego Luna were announced to star in the upcoming series. A few days later, Matt Letscher joined the cast in a regular role. Other key cast members revealed by showrunner Eric Newman include Tenoch Huerta, Joaquín Cosío, Teresa Ruiz, Alyssa Diaz, and José María Yazpik (reprising his role from the third season of Narcos).

Amat Escalante and Alonso Ruizpalacios directed episodes for the upcoming series, while Colombian Andi Baiz, director of several episodes for the first three seasons of Narcos, also directed for Narcos: Mexico. Actor Wagner Moura, who portrayed Pablo Escobar in the original Narcos also directed two episodes of season three. In October 2020, it was announced that Eric Newman had left as showrunner.

=== Murder of location scout ===
Carlos Muñoz Portal, one of the show's location scouts, was found murdered with multiple gunshot wounds on September 15, 2017, in central Mexico near the town of Temascalapa. A spokesman for the attorney general in Mexico said that there were no witnesses due to the remote location, but the authorities would continue to investigate. Authorities are considering the possibility of narco gang involvement, but the murder has not been solved.

== Factual differences ==
Although many of the events and characters are based on true history, some liberties were taken to streamline the story of the Mexican drug war into a cohesive narrative. The murders of John Clay Walker and Albert Radelat were real; however, they were reportedly tortured beforehand. The character of Sofia Conesa, portrayed as the love interest of Rafael Caro Quintero, was named Sara Cosio in real life. The killing of Hector Luis Palma's family on the orders of Miguel Angel Felix Gallardo is also a disputed claim which still needs documented verification, as it is actually believed to have been done on the orders of the Arellano Félix brothers and in a more brutal fashion. The assassination of El Azul in Season 3 did not actually occur, as El Azul in real life was active until at least 2014, when he reportedly died of a heart attack, aged 65.

In the third season, General Gutiérrez Rebollo, the Anti-Drug Czar, is arrested after Andrea Núñez finds the bank account receiving over US$2 million and linking it to Rebollo. In reality, General Gutiérrez Rebollo received a call from the Secretary of Defense, General Enrique Cervantes, who ordered him to report to his office immediately on the night of February 6, 1997 where he was arrested. Also in this season, the men of the Tijuana Cartel escaped from the Guadalajara airport in a TAESA plane, allegedly owned by Carlos Hank González, after the murder of Cardenal Juan Jesús Posadas Ocampo. However, Carlos Hank González was never the owner of this airline and there are multiple theories about the escape of the Tijuana Cartel that day, none of which effectively link TAESA to the case. Likewise, while there are a series of accusations against Hank Gonzalez linking him to organized crime, Hank was never prosecuted or sentenced for such links. The reason he could be named, according to José María Yazpik, is that "since Hank is already dead, his name can be used, while in other seasons, when faced with a possible lawsuit, they opted to change the names".

== Reception ==
=== Critical response ===
The first season of Narcos: Mexico has a score of 90% on Rotten Tomatoes based on 39 reviews with an average rating of 7.4/10, with the critics consensus stating "Dangerous, thrilling, and highly addictive, Narcos: Mexico's first season expertly expands the franchise by exploring new territory in the drug war's grim history and showcasing electric performances from Diego Luna and Michael Penà." On Metacritic, season one holds a weighted average score of 80 out of 100, based on 7 critics, indicating "generally favorable reviews".

The second season holds a rating of 81% on Rotten Tomatoes based on 16 reviews with a weighted average score of 7.6/10. The site's critical consensus reads, "As addictive -- and relevant -- as ever, Narcos: Mexico's sophomore season is definitely more violent, but it never spoils the rich drama fans have come to love."

The third and final season holds a score of 100% on Rotten Tomatoes based on seven reviews with an average rating of 7/10.

=== Accolades ===
Year	Award	Category	Nominee	Result	Ref.
2019	Critics' Choice Television Awards	Best Actor in a Drama Series	Diego Luna	Nominated	
2019	Actors and Actresses Union Awards	Best Actor in an International Production	Alberto Ammann	Won	
2019	Platino Awards	Best Ibero-American Miniseries or TV series	Narcos: Mexico	Nominated	
2019	Platino Awards	Best Actor in a Miniseries or TV series	Diego Luna	Won	
2020	Casting Society of America	Television Pilot & First Season – Drama	Carla Hool	Nominated	
2022	International Emmy Awards	Best Drama Series	Narcos: Mexico	Nominated	
2022	International Emmy Awards	Best Performance by an Actor	Scoot McNairy	Nominated	
