= Rafael Caro Quintero =

Mexican drug lord (born 1952)

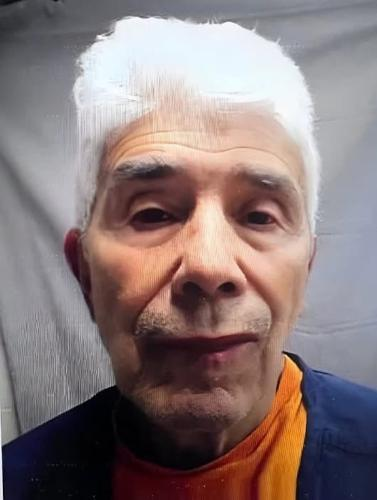
- Caro Quintero in US custody, 2025

FBI Ten Most Wanted Fugitive
- Charges: Drug trafficking
- Reward: $20,000,000
- Alias: "El Narco de Narcos" "El Número 1"

Description
- Born: October 24, 1952 (age 74); La Noria, Badiraguato, Sinaloa, Mexico
- Height: 1.89 m (6 ft 2 in)
- Occupation: Farmer, drug lord, trafficker

Status
- Penalty: 40 years (28 years served)
- Status: Extradited to the United States
- Added: April 12, 2018
- Caught: July 15, 2022
- Number: 518
- Captured

Rafael Caro Quintero (born October 24, 1952) is a Mexican former drug lord who co-founded the now-disintegrated Guadalajara Cartel with Miguel Ángel Félix Gallardo and other drug traffickers in the late 1970s. He is the brother of fellow drug trafficker Miguel Caro Quintero, founder and former leader of the defunct Sonora Cartel.

Having formed the Guadalajara Cartel in the 1970s, Caro Quintero worked with Gallardo, Ernesto Fonseca Carrillo, and Pedro Avilés Pérez by shipping large quantities of marijuana to the United States from Mexico. He was responsible for the kidnapping and torture of United States Drug Enforcement Administration (DEA) agent Enrique "Kiki" Camarena, Camarena's pilot Alfredo Zavala Avelar, the American writer John Clay Walker, and dentistry student Alberto Radelat in 1985. After the murders, Caro Quintero fled to Costa Rica but later that year was arrested and extradited to Mexico, where he was sentenced to 40 years in prison for murder. Following his arrest, the Guadalajara Cartel disintegrated, and its leaders were incorporated into the Tijuana Cartel, Sinaloa Cartel, and Juárez Cartel.

After serving 28 years in prison, Caro Quintero was freed in August 2013 after a state court concluded that he had been tried improperly. The day after his release, amid pressure from the United States government to re-arrest him, a Mexican federal court issued an arrest warrant against Caro Quintero. Caro Quintero was wanted for his involvement in drug trafficking as well as the 1985 murders. He was at large as a wanted fugitive in Mexico, the United States, and several other countries. On April 12, 2018, he was added to the FBI's Ten Most Wanted Fugitives list, replacing Jesus Roberto Munguia. The United States offered a 20-million-dollar reward for information leading to his capture, the highest value among fugitives on the list.

Caro Quintero lost his final appeal to avoid extradition to the United States on March 27, 2021. He was arrested in Mexico on July 15, 2022, and was extradited to the United States on February 27, 2025.

== Early life ==
Rafael Caro Quintero was born in La Noria, Badiraguato, Sinaloa, on October 24, 1952. His parents, Emilio Caro Payán and Hermelinda Quintero, had twelve children; he was the oldest son. His father worked in agriculture and grazing and died when Caro Quintero was 14. With his father's absence, he worked alongside his mother to care for his family.

At age 16, he left La Noria and settled in Caborca, Sonora, where he worked in livestock grazing. Two years later, he worked as a truck driver in Sinaloa. He also worked at a bean and corn plantation in Sinaloa before deciding to leave his home state altogether to join the drug trade in the neighboring state of Chihuahua.

== Criminal career ==
When he was a teenager, Caro Quintero allegedly began to grow marijuana on a small scale at the ranch owned by his brother Jorge Luis. In less than five years, Caro Quintero managed to buy several other ranches in the surrounding areas and began to amass larger amounts of money and influence.

He is said to have first worked for the drug traffickers Pedro Avilés Pérez and Ernesto Fonseca Carrillo before forming the Guadalajara Cartel with Miguel Ángel Félix Gallardo, Juan José Esparragoza Moreno, and others in the late 1970s. He has been cited as a pioneer of the drug trade in Mexico and has been described as one of the pre-eminent drug traffickers of his generation.

In 2025, U.S. prosecutors trying Caro Quintero claimed that even in the time after his 1985 arrest, Caro Quintero had in fact "continued directing cartel operations from behind bars in Mexico through his brother, Miguel Ángel Caro Quintero."

== Personal information ==
Date(s) of birth used	October 24, 1952; October 3, 1952; November 28, 1952; October 24, 1955; November 24, 1955; March 9, 1963
Place of birth	Badiraguato, Sinaloa, Mexico
Hair	Gray (formerly black)
Eyes	Brown
Height	1.95 m
Weight	159–170 pounds
Sex	Male
Nationality	Mexican
Language(s)	Spanish
Race	Mixed (Mestizo)

Caro Quintero is known to frequent the area of Badiraguato, Sinaloa, Mexico; he also has previous ties to Guadalajara, Jalisco, Mexico, and Costa Rica.

== Allegations of involvement in murders ==
=== John Clay Walker and Albert Radelat ===
Caro Quintero has been accused of ordering the abduction, torture, and murder of writer John Clay Walker and dentistry student Albert Radelat on January 30, 1985. According to the allegations, the two U.S. citizens were dining in a Guadalajara restaurant when they encountered Caro Quintero and his men as they accidentally walked into one of Caro Quintero's private parties.

Caro Quintero is alleged to have then ordered his men to seize the U.S. citizens and take them to a store room, where they were tortured with ice picks and interrogated. John Walker died on the scene from blunt force trauma to the head. Albert Radelat was still alive when he was wrapped in tablecloths, taken to a park near the city, and buried. The men's bodies were found six months later, buried at the San Isidro Mazatepec Park in Zapopan. The authorities believe that Caro Quintero had mistaken Walker and Radelat for U.S. undercover agents.

=== Enrique "Kiki" Camarena ===
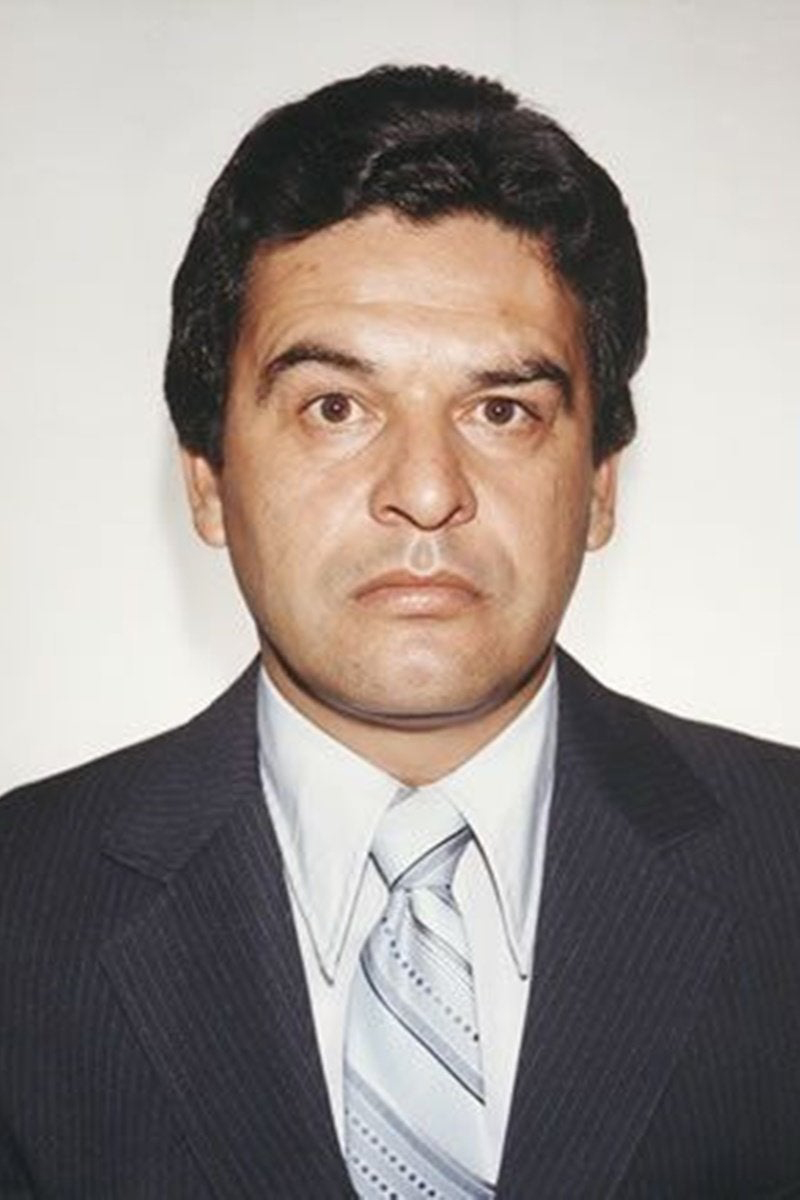
Enrique "Kiki" Camarena

Caro Quintero has also been accused of involvement in the murder of U.S. Drug Enforcement Administration (DEA) agent Enrique "Kiki" Camarena Salazar. In November 1984, the Mexican authorities raided a 1,000-hectare (2,500-acre) ranch known as El Búfalo in Chihuahua, owned by Caro Quintero. The authorities reportedly burned more than 10,000 tons of marijuana – totaling a loss of around $160 million. Camarena, who had been working undercover in Mexico, was said to be responsible for leading the authorities to the ranch. This allegedly prompted Caro Quintero and other high-ranking members of the Guadalajara Cartel to seek revenge against the DEA and Camarena. In retribution, Camarena and his pilot Alfredo Zavala Avelar were kidnapped in Guadalajara on February 7, 1985, and taken to a residence owned by Caro Quintero located at 881 Lope de Vega in the colonia of Jardines del Bosque, in the western section of the city, brutally tortured, and murdered. Caro Quintero left Mexico on March 9, 1985, with his associates and girlfriend, Sara Cristina Cosío Gaona. Mexican Judicial Police chief Armando Pavón Reyes, after receiving a US$300,000 bribe, reportedly allowed Caro Quintero to flee from the airport in Guadalajara in a private jet to seek refuge in Costa Rica. Pavón Reyes was fired shortly afterward and was charged with bribery and complicity in the Camarena murder.

== Philanthropy ==
Locals from Badiraguato, Sinaloa, Caro Quintero's hometown, recall that Caro Quintero was a benefactor in the 1980s. The town's mayor, Ángel Robles Bañuelos, said in a 2013 interview that Caro Quintero financed the construction of a 40-kilometre-long (25 mi) highway in Badiraguato and helped electrify the area. The mayor recalled that before the highway was built, it would take days for people to travel in and out of Badiraguato.

== Arrest and aftermath ==
On April 4, 1985, Caro Quintero was arrested in Alajuela, Costa Rica, while sleeping in a mansion just 800 metres (1/2 mi) from Juan Santamaría International Airport and extradited to Mexico on charges of involvement in Camarena's murder. He was sentenced to 40 years for the murder of Camarena and other crimes. The U.S. hoped to try Caro Quintero, and the DEA at the time still listed him as a wanted fugitive.

Caro Quintero was first imprisoned at the Federal Social Readaptation Center No. 1 maximum security prison in Almoloya de Juárez, State of Mexico. Even though Caro Quintero was to face a maximum of 199 years in jail, Mexican law during that time did not allow for inmates to serve more than 40.

In 2007, he was transferred to another maximum security prison, Puente Grande, in Jalisco. In 2010, a federal judge granted him the right to be transferred to another prison in Jalisco.

Caro Quintero's Guadalajara Cartel fell apart in the early 1990s, and its remaining leaders went on to establish drug trafficking organizations: in Tijuana, a large family formed the Tijuana Cartel; in Chihuahua, a group controlled by Amado Carrillo Fuentes formed the Juárez Cartel; and the remaining faction moved to Sinaloa and formed the Sinaloa Cartel under the traffickers Joaquín El Chapo Guzmán and Ismael El Mayo Zambada. Caro Quintero's brother, Miguel Caro Quintero, succeeded him and formed the Sonora Cartel, which branched out of the Sinaloa organization. By 2025, however, it was claimed that Miguel was in fact running the Sonora Cartel on Rafael's behalf, with Rafael Caro Quintero in fact leading it from prison. United States government believes that Caro Quintero ran his criminal empire behind bars through at least six of his family members. He created a front that laundered millions of dollars through a gas station, construction company, shoe factory, restaurant, and real estate development companies, among others.

=== Release ===
In the early hours of August 9, 2013, a court ordered the immediate release of Caro Quintero after he had served 28 years in prison. After a motion by a state judge and magistrate, Rosalía Isabel Moreno Ruiz, the Jalisco state court ruled that Caro Quintero was tried improperly in a federal courtroom for crimes that should have been treated at a state level. When Caro Quintero was given his 40-year sentence in the 1980s, he was convicted of murder (a state crime) and not for drug trafficking (a federal one). (Note: Though DEA agent Enrique Camarena Salazar worked for the U.S. Embassy in Mexico, he did not hold a "diplomatic post." If he did, his murder would have been considered a federal crime under Mexican law.) The magistrate ordered Caro Quintero's release after he had served time for other crimes he had committed throughout his reign as leader of the Guadalajara Cartel.

The release of Caro Quintero outraged the administration of U.S. President Barack Obama; the United States Department of Justice said they were "extremely disappointed" with the drug lord's release and stated that they were going to pursue Caro Quintero for pending charges in the United States. The Association of Former Federal Narcotics Agents expressed their disappointment but said that Caro Quintero's release occurred from the corruption that besets Mexico's judicial system. Mexico's Attorney General Jesús Murillo Karam also expressed his concern about the case, stating that he was "worried" about Caro Quintero's release and would investigate whether additional charges were pending in Mexico.

On August 14, 2013, a federal court granted the Office of the General Prosecutor (Spanish: Procuraduría General de la República, PGR) an arrest warrant against Caro Quintero after the United States government issued a petition to the Mexican government. Once the Mexican authorities re-arrest Caro Quintero, the U.S. government has a maximum limit of 60 days to present a formal extradition request. Mexico's Attorney General clarified, however, that if arrested, Caro Quintero cannot be extradited to the United States for the murder of Camarena because Mexican law prohibits criminals from being tried for the same crime in another country. U.S. lawyers, nonetheless, may argue that Caro Quintero's initial trial was illegitimate in the first place and that double jeopardy is not applicable. For Mexico to accept Caro Quintero's extradition, the United States has to present other criminal charges and agree that he would not face the death penalty if convicted because there are no laws for capital punishment in Mexico.

Caro Quintero was not publicly seen following his release from prison on August 9. There were rumors, however, that he had visited his hometown of Badiraguato, Sinaloa.

On March 7, 2018, the Mexican military used Black Hawk helicopters to search for Caro Quintero, dropping Marines into the mountain villages of La Noria, Las Juntas, Babunica, and Bamopa, all in the Badiraguato Municipality, but their hunt was unsuccessful. Caro Quintero was among the 15 most-wanted fugitives of Interpol. If arrested abroad, he would have been immediately extradited to Mexico. The U.S. government offered a $20 million bounty for his capture.

On May 26, 2020, Caro Quintero's lawyer filed for an appeal to drop not only more recent drug trafficking charges but also charges filed against him in 2015 regarding the kidnapping and qualified homicide of DEA agent Enrique "Kiki" Camarena and Mexican pilot Alfredo Zavala Avelar, stating Caro Quintero did not have any chance of obtaining the financial resources needed to survive a new trial. In court documents, the lawyer stated: "The plaintiff argues insolvency because he says he is more than 60 years old, is neither retired nor has a pension, and given the fact that he is a fugitive from the law, cannot work or perform any activity to earn money." The appeal was filed before the First Collegiate Court in Criminal Matters in Mexico City. Convicted former Guadalajara Cartel leader Ernesto Fonseca Carrillo, "Don Neto," is accused of conspiring with Caro Quintero in the murder of Camarena and the pilot but was later transferred to house arrest due to his advanced age.

In June 2020, it was revealed that the Sinaloa Cartel's Los Salazar affiliate was now a major figure in Sonora's drug trafficking business. However, Rafael and Miguel Caro Quintero had recently rejected offers to join the Sinaloa Cartel due to a fallout with the sons of imprisoned former leader Joaquín "El Chapo" Guzmán over leadership status. Despite this, both were on good terms with de jure Sinaloa Cartel leader Ismael "El Mayo" Zambada, who was now in poor health. Ex-DEA agent Mike Vigil continued to downplay Caro Quintero's role in the drug trafficking business and stated: "He will fall before he dies of old age."

A Mexican court dismissed suggestions that the murder of Enrique Camarena was purely a Mexican affair and opened the door to extradition on 1985 murder charges of the former DEA agent on March 27, 2021.

== Capture in 2022 ==
Caro Quintero was arrested in the settlement of San Simón, within the Choix Municipality of Sinaloa, on July 15, 2022, and later transferred to the maximum security federal prison Federal Social Readaptation Center No. 1, also known as the "Altiplano."

Simultaneous to the announcement of capture was a report of a Mexican Navy Black Hawk helicopter crashing in Los Mochis, Sinaloa. The crash killed fourteen personnel out of fifteen aboard. There were contradictory statements to the press: the Mexican Navy denied any connection, while an unnamed U.S. official tracking the raid told CBS News that the crash was linked to the operation but said Caro Quintero was not on board.

A press release from the Naval Secretariat of Mexico credited the capture of Caro Quintero in the bushes to "Max," a search and rescue dog.

Following these reports, United States Attorney General Merrick Garland issued a statement addressing both the capture of Caro Quintero in Choix and the downed helicopter in Los Mochis:

There is no hiding place for anyone who kidnaps, tortures, and murders American law enforcement. We are deeply grateful to Mexican authorities for their capture and arrest of Rafael Caro-Quintero. Today's arrest is the culmination of tireless work by DEA and their Mexican partners to bring Caro-Quintero to justice for his alleged crimes, including the torture and execution of DEA Special Agent Enrique "Kiki" Camarena. We will be seeking his immediate extradition to the United States so he can be tried for these crimes in the very justice system Special Agent Camarena died defending.

We join in mourning the 14 Mexican servicemembers who gave their lives in service to their country and extend our condolences to the loved ones they left behind.

The United States Ambassador to Mexico, Ken Salazar, also stated on the day of the capture:

Thank you to SEMAR and the Mexican government for capturing longtime drug trafficker Rafael Caro Quintero. This achievement is a testament to Mexico's determination to bring to justice someone who terrorized and destabilized Mexico during his time in the Guadalajara Cartel; and is implicated in the kidnapping, torture, and murder of DEA agent Kiki Camarena. Caro Quintero had eluded authorities for almost a decade, but justice has no expiration date. Holding Caro Quintero to account for his crimes is yet another win under the U.S./Mexico Bicentennial Framework for Security, Public Health, and Safe Communities. I look forward to even closer collaboration with our Mexican partners on our seguridad compartida.

Our thoughts and prayers are with the Mexican marines who gave their lives in service of their country, and the families and comrades they leave behind. Their bravery and sacrifice will be honored in our quest to bring about greater security for our two nations.

=== Extradition to United States ===
On February 27, 2025, the Mexican government extradited Caro Quintero and 28 other drug cartel figures to the United States to face criminal charges there. Caro Quintero would then be arraigned in a New York federal court in Brooklyn on February 28, 2025. During his arraignment, Caro Quintero entered a plea of not guilty to charges of running a criminal enterprise and murdering DEA agent Enrique "Kiki" Camarena. Notorious former Juárez Cartel leader Vicente Carrillo Fuentes, who is accused of arranging kidnappings and killings in Mexico, would be among those arraigned with Caro Quintero as well.

== Interviews ==
=== Proceso ===
On July 24, 2016, while still on the run, Caro Quintero gave an interview to Proceso magazine. In this interview, he claims he did not kill Enrique Camarena. Caro Quintero told the reporter that after his release from prison, he was visited (separately) by "El Chapo" Guzmán and Ismael "El Mayo" Zambada. He claims he told them he did not want to return to the business. He also told the reporter that he was no longer a drug trafficker, and peace was the only thing he desired.

=== Huffington Post ===
Huffington Post journalist Anabel Hernández visited Caro Quintero in his home in Mazatlán, Sinaloa, in April 2018. Despite having security guards, Caro Quintero was no longer able to live the lavish lifestyle he had when he was a major drug lord, was now living in a shabby mountain home, and appeared to be aging and frail. During the interview, Caro Quintero reiterated that he wanted to be left in peace and spent his days looking for drones. Caro Quintero also claimed to be suffering from a prostate-related illness and to have not been speaking to his wife, Diana, or any of his children. He denied allegations of being a senior leader in the Sinaloa cartel or being active in the drug trade.

Former DEA agent Mike Vigil, who previously led the DEA international operations and was highly active in investigating Mexican drug operations, described Caro Quintero as "a shell" of his former self and stated that it was "ludicrous" to look into allegations that he might have leadership in the Sinaloa Cartel. Vigil said, "Right now, we don't have any information that he is actually working with anybody." It was acknowledged that Caro Quintero's cousin Sajid, whom U.S. authorities arrested in October 2017 and who pled guilty to charges of drug trafficking and money laundering in a California courthouse on January 25, 2018, may have started these allegations to make a deal with prosecutors.

== In popular culture ==
Caro Quintero is portrayed in Narcos: Mexico by Tenoch Huerta. Benicio del Toro played Caro Quintero in NBC TV miniseries in 1990 The Drug Wars - The Camarena Story.

== See also ==
- Mexican drug war
