= Miguel Caro Quintero =

Mexican drug lord (born 1963)

Miguel Ángel Caro Quintero
- Born: Miguel Ángel Caro Quintero; 1963 (age 62–63); Caborca, Sonora, Mexico
- Occupation: Illegal drug trafficker
- Employer: Leader of Sonora Cartel
- Partner(s): Miguel Ángel Félix Gallardo, Rafael Caro Quintero
- Relatives: Rafael Caro Quintero

Notes
- Arrested in 2001 and extradited to U.S. on February 25, 2009.

Miguel Ángel Caro Quintero (born 1963) is a Mexican convicted drug lord and former leader of the Sonora Cartel, a defunct criminal group based in Sonora.

== Career ==
The United States Drug Enforcement Administration (DEA) states Caro Quintero created the Sonora Cartel from remnants of the Guadalajara Cartel, which was co-founded by his brother Rafael Caro Quintero. Rafael Caro Quintero was arrested in Costa Rica in 1985 in connection with the torture and death of DEA Special Agent Enrique "Kiki" Camarena Salazar.

In 1989 Miguel Ángel Félix Gallardo was arrested, causing the splintering of the Guadalajara Cartel into the Sinaloa Cartel, Tijuana Cartel and Sonora Cartel.

== Arrest and conviction ==
Caro Quintero was previously arrested in 1992 on charges of tax evasion, he was found not guilty, which the DEA attributes to the use of threats and bribes by Caro Quintero. While imprisoned, it is believed Caro Quintero is still running the Sonora Cartel, where he is being held on charges of racketeering, drug smuggling and money laundering. Caro Quintero was arrested in December 2001 in Los Mochis, Sinaloa. Prior to his arrest he has repeatedly stated he is innocent of the charges and has accused the DEA of pursuing a vendetta against him for his brother Rafael Caro Quintero's, alleged role in the death of DEA Special Agent Enrique Camarena. Miguel Caro Quintero is noted as having called into a radio station to profess his innocence, stating: "If I had a cartel, I'd have a lot of money and my brother wouldn't be there (in jail)"; he claimed to be an innocent rancher. He further stated he does not believe his brother was involved in the killing of the DEA agent.

Miguel Caro Quintero was arrested in Mexico in 2001 and charged with smuggling cocaine and marijuana into the U.S. for over 10 years. He was extradited to the U.S. on February 25, 2009. After his indictment Miguel admitted trafficking more than 100 tons of marijuana, and sending more than $100 million to Mexico. Miguel Caro Quintero pleaded guilty and he was sentenced on February 4, 2010, in Denver to 17 years in prison for conspiracy to distribute marijuana in Arizona and racketeering.

=== Release and deportation ===
On 20 July 2019, Caro Quintero was deported from the U.S. to Mexico after completing his sentence. He was deported through El Chaparral port of entry in Tijuana, Baja California. On the Mexican side, Caro Quintero was received by his family members. Mexican authorities did not issue an official statement regarding his status in Mexico.

== Later dispute over actual Sonora Cartel leadership status ==
In September 2025, it was reported that it was actually Caro Quintero's brother Rafael who was "directing cartel operations from behind bars in Mexico." According to claims made by U.S. prosecutors trying Rafael Caro Quintero, Rafael was in fact leading the Sonora Cartel "through his brother, Miguel Ángel Caro Quintero."

== See also ==
- Mexican drug war
