= Sonora Cartel =

Mexico based criminal cartel

Independent Cartel of Sonora
- Founded: 1987
- Founded by: Miguel Caro Quintero, Rafael Caro Quintero
- Founding location: Mexico
- Years active: 1987−2007
- Territory: Hermosillo, Agua Prieta, Guadalajara, Culiacán, Durango, Nayarit, Arizona, Texas, California, Nevada
- Ethnicity: mostly Mexican
- Criminal activities: Drug trafficking, money laundering, extortion, murder and arms trafficking
- Allies: Medellin Cartel, Cali Cartel, Guadalajara Cartel

The independent Cartel of Sonora , also known as Caro Quintero Organization, was a Mexico based criminal cartel.

== Background ==
The Sonora Cartel was considered by the United States Drug Enforcement Administration (DEA) to be one of the oldest and best-established cartels. The Sonora cartel was headed by Miguel Caro Quintero, brother to Guadalajara Cartel co-founder Rafael Caro Quintero, and operated out of Hermosillo, Agua Prieta, Guadalajara and Culiacán, as well as the Mexican states of Nayarit, Sinaloa and Sonora. The Sonora cartel's roots are in the Guadalajara Cartel, which dissolved after the 1989 arrest of its co-founder, Miguel Ángel Félix Gallardo. The Sonora cartel had direct links to Colombian drug cartels and operated routes into California, Arizona, Texas, and Nevada.

Rafael Caro Quintero was arrested in Costa Rica in 1985 in connection with the torture and death of DEA Special Agent Enrique "Kiki" Camarena. Miguel Caro Quintero would eventually be arrested in 2001, though it was believed he still maintained control over the organization from behind bars. By 2007, however, the Sinaloa Cartel had acquired the Sonora Cartel. Miguel Caro Quintero would later be extradited to the United States in 2009.

Despite their eventual releases from prison, the Caro Quintero brothers have lost influence in the Mexican drug business, with ex-DEA agent Mike Vigil even stating in the June 2020 that Rafael Caro Quintero "will fall before he dies of old age." Vigil also revealed that Sinaloa Cartel's Los Salazar affiliate was now a major figure in Sonora's drug trafficking business. However, both Rafael and Miguel Caro Quintero had recently rejected offers to join the Sinaloa Cartel due to a fallout with the sons of imprisoned former leader Joaquín Archivaldo Guzmán over leadership status. Despite this, both were said to be on good terms with de jure Sinaloa Cartel leader Ismael "El Mayo" Zambada, who was now in poor health. Rafael Caro Quintero would eventually be recaptured in Mexico in 2022, and later extradited to the United States in 2025.

The Sonora Cartel is believed to be one of the earliest cartels to begin shipping cocaine from Colombia, particularly from the Cali Cartel. The cartel was Operating out of northern central Mexico, the cartel was believed to smuggle drugs into Arizona, Texas and California from a network of ranches along the northern border region where the drugs are stored prior to shipment. The Sonora Cartel has been specifically linked to operating out of Hermosillo and Agua Prieta in Sonora, but also less so in Guadalajara in Jalisco, Culiacán in Sinaloa, and the States of Nayarit and Durango.

Acquired by the Sinaloa Cartel by 2007, the Sonora Cartel was reported as defunct at the time of Miguel Angel Caro Quintero's conviction in 2010. In 2025, it would also be reported that it was in fact actually Rafael Caro Quintero who was "directing cartel operations from behind bars in Mexico," and did so "through his brother, Miguel Ángel Caro Quintero."

== Miguel Caro Quintero ==
Miguel Caro Quintero was born in Caborca, Sonora, Mexico, in 1963. Previously arrested in 1992 on charges of tax evasion, he was found not guilty, which the DEA attributes to the use of threats and bribes by Caro Quintero. While imprisoned, it is believed Caro Quintero was still running the Sonora Cartel, where he is purging a prison sentence for racketeering, drug smuggling and money laundering. Caro Quintero was arrested in December 2001 in Los Mochis, Sinaloa. Prior to his arrest he repeatedly stated he is innocent of the charges and has accused the DEA of pursuing a vendetta against him for his brother, Rafael Caro Quintero's, alleged role in the death of DEA Special Agent Enrique Camarena. Miguel Caro Quintero is noted as having called into a radio station to profess his innocence, stating: "If I had a cartel, I'd have a lot of money and my brother wouldn't be there (in jail)" and claiming to be an innocent rancher. He further stated he does not believe his brother was involved in the killing of the DEA agent. In 2025, however, it was alleged that Miguel actually answered to his brother when running the cartel.

== Rafael Caro Quintero ==
Rafael Caro Quintero is the co-founder, with Miguel Ángel Félix Gallardo, of the Guadalajara Cartel and Sonora Cartel. He was arrested in Costa Rica on April 4, 1985, for the kidnapping, torture and murder of federal agent Enrique Camarena, and was also charged with violent crimes in aid of racketeering, possession with intent to distribute marijuana and cocaine, murder, continuing criminal enterprise.

== See also ==
- List of gangs in Mexico
- Mexican drug war
- Drug Enforcement Administration
- Guadalajara Cartel
- Mexico–US border
