= Jesús Gutiérrez Rebollo =

Mexican general sentenced to 40 years in prison

- Born: Jesús Gutiérrez Rebollo; 19 April 1934; Jonacatepec, Morelos, Mexico
- Died: 19 December 2013 (aged 79); Mexico City, Mexico
- Occupations: Military officer; Public official
- Title: Director of the National Institute for the Fight Against Drugs
- Term: December 1996 – February 1997
- Predecessor: Francisco Molina Ruiz
- Successor: Tito Valencia Ortiz
- Criminal charge: Protection to major drug dealers
- Criminal penalty: 40 years in prison
- Spouse: María Teresa Ramírez Casas (m. 1959–2013)
- Children: Teresa de Jesús Gutiérrez Ramírez; César Mario Gutiérrez Priego (adopted); Israel Gutiérrez Priego (adopted); Capt. Jesús Héctor Gutiérrez Rebollo Priego
- Military career
- Allegiance: Mexico
- Branch: Mexican Army
- Rank: Divisional general

Jesús Gutiérrez Rebollo (19 April 1934 – 19 December 2013) was a Mexican military general who was sentenced to 40 years in prison on multiple charges, including involvement in organized crime in the late 1990s.

== Biography ==
He was born in 1934 in Jonacatepec, Morelos. He was a career soldier who rose to the rank of Division General. He commanded the Fifth Military Region based in Jalisco, and worked for the office of the attorney general where he was appointed the country's top-ranking drug interdiction officer in 1996 as head of the Instituto Nacional para el Combate a las Drogas (INCD).

Gutiérrez had access to local intelligence and to intelligence provided to Mexico by the United States, including anti-drug investigations, wiretaps, interdiction programs, operations and informant identities.

=== Arrest and charges ===
The authorities began investigating Gutiérrez on February 6, 1997, after they received a tip that he had moved into an expensive apartment "whose rent could not be paid for with the wage received by a public servant." Mexican authorities also obtained a recording of Gutiérrez and drug lord Amado Carrillo Fuentes in which Gutiérrez allegedly discussed payments to be made to him in exchange for ignoring Carrillo Fuentes' illegal drug activities. Gutiérrez was taken into custody and charged with bribery, perverting the course of justice and facilitating the transportation of cocaine. Gutiérrez Rebollo later was convicted of aiding the drug lord Amado Carrillo Fuentes.

Early in 1997, he was fired from his post after an investigation showed that he had received bribes from the Juárez drug cartel. He was sentenced to 31 years 10 months 15 days imprisonment for misuse of weapons restricted to the Army. In 2007 he was sentenced by a federal court to a further forty years imprisonment and a fine of 24,716,829 pesos.

== Death ==
Gutiérrez died of brain cancer at the Central Military Hospital in Mexico City on 19 December 2013, while he was serving his 40-year sentence. He was 79.

== In popular culture ==
Traffic is a 2000 American crime drama film directed by Steven Soderbergh and written by Stephen Gaghan. It explores the intricacies of the illegal drug trade from a number of perspectives: a user, an enforcer, a politician and a trafficker, whose lives affect each other although they do not meet. The character General Arturo Salazar is closely modeled after General Jesús Gutiérrez Rebollo.

The telenovela El Señor de los Cielos is loosely based on the life of Amado Carrillo Fuentes and how he was helped by General Jesús Gutiérrez Rebollo.

Rebollo is depicted in Season Three of the Netflix series Narcos: Mexico, portrayed by José Zúñiga.
