= Ernesto Fonseca Carrillo =

Mexican drug lord (born 1930)

- Born: August 1, 1930 (age 96); Santiago de los Caballeros, Badiraguato, Sinaloa, Mexico
- Other name: Don Neto
- Occupation: Drug lord of the Guadalajara Cartel
- Known for: Illegal drug trade
- Height: 1.79 m (5 ft 10 in)
- Partner(s): Miguel Ángel Félix Gallardo, Rafael Caro Quintero, Amado Carrillo Fuentes

Notes
- Arrested on April 7, 1985. Released on April 10, 2025.

Ernesto Fonseca Carrillo (born August 1, 1930), commonly referred to by his alias Don Neto, is a Mexican drug lord and former leader of the Guadalajara Cartel, a defunct criminal group based in Jalisco. He headed the organization alongside Miguel Ángel Félix Gallardo, and Rafael Caro Quintero. Fonseca Carrillo was involved with drug trafficking since the early 1970s, primarily in Ecuador, and later moved his operations to Mexico.

Fonseca is the uncle of former Juárez Cartel leader, Amado Carrillo Fuentes.

== Early life ==
Ernesto Fonseca Carrillo was born in Badiraguato, Sinaloa. Sources disagree on his exact date of birth. According to the Drug Enforcement Administration (DEA), he was born in 1942. Other sources say he was born on August 1, 1930. His son, Gilberto Fonseca Caro was shot and killed on February 13, 1983, outside the Arena Coliseo in Tijuana following a boxing match.

== Drug trafficking ==
Fonseca and other narcotics traffickers created and operated El Búfalo (The Buffalo), a ranch in Chihuahua which is one of the largest marijuana plantations in history by square footage.

== Charges and arrest ==
The United States Drug Enforcement Administration (DEA) in 1982 indicted Fonseca in a money laundering operation in San Diego. Prior to the DEA receiving permission to wiretap the phones where Fonseca was thought to be hiding, Fonseca fled back to Mexico. On April 7, 1985, Fonseca was located in Puerto Vallarta by the Mexican Army, his villa was surrounded, and he surrendered.

Fonseca was later linked to, and admitted taking part in, events surrounding the 1985 murder of DEA agent Kiki Camarena, who was kidnapped and tortured by the Guadalajara cartel. Fonseca did not admit to killing Camarena, and stated he was outraged that the agent was beaten. Fonseca was found guilty of the murder by the Mexican judicial system, and was convicted and sentenced to 40 years in prison.

== House arrest ==
Fonseca was transferred from prison to house arrest in July 2016, because of his old age and declining health, with about nine years remaining on his 40-year sentence.

== In media ==
Fonseca-Carrillo is portrayed in Narcos: Mexico by Joaquín Cosío.

== See also ==
- Guadalajara Cartel
- Juarez Cartel
- Mexican drug war
- List of Mexicans
