= Héctor Luis Palma Salazar =

Mexican drug trafficker (born 1960)

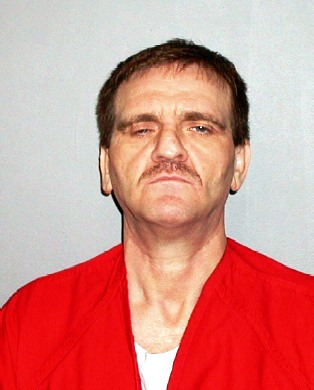
- Born: 29 April 1960 (age 66); Mocorito, Sinaloa, Mexico
- Other name: El Güero (the light-skinned)
- Occupation: Drug lord
- Employer: Sinaloa Cartel
- Successor: El Chapo
- Criminal status: Incarcerated
- Spouse: Guadalupe Leija Serrano
- Children: 2

Notes
- First arrest: 1978 in USA; Second arrest: June 23, 1995, in Mexico

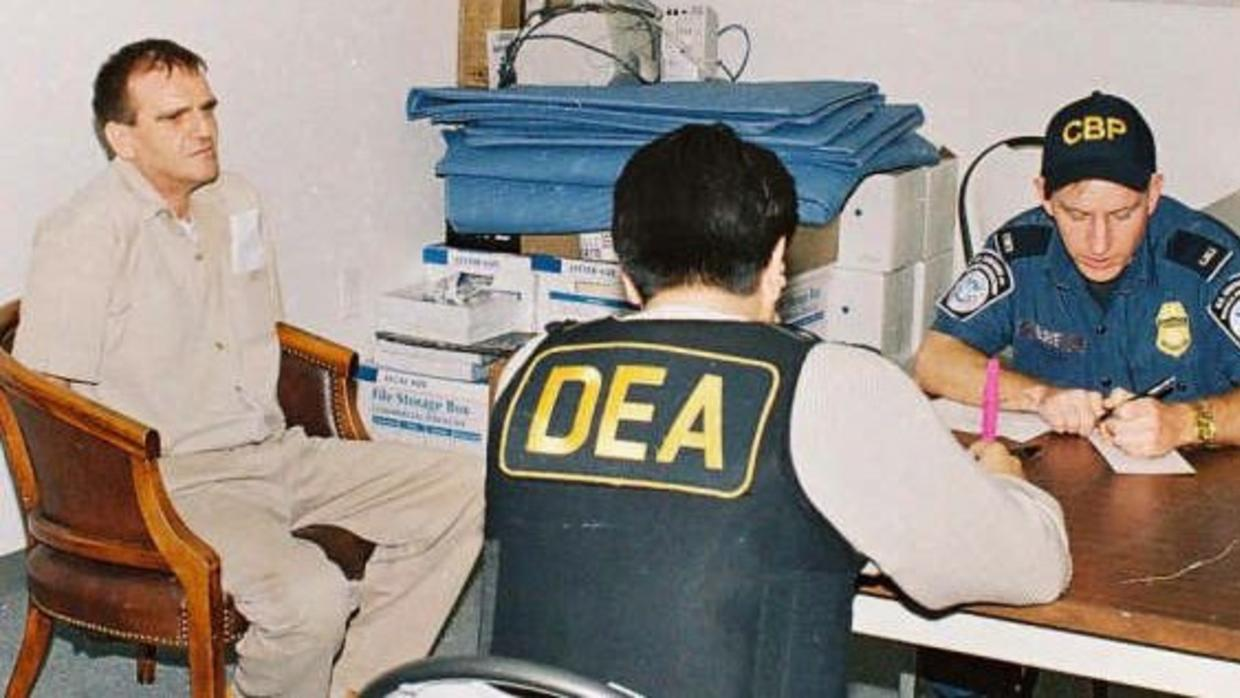
Héctor Palma Salazar being interrogated by the DEA

Héctor Luis Palma Salazar (born April 29, 1960), commonly known as "El Güero Palma", is a Mexican former drug trafficker and leader of the Sinaloa Cartel alongside Joaquín "El Chapo" Guzmán. After his boss Miguel Ángel Félix Gallardo ordered the brutal murder of his family, Palma set out to avenge them. Palma was arrested on June 23, 1995, and extradited to the United States, where he served a jail sentence until June 2016. He was then deported back to Mexico and charged with a double homicide for murdering two Nayarit police officers in 1995. Palma is currently incarcerated at the Altiplano Prison near Mexico City.

== Early life and career ==
Jesús Héctor Luis Palma Salazar was born in Noria de Abajo, Mocorito, Sinaloa, on April 29, 1960. He began as a car thief and eventually worked as a gunman for Miguel Ángel Félix Gallardo of the Guadalajara Cartel. Palma rose up the ranks and, along with Abelardo "El Lobito" Retamoza Machado, eventually became a co-leader of the cartel. He was associated with Joaquín "El Chapo" Guzmán.

Following the loss of a large cocaine shipment, which was blamed on El Chapo and Palma, in 1988 El Lobito Retamoza was killed but Palma spared. Following El Lobito's death, Palma contacted and created an alliance with Joaquín "El Chapo" Guzmán of the Sinaloa Cartel.

Palma splintered from the group, which was handed down to Felix Gallardo's nephews in Tijuana, who later formed the Tijuana Cartel (also known as the Arellano Félix Organization). Palma, along with a Venezuelan trafficker named Rafael Enrique Clavel, the one-time boyfriend of Palma's sister Minerva Palma, began operating their own cartel.

=== First arrest and family's murder ===
In 1978, Palma was arrested in Arizona for drug trafficking and sentenced to eight years in a U.S. prison. Upon his release, he discovered that his wife, Guadalupe Leija Serrano, had run off with Clavel and taken her and Palma's two children.

Clavel forced Guadalupe to withdraw US$7 million from a bank account and later decapitated her and shipped her head back to Palma. The two young children, Jesús (aged 5) and Nataly (aged 4), were taken to Venezuela and thrown off a bridge named 'Puente de la Concordia', located in the city of San Cristóbal, Táchira, about 40 kms from the border with Colombia.

Soon afterward, Clavel began working for the Tijuana Cartel. In retaliation, Palma executed Gallardo's lawyer and Clavel's three children. Clavel would later be arrested and soon be murdered in jail by an inmate on Palma's orders.

Palma returned to trafficking, this time with the Sinaloa Cartel, sharing leadership with Adrián Palma Reyes and Joaquin Guzmán Loera (El Chapo), who would later become the leader of the Sinaloa cartel while Adrian Palma Reyes became a lieutenant of Guzman and leader of the Badiraguato plaza in Sinaloa with the Reyes family as his armed wing.

=== Second arrest ===
Palma was arrested on June 23, 1995, after a 12-seat Lear jet on which he was flying to attend a wedding party crash-landed. He was traveling from Ciudad Obregón, Sonora, to Guadalajara, Jalisco, when the jet was diverted and unable to locate a new landing strip in time. Palma survived the crash-landing and was later arrested by Mexican military officers; he originally evaded capture by traveling in full uniform as a Federal Judicial Police (PJF) officer complete with identification and an armed caravan of PJF personnel.

After serving nineteen years in the Atwater Federal Prison, Palma was extradited back to Mexico in June 2016, where he was charged with a double murder of police officers in Nayarit in 1995. He is currently incarcerated at the Altiplano Prison near Mexico City.

== Kingpin Act sanction ==
On 2 June 2003, the United States Department of the Treasury sanctioned Palma under the Foreign Narcotics Kingpin Designation Act (sometimes referred to simply as the Kingpin Act) for his involvement in drug trafficking, along with six other international criminals and three entities. The act prohibited U.S. citizens and companies from doing any kind of business activity with him and virtually froze all his assets in the U.S.

== Corruption ==
Palma had managed to insert himself into the depths of the Mexican Federal Judicial Police (PJF), evading detection by posing as one in complete uniform, with identification, and traveling in a heavily armed caravan of PJF officers. It was later discovered he was able to evade capture by staying at the home of the local police commander.

The corruption within the police force has been documented to have spread to the judicial system. By bribing judges, the Sinaloa Cartel has repeatedly evaded prosecution. In 2004, 18 men were arrested in possession of 28 machine guns, 2 hand guns, 223 magazines, 10,000 rounds of ammunition, 12 grenade launchers, 18 hand grenades, smoke grenades and bulletproof vests. The men were set free by Judge José Luis Gómez Martínez, who said there was no evidence they were part of any criminal organization.

== In popular culture ==
In Narcos: Mexico seasons 1–3, Palma is played by Gorka Lasaosa.

A character based on Palma was featured in the 2017 television series El Chapo.

== See also ==
- Merida Initiative
- Mexican drug war
- War on drugs
