= List of the tallest statues in Mexico =

Mexico is a country in the southern part of North America. The nation is home to hundreds of statues, sculptures, and monuments, the tallest being the Cristo de Chiapas at 62 m (203 ft), with very few reaching 20 m (66 ft).

== Statues over 20 m ==
Statue	Picture	Depicts	Location	State	Height	Completed	Notes						
Statue	Picture	Depicts	Location	State	Height	Completed	Notes	Cristo de Chiapas	Jesus	Tuxtla Gutiérrez	Chiapas	62 m (203 ft)	2011
Guerrero Chimalli		An Indigenous warrior holding a Chīmalli	Chimalhuacán	State of Mexico	50 m (160 ft)	2014	The sculpture is placed on a 10-meter-tall (33-foot) plinth.						
Monumento a José María Morelos		José María Morelos	Janitzio	Michoacán	47.75 m (156.7 ft)	1936							
Cristo Rey		Jesus	Pachuca	Hidalgo	33 m (108 ft)	1996							
Cristo Rey		Jesus	Tlalnepantla de Baz	State of Mexico	33 m (108 ft)	1981							
Virgen Monumental		Our Lady of Guadalupe	Ocuilan	State of Mexico	33 m (108 ft)	2017							
Christ the Redeemer		Jesus	Tihuatlán	Veracruz	31.5 m (103 ft)	2007							
Cristo de la Paz		Jesus	Tabasco	Zacatecas	31 m (102 ft)	2023							
El Danzante Yaqui		A Yaqui dancer	Cajeme	Sonora	30 m (98 ft)	2010							
El Cristo Roto		Jesus	San José de Gracia	Aguascalientes	28 m (92 ft)	2006							
San Judas Tadeo de Badiraguato		Jude the Apostle	Badiraguato	Sinaloa	25 m (82 ft)	2023							
Cristo de los Álamos		Jesus	Tijuana	Baja California	23.3 m (76 ft)	2000							
Christ of the Sacred Heart		Jesus	Rosarito	Baja California	23 m (75 ft)	2007							
Monumental Virgen de Guadalupe		Our Lady of Guadalupe	Xicotepec	Puebla	23 m (75 ft)	2010							
Cristo de las Noas		Jesus	Torreón	Coahuila	21.8 m (72 ft)	1983							
Cristo Rey		Jesus	Silao	Guanajuato	20 m (66 ft)	1940							

== See also ==
- List of tallest statues
- List of statues
- List of tallest buildings in Mexico
