= Cristo de Chiapas =

Monumental cross in Chiapas, Mexico

Glorioso Cristo de Chiapas
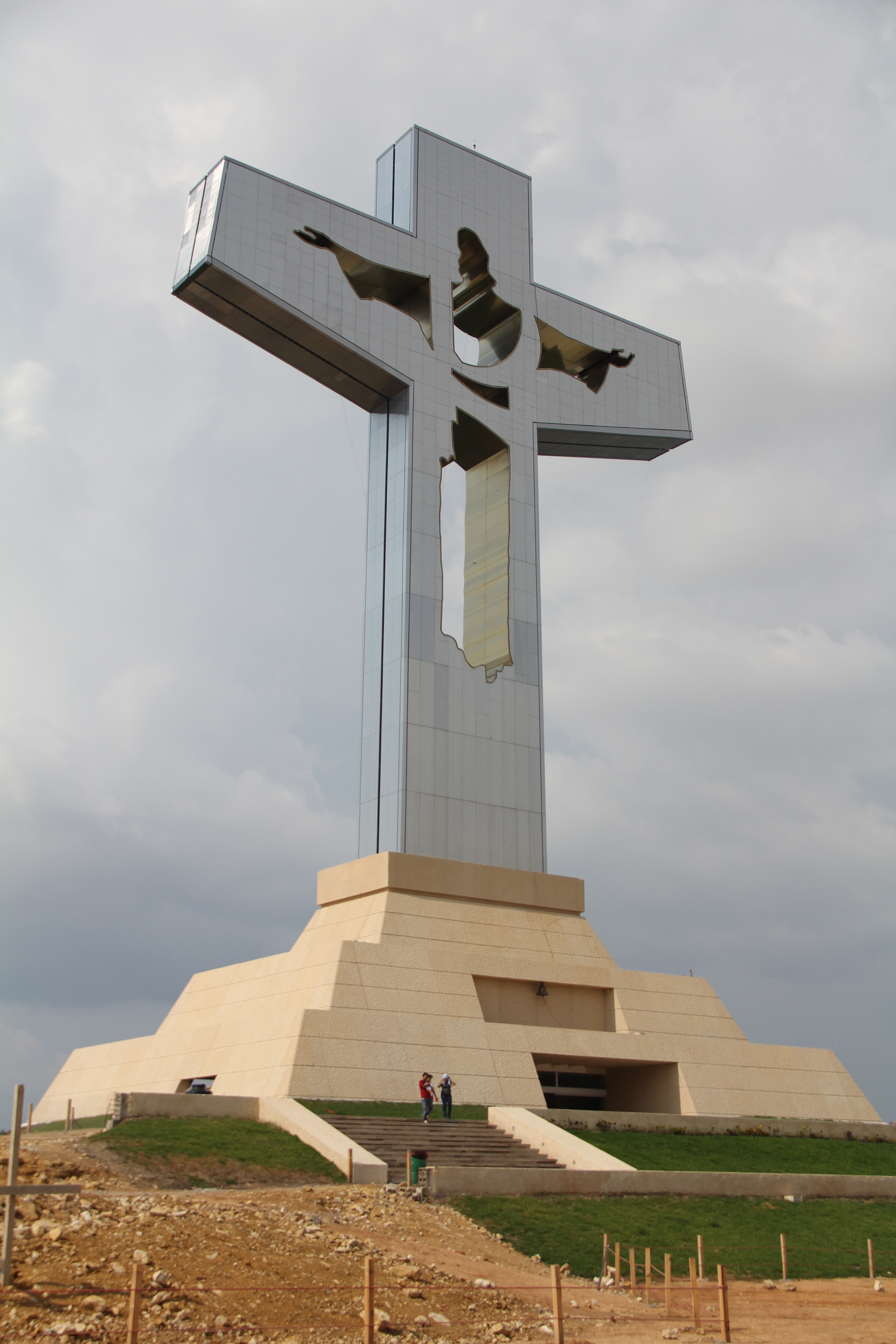
- View of Glorioso Cristo de Chiapas

Religion
- Affiliation: Christianity

Location
- Location: Tuxtla Gutiérrez, Chiapas, Mexico
- Interactive map of Glorioso Cristo de Chiapas
- Coordinates: 16°43′12″N 93°7′12″W

Architecture
- Architect: Jaime Latapí López
- Type: Monumental cross
- Groundbreaking: 29 April 2007
- Completed: 6 December 2011

Specifications
- Width: 34 metres (112 ft)
- Height (max): 62.3 metres (204 ft)
- Materials: Steel and concrete

The Glorioso Cristo de Chiapas (Glorious Christ of Chiapas), also known as the Cristo de Copoya, is a 62-metre (203 ft) tall monumental cross located in the Mexican state of Chiapas. The cross, which features a profile of Jesus Christ in its interior, was designed by Mexican architect Jaime Latapí López. Construction of the Cristo de Chiapas began in 2007 and was completed in December 2011.

== History ==
Chiapas governor Juan Sabines Guerrero was an early supporter of the project, which he claimed would be an important tourist destination for Tuxtla Gutiérrez and would serve as a "symbol of the city." Sabines's wife, María Isabel Aguilera de Sabines, served as the first president of the project's board of trustees.

Funding for the project was donated by local parishioners and businessmen. The board of trustees sold t-shirts, hats, and even crypt plots in order to raise money. Donation jars were placed in stores and businesses in the city. The total cost of the project was originally projected to be around Mex$60 million.

The cornerstone was laid on 29 April 2007 in a ceremony featuring governor Sabines and Rogelio Cabrera López, the archbishop of Tuxtla. Construction of the base began in September 2007.

The project was plagued by delays from the beginning, often due to a lack of funding. In 2009, the board of trustees treasurer Felipe de Jesús Granda Pastrana guaranteed that the project would be completed by 16 September 2010, in time for the country's bicentennial celebration, however that deadline was missed. In July 2011, Granda announced that the project had received an additional Mex$3 million and that the first stage of construction would be finished by September 2011.

The cross was finally inaugurated on 6 December 2011. The first stage of construction (including the cross itself and a chapel) cost a total of Mex$90 million. A second stage of construction would add commercial and tourism infrastructure including a lobby area, restaurant, museum, classroom, gardens and new roads to the site.

Pope Francis blessed the statue while on a trip to Mexico in 2015.

== Architecture ==
The cross is located on a hill to the south west of Tuxtla Gutiérrez, the capital city of Chiapas. The structure, which is made of stainless steel and concrete, includes a chapel beneath the cross for holding Catholic ceremonies. The cross was designed by Mexican architect Jaime Latapí López.

At a height of 62 metres (203 ft), the Cristo de Chiapas is the largest cross in Mexico. It is 32 metres (105 ft) taller than the Christ the Redeemer statue in Rio de Janeiro, Brazil. Measured arm to arm, the structure is 34 metres (112 ft) long. It weighs 180 tonnes.

== See also ==
- Cruceta del Vigía
- Cristo de las Noas
- List of tallest crosses in the world
- List of the tallest statues in Mexico
