= List of crosses =

List of crosses may refer to:

- Christian cross variants
- Crosses in heraldry
- List of tallest crosses in the world
