= Kragujevac Cross =

Monument in Kragujevac, Serbia

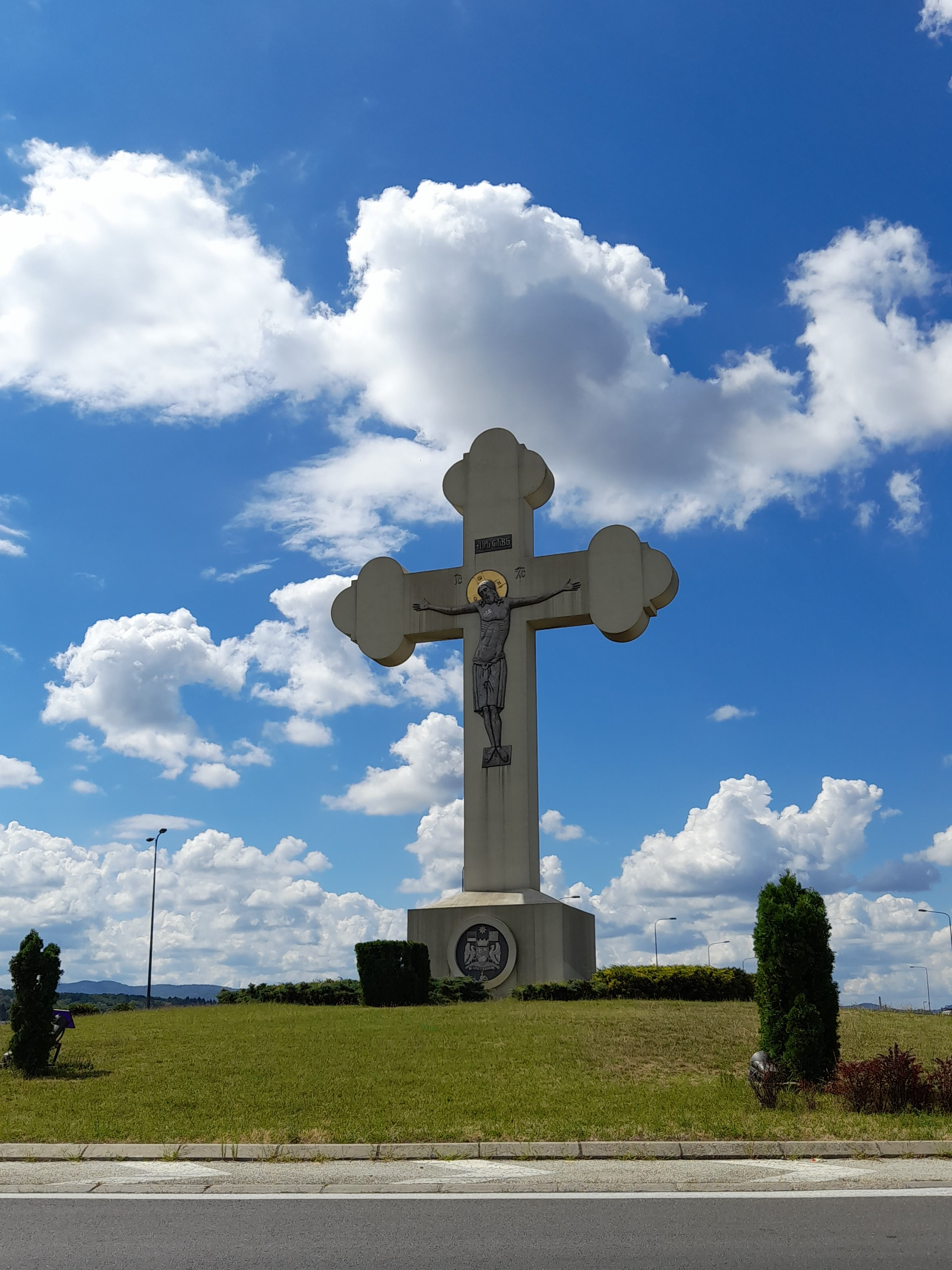
Cross of Saint George, Kragujevac, Serbia

The Cross of St. George (Serbian: Ђурђевдански крст), commonly known as the Kragujevac Cross, is a monumental cross at the entrance of the city of Kragujevac, Serbia. It is 18 metres high and 11 metres wide, with the Crucifixion of Jesus on one side, and the icon of St. George and the Dragon on the other. It was blessed by Serbian Patriarch Irinej on July 21, 2010.
