= Veneration of Judas Thaddaeus in Mexico =

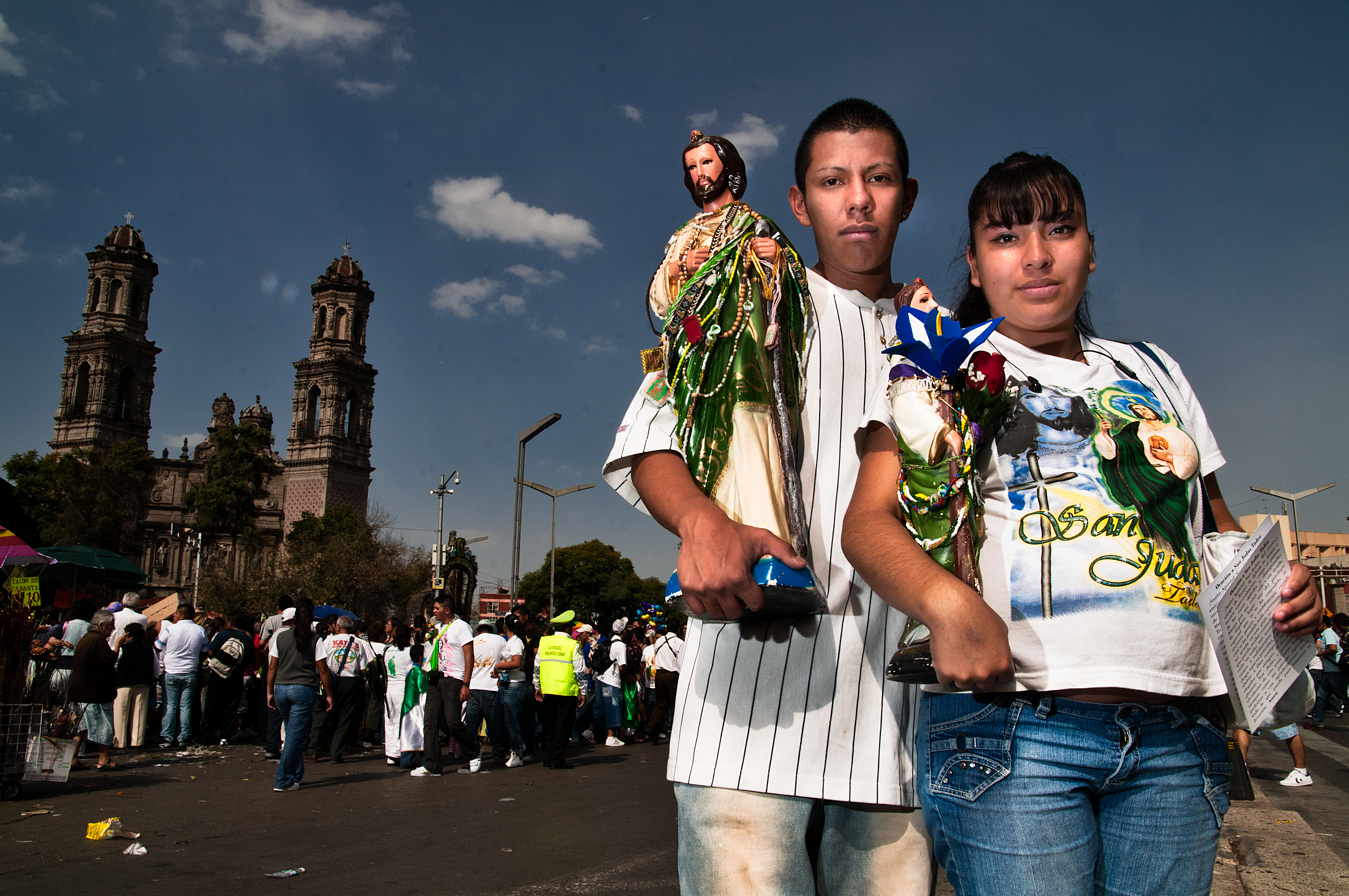
Two devotees with images at the San Hipolito Church in Mexico City

The veneration of Judas Thaddaeus in Mexico has taken on importance since the mid 20th century, especially in Mexico City. The center for this veneration is at the San Hipólito Church, near the historic city center, for centuries the only church with any space devoted to this saint. Although the church remains named for its original patron, the image of Saint Judas Thaddaeus (Spanish: San Judas Tadeo) has been moved to the main altar. The church and some other locations in Mexico, receive thousands of devotees, mostly coming on the 28th of each month, especially October 28, the saint's feast day. The saint is officially associated with difficult circumstances, but more recently has been associated with delinquents, with the idea that the saint hears the petitions of both the good and the bad. Mexico City, especially its poorer areas, is filled with thousands of street shrines to San Judas Tadeo. Other areas with significant numbers of devotees include Michoacán, the State of Mexico, Mexicali and Monterrey.

== The saint ==
Judas Thaddaeus, commonly known as Saint Jude (or San Judas Tadeo in Spanish), was one of the Twelve Apostles. A relative of Jesus, he was one of his first followers and after Christ's death, became an evangelizer. He was martyred along with Simon the Zealot, by decapitation with a hatchet. Depictions of this saint, especially in Mexico, include a medallion on the chest with Christ’s image (representing evangelism), a staff and a hatchet (reminder of martyrdom). He is considered to be a direct intercessor to Jesus Christ as a saint to appeal to in difficult and desperate situations and is credited with many miracles. Petitions often include help with personal problems, legal problems, work issues and family. He is also invoked to help find lost objects. Sometimes the petition can simply be that the situation does not get worse.

== Aspects of his veneration in Mexico ==
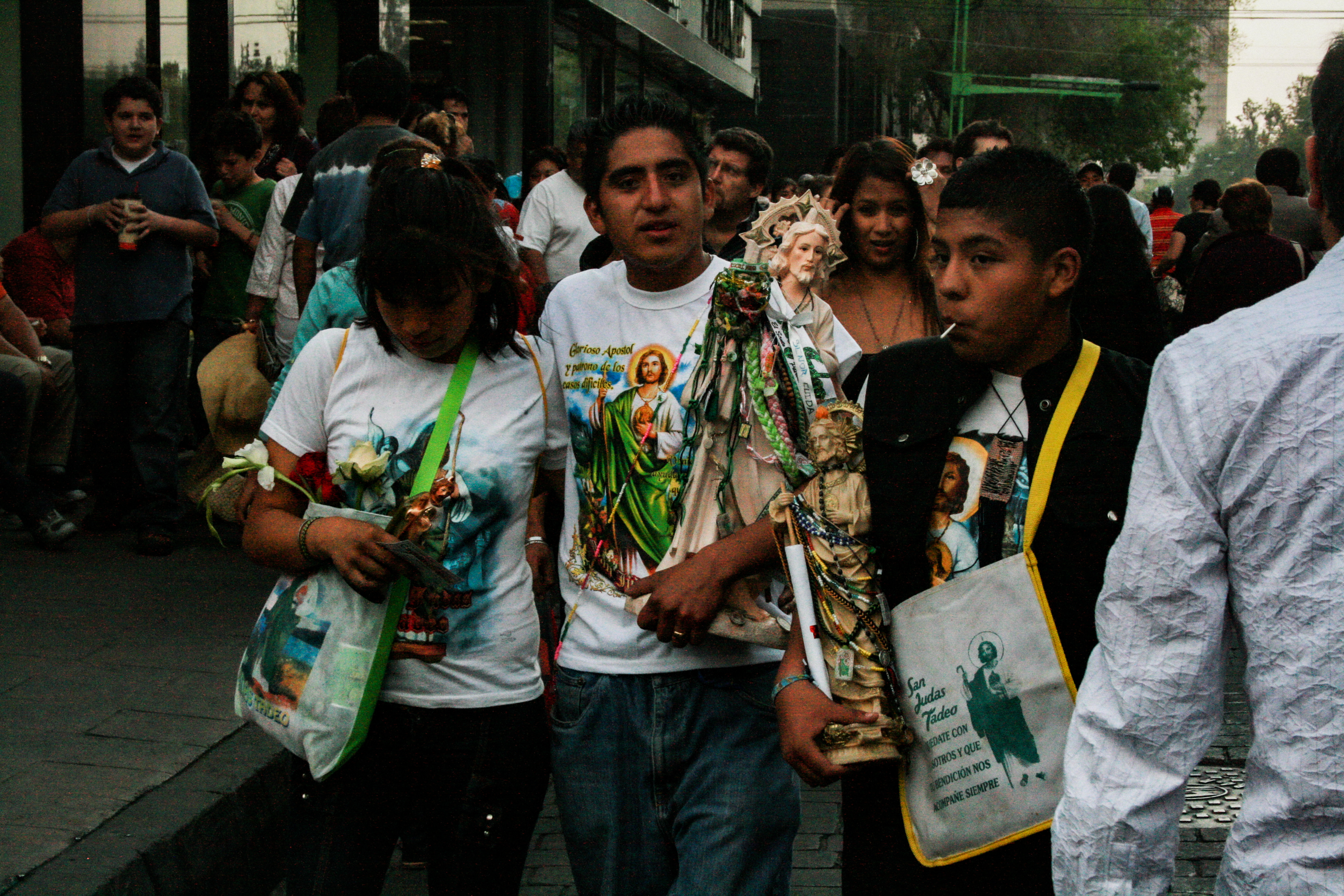
Devotees in procession in Mexico City

Devotion to Judas Thaddaeus is widespread in Mexico City and some other areas, especially among the poor, often referred to by the familiar diminutive San Juditas. Devotees also include police, truck drivers, manual laborers and some upper-class people such as college students, politicians, businesspeople and artists. The popularity of this saint is growing, especially among young people. Images can be seen at secular, popular events for youth, especially on the 28th of the month.

This saint has also become popular with drug abusers and delinquents, with some even petitioning the saint to get away with a crime. According to Father José de Jesús Aguilar Valdés, a director of the radio and television service of the Archdiocese of Mexico, the association of the saint with criminals came from the illegal copying of his image from prints in Italy, which reversed the hand on which his staff is held from right to left. As the left often symbolizes evil in Catholicism, folk belief has Judas Tadeo as the saint of both the good and the bad, with idea that sometimes the "good" can act worse than the "bad." Devotees of the saint may also venerate Santa Muerte and Jesús Malverde.

However, unlike Santa Muerte and Jesús Malverde, veneration of Judas Thaddaeus receives support from the Catholic Church as a manifestation of folk religion in Latin America. The archdiocese celebrates the saint's day, and clarifies that Judas Thaddaeus is not a saint for delinquency or drug trafficking, nor related in any way to Santa Muerte. The Church considers these beliefs incompatible with doctrine. Although the Church denies this, UNAM researcher Héctor Castillo Berthier states that the Church uses this veneration to combat that of Santa Muerte. Josué Tinoco, a psychologist at the Universidad Autónoma Metropolitana, states that the veneration is an option for marginalized youth who want to keep in the Catholic faith.

== San Hipólito Church, Mexico City ==
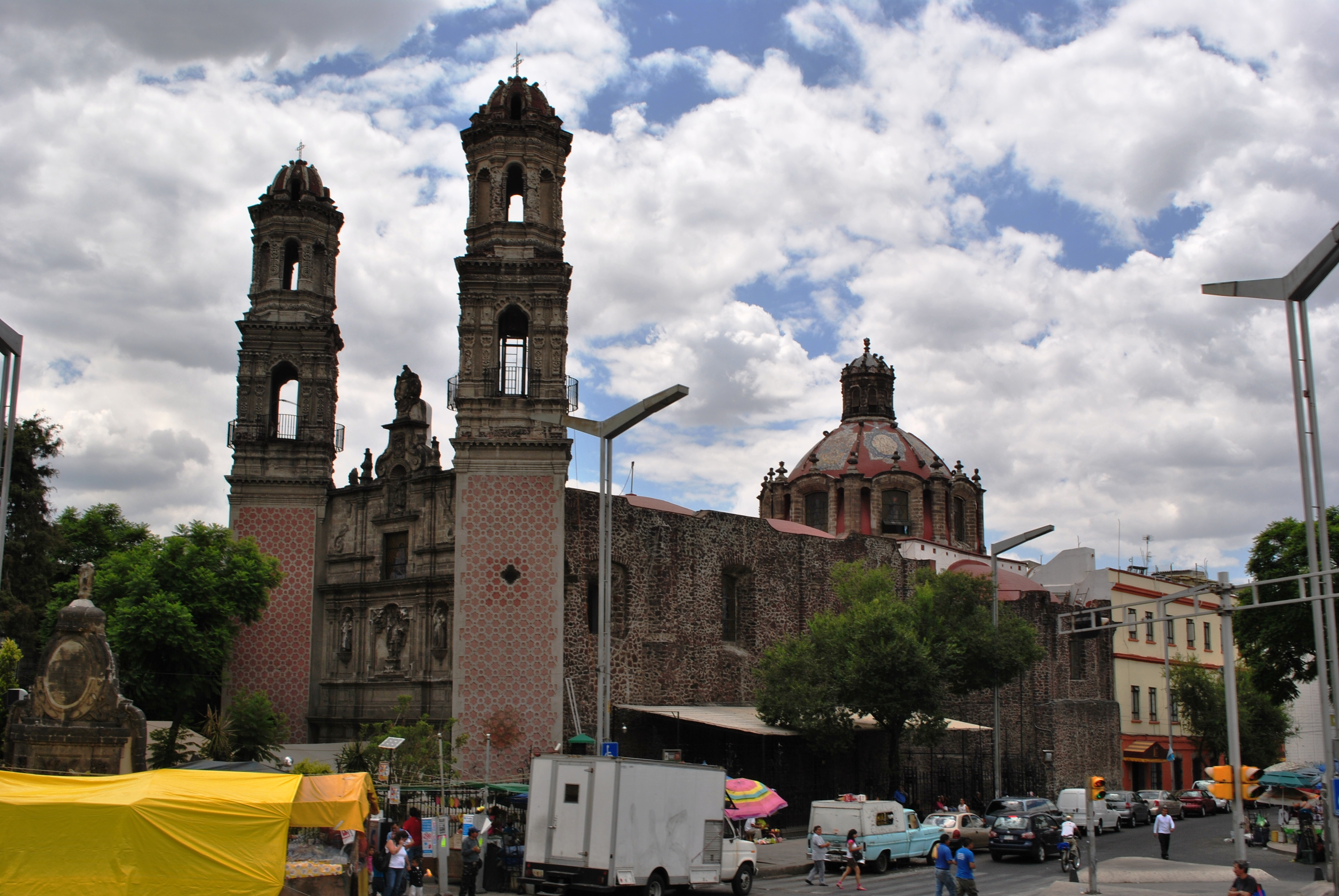
San Hipólito Church, Mexico City

The San Hipólito Church in the historic center of Mexico City is the most important center of the veneration of this saint. For three hundred years, it was the only church with a shrine to him. However, as Judas Thaddaeus grew in popularity, its image in this church also became more important until the image was elevated to the main altar in 1982. Although the church is officially dedicated to San Hipólito and maintains the name, it is the center of veneration of Judas Thaddaeus.

The church is one of few which allows mass participation by drug addicts and those who have had problems with the law. Located in the Cuauhtémoc borough of Mexico City, with high crime rates, most who visit this church are poor, marginalized and young, generally between thirteen and twenty years of age. Most are also male although groups of females can be seen, and most of the young people attend with their group or gang (called “bandas” in Mexican Spanish). On the 28th of each month, masses are held in honor of this saint, which bring people to the church from all over the city. Most use public transportation but some will walk the entire way to the church, starting the night before. Most attendees have images of the saint with them from their homes, which can be anywhere from 20 cm to over a meter and a half in height, made of various materials. Those with small children sometimes dress them as the saint. Many devotees also carry red and white roses. For this monthly event, police are assigned to the area around the church, mostly to redirect traffic.

October 28 is the saint's feast day, and the crowds in and around the church are much larger, reaching 80,000 to 90,000 people attending over fifteen masses. Celebrations begin the night before when devotees begin to arrive, mostly staying on Hidalgo Avenue, closed for the occasion. As time passes, these crowds will block Paseo de la Reforma as well, one of the city's main arteries. Police presence for this event numbers in the hundreds. On the feast day proper, the area around the church is one of the most crowded spots in the city, despite the cold temperatures. At 6am on October 28, the day begins with the singing of Las Mañanitas

The church is surrounded by vendors year-round, selling candles, rosaries, other religious objects, t-shirts, candies and food. On the 28th of the month, vendors sell at least 2,000 figures of the saint to visitors.

== Other centers of veneration ==
Mexico City is the main center of veneration to Judas Thaddaeus, with thousands of small street shrines, especially in older, lower-class neighborhoods such as Colonia Obrera. However, other areas with significant numbers of devotees include Michoacán, the State of Mexico, Puebla, Nuevo León and Baja California. Veneration of this saint is an important event on his feast day of October 28 in Mexicali and at the church dedicated to him on the Colonia Héctor Mayagoitia in the city of Durango. The saint has a sanctuary in the center of the city of Monterrey, which receives thousands of visitors each year, up to 75,000 for October 28. The sanctuary petitioned for and received a small piece of bone from the remains of Judas Thaddaeus buried in Rome.

The largest statue of Judas Thaddaeus in the world is in Badiraguato, Sinaloa. It was inaugurated on September 26, 2023.
