= San Judas Tadeo de Badiraguato =

Statue in Badiraguato, Sinaloa

Coordinates: 25.3611°N 107.5409°W

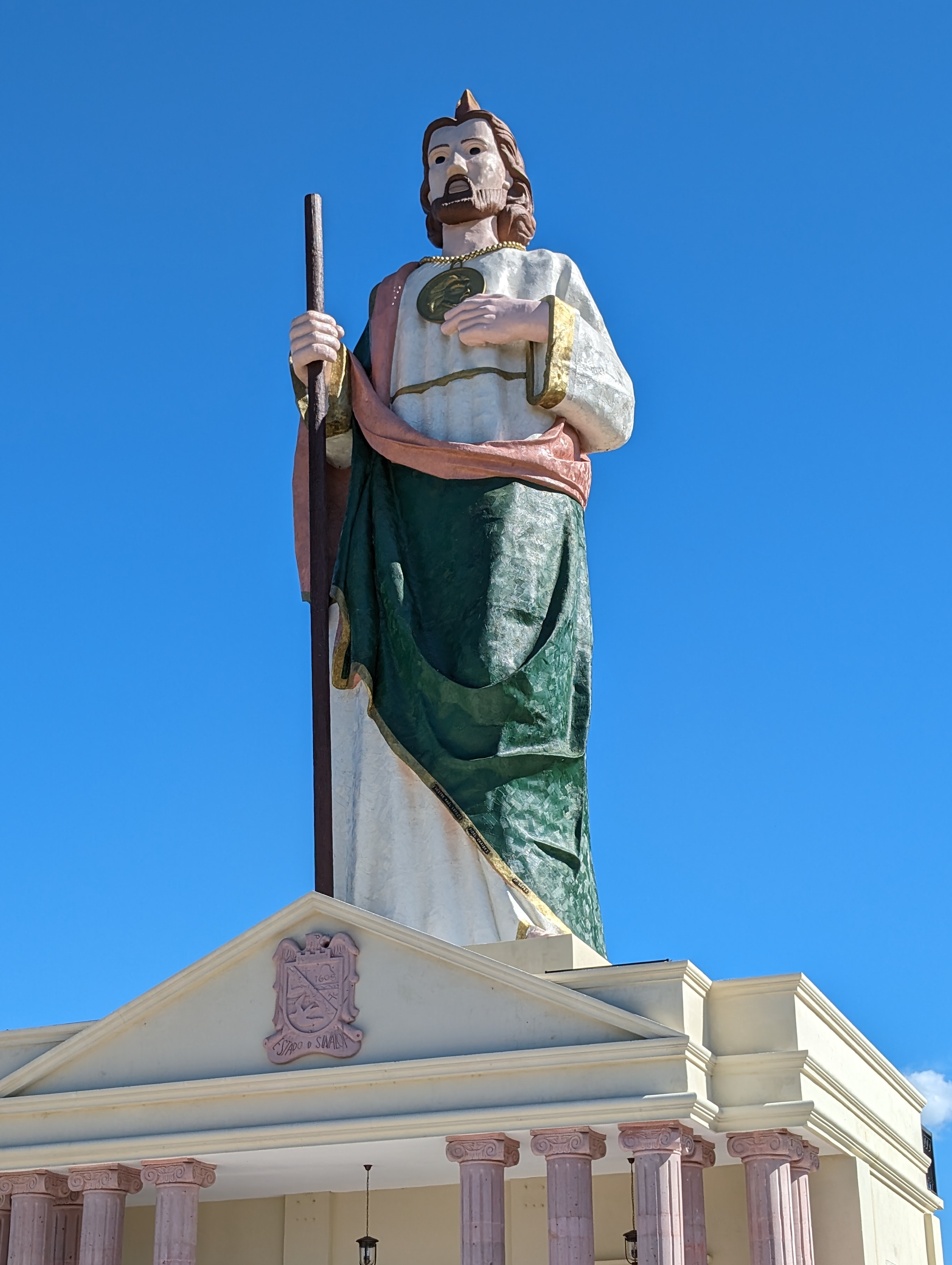

Religion
- Affiliation: Roman Catholic

Location
- Location: Badiraguato, Sinaloa, Mexico
- Interactive map of San Judas Tadeo de Badiraguato

Architecture
- Architect: Fidel Cháidez
- Type: Statue
- Completed: 26 Sep 2023
- Height (max): 25 metres (82 ft)

San Judas Tadeo de Badiraguato is a statue of Judas Thaddaeus in the municipality of Badiraguato, Sinaloa, Mexico. It is the largest statue of Apostle Jude Thaddaeus in the world.

== Construction ==
It was designed and created by Sinaloan sculptor Fidel Cháidez in Culiacán, Sinaloa. The statue and temple it sits on, has an approximate height of 28 meters. The statue by itself measures a height of about 25 meters. It is located at the highest point of Badiraguato at the Parque Mirador. The statue took about a year. and half to complete. It was moved in sections from Culiacán and assembled in Badiraguato. The statue was modeled in clay and cast in epoxy resin.

== History ==
The statue was inaugurated on September 26, 2023, by the Governor of Sinaloa Rubén Rocha Moya and the Mayor of Badiraguato José Paz López Elenes. It is the ninth largest statue in Mexico, and the largest statue of Jude Thaddaeus in the world. The statue was selected by the people of Badiraguato, who chose the statue of Judas Thaddaeus over depictions of the Virgin Mary and Jesus Christ. The monument was donated by an unnamed individual.

Jude Thaddaeus is regarded as an important figure in the Catholic faith and is known as the saint of lost causes. The saint is one of the most venerated saints in Mexico and is historically associated with criminals and organized crime.

== See also ==
- List of the tallest statues in Mexico
