= Judas the Zealot =

Apostle

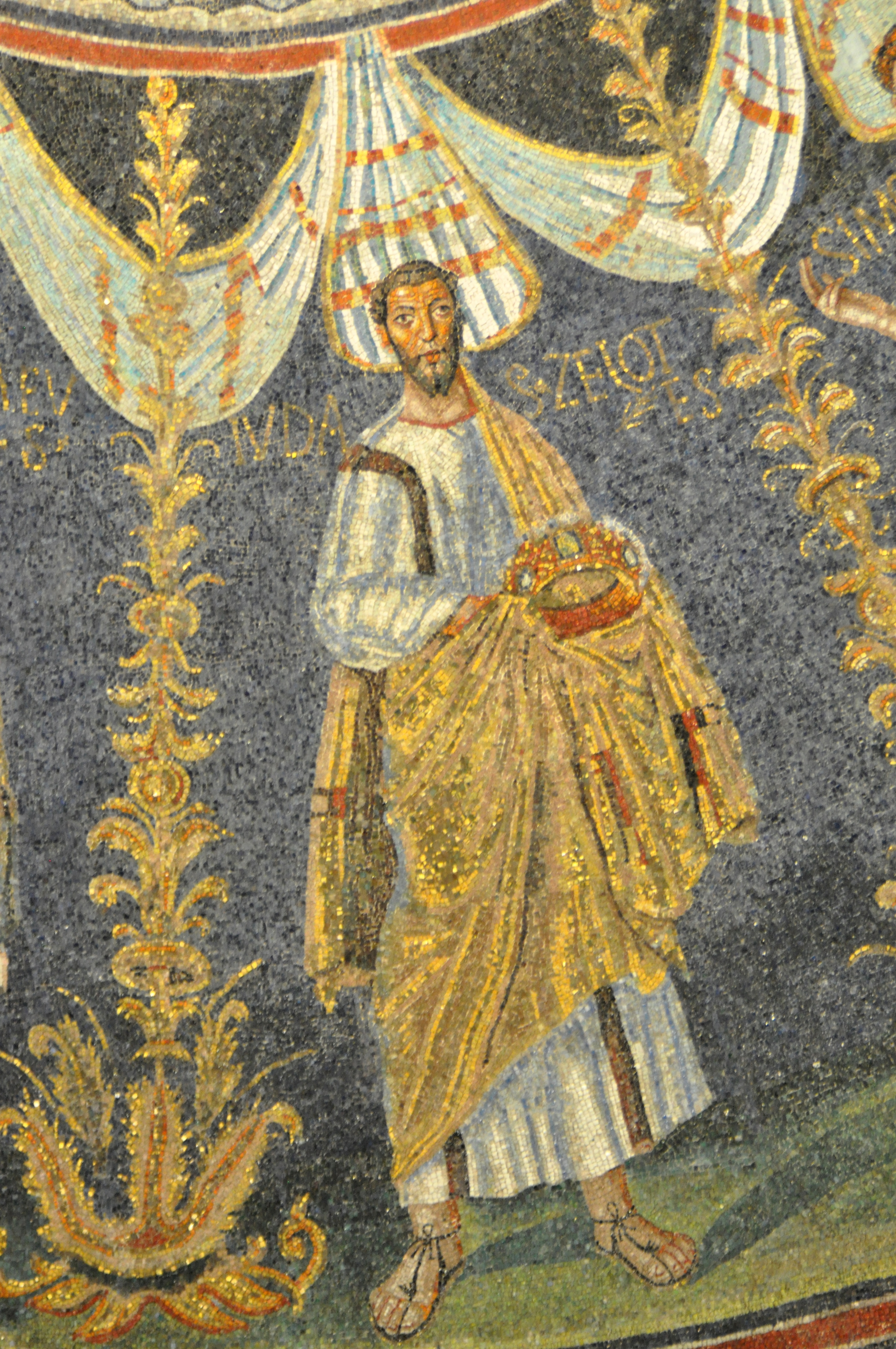
Mosaic showing apostle "Iudas Zelotes" in the Neonian Baptistry in Ravenna, Italy.

The name Judas the Zealot (Judas Zelotes) is mentioned in the Epistle of the Apostles (Epistula Apostolorum), written in the 2nd century. He is usually identified with the Apostle Simon the Zealot or with the Apostle Jude.

Bruce Metzger, in his Textual Commentary on the Greek NT, comments on Matthew 10:3:

"The name Judas Zelotes in several Old Latin manuscripts (compare also the same name in the fifth century mosaic in the great Baptistry at Ravenna) may be a further assimilation to the previous name in Luke's list, "Simon who was called the Zealot.""
