= Rincón De Los Montes =

Rincón De Los Montes is a hamlet in the Mexican state of Sinaloa. Its geographical location is 25°15′13″N 107°32′36″W.

Bienvenidos

Rincon De Los Montes is a small town 7.6 miles (12.2 km) from the municipality of Badiraguato. The municipality of Badiraguato reported 759 inhabitants in Rincon De Los Montes.

Rincon de los Montes from a nearby hill
