= Christ of the Sacred Heart =

Statue in El Morro, Baja California, Mexico

Coordinates: 32.2652°N 116.9951°W

- Cristo del Sagrado Corazón
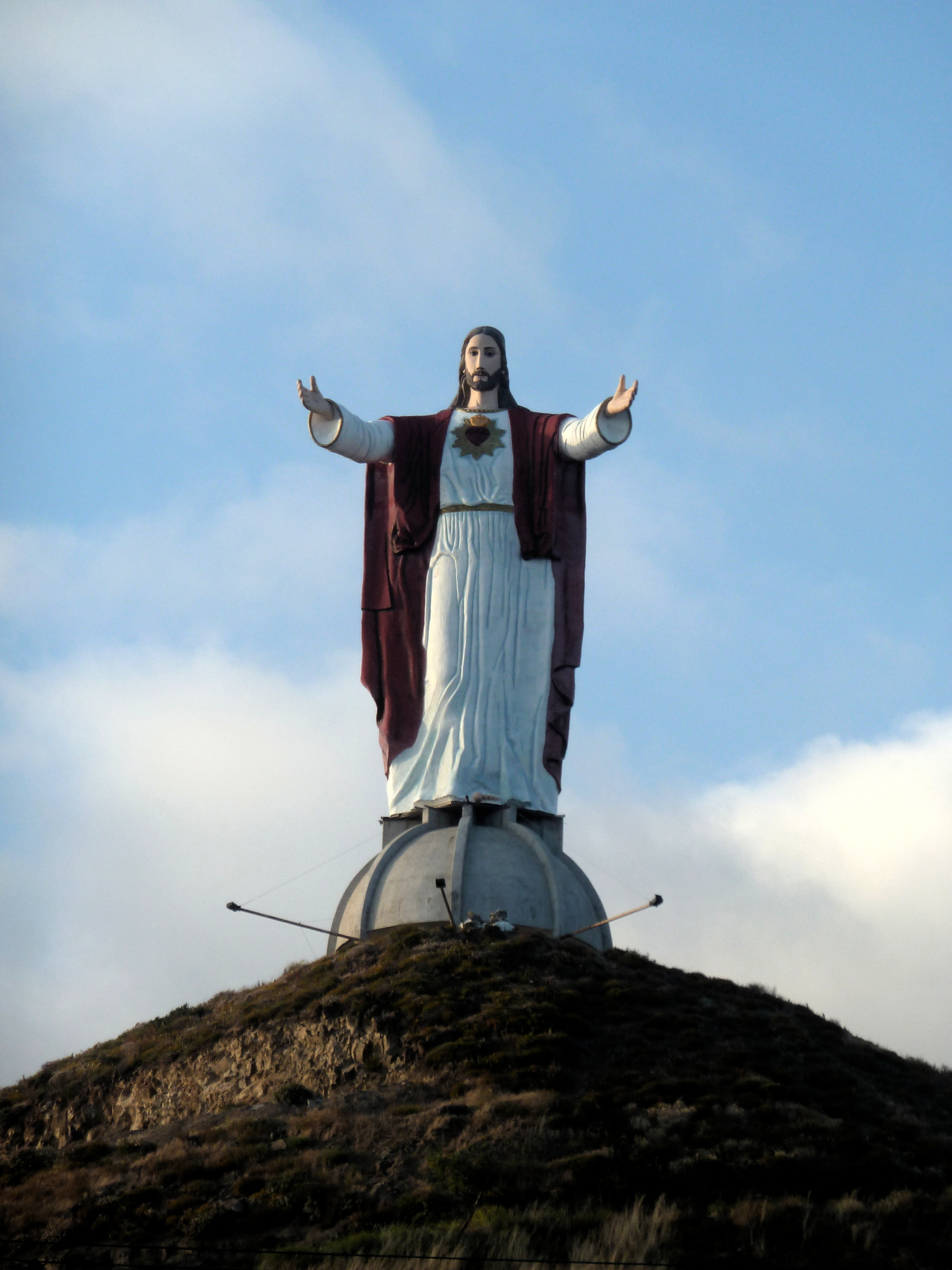
- Interactive map of Christ of the Sacred Heart
- Type: Statue
- Height: 23 metres (75 ft)
- Dedicated to: Jesus

Christ of the Sacred Heart (Spanish: Cristo del Sagrado Corazón) is a 23-metre-tall (75 ft) statue of Jesus displaying his Sacred Heart located above the town of El Morro, 10 kilometres (6.2 mi) south of the city of Rosarito, Baja California, Mexico. The statue is situated directly across the highway from the coastal Las Rocas Resort and Spa, from which an excellent view of the statue can be had.

The statue weighs 40 tons and was commissioned by Antonio Pequeno Guerrero. The head, chest and arms are made of steel and the lower body of fiberglass. The summit on which it sits used to feature a small cross at which locals used to place flowers on holy days.

== See also ==
- List of statues of Jesus
- List of the tallest statues in Mexico
