= Badiraguato Municipality =

Municipality in the Mexican state of Sinaloa

Badiraguato Municipality Municipio de Badiraguato
- Municipality
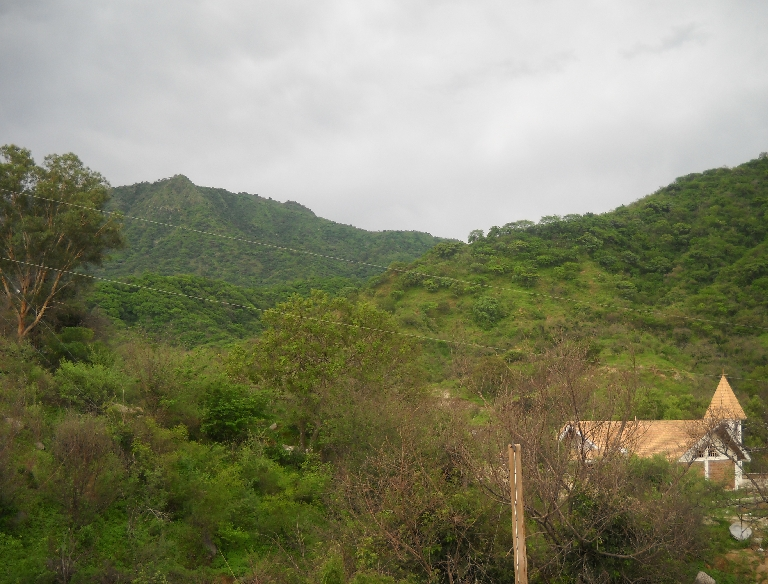
- Huixiopa, Badiraguato

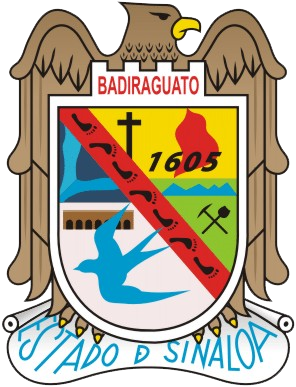
- Coat of arms

- Location of the municipality in Sinaloa
- Coordinates: 25°21′46″N 107°33′05″W
- Country: Mexico
- State: Sinaloa
- Seat: Badiraguato
- No. of Sindicaturas: 15
- Foundation: 1915

Government
  - Municipal president: José Paz López Elenes

Area
  - Total: 5,864.75 km^{2} (2,264.39 sq mi)

Population (2010)
  - Total: 29,999
- Time zone: UTC-7 (Mountain Standard Time)
- Website: Official website

Badiraguato is a municipality in the Mexican state of Sinaloa in northwestern Mexico. The seat of the municipality is in the small town of Badiraguato.

The municipality is in the Sierra Madre Occidental.

== Political subdivision ==
Badiraguato Municipality is subdivided in 15 sindicaturas:

- El Varejonal
- Ciénega de los Lara
- Cortijos de Guaténipa
- Otatillos
- Higueras de Teófilo Álvarez Borboa
- San Nicolás del Sitio
- Santiago de los Caballeros
- San Javier
- San José del Llano
- Huixiopa
- San Luis Gonzaga
- Potrero de Bejarano
- Surutato
- Santa Rita
- Tameapa

=== Villages and hamlets ===
- Rincón de los Montes

== History ==
=== Etymology ===
The origin of the word Badiraguato is composed of the Cáhita-Tarascos terms: ba, "dira"; huato, a hybridism; whose roots are as follows: the Cáhita word ba, "water", "stream or river"; and the Tarascos root dira, "many", and huata or huato, hill; which literally means "stream of many hills", this can be interpreted, in a more concrete way, as "the stream of the mountains".

In pre-Hispanic times, the toponymy was applied to a stream because it accurately refers to the flow of Badiraguato (also known as Río Chico), which springs from the Sierra de Los Parra or Surutato and also gave its name to the town with signs established on its banks where it passes to join in the foothills of the mountain range in front of the disappeared town of Alicama.

The municipality of Badiraguato was created by decree published in the official newspaper of the state on April 8, 1915.

=== Seal ===
The coat of arms of Badiraguato was created by the painter Miguel Ángel Velázquez Tracy. It was declared the official coat of arms in 1978. The overall meaning is as follows: the red band that crosses the shield with footprints symbolizes the passage of the Nahua tribes through the land of Sinaloa.

The spread bronze eagle represents the Mexican homeland that covers and protects the shield of Sinaloa and therefore Badiraguato. The sky in its color represents the horizon expanded by Mexico. The flames are images of the liberating movements that culminated in the legal statutes of 1857 and 1917.

The first quarter in sable symbolizes the darkness of prehistory with the figure of the Badiraguato River as the only witness. The second quarter with a gold background refers to the movement that stirred the spirits of the first discoverers of these lands, who were seeking the precious metal. The purple banner of Castile, pierced with a fallen lance, the cross-shaped tree, and the date 1605 symbolize the true conquest of the Badiraguato Valley.

The third quarter in sinople with figures of hills and a pickaxe and shovel establishes the only source of life during the colonial period for the region: the mines. The last quarter represents the source of work through a semi-baroque brick construction and a flying swallow.

=== Historical Outline ===
The original inhabitants of Badiraguato during the pre-Columbian era was a conglomerate of Tebaca Indians, descendants of the Cáhita. The area saw a transformation of the indigenous culture due first to the invasion of the Tarascans or Purépecha and later to the migrations of the Nahuas.

Badiraguato was a town of belonging to the Tebaca nation, which eventually became part of the province of Culiacan, kingdom of Nueva Galicia in 1621.

During the early 17th century, no conquistador was able to travel to Badiraguato, even though Nuño de Guzmán violently controlled that area around San Miguel de Culiacan which he founded September 29, 1531.

Around the year 1599, Jesuit missionary Hernando de Santarén was entrusted with the evangelization of the Indians of the Acaxee nation, which encompassed the entire region currently occupied by the municipality of Badiraguato. Father Santarén requested help and received it from Father Florian de Ayerve, who ascended the Badiraguato stream in 1605.

The first explorer of the mountains in the region of Badiraguato was Captain Don Cristóbal de Oñate, who, accompanied by Captain Don José de Angulo, reached the plains of Guadiana (Durango) with his conquests, but abandoned the endeavor after five years in 1536.

In the history of the conquest of Badiraguato, twenty years later, Don Francisco de Ibarra, known as "The Phoenix of the Conquerors of Sinaloa," emerged. He came to New Spain under the protection of his uncle, Don Diego de Ibarra, who was a very illustrious knight from Santiago de Guipúzcoa, a wealthy miner, and the founder of Zacatecas.

In the mountains of Badiraguato, several mines were created but didn't produce as much profit as before during the initial conquest in 1531. The indigenous population were bribed although they never received payment. Instead they were forced to work in the mines, but they did receive some compensation on Saint John's Eve.

This miserable situation in which the indigenous people of the Badiraguato region lived fostered hatred for the viceregal government. This led to an armed movement in favor of independence that began on February 25, 1811.

== Notable monument ==
The largest statue of Judas Thaddaeus in the world is in Badiraguato, Sinaloa. It was inaugurated on September 26, 2023.

== Notable people from rancherias in Badiraguato Municipality ==
These individuals were born and lived in rancherias also known as ranchos in Mexican Spanish which are within the Badiraguato Municipality.

- Arturo Beltrán Leyva, Mexican drug kingpin and one of the founders of Beltrán Leyva Cartel (born in Badiraguato)
- Alfredo Beltrán Leyva, Mexican drug kingpin and one of the founders of Beltrán Leyva Cartel (born in Badiraguato)
- Carlos Beltrán Leyva, Mexican drug kingpin and one of the founders of Beltrán Leyva Cartel (born in Badiraguato)
- Héctor Beltrán Leyva, Mexican drug kingpin and one of the founders of Beltrán Leyva Cartel (born in Badiraguato)
- Rafael Caro Quintero, Mexican drug kingpin, one of the founders of Guadalajara Cartel and older brother of Miguel Caro Quintero (founder and leader of Sonora Cartel)
- Ernesto Fonseca Carrillo, Mexican drug kingpin, one of the founders of Guadalajara Cartel and uncle of Amado Carrillo Fuentes a.k.a. "El Señor de los Cielos" ("The Lord of Skies"), founder and former head of Juárez Cartel
- Juan José Esparragoza Moreno, Mexican drug kingpin and one of the founders and leaders of Sinaloa Cartel
- Joaquín "El Chapo" Guzmán, Mexican drug kingpin, and one of the founders and leaders of Sinaloa Cartel
