= Statue of Jude the Apostle, Charles Bridge =

Statue in Prague, Czech Republic

Statue of Jude the Apostle
- Socha svatého Judy Tadeáše (Czech)
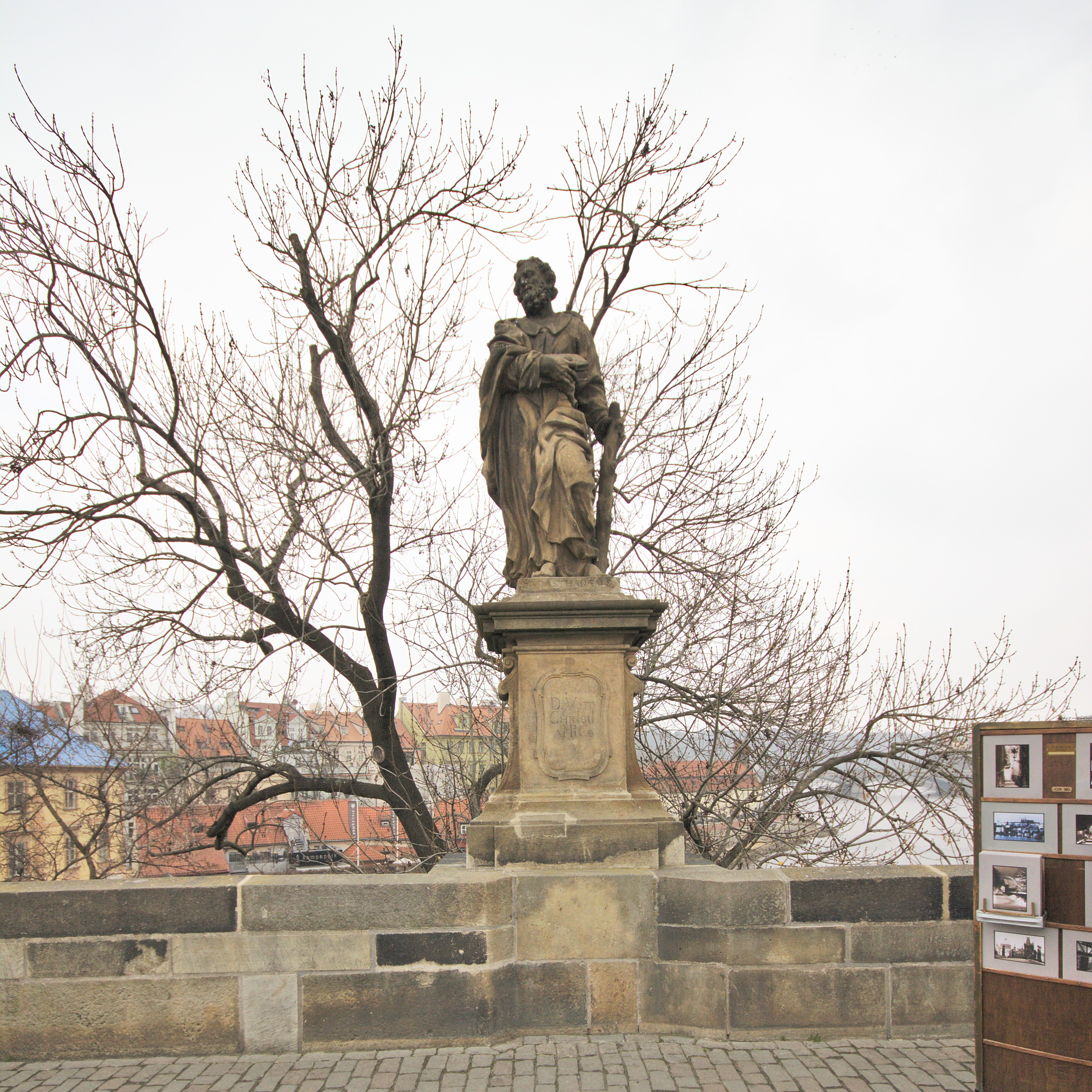
- The statue in 2014
- Artist: Jan Oldřich Mayer
- Type: Sculpture
- Subject: Jude the Apostle
- Location: Prague, Czech Republic; 50°05′12″N 14°24′34″E

The statue of Jude the Apostle (Czech: Socha svatého Judy Tadeáše) is an outdoor sculpture by Jan Oldřich Mayer, installed on the north side of the Charles Bridge in Prague, Czech Republic.
