= Cristo de las Noas =

Sculpture in Torreón, Mexico

Coordinates: 25.5253°N 103.4556°W

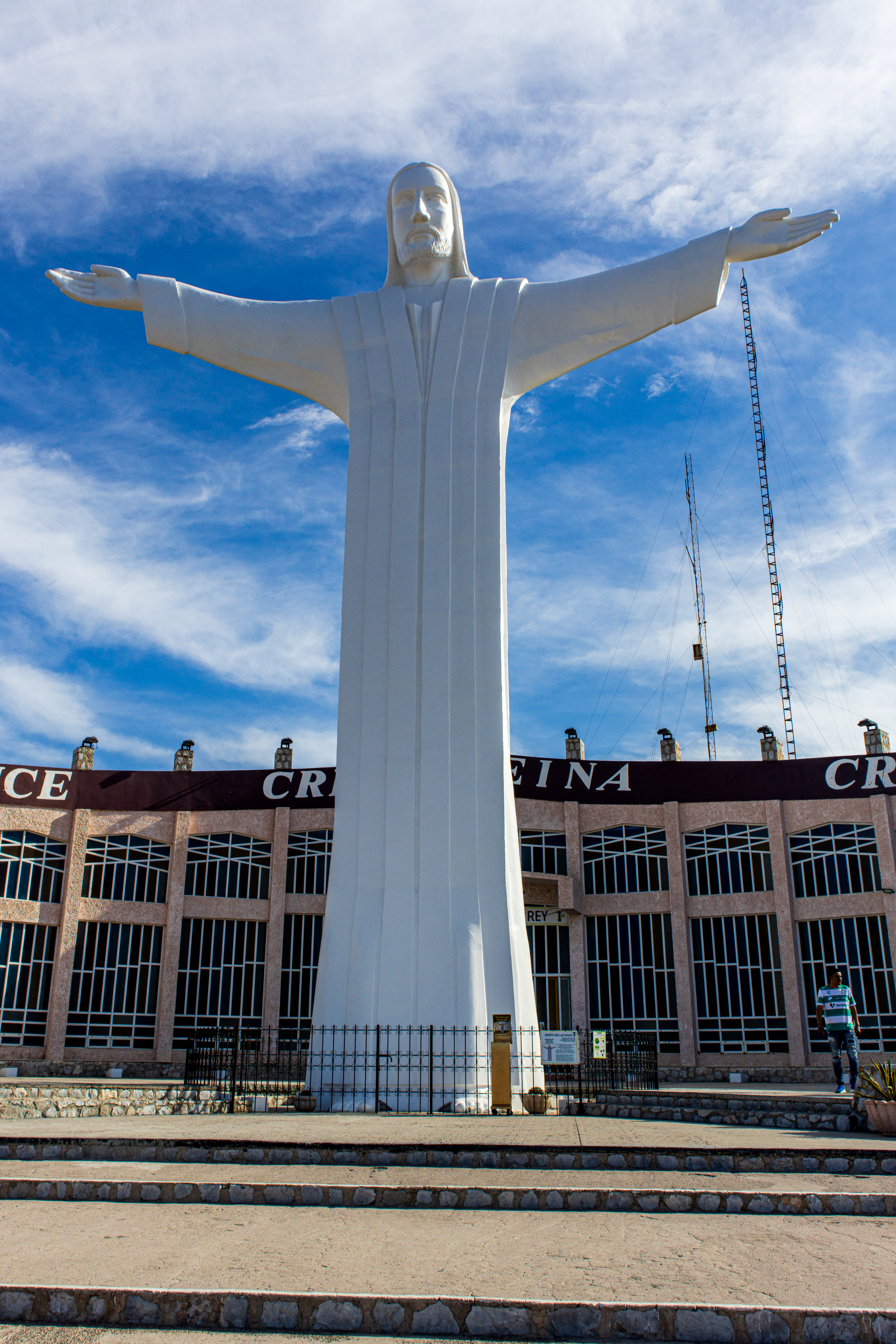
Cristo de las Noas

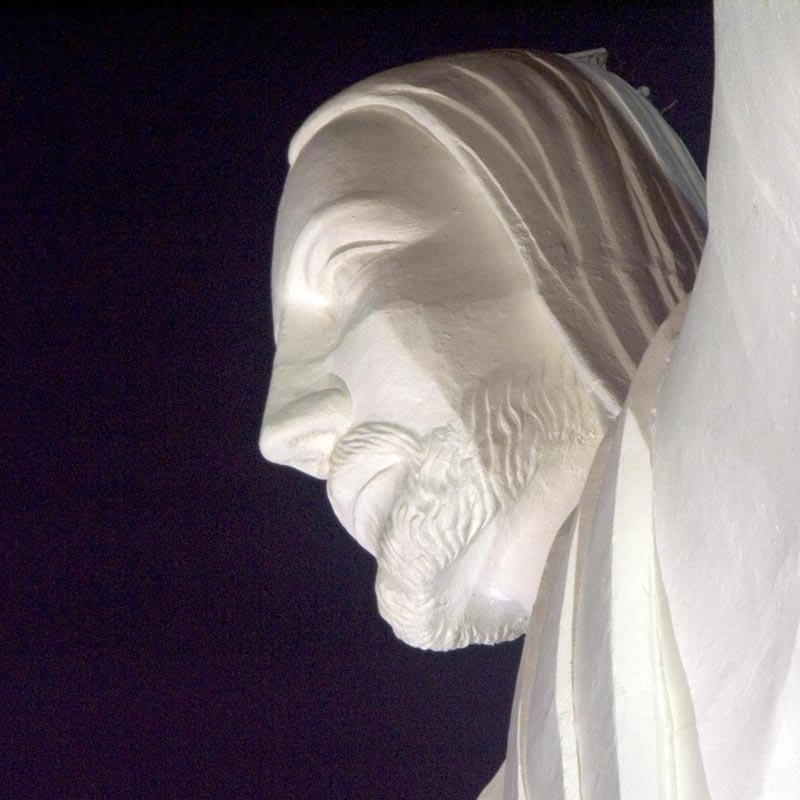
Detail of the head.

El Cristo de las Noas, located on the Cerro de las Noas hill, in the Mexican city of Torreón, Coahuila, is a large sculpture by Vladimir Alvarado, portraying Jesus Christ. It was built between 1973 and 2000.

The statue measures 21.80 meters from its base, and is made of over 580 tons of reinforced concrete; it is the most significant symbol not only of Torreón, but also all of the Comarca Lagunera region. The project was conceived in 1973 by José Rodriguez Tenorio, and is the biggest Christ statue in North America; and third biggest in Latin America, only smaller than the statue of Christ The Redeemer in Rio de Janeiro, Brazil, and Cristo de la Concordia in Cochabamba, Bolivia. In the sanctuary of Christ of the Noas, there is a religious resort with replica of the Holy Land, panoramic restaurant, and soon plans to build a cable car, begun in 1973 and opened in 2000.

This statue owes its name after the hill where it is placed, Cerro de las Noas, named after a desert cactus that grows in this region.

At the Cristo de las Noas Sanctuary, there is a religious touristic complex with Holy Land replicas and a panoramic restaurant.

== See also ==
- List of statues of Jesus
- List of the tallest statues in Mexico
