= Badiraguato =

City in Sinaloa, Mexico

- City
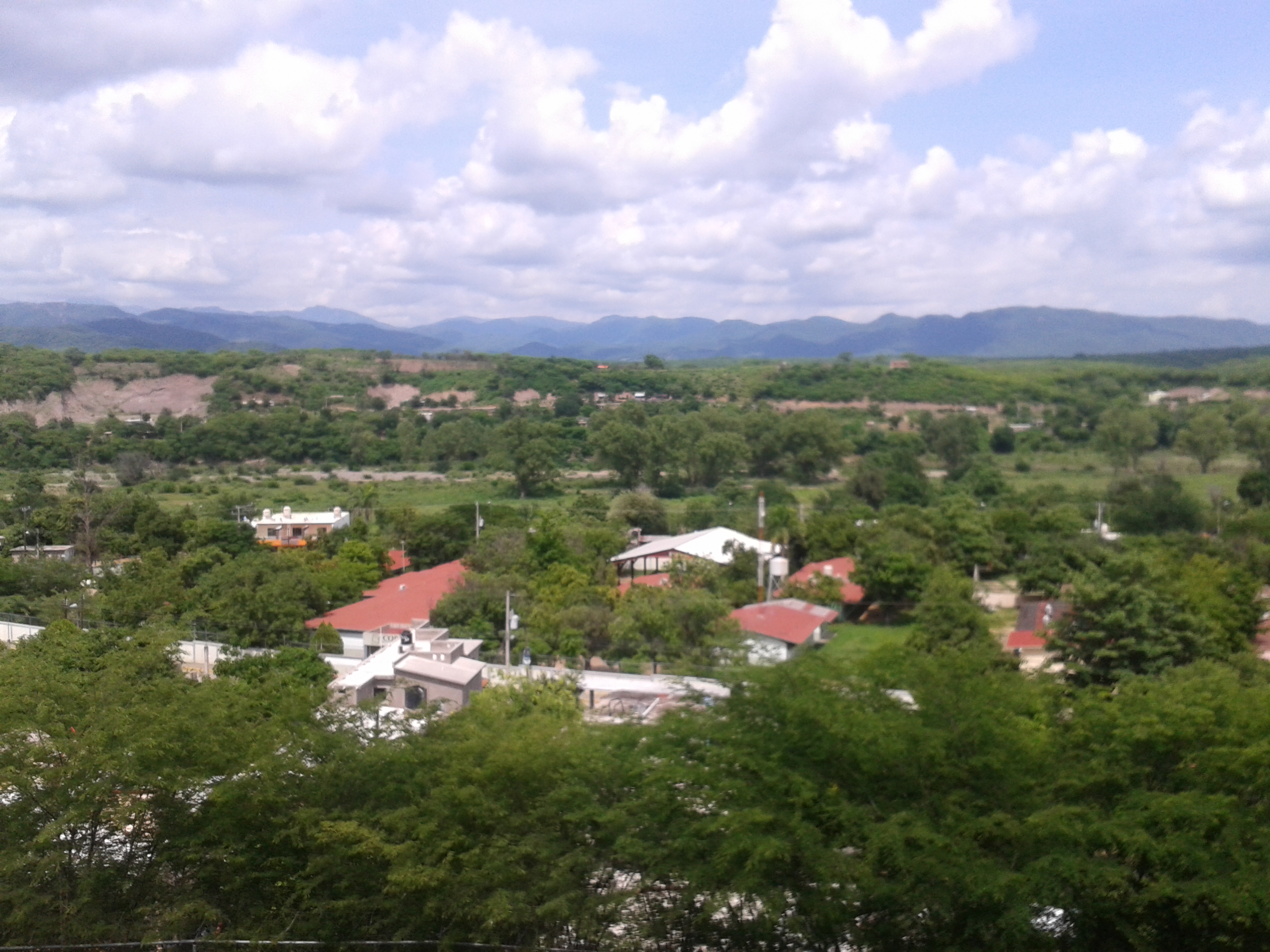
- View of Badiraguato

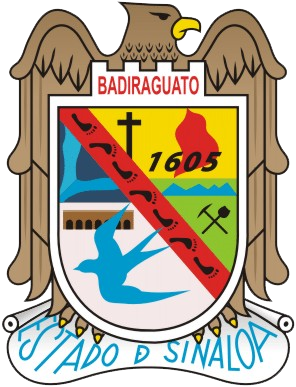
- Seal

- Location in Mexico Badiraguato (Mexico)
- Coordinates: 25°21′47″N 107°33′06″W
- Country: Mexico
- State: Sinaloa
- Municipality: Badiraguato
- Founded in: 1669

Government
  - Municipal president: Diego Salazar

Population (2010)
  - Total: 3,725
- Time zone: UTC-7 (Mountain Standard Time)
- Website: Official website

Badiraguato is a small city and seat of the Badiraguato Municipality in the Mexican state of Sinaloa. It stands at 25°21′47″N 107°33′06″W. According to 2010 census, the city reported 3,725 inhabitants. The hamlet of La Tuna, located 55 kilometres to the North-East of the city, is the birthplace of Joaquín "El Chapo" Guzmán, for a long time one of Mexico's most powerful drug lords.

Badiraguato is located near the municipality of Culiacán. The Sierra Madre Occidental cross Badiragua and provide temperate forest ecosystems in parts of the municipality.

== Etymology ==
The origin of the word Badiraguato is composed of the Cáhita-Purépecha terms: ba, "dira"; huato, a hybridism; whose roots are as follows: the Cáhita word ba, "water", "stream or river"; and the Purépecha root dira, "many", and huata or huato, hill; which literally means "stream of many hills", this can be interpreted, in a more concrete way, as "the stream of the mountains".

In pre-Hispanic times, the toponymy was applied to a stream because it accurately refers to the flow of Badiraguato (also known as Río Chico), which springs from the Sierra de Los Parra or Surutato and also gave its name to the town with signs established on its banks where it passes to join in the foothills of the mountain range in front of the disappeared town of Alicama.

The municipality of Badiraguato was created by decree published in the official newspaper of the state on April 8, 1915.

== History ==
In the seventeenth century, Jesuit missionaries founded San Juan de Badiraguato.

== Recent events ==
President Andrés Manuel López Obrador (AMLO) was widely criticized for meeting Consuela Loera, aged 92 at the time, and mother of convicted drug lord Joaquín "El Chapo" Guzmán, in Badiraguato during the COVID-19 pandemic in Mexico. Loera gave AMLO a letter asking that her son be repatriated to Mexico. Lopez Obrador said,

She is a 92-year-old lady and I already said, the fatal plague is corruption, not an older adult who deserves all my respect, regardless of who her son is. And I would keep doing it. Sometimes I have to shake hands, because that is my job, to white-collar criminals, who have not even lost their respectability. So how can I not give it to a lady?

== Climate ==
Badiraguato has a varied climate, from hot and arid to snowy forests in its higher parts. Areas vary from 44.5 °C, the hottest, to −9 °C degrees, the coldest.

Climate data for Badiraguato (1991–2020 normals, extremes 1961–present)
Month	Jan	Feb	Mar	Apr	May	Jun	Jul	Aug	Sep	Oct	Nov	Dec	Year
Record high °C (°F)	40 (104)	40 (104)	43 (109)	43 (109)	45 (113)	47 (117)	44.5 (112.1)	41 (106)	43 (109)	43 (109)	42 (108)	40.5 (104.9)	47 (117)
Mean daily maximum °C (°F)	29.9 (85.8)	31.2 (88.2)	33.1 (91.6)	35.7 (96.3)	38.1 (100.6)	38.5 (101.3)	35.0 (95.0)	33.9 (93.0)	33.4 (92.1)	34.2 (93.6)	32.6 (90.7)	29.6 (85.3)	33.8 (92.8)
Daily mean °C (°F)	18.7 (65.7)	20.0 (68.0)	21.5 (70.7)	24.0 (75.2)	27.2 (81.0)	30.7 (87.3)	29.3 (84.7)	28.6 (83.5)	28.2 (82.8)	26.5 (79.7)	22.6 (72.7)	19.0 (66.2)	24.7 (76.5)
Mean daily minimum °C (°F)	7.5 (45.5)	8.7 (47.7)	9.8 (49.6)	12.2 (54.0)	16.4 (61.5)	23.0 (73.4)	23.6 (74.5)	23.2 (73.8)	23.0 (73.4)	18.9 (66.0)	12.6 (54.7)	8.4 (47.1)	15.6 (60.1)
Record low °C (°F)	−2 (28)	−5 (23)	1.5 (34.7)	4 (39)	8.5 (47.3)	11 (52)	15 (59)	18 (64)	12 (54)	8 (46)	2 (36)	−3 (27)	−5 (23)
Average precipitation mm (inches)	17.8 (0.70)	12.1 (0.48)	4.6 (0.18)	2.3 (0.09)	1.5 (0.06)	60.7 (2.39)	268.9 (10.59)	242.9 (9.56)	181.6 (7.15)	42.7 (1.68)	26.9 (1.06)	20.5 (0.81)	882.5 (34.74)
Average precipitation days	3.2	3.2	2.2	1.2	0.9	6.5	18.9	18.2	12.8	4.6	3.1	3.3	78.1
Source: Servicio Meteorológico Nacional

== Notable monument ==
The largest statue of Judas Thaddaeus in the world is in Badiraguato, Sinaloa. It was inaugurated on September 26, 2023.

== Notable people from rancherias in Badiraguato Municipality ==
These individuals were born and lived in rancherias also known as ranchos in Mexican Spanish which are within the Badiraguato Municipality.

- El Chapo De Sinaloa, norteño singer
- Arturo Beltrán Leyva, drug kingpin and one of the founders of Beltrán Leyva Cartel
- Alfredo Beltrán Leyva, drug kingpin and one of the founders of Beltrán Leyva Cartel
- Carlos Beltrán Leyva, drug kingpin and one of the founders of Beltrán Leyva Cartel
- Héctor Beltrán Leyva, drug kingpin and one of the founders of Beltrán Leyva Cartel
- Rafael Caro Quintero, drug kingpin and co-founder of the Guadalajara Cartel
- Juan José Esparragoza Moreno, drug kingpin and co-founder of the Guadalajara Cartel
- Joaquín "El Chapo" Guzmán, drug kingpin and former leader of the Sinaloa Cartel
