= List of tallest crosses in the world =

This list of tallest crosses in the world includes all crosses with a minimum height of 30 metres (98 feet).

== List ==
Name	Country	Town	Coordinates	Height m (ft)	Year of completion	Picture	Remarks
Cruz de los Caídos	Spain	San Lorenzo de El Escorial	40.641800 -4.155596	150 m (490 ft)	1958		
Dambana ng Kagitingan Memorial Cross	Philippines	Pilar, Bataan	14.6058464 120.5087274	95 m (312 ft)	1970		observation deck in crossarm
Cruz del Tercer Milenio (Third Millennium Cross)	Chile	Coquimbo	-29.952048 -71.347530	92 m (302 ft)	2001		observation deck in crossarm
Cruz do santuário São Miguel Arcanjo (Cross of Sanctuary of San Miguel Archangel)	Brazil	Bandeirantes	-23.132055 -50.401194	81 m (266 ft)	2017		
Radio Relay Tower of Radio Vatican Transmission Center	Italy	Santa Maria di Galeria	42.0441298778 12.3222774267	78 m (256 ft)	1957		Cross-shaped radio tower
Cross of All Nations	Lebanon	Qanat Bakish	33.9652146 35.8138418	73.8 m (242 ft)	2010		
Cross of All People	Brazil	Divinópolis	-20.127070 -44.954762	73.8 m (242 ft)			
Montemorelos Cross	Mexico	Montemorelos	25.243883 -99.860889	73 m (240 ft)	2021		
Branson Cross	United States	Branson, Missouri	36.7519° N, 93.2249° W	66.4464 m (218.000 ft)	2018		White cross with tears
Skopje Millennium Cross	North Macedonia	Skopje	41.964994 21.394372	66 m (217 ft)	2011		
Bell Tower of Lakeuden Risti Church	Finland	Seinäjoki	62.787045 22.845565	65.2 m (214 ft)	1960		bell tower of a Lutheran church with the shape of a double cross
Orthodox Cross Dračevo	North Macedonia	Dračevo	41.93806, 21.51839	63.5 m (208 ft)	2024		
Great Cross	United States	St. Augustine, Florida	29.9042789 -81.3135266	63.4 m (208 ft)	1966		
El Glorioso Cristo de Chiapas	Mexico	Copoya, Municipio de Tuxtla Gutiérrez, Chiapas	16.7176 -93.121	62 m (203 ft)	2011		
Cross of Ridge Assembly of God	United States	Davenport, Florida	28.195976 -81.637552	60.96 m (200.0 ft)			
Haughton Cross	United States	Haughton, Louisiana	32.554724 -93.622539	60.65 m (199.0 ft)	2009		
Cross at First Baptist Church of Central Florida	United States	Orlando, Florida	28.548272 -81.506951	60.65 m (199.0 ft)	2008		
The Cross at the Crossroads	United States	Effingham, Illinois	39.107602 -88.571203	60.35 m (198.0 ft)	2001		
Cross of Hope	Lebanon	Ijdabra	34.2491731 35.7010201	60 m (200 ft)			High-rise building in shape of a double cross with a church in one arm
Cross of Our Lord Jesus Christ	United States	Groom, Texas	35.2098038 -101.1234949	57.91 m (190.0 ft)	1955		
Skopje Aerodrom Cross	North Macedonia	Skopje	41.977664 21.464592	56.5 m (185 ft)	2014		
Cruz Monumental de El Arenal	Mexico	El Arenal	20.221519 -98.912044	55 m (180 ft)	2014		
Central cross at Cross Church Pinnacle Hills	United States	Rogers, Arkansas	36.314620 -94.188198	53.34 m (175.0 ft)			ensemble of three crosses
Basílica de la Virgen del Camino Cross	Spain	León	42.580173 -5.641638	53 m (174 ft)	1961		
Meskel Cross	Ethiopia	Mekelle, Tigray	13.495427 39.488144	52 m (171 ft)	2017		
Sagemont Church Cross	United States	Houston, Texas	29.5996555 -95.2198899	51.82 m (170.0 ft)	2009		
Aruvithura Cross	India	Kottayam, Kerala	9.682450, 76.767361	50.9 m (167 ft)	2014		
Central cross at Cross Church Pinnacle Hills	United States	Rogers, Arkansas	36.314544 -94.188260	50.29 m (165.0 ft)			ensemble of three crosses
Cross of Sanctuary of Our Lady of Lourdes and Praise	Brazil	Ituporanga	-27.415453 -49.611125	50 m (160 ft)			observation tower
Artsakh Cross	Azerbaijan (formerly NKR)	Dashushen	39.805404 46.786311	50 m (160 ft)	2017		Demolished by Azerbaijani Armed Forces
Edmond Cross	United States	Edmond, Oklahoma	35.6497844 -97.4224877	49.7 m (163 ft)	1996		
Third Millennium Cross	Poland	Ropczyce	50.0156403 21.57605007	47 m (154 ft)	2006		observation deck on the structure
Drokino Hill Cross	Russia	Krasnoyarsk	56.082184 92.780719	47 m (154 ft)	2019		
Large Cross at Bellevue Baptist Church	United States	Cordova, Tennessee	35.183421 -89.811886	45.72 m (150.0 ft)	1999		
Large cross of Bethany World Prayer Center	United States	Baton Rouge, Louisiana	30.380179 -91.059992	45.72 m (150.0 ft)			
Large cross of Restoration Fellowship Church	United States	Strasburg, Virginia	39.017533 -78.358250	45.72 m (150.0 ft)			
Cruz de Chorrillos	Peru	Lima	-12.168007 -77.035343	45 m (148 ft)	1988		
Chełmiec Millennium Cross	Poland	Boguszów-Gorce	50.780112 16.211561	45 m (148 ft)	2000		
Charles-de-Gaulle Memorial	France	Colombey-les-Deux-Églises	48.224394 4.879641	44.3 m (145 ft)	1972		
Central cross at Cross Church Pinnacle Hills	United States	Rogers, Arkansas	36.314640 -94.188325	44.2 m (145 ft)			ensemble of three crosses
Gora Qabaristan Cross	Pakistan	Karachi	24.8561 67.0498	42.7 m (140 ft)	2015		
La Cruz de La Capilla Ecuménica de La Paz	Mexico	Acapulco, Guerrero	16.822722 -99.855992	42 m (138 ft)	1970		
Monument to the Fallen Shipyard Workers of 1970	Poland	Gdansk	54.3605263 18.6490351	42 m (138 ft)	1980		3 crosses
Muntenii de Sus Cross	Romania	Muntenii de Sus	46.666307 27.789976	42 m (138 ft)	2017		
Centennial Cross	United States	Dubuque	42.445 90.695	42 m (137 ft)	2024		Originally built in 1937 to a height of 23 m (75 ft)
Cristo de la Bartola	Mexico	Monclova	26.916185, -101.436381	41.5 m (136 ft)			
Góra Liwocz Sanktuarium	Poland	Brzyska	49.813284 21.351323	41 m (135 ft)			Chapel with 18 m (59 ft) high cross on the tower, also used for radio transmission
Pilgerkreuz Veitsch	Austria	Veitsch	47.5832817 15.4908493	40.70 m (133.5 ft)	2004		observation deck in crossarm
Danube Park Papal Cross	Austria	Vienna	48.2392518 16.4087248	40 m (130 ft)	1983		
Cross of Sanctuary of Saint Pio of Pietrelcina	Italy	San Giovanni Rotondo	41.706515 15.704057	40 m (130 ft)	2004		
Păun Trinitas Cross	Romania	Păun	47.1004938473 27.6655912399	40 m (130 ft)	2006		broadcasting tower
Trzy Lipki Cross	Poland	Bielsko-Biała	49.834716 19.017404	40 m (130 ft)	2001		
Ujazd Millennium Cross	Poland	Ujazd	49.8025499 21.40171855688	40 m (130 ft)	2002		
Kobayat Cross	Lebanon	Kobayat	34.559023781 36.2768206	40 m (130 ft)	2013		
Hero's Cross	Romania	Caraiman Creek	45.416012 25.497492	39.3 m (129 ft)	1928		
Cross of Chillán Cathedral	Chile	Chillán	-36.6065409415 -72.102150321	39 m (128 ft)	1950		
Gardendale Baptist Church Cross	United States	Gardendale, Alabama	33.664572 -86.830581	38.1 m (125 ft)	2010		
Large cross of Chattanooga Crossing Church	United States	Chattanooga, Tennessee	35.053366 -85.139569	38.1 m (125 ft)			
River of Praise Church Cross	United States	Tomball, Texas	30.053824 -95.622324	38.1 m (125 ft)	2017		
Joseph Cross	Germany	Stolberg	51.580574 11.005624	38 m (125 ft)	1896		double cross, observation deck on the top
Cruz del Ávila	Venezuela	Caracas	10.5250544 -66.8852380	37 m (121 ft)	1982		
Krosno Pope Cross	Poland	Krosno	49.678390 21.771501	37 m (121 ft)	1997		
Limanowski Cross	Poland	Limanowa	49.718916 20.440613	37 m (121 ft)	1999		
Cruz de Calvillo	Mexico	Calvillo	21.841692 -102.727672	37 m (121 ft)	2020		
Central cross of Bethany World Prayer Center	United States	Baton Rouge, Louisiana	30.380330 -91.060117; 30.380178 -91.059780	36.58 m (120.0 ft)			3 crosses
Central cross of Restoration Fellowship Church	United States	Strasburg, Virginia	39.017645 -78.358180; 39.017423 -78.358314	36.58 m (120.0 ft)			3 crosses
Batesville Cross	United States	Batesville, Mississippi	34.303105 -89.919268	36.58 m (120.0 ft)	2017		
Cross at Moffley Hill	Canada	Sault Ste. Marie, Ontario	46.522022 -84.330977	36.57 m (120.0 ft)	1960		
Small crosses at Bellevue Baptist Church	United States	Cordova, Tennessee	35.183524 -89.811962; 35.183312 -89.811808	36.57 m (120.0 ft)	1999		2 crosses
Cross of Family Worship Center	United States	Cairo, Georgia	35.2098038 -101.1234949	36.57 m (120.0 ft)	2022		
Papstwarte	Austria	Horn	48.699104 15.679800	36.5 m (120 ft)	1983		
Dublin Papal Cross	Ireland	Dublin	53.356648829 -6.32906546	35.36 m (116.0 ft)	1979		
Hrobacza Łąka Cross	Poland	Bielsko-Biała	49.822710268 19.16505664587	35 m (115 ft)	2002		
Romanian People's Salvation Cross	Moldova	Nisporeni	47.069618 28.200751	35 m (115 ft)	2011		
Fátima Cruz Alta	Portugal	Fátima	39.629370 -8.674670	34 m (112 ft)	2007		
Zabrze Pope Cross	Poland	Zabrze	50.324255 18.775747	34.6 m (114 ft)	1999		
Watchman Cross	United States	Ponce, Puerto Rico	18.019242 -66.6199994	34 m (112 ft)	1984		
Bald Knob Cross	United States	Alto Pass, Illinois	37.55195224 -89.346379190	33.83 m (111.0 ft)	1963		
Catfish House Giant Cross	United States	Florence, Missouri	32.160798 -90.127203	33.53 m (110.0 ft)	2015		
Lake City Cross	United States	Lake City, South Carolina	33.889095 -79.755529	33.53 m (110.0 ft)	2016		
Cookeville Cross	United States	Cookeville, Tennessee	36.135426, -85.517036	33.53 m (110.0 ft)			
Pigeon Forge Cross	United States	Pigeon Forge, Tennessee	35.802208, -83.581121	33.53 m (110.0 ft)			
Wichita Immanuel Baptist Church Cross	United States	Wichita, Kansas	37.668336 -97.334507	33.53 m (110.0 ft)			
Błonia Pope Cross	Poland	Siedlce	52.184247 22.290173	33 m (108 ft)	1999		
Góra Jana Cross	Poland	Pelplin	53.928939 18.669835	33 m (108 ft)	1999		
Prespa Cross	North Macedonia	Podmocani	41.029704 21.055144	33 m (108 ft)	2000		
Hum Hill Millennium Cross	Bosnia and Herzegovina	Mostar	43.329521 17.806944	33 m (108 ft)	2002		
Przełęcz Rędzińska Jubilee Cross	Poland	Rędziny	50.831285 15.938523	33 m (108 ft)	2000		
Kruševo Cross	North Macedonia	Kruševo	41.402431 21.223285	33 m (108 ft)	2010		
Pacification of Wujek	Poland	Katowice	50.243876 18.989635	33 m (108 ft)	2000		
Artashavan Holy Cross	Armenia	Artashavan	40.413655 44.380233	33 m (108 ft)			
St. John Paul II Parish Chapel	Lithuania	Šilainiai, Kaunas	54.925565 23.87231	33 m (108 ft)	2019		Tallest cross in Lithuania
Cross at Hilltop Baptist Church	United States	Indiana, Pa	40.58633792, -79.21230442	32.9184 m (108.000 ft)			
Wilcy Las Millennium Cross	Poland	Wilcy Las	51.268507 15.755585	32 m (105 ft)	2000		
Starej Wsi Millennium Cross	Poland	Stara Wies	49.907724189 19.122878129	31.5 m (103 ft)	2000		
Mount Davidson Cross	United States	San Francisco, California	37.738353 -122.454783	31.39 m (103.0 ft)	1934		
Mount Royal Cross	Canada	Montreal	45.508860 -73.587936	31.4 m (103 ft)	1924		
Piatra Fântânele Cross	Romania	Bistriţa	47.2397217 25.0110519	31 m (102 ft)			
Caryville Cross	United States	Caryville, Tennessee	36.374491 -84.240211	30.94 m (101.5 ft)	2003		
Hunter's Chapel Holy Church Cross	United States	Lasper, Alabama	33.791356 -87.227456	30.48 m (100.0 ft)			
Inspiration Network City of Lights Campus Cross	United States	Charlotte, North Carolina	34.966975 -80.847750	30.48 m (100.0 ft)			
Ballinger Cross	United States	Ballinger, Texas	31.7237343574 -99.9322441	30.48 m (100.0 ft)	1993		
Calvary Church Cross	United States	Springfield, Illinois	39.744032, -89.660028	30.48 m (100.0 ft)	2015		
Cross of New Providence Baptist Church	United States	Loudon, Tennessee	35.778367, -84.350973	30.48 m (100.0 ft)	2002		
Pro-Life Millennium Cross	Canada	Aberdeen, Saskatchewan	52.38949015 -106.1579528	30.48 m (100.0 ft)	2005		
Small crosses of Chattanooga Crossing Church	United States	Chattanooga, Tennessee	35.053317 -85.139527; 35.053409 -85.139600	30.48 m (100.0 ft)			3 crosses
Hammond Mission Church Cross	United States	Hammond, Louisiana	30.459164 -90.475883	30.48 m (100.0 ft)			
Cruz Cerro Philippi	Chile	Puerto Varas	-41.310105 -72.980091	30 m (98 ft)	1980		
Perchiu Hill Hero Cross	Romania	Onesti	46.263458 26.753715	30 m (98 ft)	1999		broadcasting tower
Cruz de Morro da Cruz	Brazil	Igrejinha	-29.539768 -50.836954	30 m (98 ft)			
Golgota Beskidów Cross	Poland	Radziechowy	49.6389923 19.117970	30 m (98 ft)	2001		
Brusznia Cross	Poland	Kielce	50.865336 20.563670	30 m (98 ft)	2007		
Iwierzyce Millennium Cross	Poland	Iwierzyce	50.038784 21.720707	30 m (98 ft)			
Svartberget Cross	Sweden	Hassela	62.086474 16.723348	30 m (98 ft)	2011		
Cruz Celestial de Xicotepec	Mexico	Xicotepec	20.289408 -97.948616	30 m (98 ft)	2018		

== See also ==
- Wayside cross
- Lithuanian cross crafting
- Khachkar
- Cross of Sacrifice
