= Jude the Apostle =

Apostle of Jesus

Saint Jude the Apostle
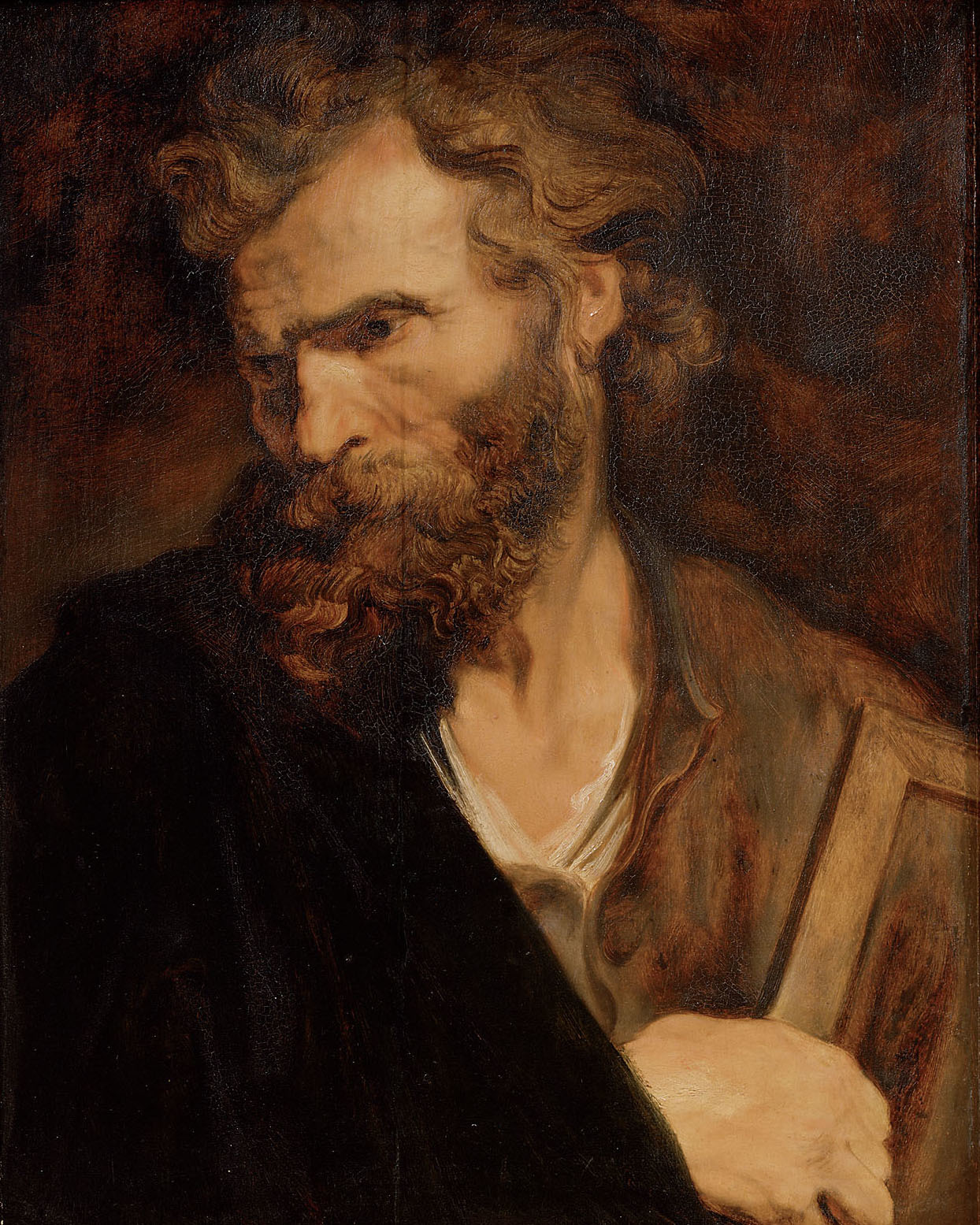
- The Apostle Judas Thaddeus by Anthony van Dyck

Apostle and Martyr
- Born: c. 12 BC; Galilee
- Died: c. 65 AD
- Venerated in: All Christian denominations that venerate saints
- Canonized: Pre-Congregation
- Major shrine: Monastery of Saint Thaddeus, West Azerbaijan province, Iran; St. Peter's Basilica, Rome; Reims, Toulouse, France
- Feast: 28 October (Western Christianity); 19 June and 30 June, (Eastern Christianity)
- Attributes: Axe, club, canon, medallion
- Patronage: Armenia; lost causes; desperate situations; hospitals; St. Petersburg, Florida; Cotta; the Chicago Police Department; CR Flamengo (in Rio de Janeiro, Brazil); places in the Philippines (Lucena in Quezon, Sibalom in Antique, and Trece Martires in Cavite); and Sinajana, Guam

Jude the Apostle (Koine Greek: Ἰούδας Ἰακώβου, romanized: Ioúdas Iakóbou) was one of the Apostles in the New Testament. He is generally identified as Thaddeus (Θαδδαῖος; Old Armenian: Թադէոս; Coptic: ⲑⲁⲇⲇⲉⲟⲥ) and is also variously called Judas Thaddaeus, Jude Thaddaeus, Judas son of James, Judas of James, Jude of James, or Lebbaeus. He is sometimes identified with Jude, the brother of Jesus, but is clearly distinguished from Judas Iscariot, the disciple who betrayed Jesus prior to his crucifixion. Catholic writer Michal Hunt suggests that Judas Thaddaeus became known as Jude after early translators of the New Testament from Greek into English sought to distinguish him from Judas Iscariot and subsequently abbreviated his forename. Most versions of the New Testament in languages other than English and French refer to Judas and Jude by the same name.

The Armenian Apostolic Church honors Thaddeus along with Saint Bartholomew as its patron saints. In the Catholic Church, he is the patron saint of desperate cases and lost causes.

Jude Thaddeus is commonly depicted with a club. He is also often shown in icons with a flame around his head. This represents his presence at Pentecost, when he received the Holy Spirit with the other apostles. Another common attribute is Jude holding an image of Jesus, known as the Image of Edessa. In some instances, he may be shown with a scroll or a book (the Epistle of Jude) or holding a carpenter's rule.

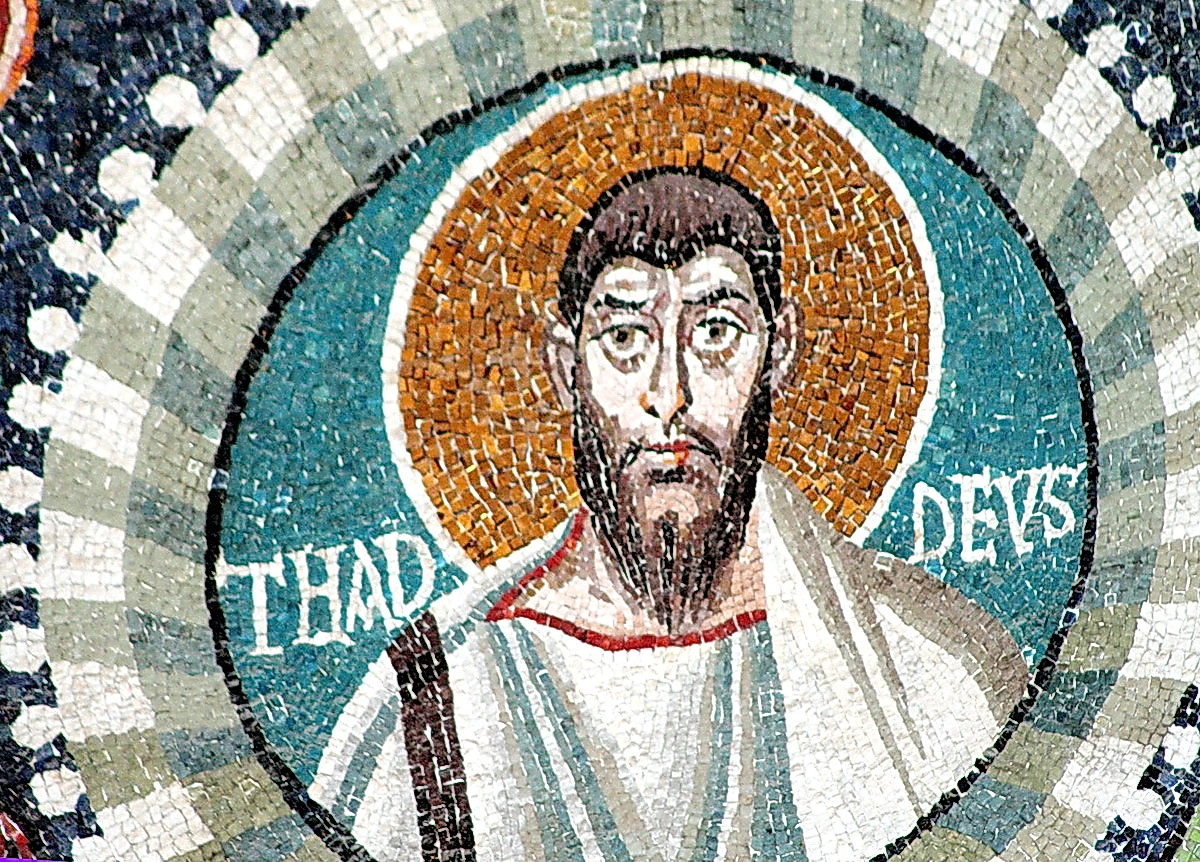
Jude the Apostle, detail of the mosaic in the Basilica of San Vitale, Ravenna, 6th century

== Identity ==
=== New Testament ===
Jude is clearly distinguished from Judas Iscariot, another apostle and later the betrayer of Jesus. Both Jude and Judas are translations of the name Ὶούδας in the New Testament, which in turn is a Greek variant of Judah, a Hebrew language name which was common among Jews at the time. In most Bibles in languages other than English and French, Jude and Judas are referred to by the same name.

Aside from Judas Iscariot, the New Testament mentions Jude or Judas six times, in four different contexts:

1. "Judas (or Jude) of James", explicitly listed as one of the twelve apostles (Luke 6:16 and Acts 1:13);
2. "Judas, (not Judas Iscariot)", apparently an apostle (as he was present at the Last Supper) (John 14:22);
3. the brother of Jesus (Matthew 13:55, Mark 6:3);
4. the writer of the Epistle of Jude, who identifies himself as "the brother of James" (Jude 1).

Protestants generally believe 1 and 2 to be one person, although theologian Raymond Brown saw the identification as uncertain.

=== Brother of James or son of James ===
Translations into English from the original Greek of the New Testament vary in their rendering of Luke 6:16 and Acts 1:13. A literal translation of the references to Jude in these passages gives "Judas of James" (Ancient Greek: Ἰούδας Ἰακώβου, romanized: Ioudas Iakōbou), as in Young's Literal Translation of the Bible, but scholars differ on whether this means "Jude/Judas, brother of James" or "Jude/Judas, son of James". The King James version calls him "Judas the brother of James" and the Douay-Rheims version calls him "Jude the brother of James", making him the same person as the writer of the Epistle of Jude, who identifies himself as "Jude, the servant of Jesus Christ, and brother of James" (Jude 1:1).

Most modern translations (including the New International Version, Revised Standard Version and New Revised Standard Version), identify him as "Judas the son of James", and not the same person as the author of the Epistle of Jude. Protestant scholar Darrell L. Bock writes that it must mean "son" not "brother", because when "brother" is intended, the Greek word for 'brother' (adelphos) is present. Bock also says that means he was not the brother of Jesus. Additionally the use of the genitive case of "James" (Iakovou) in Greek, usually signifies or implies the person's father to be distinguished from his homonyms.

Opinion is divided on whether Jude/Judas the apostle was also Jude, brother of Jesus, the traditional author of the Epistle of Jude. Generally, Catholics believe the two Judes are the same person.

According to the surviving fragments of the work Exposition of the Sayings of the Lord of the Apostolic Father Papias of Hierapolis, who lived c. 60–130 AD, Mary the wife of Cleophas or Alphaeus would be the mother of Judas the brother of Jesus that Papias identifies with Thaddeus:

Mary the wife of Cleophas or Alphaeus, who was the mother of James the bishop and apostle, and of Simon and Thaddeus, and of one Joseph...

— Fragment X

However, the above fragment is properly attributed by J.B. Lightfoot to a different Papias, an 11th century Latin lexicographer. The quotation is found in this Papias' Elementarium Doctrinae Rudimentum.

=== Possible identity with Thaddeus ===
St. Thaddeus, St. Sandukht and other Christians in Sanatruk's prison

In the apostolic lists at Matthew 10:3 and Mark 3:18, Jude is omitted, but there is a Thaddeus (or in some manuscripts of Matthew 10:3, "Lebbaeus who was surnamed Thaddaeus", as in the King James Version) listed in his place. This has led many Christians since early times to harmonize the lists by positing a "Jude Thaddeus", known by either name. This is made plausible by the fact that a number of New Testament figures have multiple names (such as Simon Peter and Joseph Barnabas). It has been argued that the name "Judas" was tarnished by Judas Iscariot and for this reason Mark and Matthew referred to him by an alternative name.

Some Biblical scholars reject this theory, however. They have proposed alternative theories to explain the discrepancy: an unrecorded replacement of one for the other during the ministry of Jesus because of apostasy or death; the possibility that "twelve" was a symbolic number and an estimation; or simply that the names were not recorded perfectly by the early church.

Thaddeus, one of the twelve apostles, is often indistinguishable from Thaddeus of Edessa, whom Eastern Christianity considers as one of the Seventy disciples.

In some Latin manuscripts of Matthew 10:3, Thaddeus is called Judas the Zealot.

=== In other manuscripts ===
According to the Golden Legend, which is a collection of hagiographies compiled by Jacobus de Voragine in the thirteenth century:

This Judas was called by many names. He was said Judas of James, for he was brother to James the Less, and he was called Thaddeus, which is as much to say as taking a prince; or Thadee is said of Thadea, that is a vesture, and of Deus, that is God, for he was vesture royal of God by ornament of virtues, by which he took Christ the prince. He is said also in the History Ecclesiastic, Lebbæus, which is as much to say as heart, or worshipper of heart. Or he is said Lebbæus of lebes, that is a vessel of heart by great hardiness, or a worshipper of heart by purity, a vessel by plenitude of grace, for he deserved to be a vessel of virtues and a caldron of grace.

In the same work, Simon Cananean and Judas Thaddeus are described as siblings of James the Less and sons of Mary of Clopas, who was married to Alpheus.

The Epistle of Saint Jude was traditionally attributed to the Apostle Jude, and is a short piece. Some statues of Saint Jude include the letter (such as the statue of Saint Jude by Adam Kossowski in Faversham, Kent).

== Tradition and legend ==
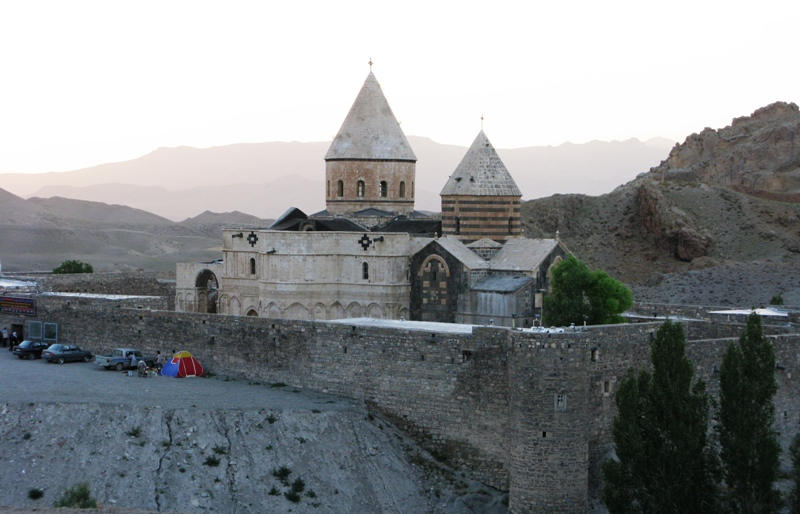
Monastery of Saint Thaddeus, West Azerbaijan province, Iran

Tradition holds that Jude preached the Gospel in Judea, Samaria, Idumaea, Syria, Mesopotamia and Libya. He is also said to have visited Beirut and Edessa, though the emissary of the latter mission is also identified as Addai of Edessa, one of the seventy disciples. The 14th-century writer Nikephoros Kallistos Xanthopoulos makes Jude the bridegroom at the wedding at Cana. The legend reports that Jude was born into a Jewish family in Paneas, a town in the Galilee later rebuilt during the Roman period and renamed Caesarea Philippi. (Note: However, Philostorgius, the 5th-century Arian Christian historian, says in his Historia Ecclesiastica: "The district of Paneas was formerly called Dan. But in the course of time it came to be called Caesarea Philippi, and later still, when the heathen erected in it a statue of the God Pan, its name was changed to Paneas.")

In all probability, he spoke both Greek and Aramaic, like almost all of his contemporaries in that area, and was a farmer by trade. According to the legend, Jude was the son of Clopas and Mary of Clopas, sister of Mary, mother of Jesus.

Although Gregory the Illuminator is credited as the "Apostle to the Armenians", when he baptized King Tiridates III of Armenia in 301, converting the Armenians, the Apostles Jude and Bartholomew are traditionally believed to have been the first to bring Christianity to Armenia, and are therefore venerated as the patron saints of the Armenian Apostolic Church. Linked to this tradition is the Monastery of Saint Thaddeus (now in northern Iran) and Saint Bartholomew Monastery (now in southeastern Turkey), which were both constructed in what was then Armenia.

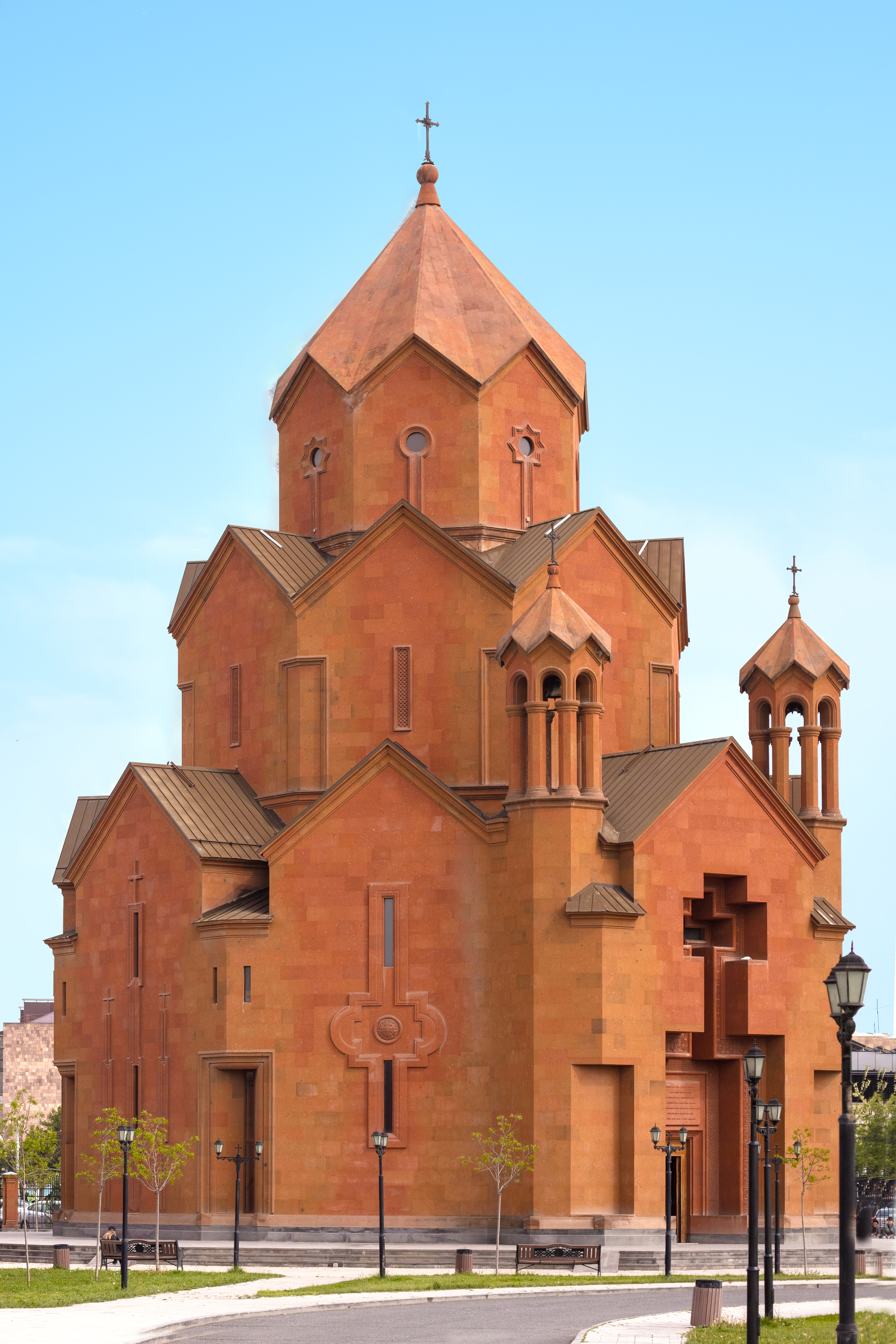
Saint Thaddeus Church, Masis

On October 4, 2015, Garegin II, the Catholicos of All Armenians, consecrated Saint Thaddeus Church, Masis, Armenia. The construction site of the church was chosen by Vazgen I, the Catholicos of All Armenians, in 1991, and the ground-blessing service was held that same year.

== Death and remains ==
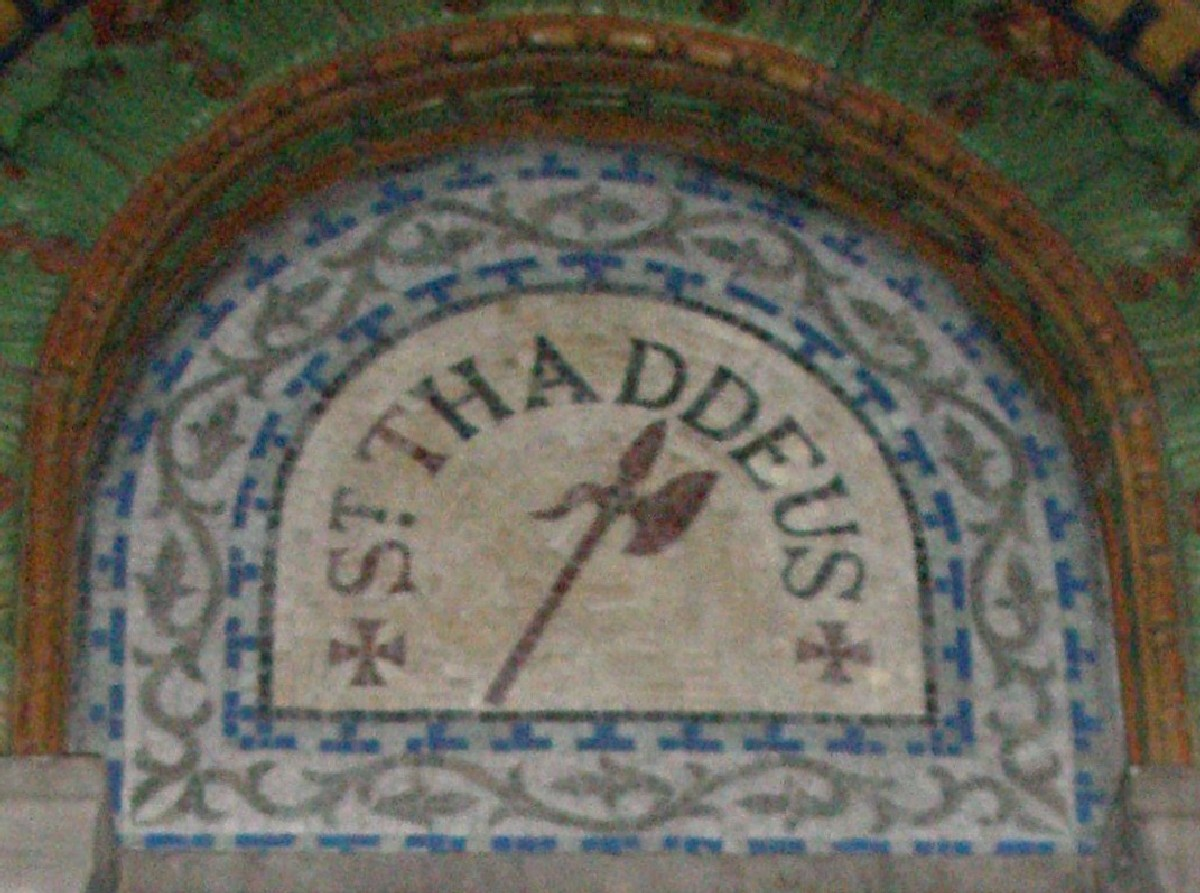
Symbol of his martyrdom

According to the hagiographic tradition of the Armenian Apostolic Church, Thaddeus suffered martyrdom in AD 66 in Armenia by the order of Armenia's King Sanatruk, along with Bartholomew the Apostle and Saint Santoukhd. According to this tradition, his tomb is located at the Monastery of Saint Thaddeus in Qareh Kelisa, West Azerbaijan Province, Iran.

A different tradition holds that Jude suffered martyrdom about 65 AD in Beirut, in the Roman province of Syria during the 1st century in Lebanon together with the apostle Simon the Zealot, with whom he is usually connected. The axe that he is often shown holding in pictures symbolizes the way in which he was killed. Their acts and martyrdom were recorded in an Acts of Simon and Jude that was among the collection of passions and legends traditionally associated with the legendary Abdias, bishop of Babylon, and said to have been translated into Latin by his disciple Tropaeus Africanus, according to the Golden Legend account of the saints.

According to one account, Jude's body was brought from Beirut to Rome and placed in a crypt in St. Peter's Basilica which is visited by many devotees. His bones are in the left transept of St. Peter's Basilica under the main altar of St. Joseph, in one tomb with the remains of the apostle Simon the Zealot. These were moved here on 27 December 1665. An arm was removed from St. Jude's remains centuries ago and placed in a wooden reliquary carved in the shape of an upright arm imparting a blessing. From September 2023 to May 2024, the arm of Saint Jude Thaddeus went on a pilgrimage in the United States, making stops in 100 cities.

According to another popular tradition, the remains of Jude were preserved in an Armenian monastery on an island in the northern part of Issyk-Kul Lake in Kyrgyzstan at least until the mid-15th century.

A plain ossuary marked with the inscription "Judas Thaddaeus" (Ιουδας Θαδδαιου) was found in Kefar Barukh, Jezreel Valley, alongside fragments of four uninscribed ossuaries. The site was dated by lamps and other pottery to no later than the early second century.

== Iconography ==
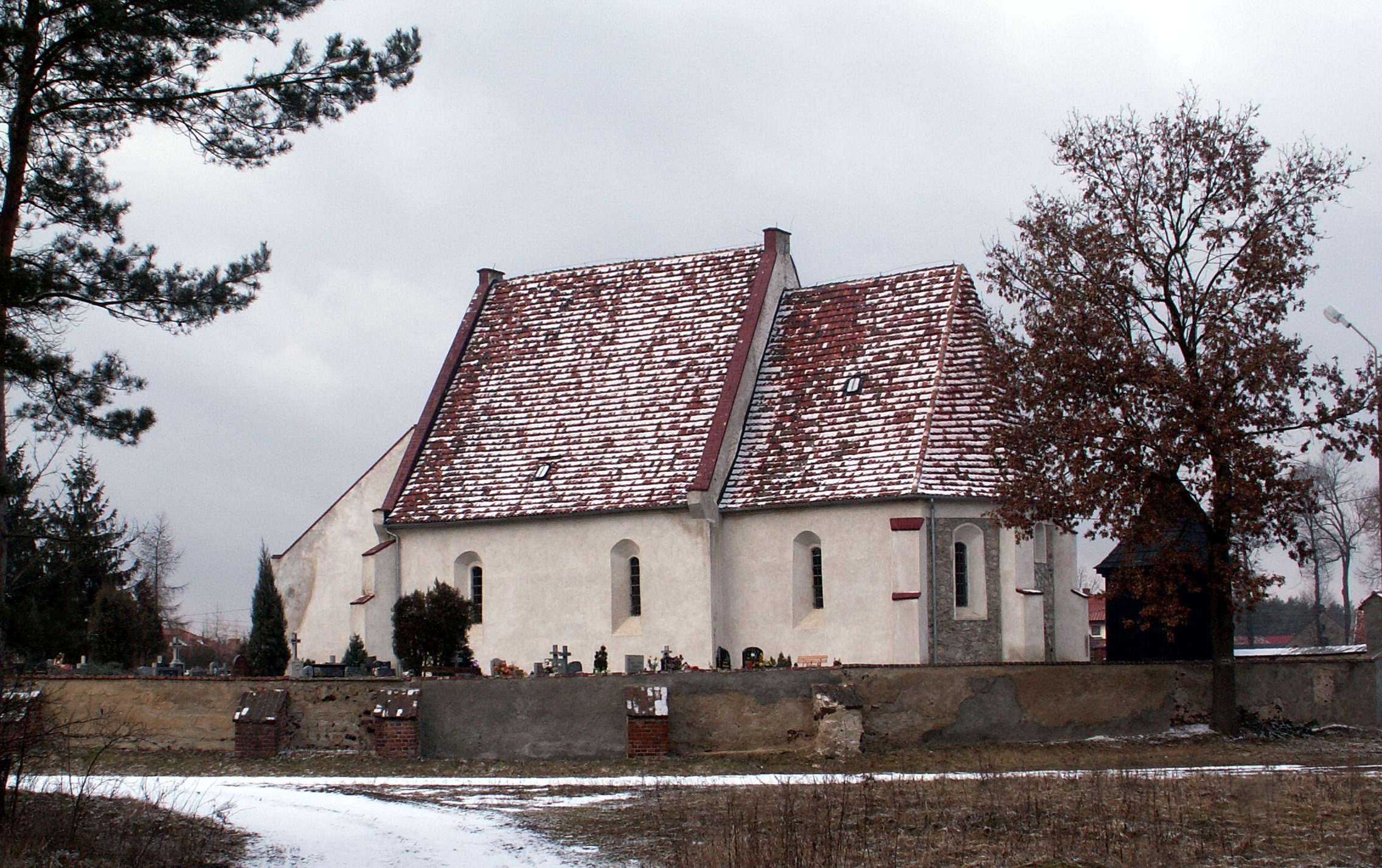
Church of Saints Simon and Jude Thaddeus in Rudno, Poland

Jude is traditionally depicted carrying the image of Jesus in his hand or close to his chest, betokening the legend of the Image of Edessa, also known as the legend of Abgar, a story resulting from the accretion of several narratives over the centuries. (The oldest source for the legend is Eusebius' Ecclesiastical History, I, xiii written between 311 and 325 A.D., reproducing apocryphal correspondence between Jesus and Abgar – but no mention of the image of Edessa – whilst details about the image appear notably in the Doctrine of Addai, written about 400 A.D., the Acts of Thaddaeus, probably written around 700 A.D., and the Narratio De Imagine Edessena composed in 944 A.D.). According to some versions of the legend, King Abgar of Edessa (now Şanlıurfa in southeast Turkey) sent a letter to Jesus seeking a cure for an illness afflicting him. With the letter he sent his envoy Hannan (also known as Ananias), the keeper of the archives, offering his own home city to Jesus as a safe dwelling place. The envoy painted a likeness of Jesus with choice paints (or alternatively, impressed with Abgar's faith, Jesus pressed his face into a cloth and gave it to Hannan) to take to Abgar with his answer. Upon seeing Jesus' image, the king placed it with great honor in one of his palatial houses. After Christ's execution, Thomas the Apostle sent Addai (identifiable with Thaddaeus and often conflated with Judas Thaddaeus), to King Abgar and the king was cured. Astonished, he converted to Christianity, along with many of the people under his rule. Additionally, Jude is often depicted with a flame above his head, representing his presence at Pentecost, when he was said to have received the Holy Spirit with the other apostles.

== Veneration ==
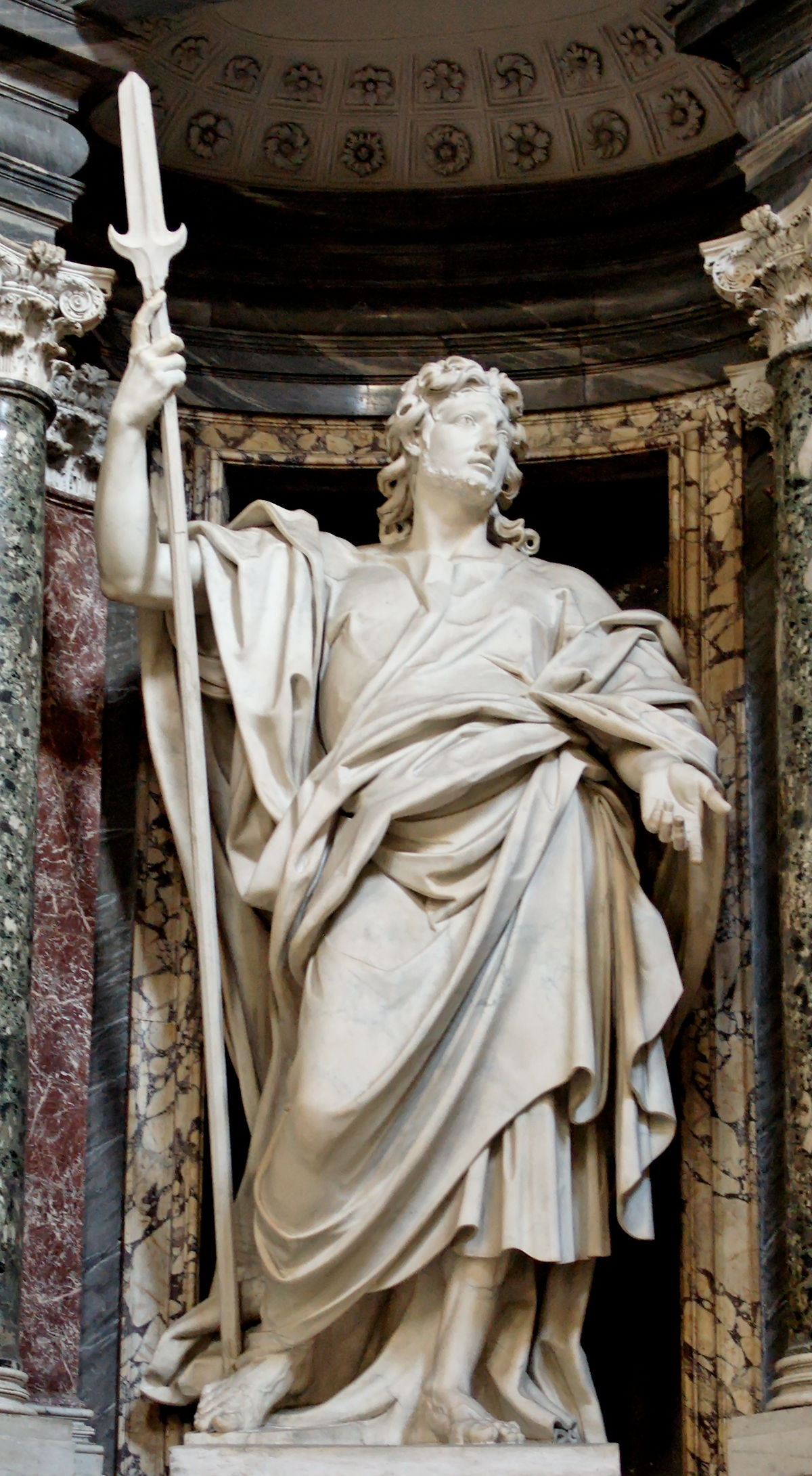
Statue of St. Jude in the Archbasilica of St. John Lateran by Lorenzo Ottoni

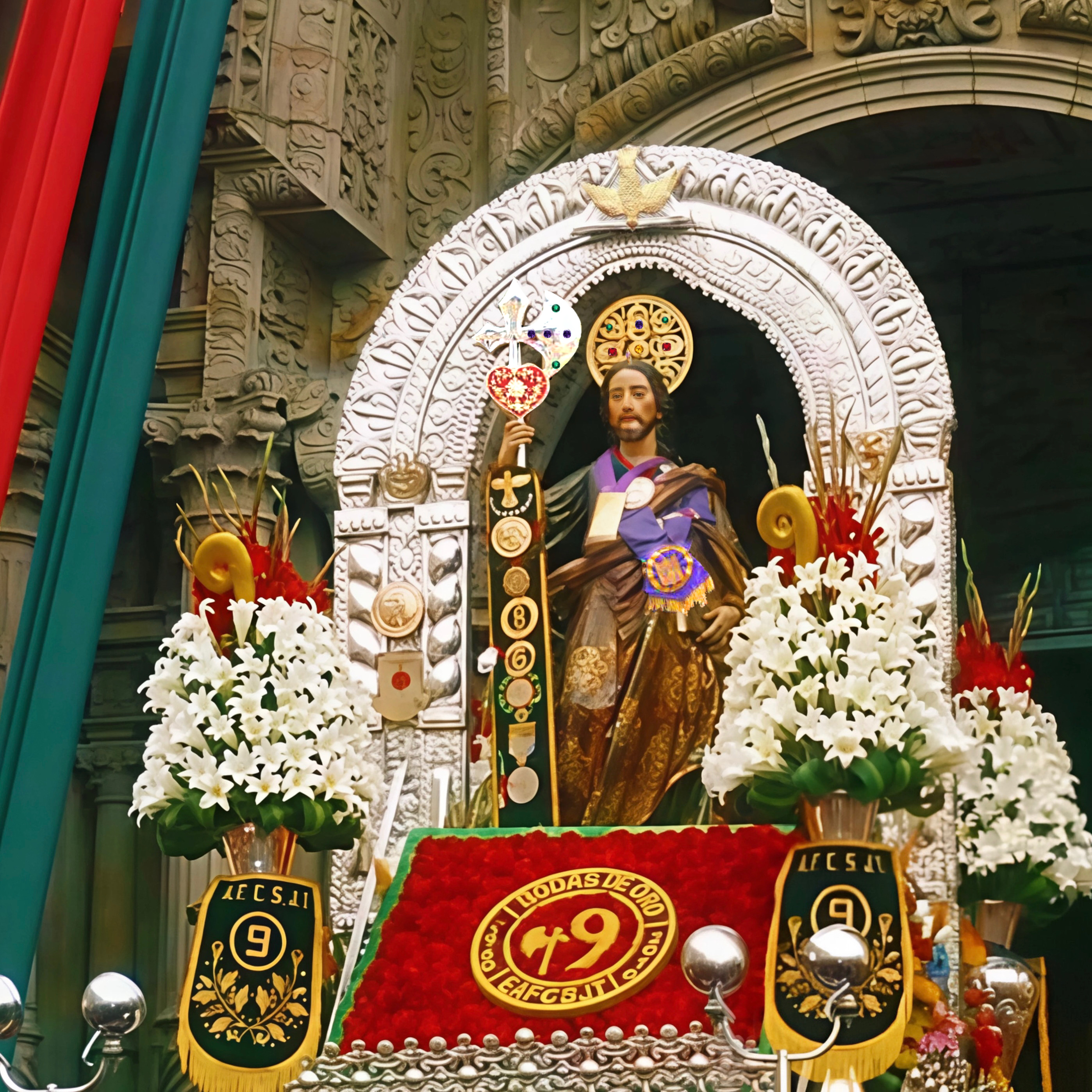
Procession in Lima, Peru

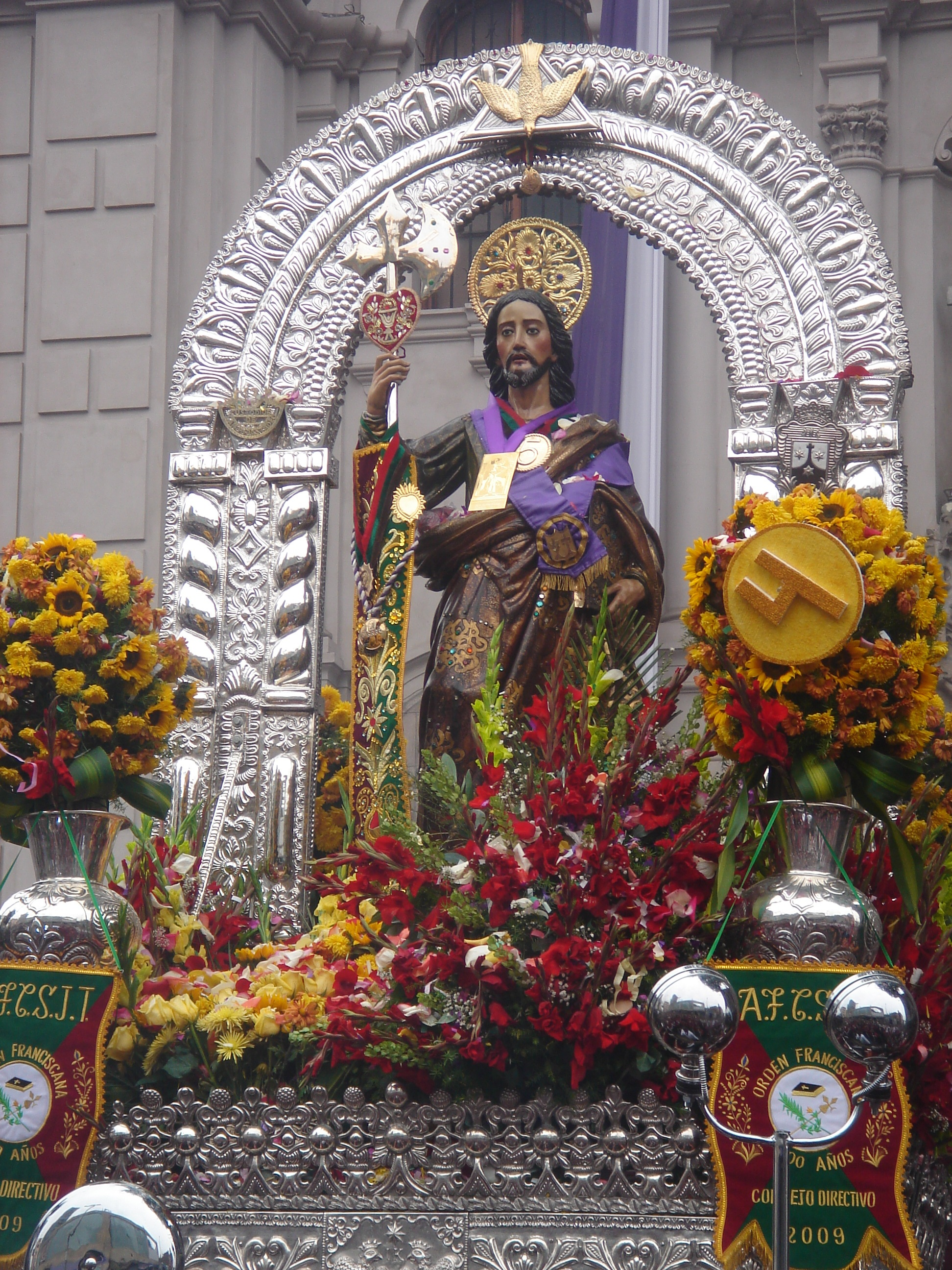
Other picture Procession in Lima, Peru

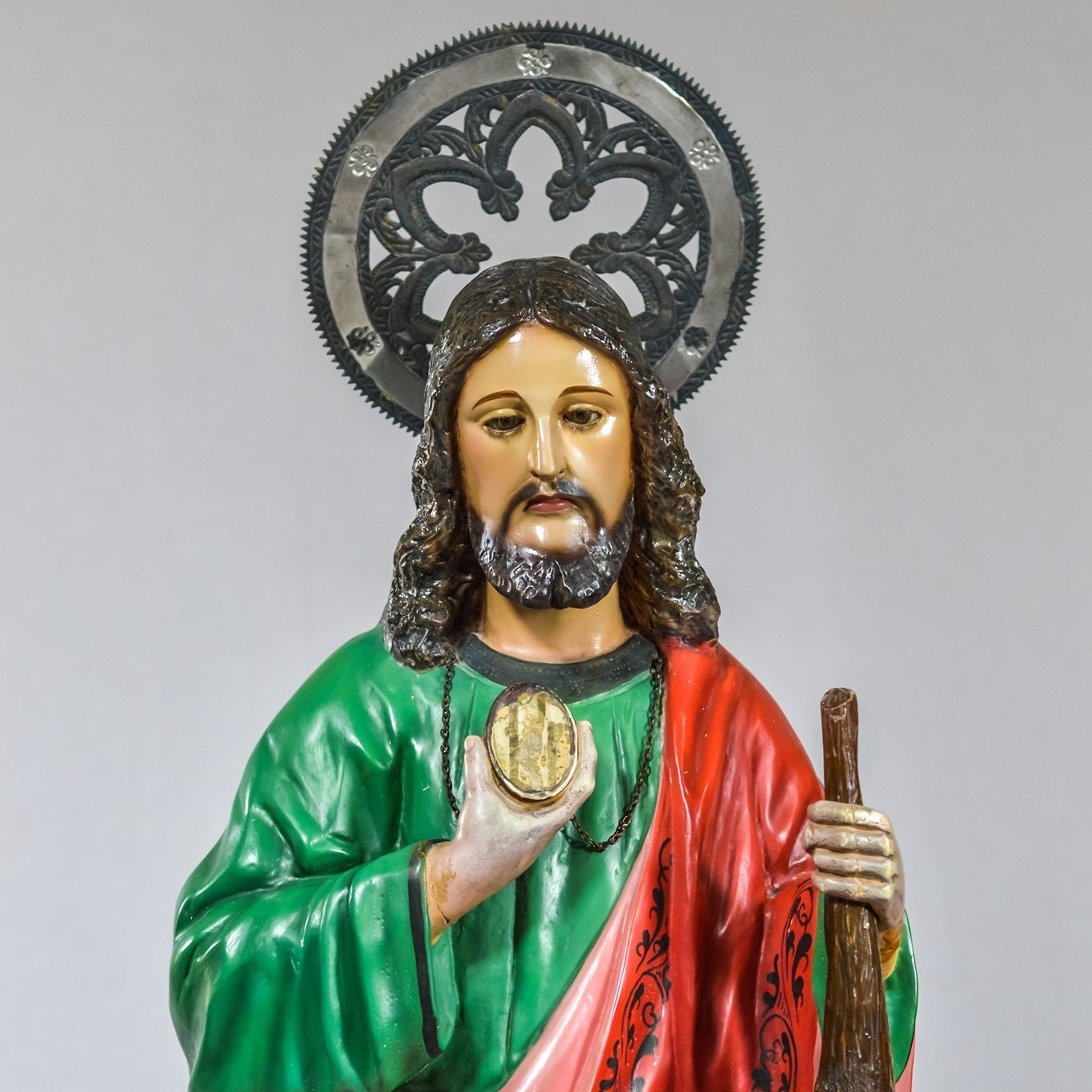
Image of Saint Jude Thaddeus in Saint Jude Thaddeus Mission Station, Malabon City, Philippines

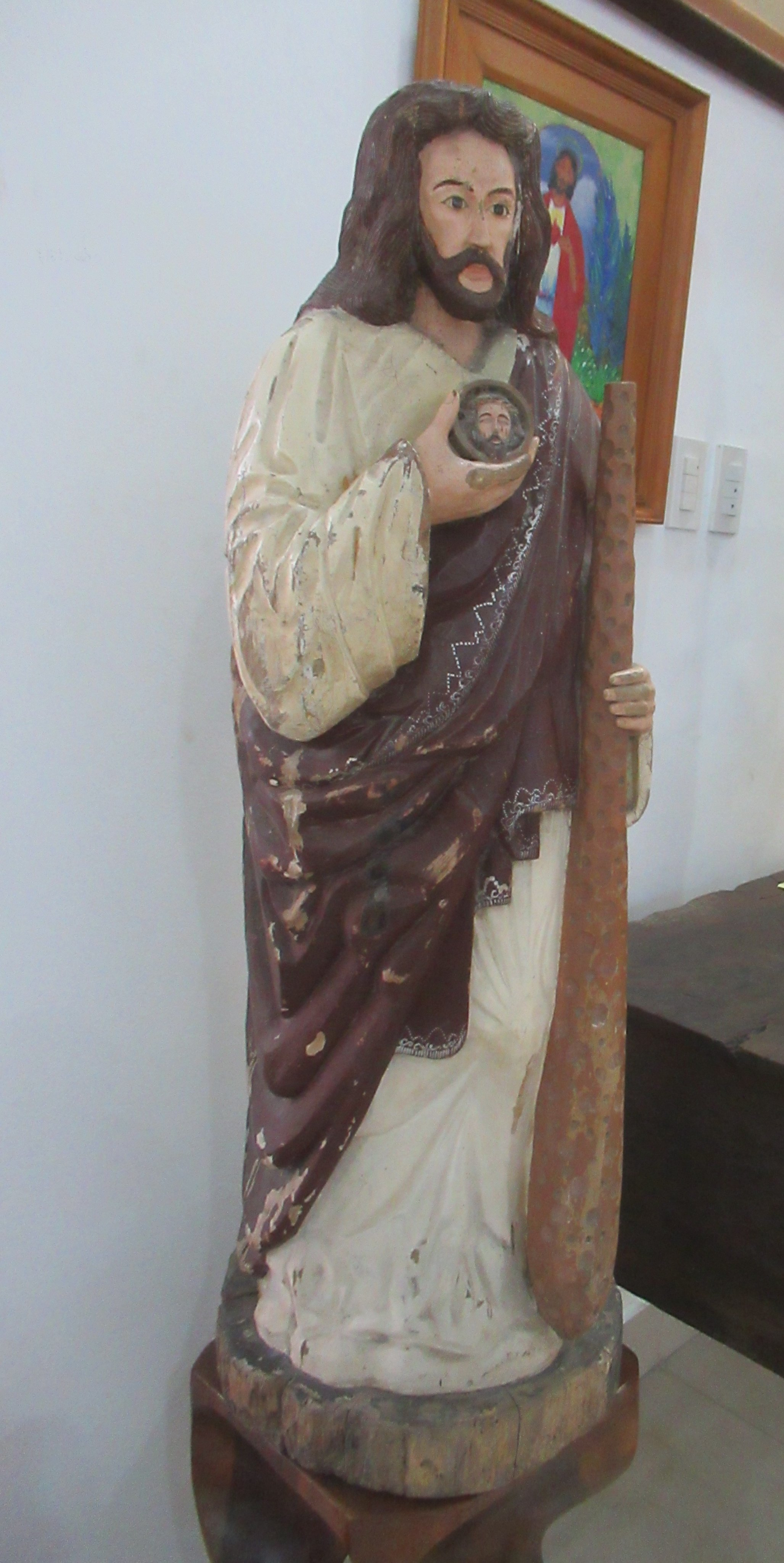
19th century statue of St. Jude in a Philippine museum

According to tradition, after his martyrdom, pilgrims came to his grave to pray and many of them experienced the powerful intercessions of St. Jude. Thus the title, 'The Saint for the Hopeless and the Despaired'. St. Bridget of Sweden and St. Bernard had visions from God asking each to accept St. Jude as 'The Patron Saint of the Impossible'. Jude is remembered (with Simon the Zealot) in the Church of England with a Festival on 28 October.

His feast day is 28 October (in the Roman Catholic Church, Anglican Communion, and Lutheran Church).

Apostle Jude son of James (Lebbaeus, Thaddaeus) the Brother of the Lord is commemorated on 19 June and 30 June (Synaxis of the Holy, Glorious and All-Praised Twelve Apostles) in the Eastern Orthodox Church.

The Order of Preachers (better known as the Dominicans) began working in present-day Armenia soon after their founding in 1216. At that time, there was already a substantial devotion to Saint Jude by both Catholic and Orthodox Christians in the area. This lasted until Muslim persecution drove Christians from the area in the 18th century. Devotion to Saint Jude began again in earnest in the 19th century, starting in Italy and Spain, spreading to South America and finally to the United States (starting in the vicinity of Chicago) owing to the influence of the Claretians who established the National Shrine of St. Jude in 1929.

Thaddeus of Edessa, an Apostle of the Seventy (sometimes identified as Jude Thaddaeus, one of the Twelve Apostles) is commemorated on 21 August and 4 January (Synaxis of the Seventy Apostles) in the Eastern Orthodox Church.

=== Patronage ===
Among some Roman Catholics, Jude is venerated as the "patron saint of hopeless causes". This practice is said to stem from the belief that few Christians invoked him for misplaced fear of praying to Christ's betrayer, Judas Iscariot, because of their similar names. The ignored Jude thus supposedly became quite eager to assist anyone who sought his help, to the point of interceding in the most dire of circumstances.

Jude is the patron saint of the Chicago Police Department, of Clube de Regatas do Flamengo (a soccer team in Rio de Janeiro, Brazil) and of two St Jude's GAA teams, the first in Templeogue Dublin 6W and also St Jude's GAA club in Southampton & Bournemouth (UK). His other patronages include desperate situations and hospitals. One of his namesakes is St. Jude Children's Research Hospital in Memphis, Tennessee, which has helped many children with terminal illnesses and their families since its founding in 1962.

=== Shrines and churches ===
Many countries venerate the Apostle Jude and have constructed shrines or churches dedicated to his memory. Such sites include those in Australia, Brazil, Sri Lanka, Cuba, India, Iran, the Philippines, New Zealand, the United Kingdom, the United States and Lebanon. The Nationwide Center of St. Jude Devotions in Baltimore was founded in 1917 by the Pallottines. The National Shrine of Saint Jude Thaddeus in the Philippines was erected by the Archdiocese of Manila in 1954 as Espíritu Santo Chinese Parish. The Shrine holds the saint's novena liturgy every Thursday and is now under the Society of the Divine Word that also runs the attached Saint Jude Catholic School. The National Shrine of Saint Jude at Faversham in England was founded in 1955. There is also a shrine of St. Jude built by the Dominicans (Order of Preachers) in Lagos, Nigeria.

The cathedral of the Roman Catholic Diocese of Phoenix, Arizona is the Cathedral of Saints Simon and Jude. There is also another cathedral located in St Petersburg, Florida, that serves as the head of the Roman Catholic Diocese of St Petersburg, named Cathedral of Saint Jude the Apostle in honor of the city's patronage saint.

== In Islam ==
The Quranic account of the disciples of Jesus does not include their names, numbers, or any detailed accounts of their lives. Muslim exegesis, however, more or less agrees with the New Testament list and says that the disciples included Peter, Philip, Thomas, Bartholomew, Matthew, Andrew, James, Jude, John and Simon the Zealot.

== See also ==
- Judas the Zealot
- Statue of Jude the Apostle, Charles Bridge
- Veneration of Judas Thaddaeus (San Judas Tadeo) in Mexico
