= Hugo Baldomero Medina Garza =

Mexican drug lord (born 1958)

- Born: 1958 (age 67–68); San Fernando, Tamaulipas, Mexico
- Other names: Lic. Garza; Gordo Medina; El Rey de los Tráilers; El Señor Padrino de los Tráilers
- Occupation: Gulf Cartel leader
- Predecessor: Juan García Ábrego
- Criminal penalty: 11½ years in prison
- Criminal status: Imprisoned

Hugo Baldomero Medina Garza (born 1958) is a Mexican drug lord and leader of the Gulf Cartel. He is known as El Señor Padrino de los Tráilers ("Lord of the Trailers") for shipping large sums of Colombian narcotics in trucks through Mexico, to later smuggle them across the international border into the United States.

Recognized for his ability to make money, Medina Garza was appointed as the head of the Gulf Cartel in Reynosa, Tamaulipas in 1996, soon after the arrest of the organization's co-founder Juan García Ábrego. His reign in Reynosa, however, was confronted by several drug traffickers who wanted to take control of the city.

He was listed on the FBI’s most wanted list in 2007, and is believed to still be conducting the Gulf Cartel’s operations in Reynosa and Matamoros.

== Criminal career ==
=== Early life and initiation ===
Hugo Baldomero Medina Garza was born in the Mexican city of San Fernando, Tamaulipas around the year 1958. His family owned a successful trailer company known as Mercancía Bamega, where Medina Garza worked before joining the drug trade. Medina Garza did poorly in school, and dropped out of college while studying agronomy to pursue a career at the trailer company with his father. In 1992, Medina Garza began to work at the local drug trade. Another report states that Medina Garza owned a cafeteria in the outskirts of San Fernando, where he managed to meet police commanders and drug traffickers, including the Gulf Cartel co-founder Juan García Ábrego, who invited him to join the cartel full-time in 1994.

=== Reign in Matamoros ===
When García Ábrego was arrested in January 1996, his right-hand man Óscar Malherbe de León appointed Medina Garza as the gatekeeper of the smuggling routes in Matamoros, Tamaulipas, and as one of García Ábrego's successors. Medina Garza was recognized by his colleagues for his ability to make money, for being discrete, and for his friendship with the drug lord Amado Carrillo Fuentes ("Lord of the Skies"), whom he met through his friend Ángel Salvador Gómez Herrera ("El Chava"), a policeman-turned-drug trafficker. (Note: When Juan García Ábrego was arrested and immediately extradited to the United States in 1996, the Mexican authorities alleged that the criminal dynasty of the Gulf Cartel was crumbling; at the same time, the Tijuana Cartel consolidated itself through extreme violence, while Juárez Cartel dominated aerial drug trafficking shipments.) During his time in Matamoros, an ex-marine that worked for the Gulf Cartel, Rafael Olvera López ("El Raffles"), complained that he worked a lot but did not earn what he expected. Humberto García Ábrego (brother of Juan) and Malherbe de León grew suspicious of Olvera López's remarks, and warned Medina Garza that he was a possible threat to his reign in Matamoros.

One day in 1996, Olvera López was called on by Medina Garza's henchmen to pay him a visit at his office for a private talk. Olvera López, who was well-versed with weapons, took his Magnum pistol. Hours later, Olvera López went to the offices of Baldomero Medina with two of his loyal bodyguards, nicknamed El Capi and El Cipri. At the door, one of Medina Garza's guards told Olvera López that he wanted to see him alone, so his bodyguards waited at the sitting room. Inside, Olvera López was greeted by Medina Garza, who told him to take a seat in front of his desk. He noticed, however, that El Chava Gómez was behind him sitting down on a sofa. Olvera López lighted a cigarette, while Medina Garza told him, "You know why I called you here? I was thinking of a new business perspective for you." As he spoke, Medina Garza tilted to his side to pull a pistol; Olvera López reacted by pulling his too but El Chava Gómez shot him in the head from behind. Having survived the first shot, Medina Garza finished him with another one on his head. He then ordered his men to get rid of the corpse.

Medina Garza earned his nickname El Señor de los Tráilers ("Lord of the Trailers") for smuggling large sums of marijuana and cocaine from Mexico into the United States using a fleet of trailers from his privately owned company. He also had several fishing companies in the cities of San Fernando, Tampico, Veracruz and Campeche, and used its boats to hide narcotics and ship them to El Mezquital port in Matamoros. In addition, the Mexican authorities allege that Medina Garza had several businessmen in Matamoros and Tampico that laundered his money at hotels, restaurants, and exchange houses. He reportedly had interest in owning a newspaper in Campeche, where he supposedly had several journalists already on his payroll.

On 17 April 1997, Medina Garza was reportedly shot in the face by gunmen of El Chava Gómez after he had resisted an abduction. The rapid medical intervention saved Medina Garza's life, and he had to retire temporarily from the drug trade. He was interned for two years in Monterrey where he underwent plastic surgery. Conflict between these two drug traffickers prevailed until 1999, when El Chava Gómez was assassinated. Having recovered from his surgery in 1999, Medina Garza returned to take control of the Gulf Cartel by directing cocaine shipments coming in from Colombia into southern Tamaulipas, prompting confrontations with another drug lord, Osiel Cárdenas Guillén. By the end of his career, Medina Garza separated from the Gulf Cartel and began to work independently.

=== Arrest and sentence ===
Following a traffic accident in the port city of Tampico, Tamaulipas, Medina Garza was arrested by the Mexican Army and police at around three in the afternoon on 1 November 2000 while pending several charges on drug trafficking, illegal use of firearms, and money laundering. Immediately after he was apprehended, Medina Garza was taken to Ciudad Victoria capital city and later transferred to Mexico City for questioning. (Note: Another source mentions that he was arrested at a hotel zone near the Miramar beach in Tampico, Tamaulipas while traveling alone in his vehicle at night.)

He was sentenced to 30 years in prison in November 2004, but a Mexican federal tribunal overturned it to an 11 1/2-year sentence in March 2008.

On 5 February 2016, one of the officers who participated in his arrest was murdered in Tampico. He was allegedly part of a kidnapping ring.

== Personal life and family ==
Medina Garza's habitual residence was in the state of San Luis Potosí, where he controlled a network of trucks that moved narcotics into the U.S. He was married with the daughter of Josué Flores, a businessman from the city of Ciudad Victoria, Tamaulipas.

In 2008, Medina Garza's cousin Adalberto Garza Dragustinovis was identified by the authorities as a leading member in the Gulf Cartel, and was accused of trying to regroup the cartel's armed wing, Los Zetas, despite growing opposition from other leaders in the organization. He had several businesses in northern Mexico, but his links with organized crime have not been confirmed and the case is still open. Delia Garza is also a relative of him; she was the former mayoral candidate in San Fernando for the Institutional Revolutionary Party (PRI).

== See also ==
- Mexican drug war

== Sources ==
=== Bibliography ===
- Garcia Cabrera, Jose Luis (2012). 1920-2000 ¡El Pastel! Parte Dos (in Spanish). Palibrio. p. 380. ISBN 978-1463337018.
- Ravelo, Ricardo (2012). Osiel. Vida y tragedia de un capo (in Spanish). Random House. p. 252. ISBN 978-6074294859.
