= Líctor Hazael Marroquín García =

Mexican criminal

- Born: Líctor Hazael Marroquín García; 1942 or 1943; Matamoros, Tamaulipas, Mexico
- Died: 7 May 1985 (aged 42–43); Matamoros, Tamaulipas, Mexico
- Criminal charge: Transporting stolen vehicles using foreign commerce
- Criminal penalty: 5 years (sentence suspended)
- Criminal status: Convicted
- Spouse: Beatriz Martha Hernández Simental

Notes
- Convicted by United States District Court for the Southern District of Texas in Brownsville

Líctor Hazael Marroquín García ([ˈliɣtoɾ aˈsael maroˈkiŋ ɡaɾˈsia]; 1942/1943 – 7 May 1985) was a Mexican criminal and convicted vehicle thief. He was the best friend of drug kingpin Juan García Abrego, the former leader of the Gulf Cartel, a criminal group based in Tamaulipas, Mexico. In 1978, Marroquín García was indicted by the U.S. District Court of the Southern District of Texas in Brownsville for transporting stolen vehicles from the U.S. into Mexico. He was charged along with seventeen other people, including García Abrego, who was a low-level criminal at that time. Convicted in 1979, Marroquín García had his sentence suspended and was deported back to Mexico. He died of cirrhosis in 1985.

== Early life ==
Líctor Hazael Marroquín García was born in Matamoros, Tamaulipas, Mexico, in 1942 or 1943. His parents were Ovidio Marroquín Salinas and Evangelina García de Marroquín. He had two brothers, César Ovidio and Cid Mario. Marroquín García was the best friend of drug kingpin Juan García Abrego, the former leader of the Gulf Cartel, a criminal group based in Tamaulipas, Mexico. Though usually reserved with others, García Abrego was very close to Marroquín García and spoke to him about personal matters. Marroquín García's mother said she remembered García Abrego as a "good boy".

== Criminal career ==
According to an indictment sworn in by a grand jury of the U.S. District Court for the Southern District of Texas in Brownsville on 8 November 1978, sometime between 2 September and 11 October 1978, Marroquín García and seventeen other individuals, including García Abrego, unlawfully transported stolen vehicles from the U.S. into Mexico in violation of a federal code dealing with illegal interstate or foreign commerce. In total, six tractor trailer trucks, three truck trailers, and 44,833 lb (20,336 kg; 22.417 short tons) of stainless steel coils and skids were stolen from San Antonio, Corpus Christi and Houston. All of these goods were transported to Brownsville, where most were then smuggled and sold in Mexico. The indictment specified that on or around 10 September, Marroquín García met with García Abrego, David Lee Kuehn, Richard Wayne Cotton, and Jesús María González ("Chuy" or "Chema") in Brownsville to coordinate the transfer of a 1977 Kenworth Truck Tractor. The vehicle was stolen by Richard Wayne Cotton, Thomas Scott Bates ("Slick"), and Richard Cook in Houston. Marroquín García drove the tractor from Brownsville to Mexico on or around that date. (Note: The tractor had Texas license plate number R34330.)

On or around 11 October, Cotton, Bates, and Gregory Nathan Fee stole a 1977 Kenworth Truck Tractor and a flat-bed trailer in San Antonio and transported them to Brownsville. The indictment stated that Marroquín García met with García Abrego, González, Fred B. Rendon, Jr., and Saúl Hernández Rivera in Brownsville to discuss arrangements. U.S. authorities stated that Marroquín García and the other co-defendants knew the vehicles were stolen. (Note: The tractor had vehicle identification number (VIN) P158381.) The tractors were owned by a man identified as Leroy Eash; their loss totaled US$10,000. The U.S. attorneys for the case were J. A. "Tony" Canales and Charles Lewis; the court's clerk was V. Bailey Thomas and the jury foreman was James D. Cook. The investigation was led by the Texas Department of Public Safety with the assistance of local Federal Bureau of Investigation (FBI) officials. When the indictment was issued, García Abrego was a low-level criminal and was not the leader of the Gulf Cartel.

On 13 October, Marroquín García was arrested in Brownsville, along with Rendón and Kuehn. Justice of Peace Alex Perez set a US$5,000 bond for all three individuals. Their defense asked the official to reduce the bond amount to something more "reasonable", but Perez rejected the motion, saying that the bond he requested was recommended by the State of Texas. Following discussions over the bond, Perez discovered that Marroquín García did not understand English, so he proceeded to explain the arrangement in Spanish. On 4 March 1979, Marroquín García was convicted of transporting stolen vehicles using foreign commerce and was sentenced to five years in prison. However, his conviction included an execution of sentence suspended (ESS), which cancelled his sentence as long as he did not violate any conditions set during the term of his probation. He was given five-year's probation without supervision. Marroquín García was deported back to Mexico shortly after the announcement of his conviction.

== Death ==
At 17:00 hours on 7 May 1985, (Note: Another source incorrectly stated that he died on 22 August 1985.) Marroquín García died of cirrhosis in Matamoros. According to details provided by Dr. José Luis Martínez Ortiz, he suffered from esophageal varices and bled from a massive proximal digestive tube. (Note: His death certificate was registered by government officials José de la Cruz Flores and Alicia D. de Ríos on 13 May. Witnesses J. Antonio Solís and Antonio Meléndez signed off and confirmed his death.) His family held a wake at the Lozano funeral home. He was buried in Jardín cemetery the following day. At the time of his death, Marroquín García was married to Beatriz Martha Hernández Simental. Marroquín García's mother said that García Abrego was deeply saddened by his death and cried "inconsolably" at one of his ranches. García Abrego sent flowers to Marroquín García's grave every year on his death date and on the Day of the Dead until his arrest in 1996. Over the years, García Abrego befriended a man named Luis Medrano García, who later became a high-ranking Gulf Cartel member. Those close to García Abrego said that he became more reserved with others, including people with whom he was also friends, after Marroquín García died.

== See also ==
- Mexican drug war

== Bibliography ==
- García Cabrera, Jose Luis (2012). 1920–2000 ¡El Pastel! Parte Dos (in Spanish). Palibrio. ISBN 978-1463337018.
- Thomas, V. Bailey (1978). United States of America v. Lictor Hazael Marroquin-Garcia. Brownsville, Texas: United States District Court for the Southern District of Texas.
