= Norma Moreno Figueroa =

Mexican crime journalist and murder victim

- Born: Norma Alicia Moreno Figueroa; 24 June 1962; Matamoros, Tamaulipas, Mexico
- Died: 17 July 1986 (aged 24); Mexico
- Cause of death: Murder
- Occupation: Crime journalist

Norma Alicia Moreno Figueroa (24 June 1962 – 17 July 1986) was a Mexican journalist. She was the first Mexican woman journalist to die violently because of her work covering the Mexican drug war.

== Early life and education ==
She was born in Matamoros, Tamaulipas, the daughter of Laurentino Moreno and Margarita Figueroa. In 1974, she won the 1st and 2nd place in contests open to primary school students and in 1978, won the speech contest open to students at her level. She belonged to the "Rodriguez Brayra" literary circle, where she presented multiple works of her poetry.

She was permanent member of the House of Fine Arts in Matamoros. She was one of the first students in the Faculty of Communication Sciences at the University of Matamoros and was president of the Society of Students from the 1983-84 graduating class.

== Professional life and work ==
She was a member of the National Action Party, PAN, and actively participating in conferences local, state and national. At the age of sixteen, she joined the newspaper El Bravo de Matamoros, in the section covering social events, from which she gradually was promoted into a position as a reporter and columnist.

In what was to be her final position with the Matamoros newspaper, El Popular, she wrote the column "Finding Paths" and also served as managing editor. In addition, she was notorious for her role as a reporter for XEEW, a radio station of Jorge Cardenas Gonzalez that serves the Matamoros and Brownsville, Texas, areas.

In 1986, her journalistic work received a recognition from UNESCO, heading to the city of Quito, Ecuador.

Her style courageously exposed corruption of political officials, drug trafficking and she fiercely defended of freedom of expression, public problems entailed her with politicians and especially the continuing threat of organized crime.

== Death and aftermath ==
She died on July 17, 1986, at the age of 24, the victim of an attack by unknown gunmen with automatic weapons at the entrance of the publishing house where she used to work. The day prior to her death, she had written a column in El Popular that attacked Matamoros Mayor Jesús Roberto Guerra Velasco, a relative of Gulf Cartel founder Juan Nepomuceno Guerra ("MEPI Article"). With her death she became the first woman to lose her life in Mexico as a result of her work as a journalist.

After her death, she was recognized by newspapers and international agencies as well as the United States Drug Enforcement Administration.

== See also ==
- Mexican drug war
- List of journalists killed in Mexico
