= Óscar Malherbe de León =

Mexican drug lord (born 1964)

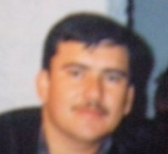
- Born: 10 January 1964 (age 62); Mexico
- Other names: El Licenciado; Martín Becerra Mireles
- Occupation: Gulf Cartel leader
- Term: 1976–1997
- Predecessor: Juan García Abrego
- Criminal status: Imprisoned

Óscar Malherbe de León (born 10 January 1964) is a Mexican imprisoned drug lord and former high-ranking leader of the Gulf Cartel, a criminal group based in Tamaulipas. He was the main intermediary of the Gulf Cartel in Colombia, responsible for shipping large sums of cocaine from the Cali Cartel in the 1990s. Before becoming a drug trafficker, Malherbe worked as a shoeshiner and car washer. He then turned to the auto theft industry and was recruited in 1976 by Casimiro Espinosa Campos (alias El Cacho), a former leader of a cell within the Gulf Cartel. By age 22, the Mexican authorities had charged Malherbe with at least 10 homicides. In 1984, Espinosa was killed by Juan García Abrego, then-leader of the Gulf Cartel, who later appointed Malherbe as one of his top lieutenants and moneymen.

Under García Abrego, Malherbe coordinated cocaine shipments from Colombia via aircraft into Tamaulipas before they were smuggled by land to the United States. García Abrego was arrested in January 1996 and Malherbe became his successor. However, his leadership was short-lived; about a year later in February 1997 in Mexico City, he was apprehended at a shopping center and imprisoned at Federal Social Readaptation Center No. 1, where he now serves his sentence.

== Early life and career ==
Óscar Malherbe de León was born in Mexico on 10 January 1964. Before joining the drug trade, he was a shoeshiner and a car washer for several local drug lords, then turned to car theft. In 1976 he was recruited by crime boss Casimiro Espinosa Campos (alias El Cacho) to join the Gulf Cartel. Espinosa Campos headed a criminal cell in Matamoros that oversaw the area's auto theft industry, drug trafficking rings, protection rackets, and the cartel's score-settlings. By the 1980s, Malherbe's notoriety within the Gulf Cartel grew because he proved to be a cold-blooded and cunning assassin. At the age of 22, he was indicted by the Public Ministry of Matamoros (Spanish: Ministerio Público de Matamoros) and was alleged to have been involved in at least 10 homicides from 1983 to 1984. The name of the late Luis Medrano García, another leader in the Gulf Cartel arrested in 1993 in Ciudad Juárez, also appeared in the indictment. Medrano and Malherbe usually worked together by supervising the drug trafficking shipments in the corridor of Matamoros, Tamaulipas. Both of them had from six to eight armed henchmen watching their backs inside a walled compound from where they hid and gave orders.

In 1984, however, Espinosa Campos's reign underwent a challenge when Juan García Abrego, the head of the Gulf Cartel, wanted him dead. Their rivalry for the control of the Gulf Cartel prompted several killings in Matamoros, but García Abrego managed to kill Espinosa Campos in May 1984, thereby taking control of the criminal organization and aligning it under a single command structure. With Espinosa Campos dead, his gang disintegrated and joined the lines of García Abrego, marking the beginning of the modern Gulf Cartel. Malherbe, once close to Espinosa Campos's gang, went on to work with García Abrego and later became one of his most trusted lieutenants and moneymen. In 1990, Malherbe supervised the Gulf Cartel's cocaine shipments that arrived to the U.S.-Mexico border via aircraft, and was allegedly responsible of arming and handing out uniforms of the Federal Judicial Police to his gunmen. The drugs were supplied by the Rodriguez Orihuela brothers of the Cali Cartel and arrived in clandestine runaways in San Fernando and Matamoros, Tamaulipas. They were then smuggled by land to the United States for future distribution. He was the main enlace (intermediary) of the Gulf Cartel in Colombia, where he held business relations with the top echelons of the Cali Cartel. The supremacy of the Gulf Cartel reached its peak in the 1980s and early 1990s, when it controlled at least one-third of all the cocaine that entered the United States and reportedly made $20 billion annually.

Malherbe's boss headed the Gulf Cartel with a combination of "bribes, brutality and business acumen," and authorities on both sides of the border made him a top priority in the war on drugs. In 1995, García Abrego was placed on the FBI's Ten Most Wanted list; a year later in January 1996, he was arrested in a massive operation in northern Mexico and quickly extradited to the United States. Since the last months of 1995, the Gulf Cartel was having difficulty moving drugs into the United States, and only managed to introduced about a ton and a half of cocaine that year. Malherbe responded to this dilemma by forging an alliance with Amado Carrillo Fuentes of the Juárez Cartel, but the business partnership with him was short-lived. With García Abrego behind bars, his brother Humberto and Malherbe became his successors, though the latter only commanded the Gulf Cartel for a little more than a year.

== Arrest ==
Malherbe was arrested at a shopping center in the Mixcoac neighborhood of Mexico City on 26 February 1997. He reportedly tried to bribe Mexican officials with US$2 million to release him, which they refused. At the time of his arrest, he had pending accusations on conspiracy to buy, traffic, and sell cocaine and marijuana, alongside charges on homicide and illegal use of firearms under Mexican law. He was then sent to the Federal Social Readaptation Center No. 1 in Almoloya de Juárez, State of Mexico to serve his sentence. Though the U.S. authorities asked for his extradition to the United States, a Mexican judge ordered Malherbe to be tried in Mexico because he believed that the evidences against him were insufficient.

== Kingpin Act sanction ==
On 1 June 2001, the United States Department of the Treasury sanctioned Malherbe under the Foreign Narcotics Kingpin Designation Act (sometimes referred to simply as the "Kingpin Act"), for his involvement in drug trafficking along with eleven other international criminals. The act prohibited U.S. citizens and companies from doing any kind of business activity with Malherbe, and virtually froze all his assets in the U.S.

== See also ==
- Mexican drug war

== Sources ==
Bibliography

- Bailey, John J. (2000). Organized Crime and Democratic Governability: Mexico and the U.S.-Mexican Borderlands. University of Pittsburgh Press. p. 271. ISBN 0822972298.
- Helms, Jesse (1 June 1999). Mexican and American Responses to the International Narcotics Threat. DIANE Publishing. p. 142. ISBN 0788180088.
- Grayson, George W. (31 December 2011). Mexico: Narco-Violence and a Failed State?. Transaction Publishers. p. 275. ISBN 978-1412815512.
- Moreno, Norberto (2001). Almoloya, o el infierno de hielo. El Autor. p. 244. ISBN 9709302906.
- Vulliamy, Ed (26 October 2010). Amexica: War Along the Borderline. Macmillan Publishers. p. 384. ISBN 978-1429977029.
