= Luis Cresencio Sandoval =

Mexican general and politician (born 1960)

General Luis Cresencio Sandoval
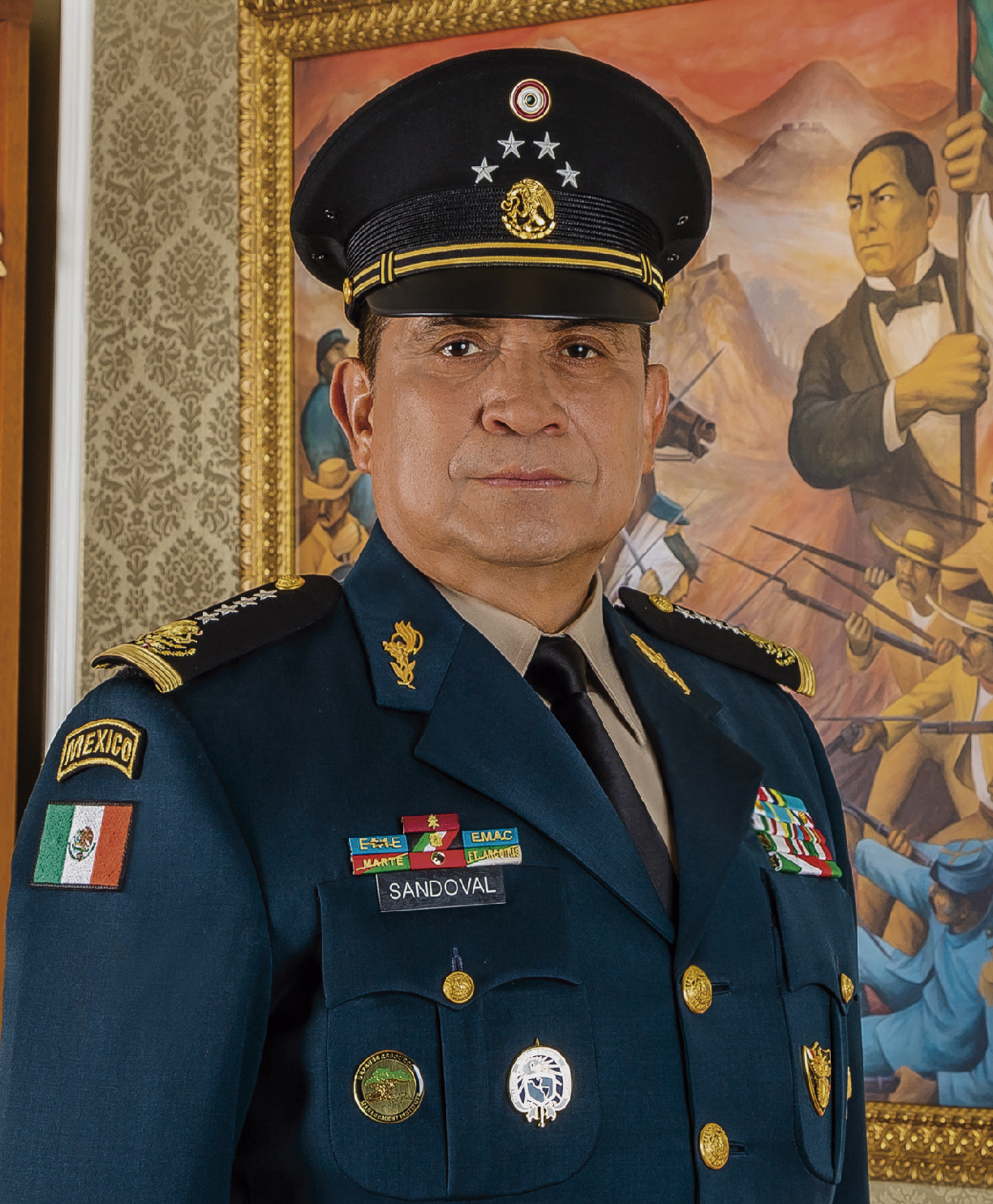
- Official portrait, 2018

Secretary of National Defense
- In office 1 December 2018 – 30 September 2024
- President: Andrés Manuel López Obrador
- Preceded by: Salvador Cienfuegos Zepeda
- Succeeded by: Ricardo Trevilla Trejo

Personal details
- Born: 7 February 1960 (age 66) Ensenada, Baja California, Mexico
- Education: Heroico Colegio Militar (BS, MS)

Military service
- Allegiance: Mexico
- Branch/service: Mexican Army
- Years of service: 1980–2024
- Rank: General
- Battles/wars: Mexican Dirty War; Chiapas conflict Sinaloa Cartel-Gulf Cartel conflict Mexican drug war: Infighting in the Gulf Cartel; Infighting in Los Zetas
- Awards: Legion of Honour

Luis Crescencio Sandoval González (born 7 February 1960) is the former Mexican Secretary of Defense.

== Biography ==
Luis Cresencio Sandoval Gonzalez was born on 7 February 1960 in Ensenada, Baja California. In the Heroic Military Academy he attended high school and studies of formation of army officers. He also graduated in administration military school Superior of war.

He holds a bachelor's degree in military administration from the National Superior School of War, and a master's degree in military administration for national defense and security.

Sandoval has served as a section Commander in the Third Battalion of Military Police in the City of Mexico; he was also Head of the Technical Section and Private Secretary of the Senior Officer of the SEDENA. He was Deputy Chief of Staff of the General Headquarters of the Military Zone of Colima 20, as well as Deputy Chief of Section Five and Six of the Presidential Staff, as well as Commander of the Fourth Military Region.

In a field of foreign policy, he was appointed as Added Military Assistant at the Mexican Embassy in the District of Columbia (United States).

Sandoval was awarded the Legion of Honour, given by the French Government.
