= Joint Operation Nuevo León-Tamaulipas =

Anti-drug operation in Mexico

Operation Nuevo León-Tamaulipas
- Part of Mexican drug war
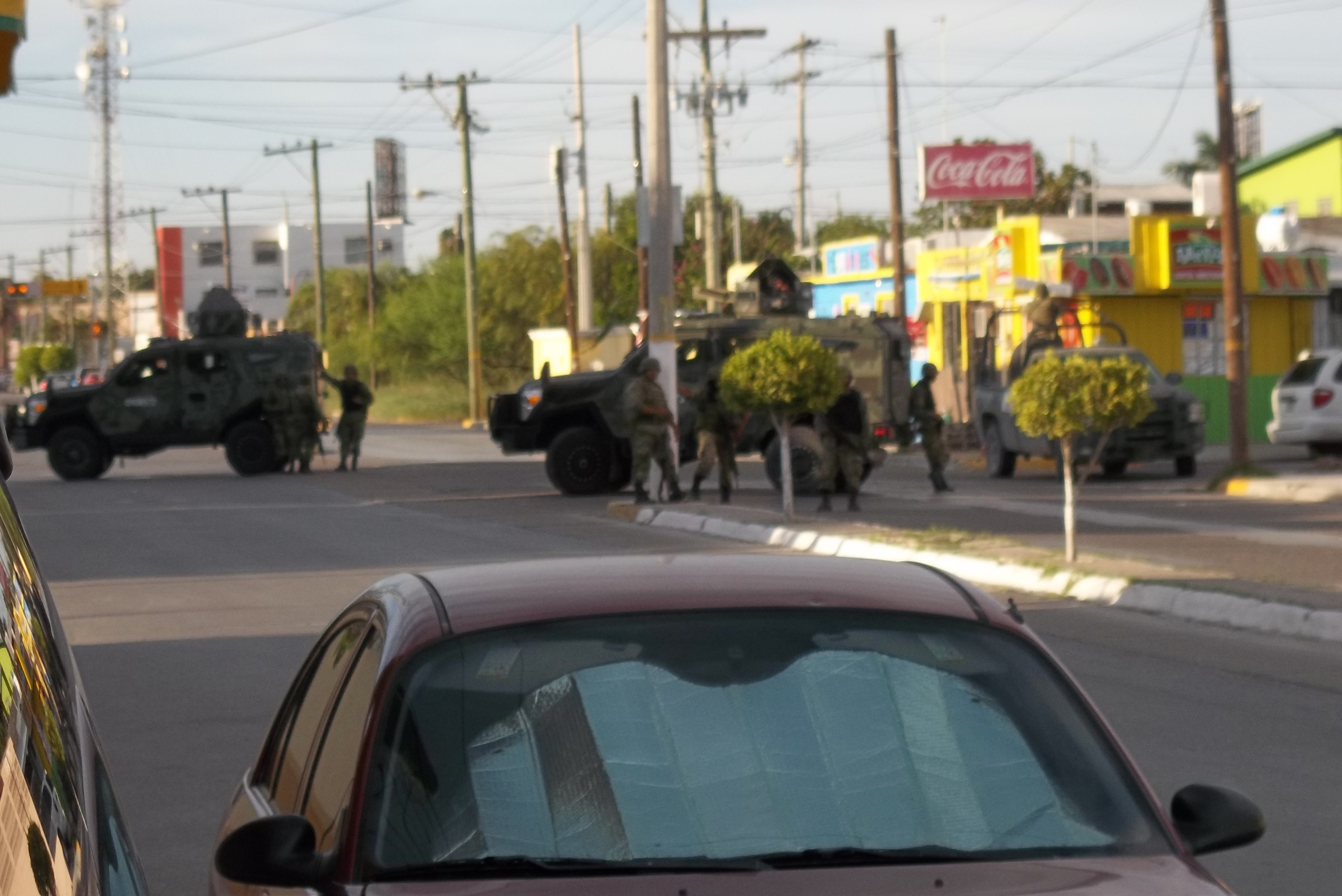
- Mexican Army raids a house in Matamoros, Tamaulipas
Date	2007–December 2013
Location	Nuevo León & Tamaulipas, Mexico
Result	Disbandment of Los Zetas: Divisions in the Gulf Cartel

Belligerents
Mexico; Mexican Army; Mexican Marines; Federal Police; Nuevo León State Troopers; Tamaulipas State Police	Gulf Cartel	Los Zetas

Commanders and leaders
(Mexico) Andrés Manuel López Obrador (2018–present) (Mexico) Enrique Peña Nieto (2012–18) (Mexico) Felipe Calderón (2007–12) (Mexico) Guillermo Galván Galván (2007–12) (Mexico) Salvador Cienfuegos Zepeda (2012–18) (Mexico) Luis Cresencio Sandoval (2018–present) (Mexico) Mariano Francisco Saynez Mendoza (2007–12) (Mexico) Vidal Francisco Soberón Sanz (2012–18) (Mexico) José Rafael Ojeda Durán (2018–present)	Jorge Costilla (POW)	Heriberto Lazcano †; Miguel Treviño (POW)

Strength
3,000+	1,000+	1,000+

Casualties and losses
Unknown	Unknown	Unknown

Joint Operation Nuevo León-Tamaulipas is an anti-drug joint operation in two Mexican states of Tamaulipas and Nuevo León by Federal Police and the Mexican Armed Forces. The objective of the joint operation is to eliminate Los Zetas and Gulf Cartel operations in the area. So far, many cartel members have been either killed or arrested. Recently Los Zetas and the Gulf Cartel have broken relations and started fighting each other.

== The arrest of Osiel Cárdenas ==
Osiel Cárdenas, leader of the Gulf Cartel at the time was captured by the Mexican Army in a battle between Gulf Cartel gunmen and the Army on March 14, 2003, in Matamoros. Though subsequently incarcerated at Penal del Altiplano (La Palma), México's top security prison, it was widely believed that he continued to have control over Gulf Cartel business from within prison walls.

== 2007 ==
- On April 3, in Tampico, elements of Federal Police, Mexican Navy, and Attorney General of Mexico (PGR) seized many weapons.
- On April 12, for the first time in the state of Nuevo León, army soldiers confronted cartel gunmen while searching houses in the municipality of Marín. One gunman was reported killed and two were arrested.
- On December 7, In Cadereyta, Nuevo León, army troops fought a gunbattle against gunmen leaving one of them injured and three them in captivity. Two kidnapped civilians were freed.

== 2008 ==
On January 7, In the city of Río Bravo, Tamaulipas, Federal Police forces spotted and began to pursuit a group of armed men. The pursuit came to a halt, the armed group began shooting at federal police officers, when Army and Federal Police reinforcements came to scene the gunmen sought cover in a building where the Military/Federal police confronted them killing 3 and arresting 10 of the armed group.

In the municipality of Miguel Alemán, Tamaulipas, on February 7, soldiers from the army's 1st Special Forces Battalion carrying out a recon mission spotted a suspect aboard a Grand Cherokee. When the suspect realized he was under surveillance he attempted to flee but was apprehended. Following the arrest the Special Forces team stormed a building arresting another four suspects and seizing nine tons of marijuana, 89 weapons plus a M1919 Browing machine gun.

On March 5, Army personnel from the 8th Military Zone acting on a tip given to the 15th Infantry Battalion arrested eight public officials that were receiving bribe money from undercover agents working for the Policia Ministerial (Ministerial Police). The public officials were subsequently handed over to the PGR's SIEDO.

On April 30, acting on an anonymous tip, Army personnel from the 1st Motorized Cavalry Regiment in the city of Ciudad Mier were fired upon by gunmen who fled. Subsequently, one cavalry soldier died while three others were injured and transported to the Regional Military Hospital in Monterrey.

== 2009 ==
=== Gunbattle in Reynosa ===
A multiple-hour running gun battle between elements of the Army and unknown attackers (sicarios) resulted in five dead soldiers and 5 dead assailants in a shopping district and several residential neighborhoods of Reynosa, Tamaulipas. Approximately 20 additional people were injured by gunfire and grenades.

=== Televisa grenade attack ===
On January 7, gunmen fired on and threw grenades at the Televisa TV station in Monterrey during a nightly newscast, causing no injuries. A note left on the scene read: "Stop reporting just on us. Report on the narco's political leaders."

=== Confrontations ===
On April 1, in Tampico, Tamaulipas, three gunmen were killed while in a 10‑minute gunfight with army troops.

=== Arrest of major suspects ===
On April 10, a lawyer who defends members of the Gulf cartel and Los Zetas was arrested.

An ex-Special Forces soldier of the Guatemalan Army known as Kaibiles and assumed leader of the Oaxaca state chapter of Los Zetas Israel Nava Cortez a.k.a. "El Ostión" was killed in a shootout between Federal Police forces.

On April 30, Federal Police captured Gregorio Sauceda Gamboa, an influential figure in Los Zetas, in the city of Matamoros.

On May 22, the Secretariat of Defense reported that one of the main lieutenants of the Gulf Cartel —Raymundo Almanza Morales, a.k.a.: "El Gori"— had been arrested by troops in Monterrey, Nuevo León. "El Gori" is among the 37 most wanted drug traffickers in Mexico.

On August 17, in the municipality of San Nicolás de los Garza, a gunbattle between soldiers, police forces and a Los Zetas cell in that municipality left three soldiers injured, four members of Los Zetas dead and twelve captured. One of the four dead was apparently the cell's leader, Refugio Garza Pescador, a.k.a. "El Rambo". After the gunfight it was discovered that one of the Zeta members was the daughter of a Municipal Police chief of Apodaca. The woman was pregnant at the time. It is suspected that the father of the unborn child is Refugio Garza Pescador.

== 2010 ==
Note: From February 8 to 18, Mexican Naval operations and events are listed below:

- February 8, – during a routine patrol in Reynosa, Marines received gunfire from inside several vehicles. Marines repelled the attack and captured three of the gunmen, 14 trucks, various assault rifles, ammunition, and 26 packages of marijuana. During the firefight three marines were killed and eight were injured. Three of the gunmen were also killed.
- February 11, – Matamoros, Tamaulipas, two individuals name Adolfo Vázquez Ortiz and José Alberto Ramírez Gaitán were arrested. The two men have been accused of being linked with organized crime and having a connection with a criminal group that was involved in the attack of marines on February 8, in Reynosa. Both men were sent to the federal authorities in Mexico City.
- February 12, – In Méndez, Tamaulipas, Marines raided the ranch of "El Culebreño". Naval personnel discovered and seized: 5 assault rifles, 2 pistols, ammunition, one package of marijuana, and 8 vehicles.
- February 15, – In Reynosa, Tamaulipas. Mexican Marines captured Treviño Cardoza “El Trevi” a known member of Los Zetas along with 6 accomplices. "El Trevi" is known for drug smuggling specifically marijuana. During the course of the operation marines received gunfire from the suspects and returned fire which led to his capture.
- February 18, – Near Reynosa, PEMEX personnel informed the Military that armed men were present in a PEMEX installation. A Naval helicopter was dispatched and spotted three suspicious vehicles. Marines disembarked the helicopter and were met with gunfire. Marines repelled the attack and captured 5 vehicles, inside them were packages of marijuana weighing 4,413 kilos. The gunmen managed to flee.
  - On the same day, due to the success of air-sea patrols, and checkpoints in Valle Hermoso, Tamaulipas, four drug traffickers, 4 trucks, 2 assault rifles, 9 rifle magazines and 186 cartridges were seized.

Note: From March 4–5 Mexican Naval operations are listed below:

- March 4, – In Monterrey, Nuevo León. Navy personnel in a joint operation with Federal Police forces raided a home in downtown Mpnterrey. The raid disrupted illegal activity, including liquor smuggling. Ten workers were arrested and taken into custody by SIEDO.
  - In the same area of the city, Mario Alberto Garcia Ramirez a.k.a. "El Galleto" presumed leader of a group of hitmen that belonged to Los Zetas was arrested. Four suspects, two assault rifles, three vehicles were also seized.
- March 4, – In the Colonia of Corrijo del Rey, nine members of the Beltrán-Leyva Cartel including 4 state police officers who were collaborating with the cartel were arrested. Assault rifles and ammunition were also seized.
- March 19, – In Monterrey, gunmen inside a three-vehicle convoy fired upon a military convoy which gave chase. The chase ended in Monterrey's Technological campus when one of the hostile vehicles, an armoured GMC Yukon, stopped and its occupants fled to the entrance of a building, where they were shot and killed by army troops. Overall two gunmen were killed and three soldiers were injured by two grenades that were thrown from the other vehicles which escaped, presumably aided by the state police. Army troops also seized 3 assault rifles, and several rifle magazines.
- March 25, – 85 kilometers northeast of Monterrey in the municipality of Cerralvo, Nuevo Leon. Naval helicopters intercepted a large convoy made up various trucks and suspects. The convoy was ordered to stop but responded with ground fire instead. The gunmen clashed with Mexican Marines leaving six gunmen dead. Several rounds of ammunition and weapons were confiscated. Army troops subsequently secured the area.
- April 24, – Mexican troops and gunmen clashed in the municipalities of Benito Juarez and San Nicolás de los Garza. Six gunmen were killed and one was captured. One Mexican soldier was injured. Army air and ground units were mobilized to secure the area. Later that day, Army and State Investigation Agency (AEI) personnel took control of the Municipal Police stations in Benito Juarez and Apodaca to investigate police officers that reportedly aided the gunmen. Five police officers were arrested suspected in aiding the gunmen that attacked army troops earlier.
- The Mexican Army reported that on April 24, acting on an anonymous tip, troops were sent to the municipality of General Bravo, Nuevo León to conduct ground surveillance on a ranch that was manned by armed civilians. Upon arriving, military personnel were met with ground fire from a convoy of 20 vehicles, soldiers returned fire, killing three of the gunmen. In seizing the ranch 4 gunmen were captured. Forty assault rifles, 12 trucks and several thousand rounds of ammunition were also seized. Soldiers also discovered seven hostages alive who were being extorted by a criminal organization to take away their property. The armed group was utilizing the ranch as a base for their operations.
- April 28, – In Sabinas Hidalgo, Nuevo León. Acting on an anonymous tip, Mexican troops onboard three helicopters flew over a farm were, upon arriving, armed civilians opened fire on the helicopters. The airborne troops returned fire killing two gunmen and forcing the rest to disperse to the hills. After seizing the farm house, troops discovered 16 hostages that were chained. Also seized were 17 assault rifles, 10 handguns, 3 submachine guns, 2 grenades, 1 rocket launcher, and dozens of packages of marijuana inside a truck that weight 2 tons. Army officials said that the gunmen belong to the criminal organization of Los Zetas.
- May 4, – In Matamoros, Tamaulipas. After receiving information from Mexican Naval Intelligence, Mexican Marines raided a safe house inside the city. A man was arrested during the raid, presumed to be the armed guard of the safehouse. Eleven hostages were also discovered. From the same Intelligence report, Marines raided another safe house where another six hostages were also found.
  - Monterrey, Nuevo León – Due to a successful Naval air and land surveillance operation, 5 Monterrey police officers were arrested by Marines. One of the five officers declared himself a "Halcon" (Hawk).
- May 6, – Tamaulipas. According to news reports, 1,000 heavily armed Mexican Marines onboard 100 vehicles have been spotted moving into the five municipal border towns of: Ciudad Mier, Guerrero, Miguel Alemán, Camargo, and Gustavo Díaz Ordaz. These municipalities have been a battle ground between The Gulf Cartel and Los Zetas ever since there split from each other.
- June 4, – Mexican marines in an anti-crime organization operation in San Pedro Garza García, Nuevo León, arrested four cartel suspects. One of the cartel suspects is Raúl Amberto Padilla Gómez who the Mexican government says is a financial operative within Los Zetas in San Pedro Garza García.
- June 6, – As a result of intelligence sharing by diverse agencies, Mexican marines arrested two drug cartel suspects in Nuevo Laredo. A 9mm pistol, a briefcase containing US$111,000, a second briefcase containing 18,000 Mexican pesos, and communications equipment were also confiscated from the two suspects.
- June 8, – Juan Alberto González, 60, presumably from Brownsville, Texas was arrested by Marines in Matamoros, Tamaulipas. Naval Infantry personnel spotted the 60-year-old Brownsville man leaving a house and suspiciously running to his vehicle. When marines stopped him and searched his vehicle they found a package of marijuana. After searching the home they also discovered 63 packages of marijuana that weighted 241 kilograms and various communication equipment. The suspect and the seized narcotics were sent to the naval installations in Matamoros.
- June 9, – Mexican Special Forces troops from the 7th Military Zone acting on military intelligence arrested Hector Raul Luna Luna a.k.a. El Tory, who the army says is a Los Zetas leader in Monterrey, Nuevo Leon. Hector Raul is said to be responsible for attacks on the U.S. consulate in Monterrey and the execution of six Mexican army soldiers. Along with Hector Raul Luna, army troops also arrested David Eduardo Fuentes Martinez aka El Chile. Hector Raul Luna admitted that under orders from Sigifredo Najera Talamantes, alias El Canico and who had been arrested in March 2009, he participated in the attacks on the U.S. consulate and the execution of six soldiers due to the crackdown in anti-drug operations by the army. On the same day, Mexican troops made a surprise inspection in a State police barracks to inspect firearms that are used by the state police in Northern Monterrey.
- October 21, – Mexican troops from the 7th Military Zone in the Municipality of Monterry, Nuevo Leon, captured Oscar Manuel Bernal Soriano alias "Spider". Oscar "Spider" Soriano was in charge of a Los Zetas cell in that same municipality, he took charge after his predecessor Juan Francisco Zapata Gallegos aka "El Billy" or "Pelon" was arrested by the army on August 27, 2010. Oscar Soriano was also responsible over the men who killed retired Brigadier General Juan Arturo Esparza Garcia who was the Secretariat of Public Security in the Monterrey Municipality on November 4, 2009. Along with Oscar, 6 accomplices, ammunition, weapons, magazines and two vehicles were also seized.
- October 27, – Acting on a "citizens complaint" that armed men were traveling in a convoy, soldiers from the 7th military zone in the municipality of Santiago, Nuevo León searched for and spotted the convoy. The armed convoy quickly began exchanging gunfire with the Mexican troops. In the end one gunman was killed, and one armoured SUV, various rounds of ammunition and magazines, and one grenade were confiscated.
- October 29, – Troops from the 8th Military Zone patrolling the municipality of San Fernando, Tamaulipas, were acting on a "citizens complaint" about strange activity coming from a home. When soldiers arrived they were met with gunfire. The soldiers repelled enemy gunfire. After securing the area soldiers discovered and fred five kidnapped civilians. In the end three gunmen were killed, and two vehicles, including an armoured vehicle, various weapons, ammunition and magazines were seized.
- November 5, – Antonio Ezequiel Cárdenas Guillen, co-leader of the Gulf Cartel, was shot and killed during a gunbattle against Mexican authorities, along with more than 50 of his gunmen, in the border city of Matamoros, Tamaulipas. Although not confirmed, some local sources reveal that more than 100 people died that day in Matamoros.
- November 11, – Mexican troops arrived at the Municipality of Ciudad Mier to protect the families that reside in the town that have been affected by turf war violence. Soldiers have also reinforced shelters in municipality of Miguel Aleman that house residents that left Ciudad Mier.

== 2012 ==
September 12, 2012 Mexican Navy captured Jorge Eduardo Costilla Sánchez in Tampico, Tamaulipas.Video; Confirman captura de "El Coss", líder del cártel del Golfo - El Blog del Narco | Mundonarco.com | Sin censura
