= Sinaloa Cartel–Gulf Cartel conflict =

Armed conflict between 2 Mexican cartels

- Part of the Mexican drug war (from 2006 to 2010)
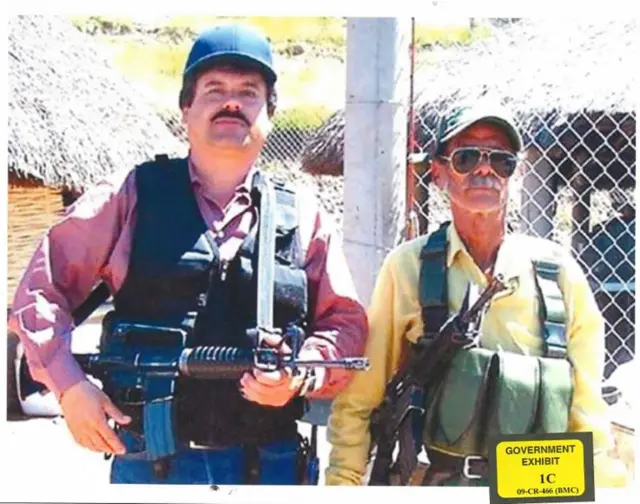
- El Chapo in his hometown of La Tuna, Badiraguato, 2000s
Date	1 August 2003–8 February 2010
Location	Mexico, Guatemala, and Honduras
Status	Partial Gulf Cartel’s victory: Gulf Cartel ousted Sinaloa Cartel from Nuevo Laredo by 2007; Los Zetas’ split from Gulf Cartel; Gulf Cartel-Sinaloa Cartel-La Familia Coalition against Los Zetas

Belligerents
Gulf cartel: Los Zetas	Sinaloa cartel: Los Negros; La Familia Michoacana

Commanders and leaders
Antonio Cárdenas Guillén; Jorge Eduardo Costilla Sánchez; Heriberto Lazcano Lazcano	Joaquín "El Chapo" Guzmán; Ismael Zambada García; Carlos Rosales Mendoza

Casualties and losses
Unknown	Unknown
- In total 5,100+ killed, +400 of whom in Nuevo Laredo

The Sinaloa Cartel–Gulf Cartel conflict, or Battle for Nuevo Laredo, was an armed conflict between the two Mexican cartels for the control of the drug trade of the border town of Nuevo Laredo.

== Background ==
After the fall of the Guadalajara Cartel, dozens of Gallardo’s allies started their own relations with southamerican cartels. During this era, new drug kingpins and cartels emerged, such as the Tijuana Cartel, the Juarez Cartel, the Gulf Cartel, and the Sinaloa Cartel. The latter cartel was led by Joaquín "El Chapo" Guzmán and Ismael "El Mayo" Zambada, among the most powerful drug traffickers in Mexican history.

=== Corruption with the cartels ===
In the 1990s, the cartels cooperated with the PAN to crack down on rackets and snatch votes from the PRI. Indeed, in 1994, a presidential candidate and PRI's secretary general was assassinated. Furthermore, in 1995, President Carlos Salinas's brother, also a PRI member, was arrested for murder and corruption. In this climate of corruption and political violence, the PAN won the 2000 elections with Vicente Fox. Supported by the PAN, the cartels were able to focus on drugs and commission assassinations from external armed groups, such as the Zetas, former Mexican special forces soldiers who became hitmen for the Gulf Cartel.

=== The dispute over Nuevo Laredo’s border ===
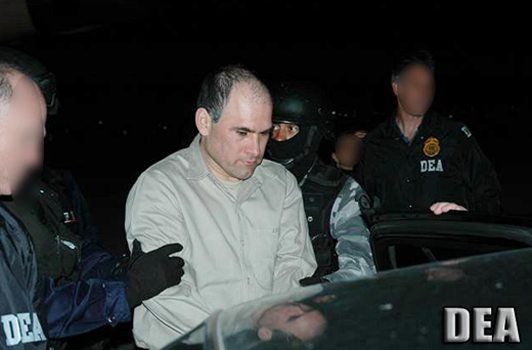
Osiel Cárdenas' extradition to the United States from Mexico.

The tension between Sinaloa Cartel and Gulf Cartel started in 2003 with the arrest of Osiel Cardenas Guillen, altering the previous balance of power between the cartels. The Sinaloa Cartel also started challenging Gulf Cartel’s dominance of the city of Nuevo Laredo for its important drug smuggling route into the United States with their own militia: Los Negros. According to the DEA, half of the cocaine arriving in the United States was trafficked through Nuevo Laredo during the 2000s.

== The conflict ==
With an agreement between the Sinaloa cartel and the Mexican authorities, the Mexican Army managed to arrest Osiel Cárdenas Guillén. Following the 2003 arrest of Cárdenas, it is believed the Sinaloa Cartel moved 200 men into the region to battle the Gulf Cartel for control. The Nuevo Laredo region is an important drug trafficking corridor as 40% of all Mexican exports, a total of 9,000 trucks, pass through the region into the United States. The war started on 1 August 2003 when the Federal Investigations Agency (AFI) confronted a group of armed men of Los Negros, the Sinaloa Cartel’s armed wing, in the streets of Nuevo Laredo during a clash between them and the Gulf Cartel’s armed wing Los Zetas, killing three narcos. The armed confrontation lasted for more than 40 minutes, provoking "panic" and turning Nuevo Laredo into a "battlefield." The gunshots were heard throughout most of the city, creating "tension" among the population. Some witnesses, who preferred to remain anonymous, claimed that they saw over "18 armed men in black with ski-masks." Rocket-launchers, along with an "inexact number of assault rifles," were reportedly used in the attack. Following the 2004 assassination of journalist Roberto Javier Mora García from El Mañana newspaper, much of the local media was silenced over the fighting. The cartels intimidated the media and sometimes use it to send messages to the general population. After the latter ordered El Chapo's brother killed in 2004. The killing set off a chain of reprisals and led to an escalation of the violence between the two groups in 2005.

On October 10, 2004, in Nuevo Laredo, Tamaulipas state, the bodies of five executed men were found in a house with two messages: "Send us more idiots to kill" and "This is for you, Chapo Guzmán". In 2005, the homicide rate tripled in Nuevo Laredo, and President Fox sent thousands of police forces to calm the situation, causing a violent reaction of the cartels. By 2005, the Mexican government flooded Nuevo Laredo with extra law enforcement personnel. On June 8, 2005, Alejandro Domínguez Coello, chief of police of Nuevo Laredo (first ever day as a chief), was killed during a battle between the two cartels; in the aftermath the military and police took over the city, resulting in 50 deaths. Los Zetas turf conflict also instilled terror against journalists and civilians of Nuevo Laredo. This set a new precedent, which cartels later mimicked. It is estimated that in the first eight months of 2005, about 110 people died in Nuevo Laredo, Tamaulipas, as a result of the fighting between the Gulf and Sinaloa cartels. The same year, there was another surge in violence in the state of Michoacán as La Familia Michoacana drug cartel established itself after splintering from its former allies, the Gulf Cartel and Los Zetas.

=== After the Mexican Drug War ===
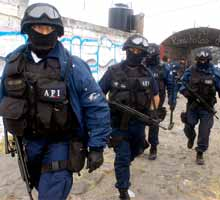
Mexican Federal Security Forces during the operation in Michoacán, February 2007.

Following the 2006 presidential election, Felipe Calderón initiated Operation Michoacán, a militarized campaign against drug cartels as an effort to consolidate political authority, strengthen the legitimacy of his administration, and rally public support. In 2007 the Joint Operation Nuevo León-Tamaulipas started to stop Gulf Cartel’s influence and violence in the State. On April 12, 2007, for the first time in the state of Nuevo León, army soldiers confronted cartel gunmen while searching houses in the municipality of Marín. One gunman was reported killed and two were arrested.

Eventually by 2007, Nuevo Laredo's peace reassumed after the Gulf Cartel ousted the Sinaloa Cartel, and after the law enforcement presence made it harder for them to operate in the city without being disrupted. Although organized crime continued in Nuevo Laredo, it had mainly "gone underground".

==== Ceasefire after Los Zetas split from Gulf Cartel ====
Los Zetas became so powerful that they outnumbered and outclassed the Gulf Cartel in revenue, membership, and influence by 2010. As a result of this imbalance, the Cartel tried to curtail their own enforcers' influence and ended up instigating a civil war. When the hostilities began, the Cartel joined forces with its former rivals, the Sinaloa Cartel and La Familia Michoacana, aiming to take out Los Zetas.

=== Minor clashes (2019-present) ===
The Gulf Cartel started to attack Sinaloa Cartel again after an alliance with the Jalisco New Generation Cartel in 2019.

== See also ==
- Mexican drug war
- Juárez Cartel
- Tijuana Cartel
