= Juan García Abrego =

Mexican convicted drug lord

FBI Ten Most Wanted Fugitive
- Charges: 22 counts of drug trafficking

Description
- Born: September 13, 1944 (age 82): Matamoros, Tamaulipas, Mexico; or La Paloma, Texas, U.S.

Status
- Penalty: Life in prison
- Status: Imprisoned at ADX Florence
- Added: March 9, 1995
- Caught: January 14, 1996
- Number: 440
- Captured

Juan García Abrego (Spanish pronunciation: [xwɑŋ ɡaɾˈsia ˈaβɾeɣo]; born September 13, 1944) is a Mexican convicted drug lord and former top leader of the Gulf Cartel, a criminal group based in the state of Tamaulipas, Mexico. He started in the cartel under the tutelage of his uncle Juan Nepomuceno Guerra.

== Criminal career ==
Reports date his trafficking career beginning in the mid-1970s, exporting marijuana from Mexico into the U.S. states of Texas, Louisiana and Florida. In the early 1980s he began incorporating cocaine into the cartel's trafficking operations. United States intelligence reports state Guerra reared his nephew on car theft before passing down his criminal enterprise. García Abrego was involved in car theft activities since the 1970s along with his best friend Líctor Hazael Marroquín García. The exact date of succession is unknown; however, law enforcement officials recall an incident on January 27, 1987, when Tomás Morlet, former officer in an elite Mexican police force turned national trafficker, exchanged harsh words with García Abrego and was later found, shot twice in the back in the doorway of Guerra's Piedras Negras Restaurant.

García Abrego is widely known for innovating Mexican trafficking operations, turning them from smugglers into suppliers. By renegotiating deals with the Cali Cartel, García Abrego was able to secure 50% of every shipment out of Colombia as payment for delivery, instead of the US$1,500 per kilo they were previously receiving. The renegotiating, however, brought a price: the cartel would have to guarantee any shipment from Colombia to its destination. This change forced García Abrego to begin stockpiling hundreds of tons of cocaine along Mexico's northern border in warehouses; however, this allowed him to set up his own distribution network and expand his political influence. By the end of the 1980s and into the early 1990s, it was estimated García Abrego was smuggling over 300 metric tons per year across the Mexico–United States border.

Once the cocaine crossed the border into the United States it was believed to reach distribution networks across the country in cities such as San Antonio, Houston and New York City, with smaller elements in Dallas, Chicago, New Orleans, Oklahoma City, California and Arizona.

The cartel's United States distribution network relied heavily on regional managers. Operating from Houston, Texas, high-ranking regional lieutenant Hilario Gonzalez Balderas Sr. served as a primary U.S. distribution operator, managed cocaine logistics, and laundered proceeds for the organization until his federal conviction in 1992. He was prosecuted in the U.S. District Court for the Northern District of Texas for engaging in a Continuing Criminal Enterprise (CCE) and conspiracy to transport monetary instruments, which resulted in a mandatory federal life sentence without parole.

In addition to transporting cocaine for the Cali Cartel, it was believed the García Abrego cartel would also ship large quantities of cash to be laundered. The United States Department of Justice would confiscate over US$53 million between 1989 and 1993 that was being laundered through two corrupt American Express employees as proof of such large scale operations. In 1994, the United States Drug Enforcement Administration (DEA) believed García Abrego was making as much as US$10 billion per year in profit. The following years Fortune Magazine estimated the García Abrego empire to be worth US$15 billion.

García Abrego was also involved in providing protection to other cartels wishing to operate within corridors already claimed by his organization. In the mid-1980s, Carlos Reséndez set up a meeting between García Abrego and Gernando "El Aguacate" Martínez, regarding permission for Martínez to move cocaine through Matamoros. García Abrego permitted him to do so in exchange for US$200k per airplane flying through the region.

It was later revealed to García Abrego that Martínez began moving planes through the region without paying the fee. García Abrego reached out to an FBI agent, Claudio de la O., whom he was bribing, to have the men taken care of. Claudio de la O. alluded to having the men killed, however they were taken into custody.

=== Corruption in Mexico ===
Juan García Abrego's web of corruption was believed to stretch to all aspects of the Ernesto Zedillo government. Upon García Abrego's arrest a book detailing the scale of bribery was located. From examining the contents it became known that the head of Federal Judicial Police (FJP) was receiving US$1 million, force operations chief was receiving US$500,000 and the federal police commander of the Gulf Cartels base of operations in Matamoros, was receiving US$100,000.

The book categorized the payments not so much as bribes but rather as what García Abrego considered a tax on business. In an article published in the Mexican daily El Financiero it was alleged García Abrego had infiltrated 95% of the Attorney General's Office. It would later be revealed that a commander in the Attorney General of Mexico (PGR), López Parra, was receiving US$1.5 million per month in bribes; López Parra was the head of northern Mexico.

=== Corruption in the United States ===
García Abrego's ties extended beyond the Mexican government and into the United States. With the arrest of one of García Abrego's traffickers, Juan Antonio Ortiz, it became known the cartel would ship tons of cocaine in United States Immigration and Naturalization Service (INS) buses between the years of 1986 to 1990. The buses made great transportation, as Antonio Ortiz noted, since they were never stopped at the border.

It also became known that, in addition to the INS bus scam, García Abrego had a "special deal" with members of the Texas National Guard who would truck tons of cocaine and marijuana from South Texas to Houston for the cartel.

García Abrego's reach became known when a United States Federal Bureau of Investigation (FBI) agent named Claude de la O., in 1986, stated in testimony against García Abrego that he received over US$100,000 in bribes and had leaked information that could have endangered an FBI informant as well as Mexican journalists. In 1989, Claude was removed from the case for unknown reasons, retiring a year later. García Abrego bribed the agent in an attempt to gather more information on U.S. law enforcement operations.

García Abrego's arrest was even subject to allegations of corruption. It is believed the Mexican government knew all García Abrego's whereabouts all along and had refused to arrest him due to information he possessed about the extent of corruption within the government. The arresting officer, an FJP commander, is believed to have received a bulletproof Mercury Grand Marquis and US$500,000 from a rival cartel for enacting García Abrego's arrest.

Further theories allege that García Abrego was arrested to satisfy U.S. demands and meet certification, from the Department of Justice (DOJ), as a trade partner. García Abrego was apprehended on January 14, 1996, and Mexico received certification on March 1.

=== Enforcement ===
It is believed that on May 16, 1984, García Abrego ordered a hit on rival trafficker Casimiro Espinosa. The murder attempt failed, leaving Casimiro injured. The following day gunmen shot their way into Raya Clinic, a private hospital, looking for Casimiro. In the ten-minute shootout that followed, 300 rounds were fired and multiple innocent people were killed, including a security guard, a husband and child, and a bedridden woman. Casimiro died the next day from injuries sustained in the shootout.

Two years after the 1984 clinic shootout, Ernesto Flores, an editor for the Mexican daily newspaper El Popular, was executed. It is believed García Abrego ordered the hit after being aggravated with their coverage of the cartel's deeds. Flores car was sprayed with gunfire by gunmen waiting at the entrance to the newspaper's offices. Norma Morena, a reporter for the newspaper, was also killed in the attack.

In 1991, a principal member of the Gulf Cartel, Tomás "Gringo" Sánchez, ordered the killing of a Colombian drug trafficker in a prison in Matamoros. The killing was not authorized by García Abrego, and a riot subsequently broke out, killing two members of the Gulf Cartel who were also incarcerated there. García Abrego, furious with the media attention that followed the riot, ordered the killing of Sánchez for overstepping his authority and bringing unwanted attention to the cartel.

=== Arrest ===
Juan García Abrego had gained such notoriety that he was placed on the FBI Top Ten Most Wanted List of 1995. He has the distinction of being the first drug trafficker to ever be placed on that list. He was arrested on a ranch outside of Monterrey on January 14, 1996.

He was quickly extradited to the United States, where he stood trial eight months after his arrest. García Abrego was convicted on 22 counts including money laundering, drug trafficking, intent to distribute and running an ongoing criminal enterprise. After a four-week trial, a jury needed only 12 hours to convict García Abrego on all charges. He was sentenced by presiding judge Ewing Werlein, Jr., to 11 consecutive life terms, and is currently incarcerated at ADX Florence ADX Florence in Fremont County, Colorado

In addition to the prison sentencing, García Abrego was forced to turn over millions in illegal proceeds. The United States Government requested US$1.05 billion but the jury, after an hour of deliberation, agreed to only US$350 million. García Abrego's lawyer, Mr. Canales, stated it was "a symbolic grab at nothing" since García Abrego did not reside in the United States or have any assets in the country.

Prior to García Abrego's arrest he had been discussing terms in which he would surrender to authorities. Those terms included medical treatment for his jailed brother's diabetes, one last trip to Colombia before his surrender, conjugal visits from his mistress, to be jailed in Guadalajara with some of his lieutenants for his own protection, and to allow himself to be taken in by the police commander of his choice. Mexican government officials however denied the requests.

Following the arrest of García Abrego, Osiel Cárdenas Guillen took over the cartel. Cárdenas was known for founding the para-military group Los Zetas as enforcers for the Gulf Cartel. Cárdenas was captured by the Mexican Army after a battle on March 14, 2003, in Matamoros.

In February 2010, Los Zetas engaged in a violent turf war against its former employer/partner, the Gulf Cartel, in the border city of Reynosa.

== Media portrayals ==
In Narcos: Mexico, García Abrego is portrayed by Flavio Medina.

== See also ==
- Guadalajara Cartel
- Los Zetas
