= Juan Nepomuceno Guerra =

Mexican drug trafficker

- Nepomuceno Guerra pictured on far left
- Born: Juan Nepomuceno Guerra Cárdenas; July 18, 1915; Matamoros, Tamaulipas, Mexico
- Died: July 12, 2001 (aged 85); Matamoros, Tamaulipas, Mexico
- Other names: Don Juan; El Padrino; El Padrino de Matamoros
- Occupations: Gulf Cartel leader and founder
- Relatives: Juan García Abrego (nephew)

Juan Nepomuceno Guerra Cárdenas (July 18, 1915 – July 12, 2001) was a Mexican drug lord who founded and led the Gulf Cartel for over 50 years. He is often considered the "godfather" of U.S–Mexico border cartels.

He began his criminal career in the 1930s by smuggling alcohol from Mexico during the Prohibition in the United States. He later diversified to other cross-border smuggling activities. He is the uncle of Juan García Ábrego, his successor in the cartel and once considered Mexico's most-wanted man.

== Early life and career ==
During the 1930s he began smuggling whisky across the Mexico–United States border through south Texas. Through shrewd political connections he had fostered, Nepomuceno Guerra was able to control all the contraband moving across the Rio Grande. In the 1970s, his nephew Juan García Abrego began utilizing those connections and developed the organization into a drug cartel primarily dedicated to the more lucrative business of smuggling cocaine.

According to news sources, despite allegedly founding one of the largest drug cartels in Mexico, Juan Nepomuceno Guerra never spent more than "a few hours in jail" for his crimes.

He died of respiratory disease.

== Legacy ==
On June 18, 2015, the Governor of Tamaulipas Egidio Torre Cantú inaugurated a street under his name, "Juan N. Guerra", in Reynosa, Tamaulipas. The street was inaugurated along with seven others and is located in the working-class neighborhood Reserva Territorial Campestre.

== In popular culture ==
In Narcos: Mexico, Juan Nepomuceno Guerra is played by the Mexican actor Jesus Ochoa.

== See also ==
- Mexican drug war
