= Mexican Army =

Mexican Armed Forces land and air branches

- Ejército Mexicano
- Mexican Army emblem
- Founded: February 19, 1913; 113 years ago
- Country: Mexico
- Type: Army and air force
- Role: National defense
- Size: 275,443 (2025)
- Part of: Mexican Armed Forces; Secretariat of National Defense
- Motto: Siempre Leales (Always Loyal)
- Colors: red
- Mascot: Golden eagle
- Anniversaries: 19 February, Day of the Army. 13 September, Día de los Niños Héroes.
- Equipment: See: Equipment
- Engagements: See list: Mexican War of Independence Anexation of Central America; Salvadoran-Mexican War Casa Mata Plan Revolution Spanish attempts to reconquer Mexico Texas Revolution First Franco-Mexican War Rebellion of Rio Grande Invasion of Yucatán Texas-Mexico Conflicts; Texan Santa Fe Expedition; Adrián Woll's Expedition into Texas; Mier Expedition; Texas Raids on New Mexico Anexation of Soconusco Capture of Monterrey Mexican-American War Caste War of Yucatán Fillibustering in Mexico; Gaston de Rousset's Expeditions to Sonora; William Walker's Expedition to Baja California; Battle of Caborca Revolution of Ayutla Reform War Second Franco-Mexican War Lerdista Uprising Mexican Revolution Border War La Cristiada World War II; Philippines Campaign Dirty War Zapatista Uprising Mexican Drug War

Commanders
- Commander-in-chief: President Claudia Sheinbaum
- Secretary of National Defense: General Ricardo Trevilla Trejo
- Commander of the Army: General Celestino Ávila Astudillo

Insignia
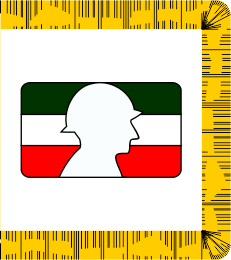
- Guidon

The Mexican Army (Spanish: Ejército Mexicano) is the combined land and air branch of the Mexican Armed Forces. It includes the Mexican Air Force, the Special Forces Body, and the National Guard. The institution also has entrepreneurial state-run military industrial and corporate business branches' activities.

With an active-duty force of 261,773 servicemembers (as of 2024), the Army is the largest component of the Mexican Armed Forces. It is under the authority of the Secretariat of National Defense (Spanish: Secretaría de la Defensa Nacional, SEDENA) and is headed by the Secretary of National Defence, who is directly answerable to the President.

== History ==
=== Antecedents ===
==== Pre-Columbian ====
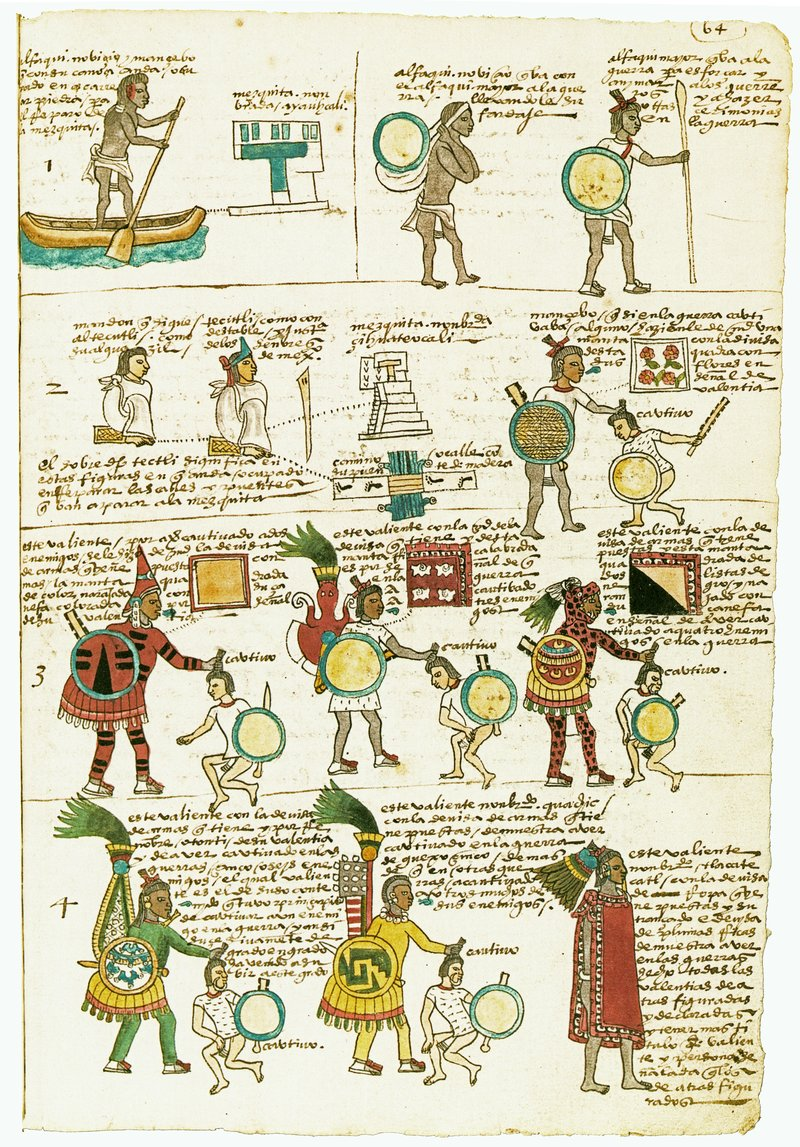
This page from the Codex Mendoza shows the gradual improvements to equipment and tlahuiztli as a warrior progresses through the ranks.

In the prehispanic era, there were many indigenous tribes and highly developed city-states in what is now known as central Mexico. The most advanced and powerful kingdoms were those of Tenochtitlan, Texcoco and Tlacopan, which comprised populations of the same ethnic origin and were politically linked by an alliance known as the Triple Alliance; colloquially these three states are known as the Aztec. They had a center for higher education called the Calmecac in Nahuatl, this was where the children of the Aztec priesthood and nobility receive rigorous religious and military training and conveyed the highest knowledge such as: doctrines, divine songs, the science of interpreting codices, calendar skills, memorization of texts, etc. In Aztec society, it was compulsory for all young males, nobles as well as commoners, to join part of the armed forces at the age of 15. Recruited by regional and clan groups (calpulli) the conscripts were organized in units of about 8,000 men (Xiquipilli). These were broken down into 400 strong sub-units. Aztec nobility (some of whom were the children of commoners who had distinguished themselves in battle) led their own serfs on campaign.

Itzcoatl "Obsidian Serpent" (1381–1440), fourth king of Tenochtitlán, organized the army that defeated the Tepanec of Azcapotzalco, freeing his people from their dominion. His reign began with the rise of what would become the largest empire in Mesoamerica. Then Moctezuma Ilhuicamina "The arrow to the sky" (1440–1469) came to extend the domain and the influence of the monarchy of Tenochtitlán. He began to organize trade to the outside regions of the Valley of Mexico. This was the Mexica ruler who organized the alliance with the lordships of Texcoco and Tlacopan to form the Triple Alliance.

The Aztec established the Flower Wars as a form of worship; these, unlike the wars of conquest, were aimed at obtaining prisoners for sacrifice to the sun. Combat orders were given by kings (or Lords) using drums or blowing into a sea snail shell that gave off a sound like a horn. Giving out signals using coats of arms was very common. For combat outside of cities, they would organize several groups, only one of which would be involved in action, while the others remained on the alert. When attacking enemy cities, they usually divided their forces into three equal-sized wings, which simultaneously assaulted different parts of the defences – this enabled the leaders to determine which division of warriors had distinguished themselves the most in combat.

==== Military in the Spanish colonial era ====
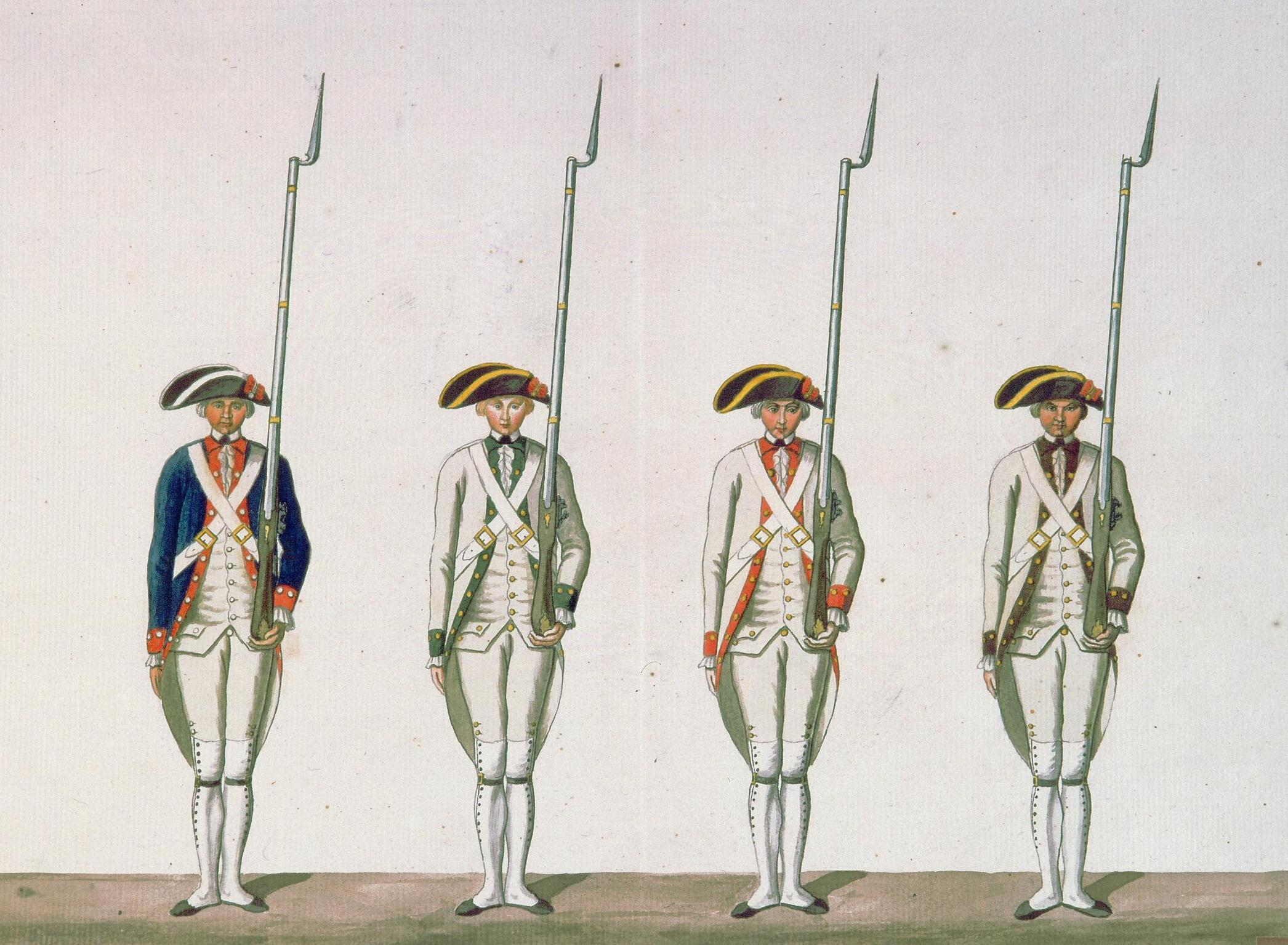
Uniforms of four line infantry regiments raised in New Spain under the Bourbon Reforms in 1788

During the 18th century the Spanish colonial forces in the greater Mexico region consisted of regular "Peninsular" regiments sent from Spain itself, augmented by locally recruited provincial and urban militia units of infantry, cavalry and artillery. A few regular infantry and dragoon regiments (e.g. the Regimiento de Mexico) were recruited within Mexico and permanently stationed there. Mounted units of soldados de cuera (so called from the leather protective clothing that they wore) patrolled frontier and desert regions.

=== Independence ===
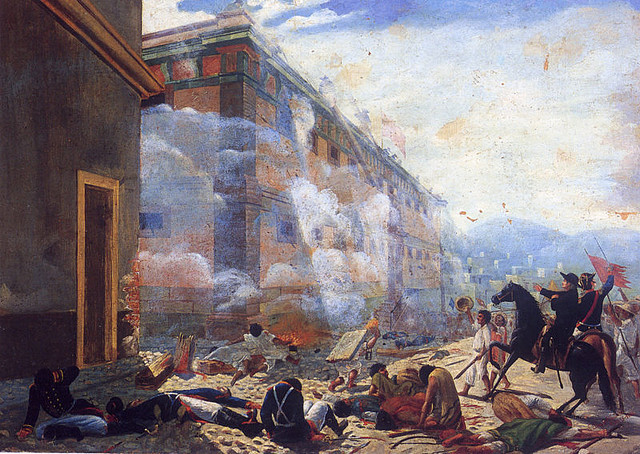
1910 painting of the capture of Alhóndiga de Granaditas

In the early morning of 16 September 1810, the Army of Miguel Hidalgo y Costilla initiated the independence movement. Hidalgo was followed by his loyal companions, among them Mariano Abasolo, and a small army equipped with swords, spears, slingshots and sticks. Captain General Ignacio Allende was the military brains of the insurgent army in the first phase of the War of Independence and secured several victories over the Spanish Royal Army. Their troops were about 5,000 strong and were later joined by squadrons of the Queen's Regiment where its members in turn contributed infantry battalions and cavalry squadrons to the insurrection cause.

The Spaniards saw that it was important to defend the Alhóndiga de Granaditas public granary in Guanajuato, which maintained the flow of water, weapons, food and ammunition to the Spanish Royal Army. The insurgents entered Guanajuato and proceeded to lay siege to the Alhóndiga. The insurgents suffered heavy casualties until Juan Jose de los Reyes, the Pípila, fitted a slab of rock on his back to protect himself from enemy fire and crawled to the large wooden door of the Alhóndiga with a torch in hand to set it on fire. With this stunt, the insurgents managed to bring down the door and enter the building and overrun it. Hidalgo headed to Valladolid (now Morelia), which was captured with little opposition. While the Insurgent Army was, by then, over 60,000 strong, it was mostly formed of poorly armed men with arrows, sticks and tillage tools – it had a few guns, which had been taken from Spanish stocks.

In Aculco, the Royal Spanish forces under the command of Felix Maria Calleja, Count of Calderón, and Don Manuel de Flon (and comprising 200 infantrymen, 500 cavalry and 12 cannons) defeated the insurgents, who lost many men as well as the artillery they had obtained at Battle of Monte de las Cruces. On 29 November 1810, Hidalgo entered Guadalajara, the capital of Nueva Galicia, where he organized his government and the Insurgent Army; he also issued a decree abolishing slavery. At Calderon Bridge (Puente de Calderón) near the city of Guadalajara, insurgents held a hard-fought battle with the royalists. During the fierce fighting, one of the insurgents' ammunition wagons exploded, which led to their defeat. The insurgents lost all their artillery, much of their equipment and the lives of many men.

At the Wells of Baján (Norias de Baján) near Monclova, Coahuila, a former royalist named Ignacio Elizondo, who had joined the insurgent cause, betrayed them and seized Miguel Hidalgo y Costilla, Ignacio Allende, Juan Aldama, José Mariano Jiménez and the rest of the entourage. They were brought to the city of Chihuahua where they were tried by a military court and executed by firing squad on 30 July 1811. Hidalgo's death resulted in a political vacuum for the insurgents until 1812. Meanwhile, the royalist military commander, General Félix María Calleja, continued to pursue rebel troops. The fighting evolved into guerrilla warfare.

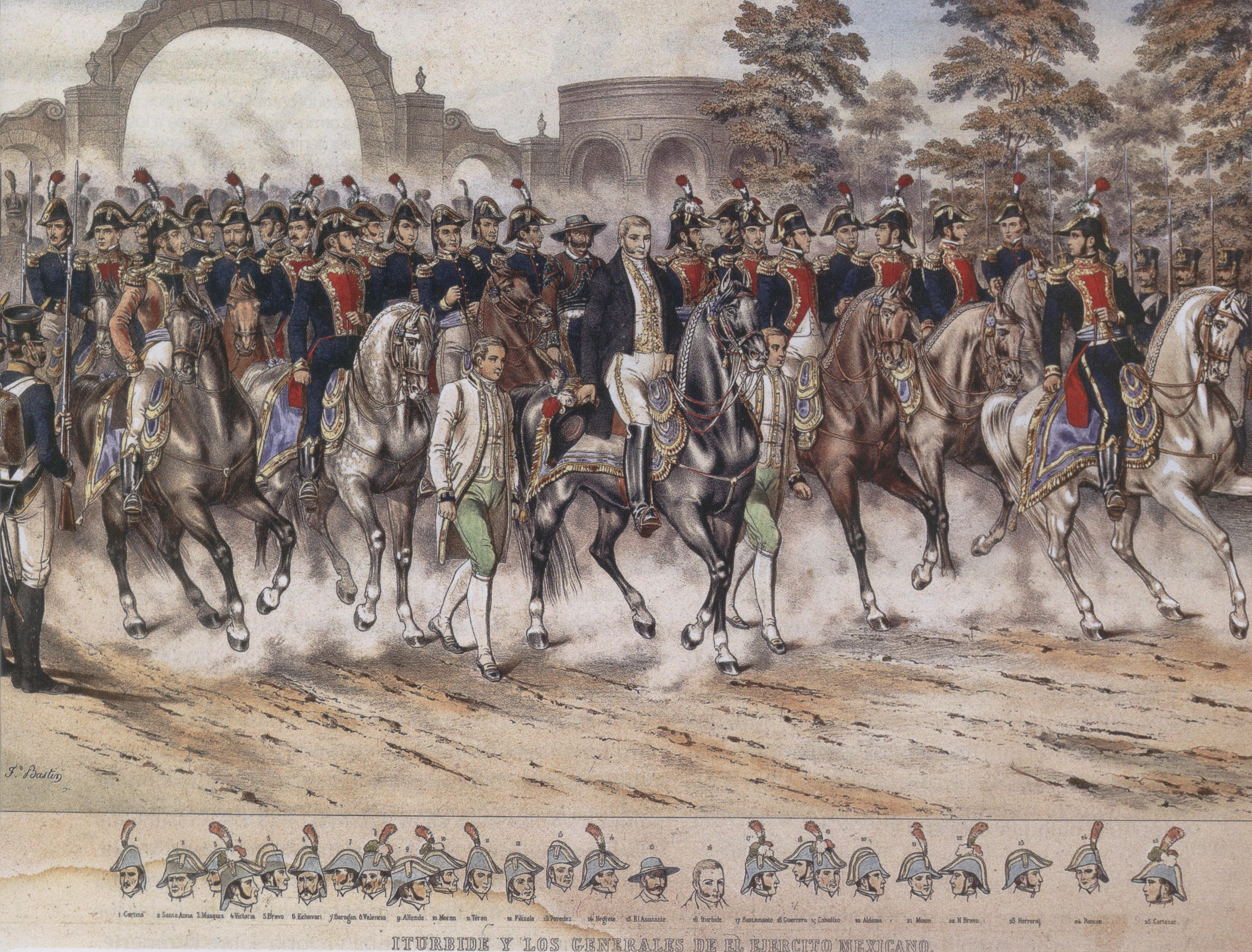
1842 illustration of the Army of the Three Guarantees entering Mexico City in September 1821

The next major rebel leader was the priest José María Morelos y Pavón, who had formerly led the insurgent movement alongside Hidalgo. Morelos fortified the port of Acapulco and took the city of Chilpancingo. Along the way, Morelos, was joined by Leonardo Bravo, his son Nicholas and his brothers Max, Victor and Miguel Bravo. Morelos conducted several campaigns in the south, managing to conquer much of the region as he gave orders to the insurgents to promote the writing of the first constitution for the new Mexican nation: the Constitution of Apatzingán, which was drafted in 1814. In 1815, Morelos was apprehended and executed by firing squad. His death concluded the second phase of the Mexican War for Independence.

From 1815 to 1820, the independence movement became sluggish; it was briefly reinvigorated by Francisco Javier Mina and Pedro Moreno, who were both quickly apprehended and executed. It was not until late 1820, when Agustín de Iturbide, one of the most bloodthirsty enemies of the insurgents, established relations with Vicente Guerrero and Guadalupe Victoria, two of the rebel leaders. Guerrero and Victoria supported Iturbide's plan for Mexican independence, El Plan de Iguala and Iturbide was appointed commander of the Ejército Trigarante, or The Army of the Three Guarantees. With this new alliance, they were able to enter Mexico City on 27 September 1821, which concluded the Mexican War for Independence.

=== Pastry War ===
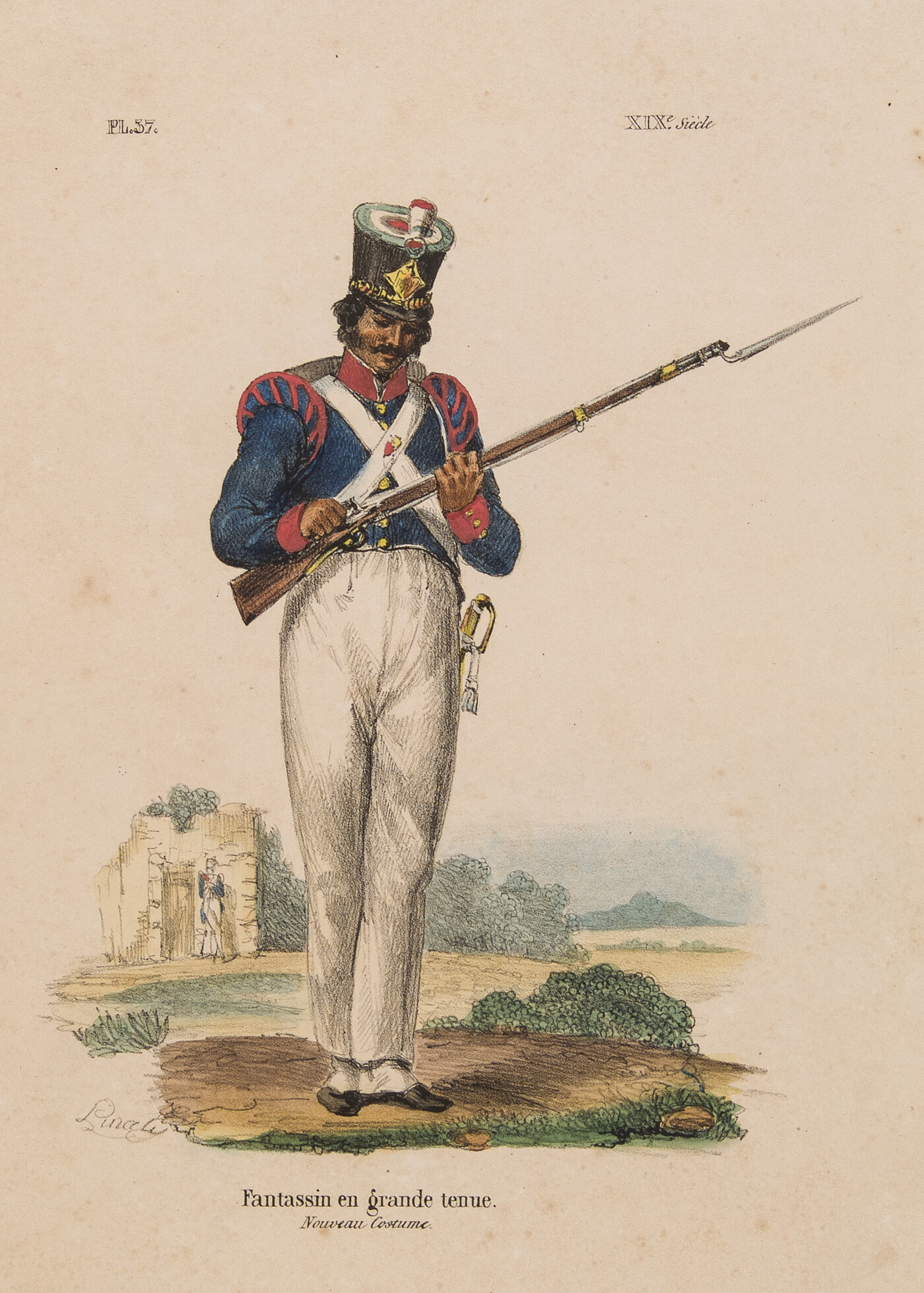
1828 illustration of a Mexican soldier in full dress uniform

The Pastry War was the first French intervention in Mexico. Following the widespread civil disorder that plagued the early years of the Mexican republic, fighting in the streets destroyed a great deal of personal property. Foreigners whose property was damaged or destroyed by rioters or bandits were usually unable to obtain compensation from the government, and began to appeal to their own governments for help.

In 1838, a French pastry cook, Monsieur Remontel, claimed that his shop in the Tacubaya district of Mexico City had been ruined in 1828 by looting Mexican officers. He appealed to France's King Louis-Philippe (1773–1850). Coming to its citizen's aid, France demanded 600,000 pesos in damages. This amount was extremely high when compared to an average workman's daily pay, which was about one peso. In addition to this amount, Mexico had defaulted on millions of dollars' worth of loans from France. Diplomat Baron Deffaudis gave Mexico an ultimatum to pay, or the French would demand satisfaction. When the payment was not forthcoming from president Anastasio Bustamante (1780–1853), the king sent a fleet under Rear Admiral Charles Baudin to declare a blockade of all Mexican ports from Yucatán to the Rio Grande, to bombard the Mexican fortress of San Juan de Ulúa, and to seize the port of Veracruz. Virtually the entire Mexican Navy was captured at Veracruz by December 1838. Mexico declared war on France.

With trade cut off, the Mexicans began smuggling imports into Corpus Christi, Texas, and then into Mexico. Fearing that France would blockade Texan ports as well, a battalion of men of the Republic of Texas force began patrolling Corpus Christi Bay to stop Mexican smugglers. One smuggling party abandoned their cargo of about a hundred barrels of flour on the beach at the mouth of the bay, thus giving Flour Bluff its name. The United States, ever watchful of its relations with Mexico, sent the schooner Woodbury to help the French in their blockade. Talks between the French Kingdom and the Texan nation occurred and France agreed not to offend the soil or waters of the Republic of Texas. With the diplomatic intervention of the United Kingdom, eventually President Bustamante promised to pay the 600,000 pesos and the French forces withdrew on 9 March 1839.

=== Mexican–American War ===
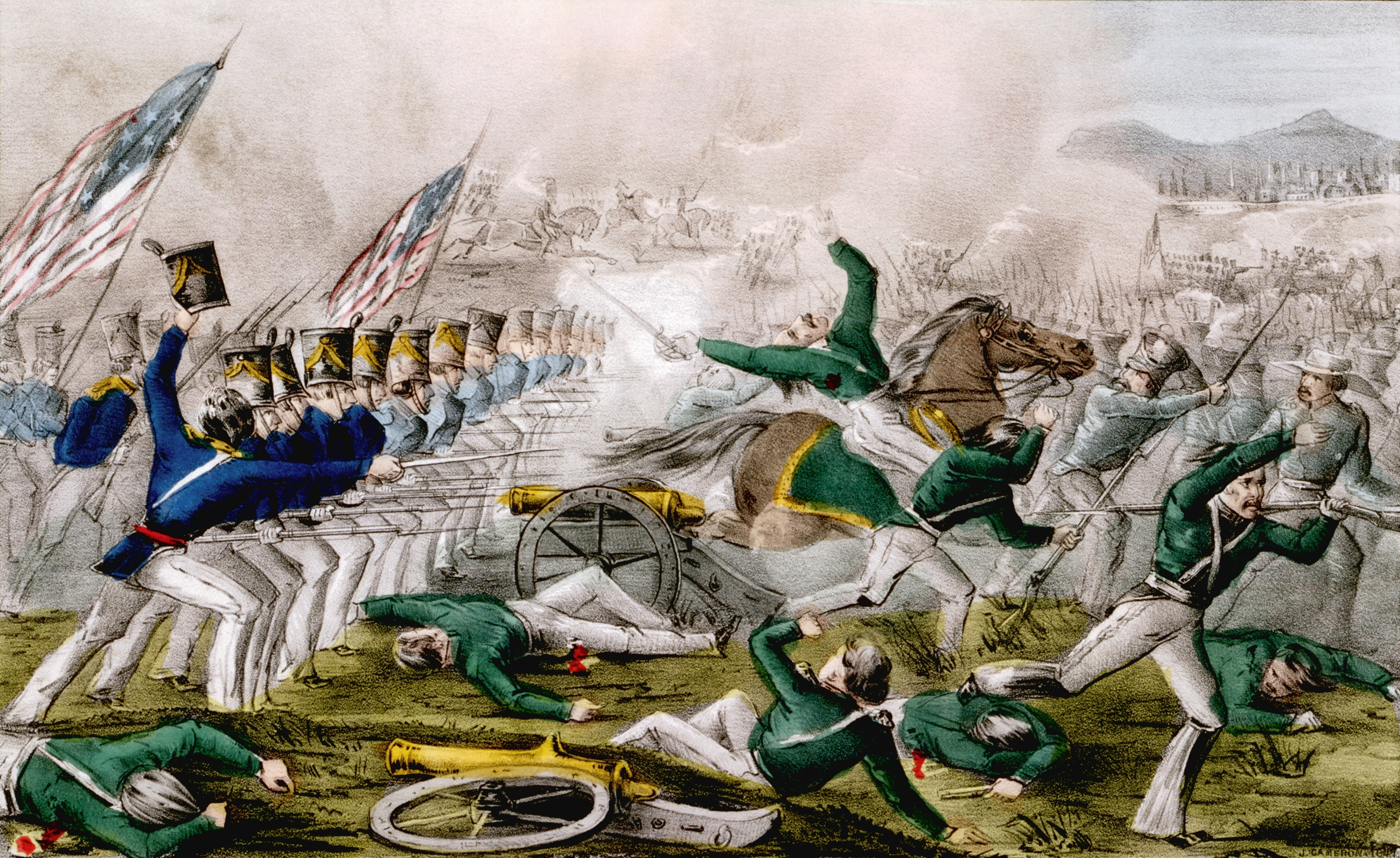
Engraving of Mexican soldiers (right) at the Battle of Churubusco

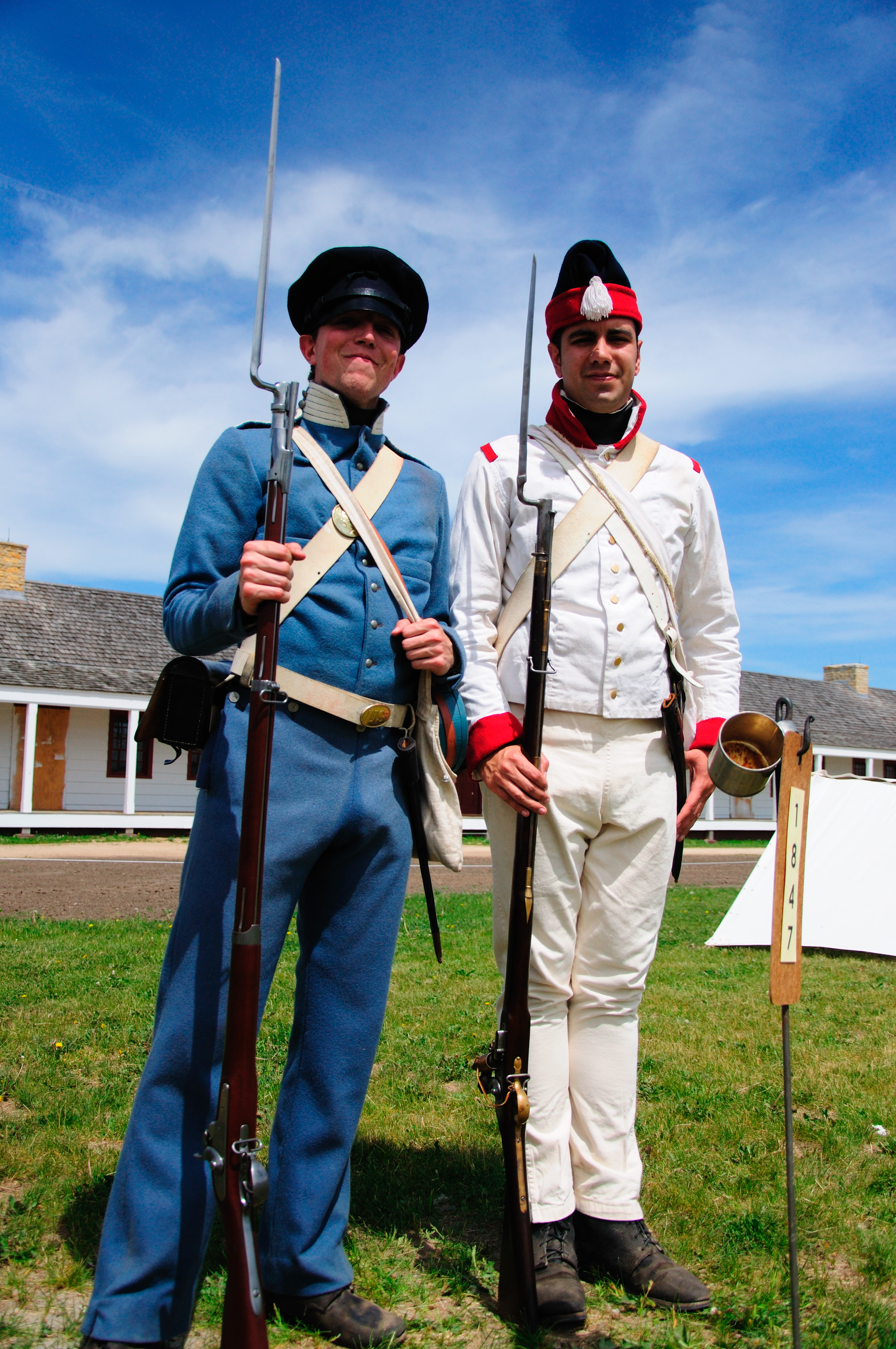
Re-enactors portraying American and Mexican soldiers of the conflict

U.S. territorial expansion under Manifest Destiny in the 19th century had reached the banks of the Rio Grande, which prompted Mexican president José Joaquín de Herrera to form an army of 6,000 men to defend the Mexican northern frontier from the expansion of the neighboring country. In 1845, Texas, a former Mexican territory that had broken away from Mexico by rebellion, was annexed into the United States. In response to this, the minister of Mexico in the U.S., Juan N. Almonte called for his Letters of Recognition and returned to Mexico; hostilities promptly ensued. On 25 April 1846, a Mexican force under colonel Anastasio Torrejon surprised and defeated a U.S. squadron at the Rancho de Carricitos in Matamoros in an event that would later be known as the Thornton Skirmish; this was the pretext that U.S. president James K. Polk used to persuade the U.S. congress into declaring a state of war against Mexico on 13 May 1846. U.S. Army captain John C. Frémont, with about sixty well-armed men, had entered the California territory in December 1845 before the war had been official and was marching slowly to Oregon when he received word that war between Mexico and the U.S. was imminent; thus began a chapter of the war known as the Bear Flag Revolt.

On 20 September 1846, the U.S. launched an attack on Monterrey, which fell after 5 days. After this U.S. victory, hostilities were suspended for 7 weeks, allowing Mexican troops to leave the city with their flags displayed in full honors as U.S. soldiers regrouped and regained their losses. In August 1846, Commodore David Conner and his squadron of ships were in Veracruzian waters; he tried, unsuccessfully, to seize the Fort of Alvarado, which was defended by the Mexican Navy. The Americans were forced to relocate to Antón Lizardo. In confronting resistance and fortifications at the port of Veracruz, the U.S. Army and Marines implemented an intense bombardment of the city from 22 to 26 March 1847, causing about five hundred civilian deaths and significant damage to homes, buildings, and merchandise. General Winfield Scott and Commodore Matthew C. Perry capitalized on this civilian suffering: by refusing to allow the consulates of Spain and France to assist in civilian evacuation, they pressed Mexican Gen. Juan Morales to negotiate surrender.

U.S. commodore Matthew C. Perry, who had already captured the town of Frontera, in Tabasco, tried to seize San Juan Bautista (modern Villahermosa), but he was repelled three times by a Mexican garrison of just under three hundred men. U.S. troops were also sent to the California territories with the intention of seizing it. After squads of U.S. troops occupied the City of Los Angeles, Mexican authorities were forced to move to Sonora; but, by the end of September 1846, commander José María Flores was able to gather 500 Mexicans and managed to defeat the U.S. garrison at Los Angeles and then sent detachments to Santa Barbara and San Diego. After putting up a fierce defense against the U.S. invasion, the Mexican positions along the state of Chihuahua began to fall. These forces had been organized by general José Antonio de Heredia and governor Ángel Trías Álvarez. The cavalry of the latter made several desperate charges against the U.S. that nearly achieved victory, but his inexperience in fighting was evident and, in the end, all the positions gained were lost.

=== French intervention ===
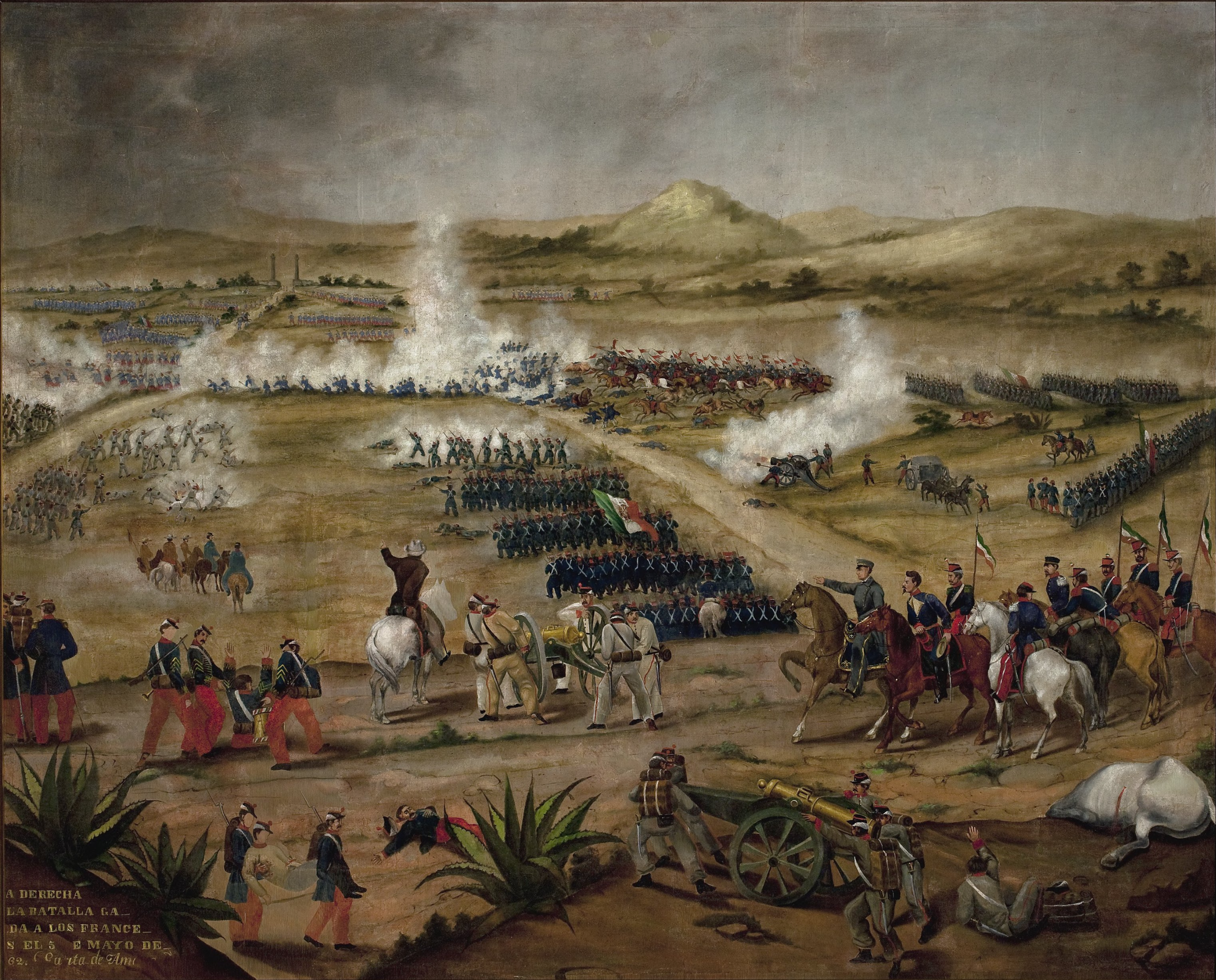
The Battle of Puebla

The French intervention was an invasion by an expeditionary force sent by the Second French Empire, supported in the beginning by the United Kingdom and the Kingdom of Spain. It followed President Benito Juárez's suspension of interest payments to foreign countries on 17 July 1861, which angered Mexico's major creditors: Spain, France and Britain.

Napoleon III of France was the instigator: His foreign policy was based on a commitment to free trade. For him, a friendly government in Mexico provided an opportunity to expand free trade by ensuring European access to important markets, and preventing monopoly by the United States. Napoleon also needed the silver that could be mined in Mexico to finance his empire. Napoleon built a coalition with Spain and Britain at a time the U.S. was engaged in a full-scale civil war. The U.S. protested, but could not intervene directly until its civil war was over in 1865.

The three powers signed the Treaty of London on 31 October, to unite their efforts to receive payments from Mexico. On 8 December, the Spanish fleet and troops from Spanish-controlled Cuba arrived at Mexico's main Gulf port, Veracruz. When the British and Spanish discovered that the French planned to invade Mexico, they withdrew.

The subsequent French invasion resulted in the Second Mexican Empire, which was supported by the Roman Catholic clergy, many conservative elements of the upper class, and some indigenous communities. The presidential terms of Benito Juárez (1858–71) were interrupted by the rule of the Habsburg monarchy in Mexico (1864–67). Conservatives, and many in the Mexican nobility, tried to revive the monarchical form of government (see: First Mexican Empire) when they helped to bring to Mexico an archduke from the Royal House of Austria, Maximilian Ferdinand, or Maximilian I of Mexico (who married Charlotte of Belgium, also known as Carlota of Mexico), with the military support of France. France had various interests in this Mexican affair, such as seeking reconciliation with Austria, which had been defeated during the Franco-Austrian War, counterbalancing the growing U.S. power by developing a powerful Catholic neighbouring empire, and exploiting the rich mines in the north-west of the country.

==== Mexican Republican forces ====
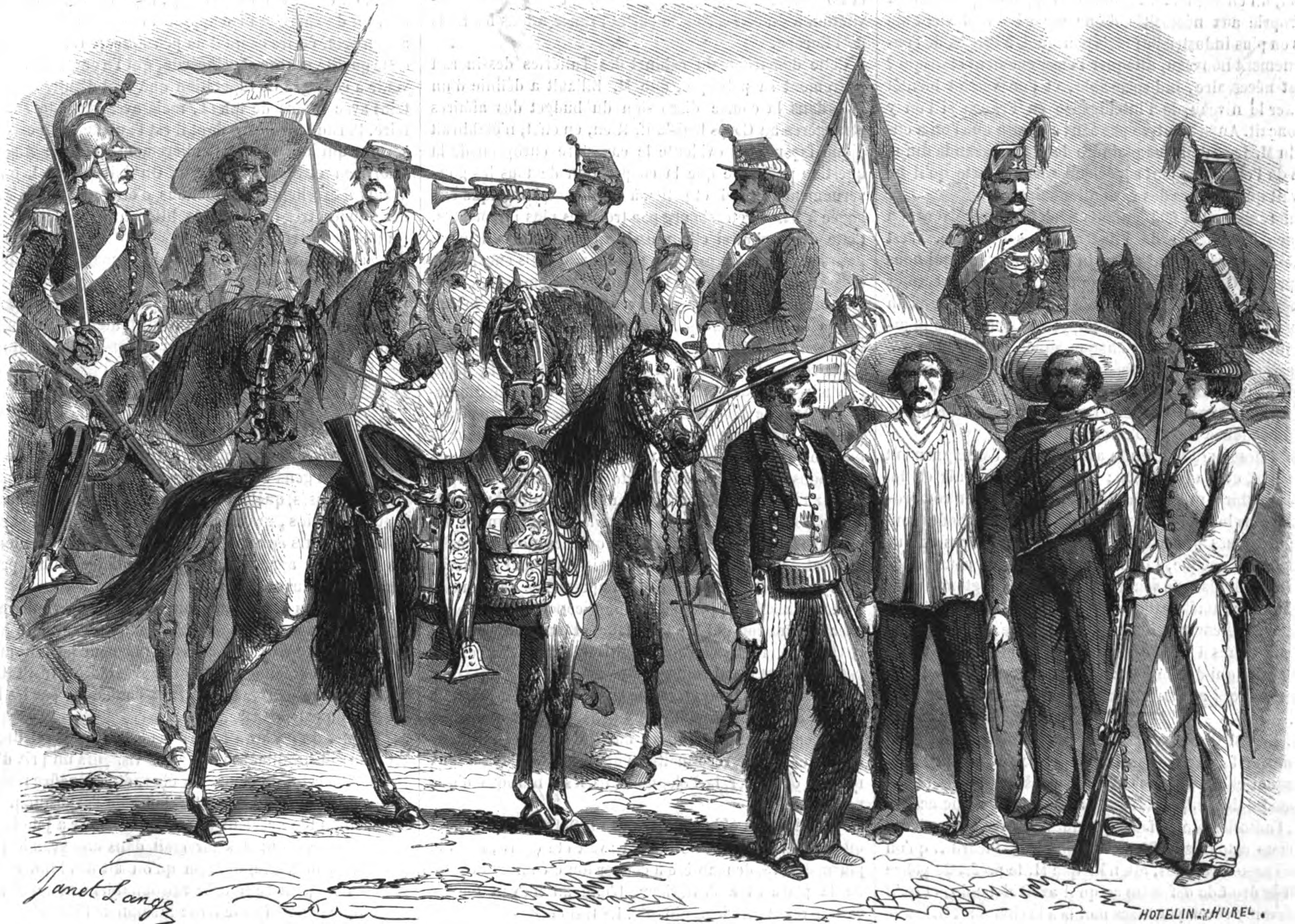
1863 illustration of Mexican Republican Army soldiers

In 1861, the Mexican Republican Army consisted of ten regular line battalions each of eight companies, and six line cavalry regiments, each of two squadrons. With six batteries of field artillery plus engineers, train and garrison units, the regular army numbered about 12,000 men. Auxiliary forces, comprising state militias and National Guards, provided a further 25 infantry battalions and 25 cavalry squadrons plus some garrison and artillery units. The National Guard of the Federal District of Mexico City amounted to six infantry battalions plus one each of cavalry and artillery. The newly raised corps of Rurales, created on 5 May 1861 as a mounted gendarmerie, numbered 2,200 and served as dispersed units of light cavalry against the French.

While opposed by substantial forces of French regular troops plus Mexican Imperial forces and contingents of foreign volunteers, the Republican Army remained in being as an effective force after the fall of Mexico City in 1863. By 1865 Liberal opposition was being led by a core of 50,000 regular Mexican troops and state National Guards, augmented by approximately 10,000 guerrillas.

=== Díaz era ===
Following the French withdrawal and the overthrow of the Imperial regime of Maximilian, the Mexican Republic was re-established in 1867. In 1876, Porfirio Diaz, a leading general of the anti-Maximilianist forces, became president. He was to retain power until 1910, with only one short break. During the early part of this period of extended rule, Diaz relied essentially on military power to remain in office. However he was able to develop other support bases and the army became a reliable non-political instrument for maintaining internal order.

Diaz undertook a series of reforms intended to modernize the Mexican Army, while at the same time terminating the historic pattern of local commanders attempting to seize power using irregulars or provincial forces. The increasingly elderly generals of the Federal Army were frequently transferred and kept loyal through opportunities for graft. By the early 1900s the large officer corps was benefiting from professional training along Prussian Army lines and improved career opportunities for cadets of middle-class origin. Finally, an efficient mounted police force of rurales took over responsibility for public order, and the army itself was reduced in size by about a third.

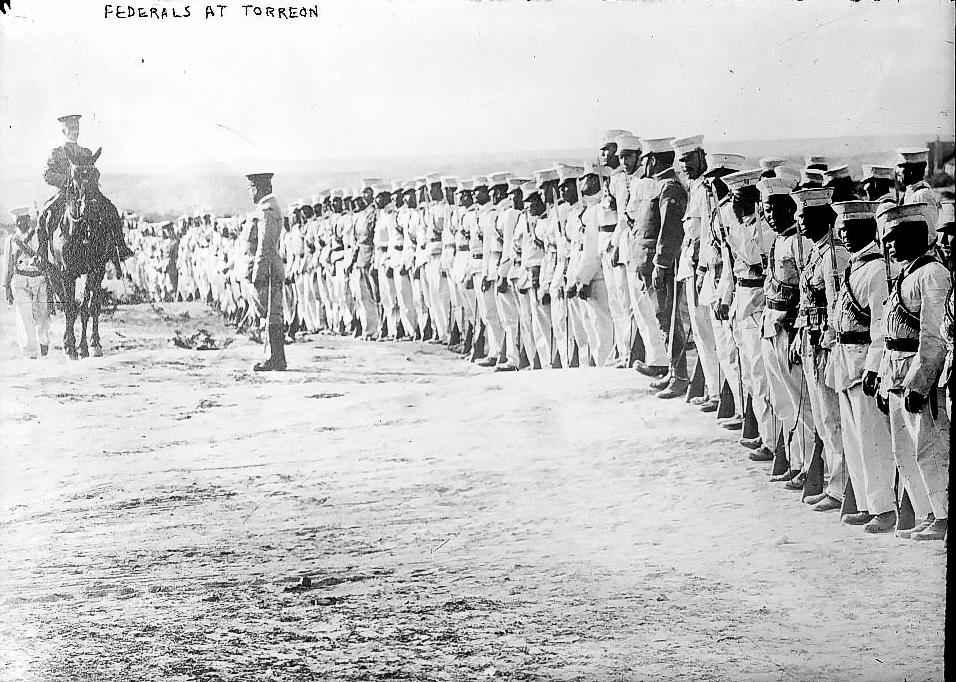
Mexican Federal Army troops in Torreón, c. 1914

A continuing weakness in the Mexican Army throughout the Diaz period was the low morale and motivation of the rank-and-file. They mostly consisted of Indian and mestizo conscripts, forced into service under the random leva system. Some were enlisted as a means of punishment or because of social discrimination, and a number of future revolutionary leaders received their initial military experience in the ranks of the Federal Army.

By 1910, the army numbered about 25,000 men, largely conscripts of Indian origin officered by 4,000 white middle-class officers. While generally well equipped, the Federal Army under Diaz was too small in numbers to offer effective opposition to the revolutionary forces led by Francisco Madero. During the long period of Porfirian stability, increased reliance had been placed on the new railway network to quickly move small numbers of troops to suppress regional unrest. When faced with widespread revolution during 1910-11 the railway lines proved too vulnerable, regular army strength too limited and state militias too disorganised to control the situation.

=== Mexican Revolution 1910–1920 ===
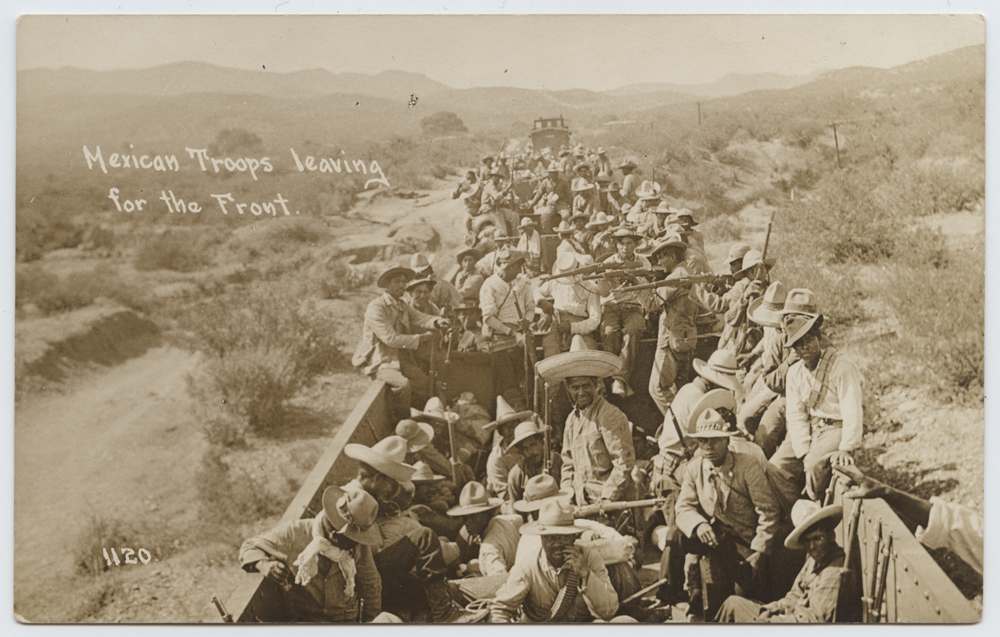
Mexican troops during the Mexican Revolution

The ouster of Porfirio Díaz saw Francisco I. Madero: a member of a rich landowning family, elected as President of Mexico. Madero kept the Federal Army intact, despite the fact that it had been outmaneuvered by the revolutionary forces that brought him to power. General Victoriano Huerta overthrew Madero in a bloody February 1913 coup. Forces opposed to the Huerta regime united against him, particularly the Constitutionalists in the north. These were led by a civilian, Venustiano Carranza as "First Chief," commanding forces led by a number of generals, but most prominently Alvaro Obregón and Pancho Villa. In the Morelos region, an intense guerrilla warfare was waged by forces led by Emiliano Zapata. The Federal Army supporting Huerta was defeated at the Battle of Zacatecas and finally disbanded in 1914 and a new Government army was created from Obregón's Constitutionalist forces.

Zapata was assassinated in 1919; Villa was bought off and took up civilian life in northern Mexico, before being assassinated in 1923. During the post-military phase following 1920, a number of Constitutionalist leaders became presidents of Mexico: Alvaro Obregón (1920–1924), Plutarco Elías Calles (1924–28), Lázaro Cárdenas (1934–1940), and Manuel Avila Camacho (1940–1946). When Lázaro Cárdenas reorganized the political party founded by Plutarco Elías Calles, he created sectoral representation of groups in Mexico, one of which was the Mexican Army. In the subsequent reorganization of the party, which took place in 1946, the Institutional Revolutionary Party no longer had a separate sector for the army. No military man has been president of Mexico after 1946.

=== Contemporary era ===
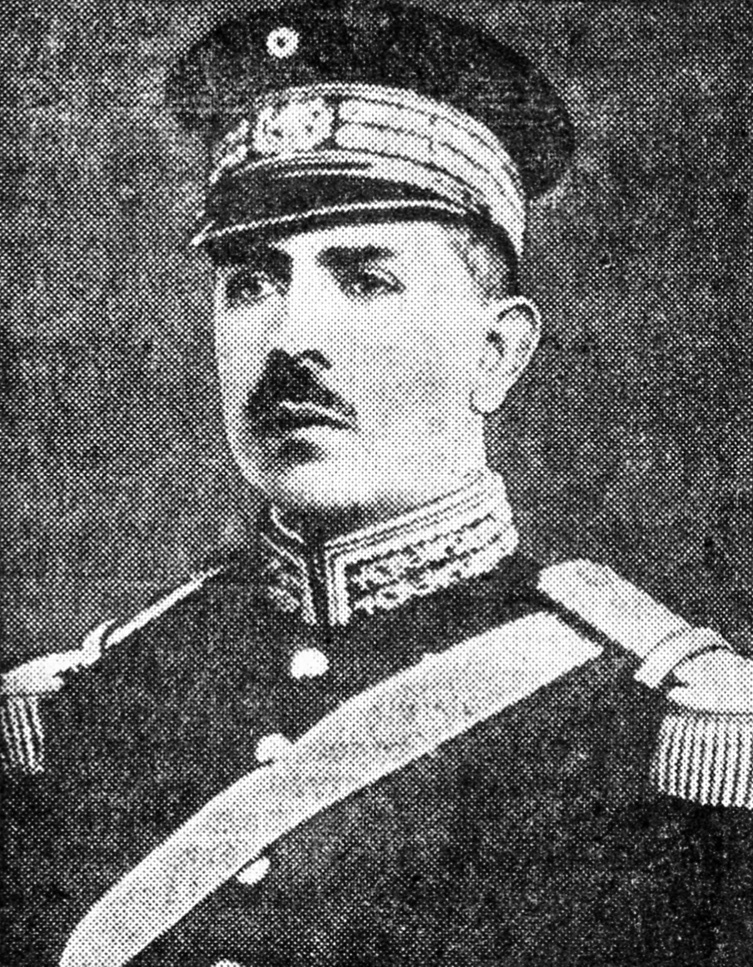
General Lázaro Cárdenas, who as president of Mexico 1934–1940 brought the Mexican military under civilian control

==== Post-revolutionary period ====
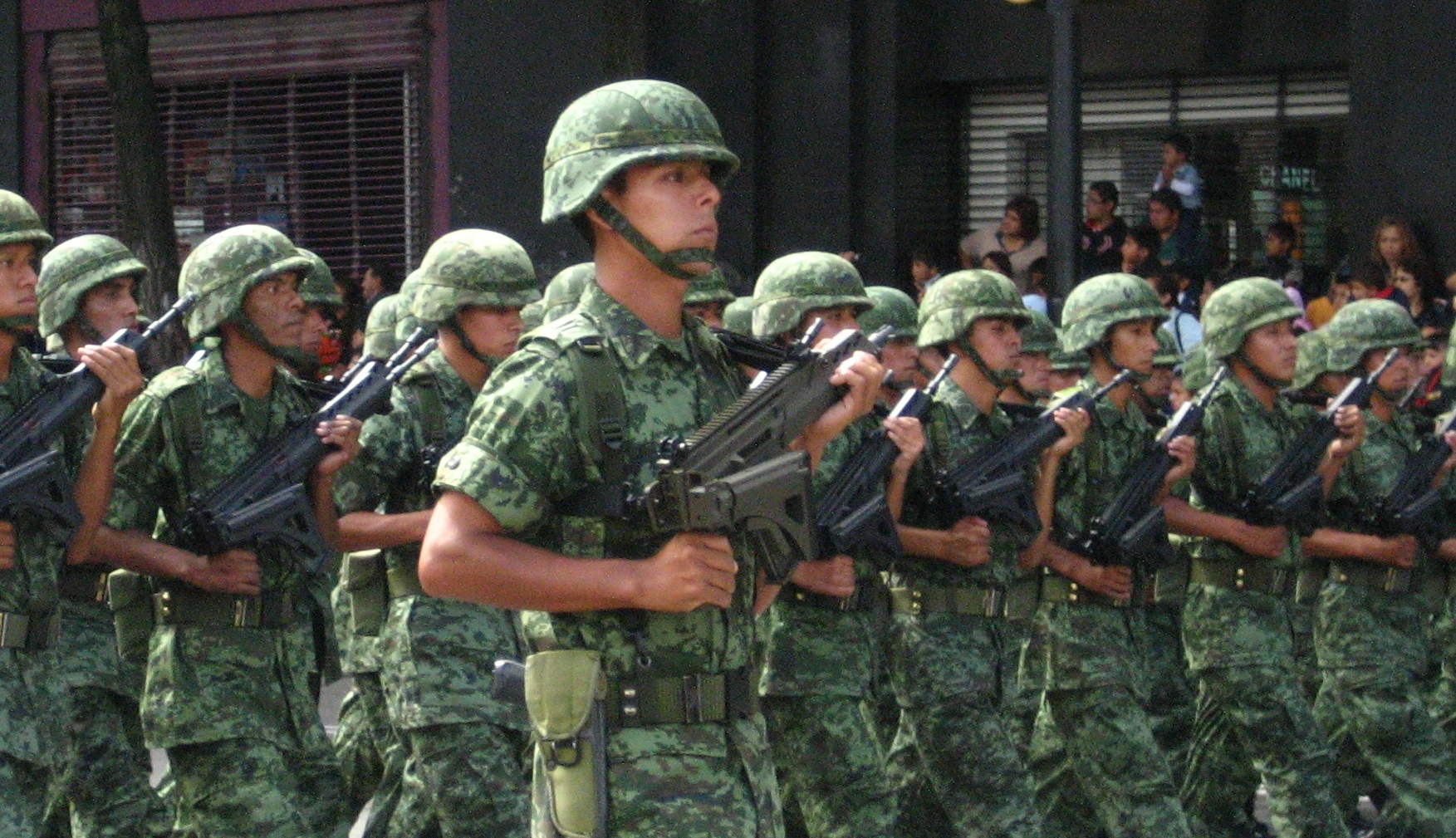
Mexican soldiers on parade in Mexico's independence day parade in 2009, Mexico DF, carrying Mexican FX-05 Xiuhcoatl (Fire Serpent) assault rifles.

The ending of the Diaz regime saw a resurgence of numerous local forces led by revolutionary generals. In 1920, more than 80,000 Mexicans were under arms, with only a minority forming part of regular forces obedient to a central authority. During the 1920s, the new government demobilised the revolutionary bands, reopened the Colegio Militar (Military Academy), established the Escuela Superior de Guerra (Staff College), and raised the salaries and improved the conditions of service of the rank and file of the regular army. In spite of an abortive generals' revolt in 1927, the result was a professional army obedient to the central government.

During this period the army was reduced in numbers through the disbandment of twenty mounted cavalry regiments, ten infantry battalions and the majority of the specialist railroad units previously required. In 1937 a process of accelerated modernisation began with the creation of companies of light tanks, mechanised infantry and motorised anti-aircraft batteries.

During the 1930s, the political role of the officer corps was reduced by the governing Revolutionary Party and a workers' militia was established, outnumbering the regular army by two to one. By the end of World War II, the Mexican Army had become a strictly professional force focused on national defense rather than political involvement.

==== Mexican drug war ====
Although violence between drug cartels has been occurring long before the war began, the government held a generally passive stance regarding cartel violence during the 1990s and the early years of the 21st century. That changed on 11 December 2006, when newly elected President Felipe Calderón sent 6,500 federal troops to the state of Michoacán to end drug violence there. This action is regarded as the first major retaliation made against the cartel violence, and is generally viewed as the starting point of the war between the government and the drug cartels. As time progressed, Calderón continued to escalate his anti-drug campaign, in which there are now about 45,000 troops involved along with state and federal police forces.

In recent times, the Mexican military has largely participated in efforts against drug trafficking. The Operaciones contra el narcotrafico (Operations against drug trafficking), for example, describes its purpose in regards to "the performance of the Mexican Army and Air Force in the permanent campaign against the drug trafficking is sustained properly in the duties that the Executive of the Nation grants to the armed forces", for according to Article 89, Section VI of the Constitution of the Mexican United States, it is the duty of the President of the Republic of the United Mexican States, as Supreme Commander of the Armed Forces, to ensure that the Mexican Armed Forces perform its mandate of national security within and outside the state borders.

==== Human Rights Violations ====
The Mexican Army has been involved in massacres, extrajudicial killings and incidents linked to organized crime that have drawn both national and international scrutiny. Notable cases include the Tlatelolco massacre (1968), the Acteal massacre (1997), the Iguala mass kidnapping (2014), the Tlatlaya Massacre (2014), the Technological Institute of Higher Learning of Monterrey massacre (2010) and the case of the General Jesús Gutiérrez Rebollo. These events have raised concerns regarding the military's role in internal security and its accountability in operations involving civilian populations.

Furthermore, The Mexican Army has inadvertently served as a recruitment pool for cartel organizations as in the case of Arturo Guzmán Decena.

== Structure ==
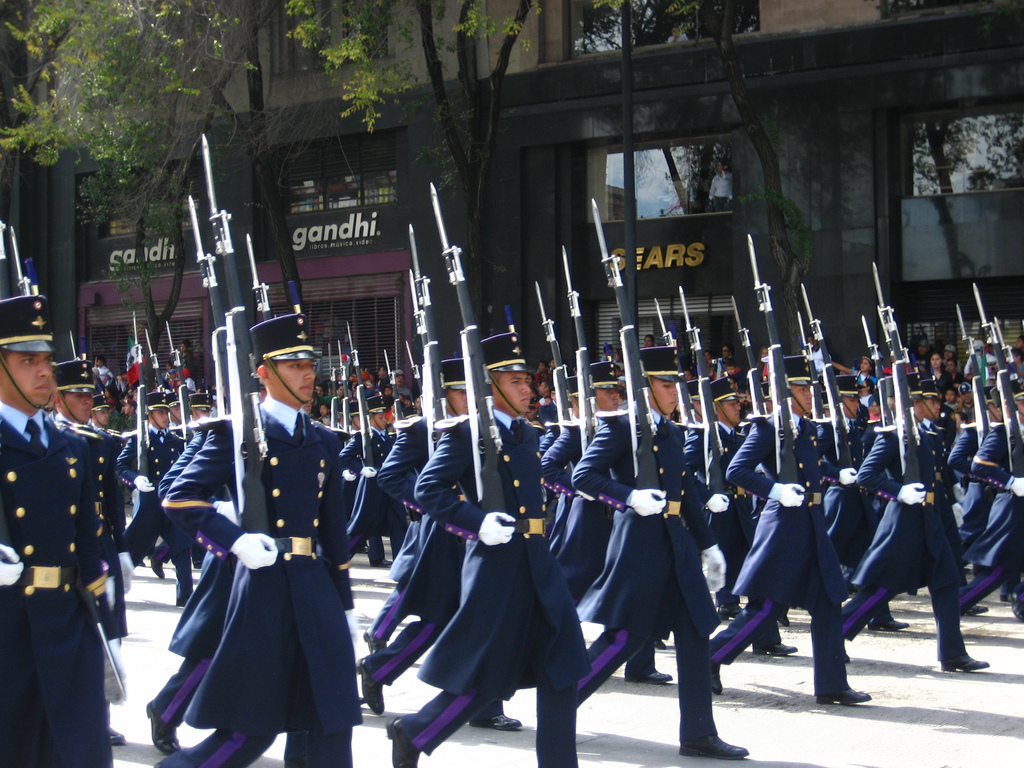
Mexican Air Force cadets march during the Mexican Independence day military parade in Mexico City on 27 July 2012.

The Army is under the authority of the National Defense Secretariat or SEDENA and is headed by the Secretary of National Defence, who is simultaneously a member of the central government and the sole four-star general. His counterpart is the Secretary of the Navy, who is a member of the central government and the sole four-star admiral.

The National Defence Secretariat has three components: a national headquarters, territorial commands, and independent units. The Secretary of National Defence delegates overall command of the Army thru the office of Commander of the Army, a divisional general-ranked officer, who leads the service via a centralized command system and many general officers and is appointed and relieved by the Secretary. The Army uses a modified continental staff system in its headquarters. The Mexican Air Force is a separate service under the SEDENA. Recruitment of personnel happens from ages 18 through 21 if secondary education was finished, 22 if High school was completed. Recruitment after age 22 is impossible in the regular army; only auxiliary posts are available. As of 2009, starting salary for Mexican army recruits was $6,000 Mexican pesos (US$500) a month with a lifetime $10,000 peso (approximately US$833) monthly pension for widows of soldiers killed in action.

The principal units of the Mexican army are ten infantry brigades and a number of independent regiments and infantry battalions. The main maneuver elements of the army are organized in three corps, each consisting of three to four infantry brigades (plus other units), all based in and around Mexico City and its metropolitan area. Distinct from the brigade formations, independent regiments and battalions are assigned to zonal garrisons (52 in total) in each of the country's 12 military regions. Infantry battalions, composed of approximately 300–350 troops, generally are deployed in each zone, and certain zones are assigned an additional motorized cavalry regiment or an artillery regiment.

=== Regional command ===
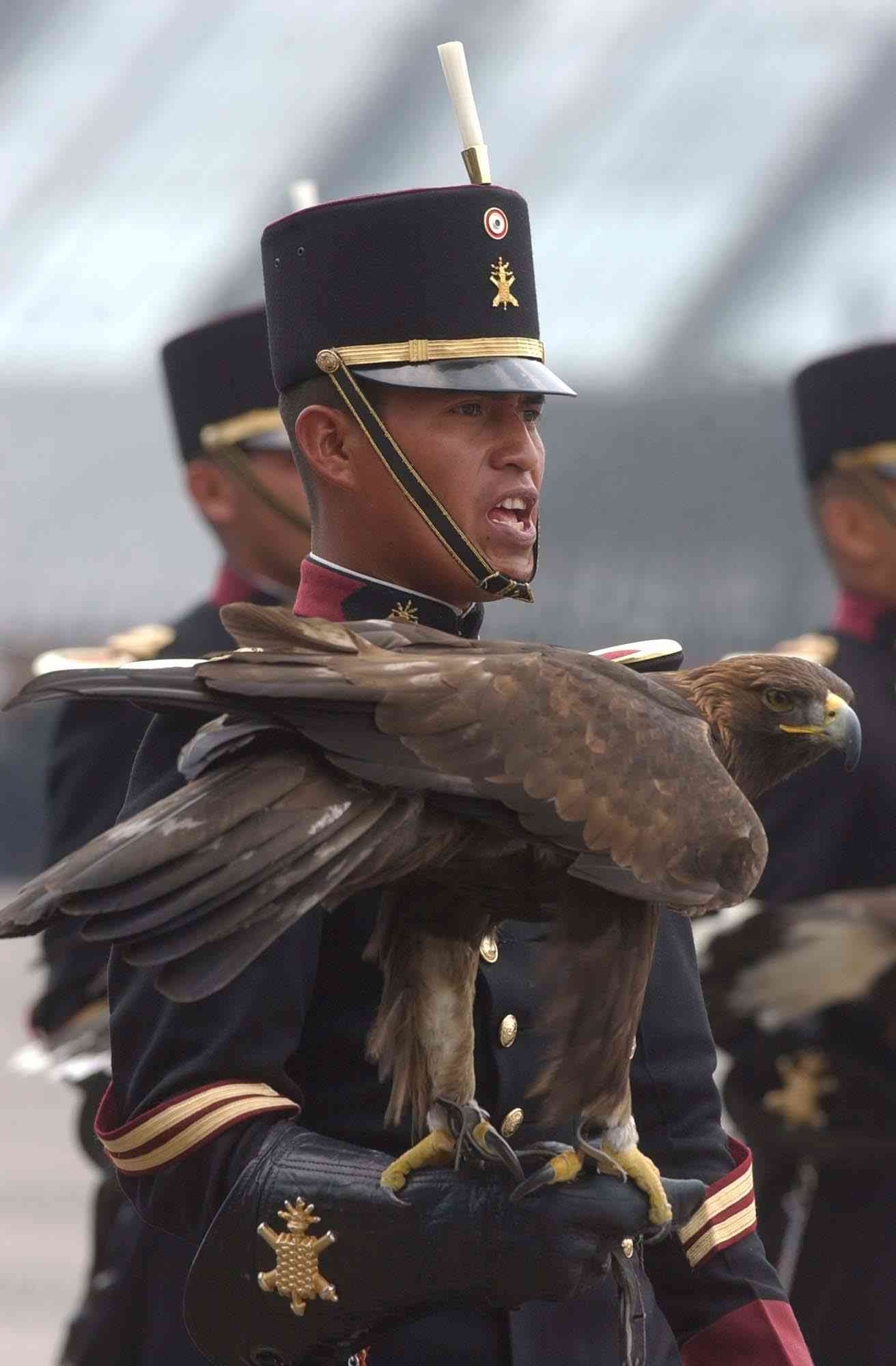
Cadets of the Heroic Military Academy (Mexico) with a golden eagle (September 2004).

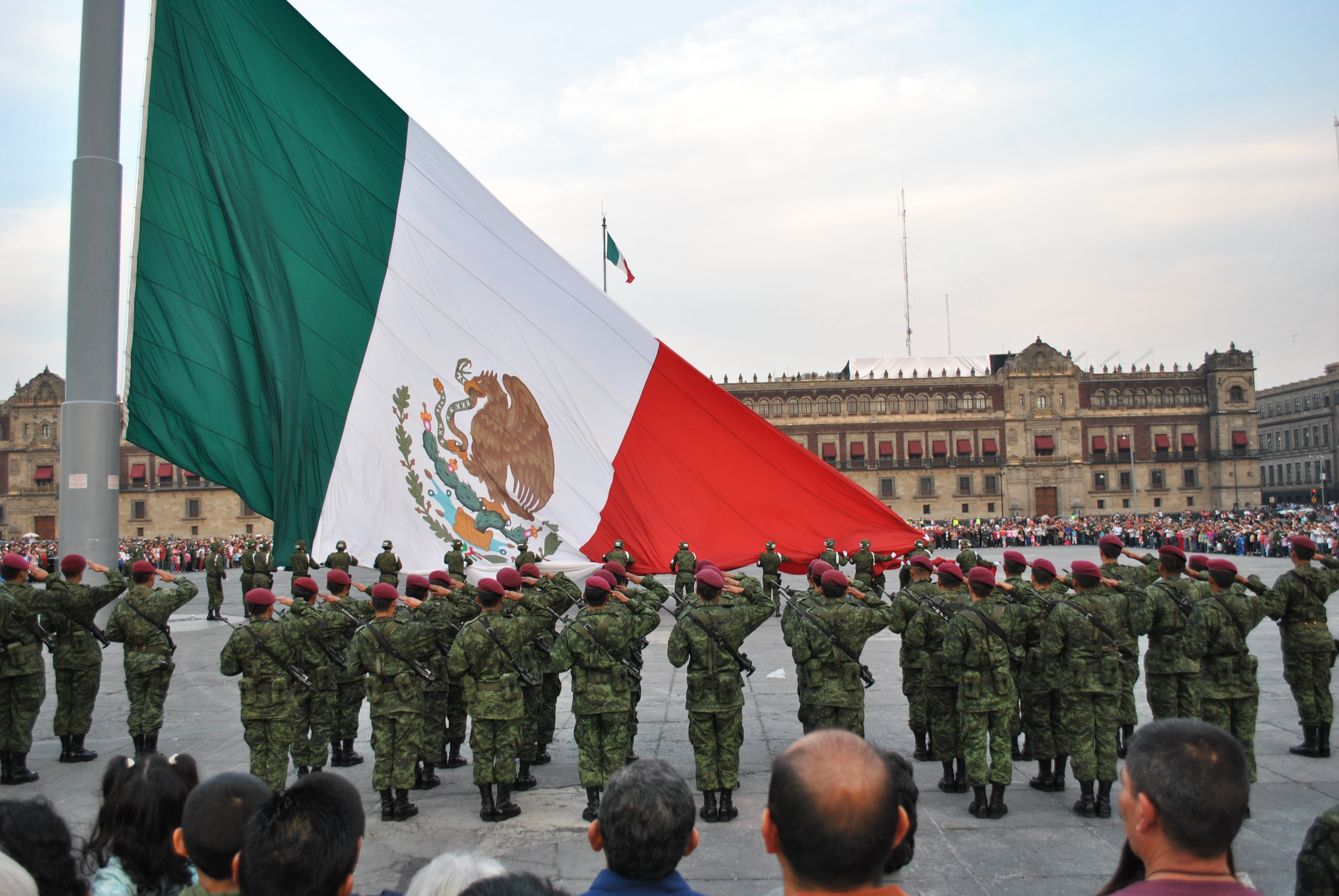
Every afternoon, a Mexican Army platoon lowers the monumental flag in Constitution Square or Zócalo.

The territorial organization of the Mexican Army includes twelve Military Regions (Regiónes militares (RM)). Each RM is commanded by a senior officer in the rank of Divisional General of the General Staff (General de División Diplomado de Estado Mayor), a three-star general. Below the military regions are forty-eight Military Zones (Zónas militares (ZM)). Each ZM is commanded by a senior officer in the rank of Brigade General of the General Staff (General de Brigada Diplomado de Estado Mayor), a two-star general. Operational needs determine how many zones are in each region, with corresponding increases and decreases in troop strength. Each commander of the Military Region is appointed and relieved by the Commander of the Army.

Usually on the secretary of defence's recommendation via the office of the Commander, the senior zone commander is also the commander of the military region containing the military zone. A military zone commander has jurisdiction over every unit operating in his territory, including the Rurales (Rural Defense Force) that occasionally have been a Federal political counterweight to the power of state governors. Zone commanders provide the national defence secretary with socio-political conditions intelligence about rural areas. Moreover, they traditionally have acted in co-ordination with the Secretariat of National Defense (SEDENA) on planning and resources deployment.

Territorial organization of the Mexican Army
Military zone	HQ	Notes
First Military Region (I Región militar) HQ in Mexico City Covers the capital Mexico City and the states of Estado de México, Hidalgo and Morelos.
1st Military Zone (1/a. Z.M.)	Tacubaya, Mexico City	
18th Military Zone (18/a. Z.M.)	Pachuca, Hidalgo	
22nd Military Zone (22/a. Z.M.)	Santa María Rayón, Estado de México	
24th Military Zone (24/a. Z.M.)	Cuernavaca, Morelos	
37th Military Zone (37/a. Z.M.)	Santa Lucía, Estado de México	
Second Military Region (II Región militar) HQ in Mexicali, Baja California Covers the states of Baja California, Baja California Sur and Sonora.
2nd Military Zone (2/a. Z.M.)	Tijuana, Baja California	
3rd Military Zone (3/a. Z.M.)	La Paz, Baja California Sur	
4th Military Zone (4/a. Z.M.)	Hermosillo, Sonora	
40th Military Zone (40/a. Z.M.)	Guerrero Negro, Baja California Sur	
45th Military Zone (45/a. Z.M.)	Nogales, Sonora	
Third Military Region (III Región militar) HQ in Mazatlán, Sinaloa Covers the states of Sinaloa and Durango.
9th Military Zone (9/a. Z.M.)	Culiacán, Sinaloa	
10th Military Zone (10/a. Z.M.)	Durango, Durango	
Fourth Military Region (IV Región militar) HQ in Monterrey, Nuevo León Covers the states of Nuevo León, San Luis Potosí and Tamaulipas.
7th Military Zone (7/a. Z.M.)	Apodaca, Nuevo León	
8th Military Zone (8/a. Z.M.)	Reynosa, Tamaulipas	
12th Military Zone (12/a. Z.M.)	San Luis Potosí, San Luis Potosí	
48th Military Zone (48/a. Z.M.)	Ciudad Victoria, Tamaulipas	
Fifth Military Region (V Región militar) HQ in Guadalajara, Jalisco Covers the states of Aguascalientes, Colima, Jalisco, Nayarit and Zacatecas.
11th Military Zone (11/a. Z.M.)	Guadalupe, Zacatecas	
13th Military Zone (13/a. Z.M.)	Tepic, Nayarit	
14th Military Zone (14/a. Z.M.)	Aguascalientes, Aguascalientes	
15th Military Zone (15/a. Z.M.)	Zapopan, Jalisco	
20th Military Zone (20/a. Z.M.)	Colima, Colima	
41st Military Zone (41/a. Z.M.)	Puerto Vallarta, Jalisco	
Sixth Military Region (VI Región militar) HQ in Veracruz, Veracruz Covers the states of Puebla, Tlaxcala and Veracruz.
19th Military Zone (19/a. Z.M.)	Tuxpan, Veracruz	
23rd Military Zone (23/a. Z.M.)	Panotla, Tlaxcala	
25th Military Zone (25/a. Z.M.)	Puebla, Puebla	
26th Military Zone (26/a. Z.M.)	Lencero, Veracruz	
29th Military Zone (29/a. Z.M.)	Minatitlán, Veracruz	
Seventh Military Region (VII Región militar) HQ in Tuxtla Gutiérrez, Chiapas Covers the states of Chiapas and Tabasco.
30th Military Zone (30/a. Z.M.)	Villahermosa, Tabasco	
31st Military Zone (31/a. Z.M.)	Rancho Nuevo, Chiapas	
36th Military Zone (36/a. Z.M.)	Tapachula, Chiapas	
38th Military Zone (38/a. Z.M.)	Tenosique, Tabasco	
39th Military Zone (39/a. Z.M.)	Ocosingo, Chiapas	
Eighth Military Region (VIII Región militar) HQ in Ixcotel, Oaxaca Covers the state of Oaxaca.
28th Military Zone (28/a. Z.M.)	Ixcotel, Oaxaca	
44th Military Zone (44/a. Z.M.)	Miahuatlán, Oaxaca	
46th Military Zone (46/a. Z.M.)	Ixtepec, Oaxaca	
Ninth Military Region (IX Región militar) HQ in Chilpancingo, Guerrero Covers the state of Guerrero.
27th Military Zone (27/a. Z.M.)	Pie de la Cuesta, Guerrero	
35th Military Zone (35/a. Z.M.)	Chilpancingo, Guerrero	
Tenth Military Region (X Región militar) HQ in Mérida, Yucatán Covers the states of Campeche, Quintana Roo and Yucatán.
32nd Military Zone (32/a. Z.M.)	Valladolid, Yucatán	
33rd Military Zone (33/a. Z.M.)	Campeche, Campeche	
34th Military Zone (34/a. Z.M.)	Chetumal, Quintana Roo	
Eleventh Military Region (XI Región militar) HQ in Torreón, Coahuila Covers the states of Chihuahua and Coahuila.
5th Military Zone (5/a. Z.M.)	Chihuahua, Chihuahua	
6th Military Zone (6/a. Z.M.)	Saltillo, Coahuila	
42nd Military Zone (42/a. Z.M.)	Hidalgo del Parral, Chihuahua	
47th Military Zone (47/a. Z.M.)	Piedras Negras, Coahuila	
Twelfth Military Region (XII Región militar) HQ in Irapuato, Guanajuato Covers the states of Guanajuato, Michoacán and Querétaro.
16th Military Zone (16/a. Z.M.)	Sarabia, Guanajuato	
17th Military Zone (17/a. Z.M.)	Querétaro, Querétaro	
21st Military Zone (21/a. Z.M.)	Morelia, Michoacán	
43rd Military Zone (43/a. Z.M.)	Apatzingán, Michoacán	

The commanding officer of a military zone has as at the least an independent infantry battalion under his jurisdiction, but also takes operational control of units deployed to his MZ area of responsibility. Force strength varies greatly from a single infantry battalion in the 3rd Military Zone covering the relatively peaceful area of Baja California Sur to over 10 infantry battalions, separate infantry companies and motorized cavalry regiments plus additional conventional and SF units on rotation in the 9th Military Zone covering the state of Sinaloa, where government troops are fighting the eponymous drug cartel.

The Mexican Air Force, which is an independent military service under the SEDENA, has its own territorial organization, separate from that of the Mexican Army. It has four air force regions: Northwest (Región Aérea del Noroeste, HQ in Hermosillo, Sonora), Northeast (Región Aérea del Noreste, HQ in Chihuahua, Chihuahua) Central (Región Aérea del Centro, HQ at Santa Lucía AFB, Estado de México) and the Southeast Air Force Region (Región Aérea del Sureste, HQ at Tuxtla Gutiérrez, Chiapas). Each new commanding officer of an air force region enters the appointment as a Wing General Pilot-Aviator of the Air Force Staff (General de Ala Piloto Aviador Diplomado de Estado Mayor Aéreo) - a two-star general and midway through his term he is promoted to a Division General Pilot-Aviator of the Air Force Staff (General de División Piloto Aviador Diplomado de Estado Mayor Aéreo) - a three-star general. A similar territorial organization is also implemented in the Mexican Navy with Naval Regions and Naval Zones as counterparts to the army territorial organization.

=== Tactical units ===
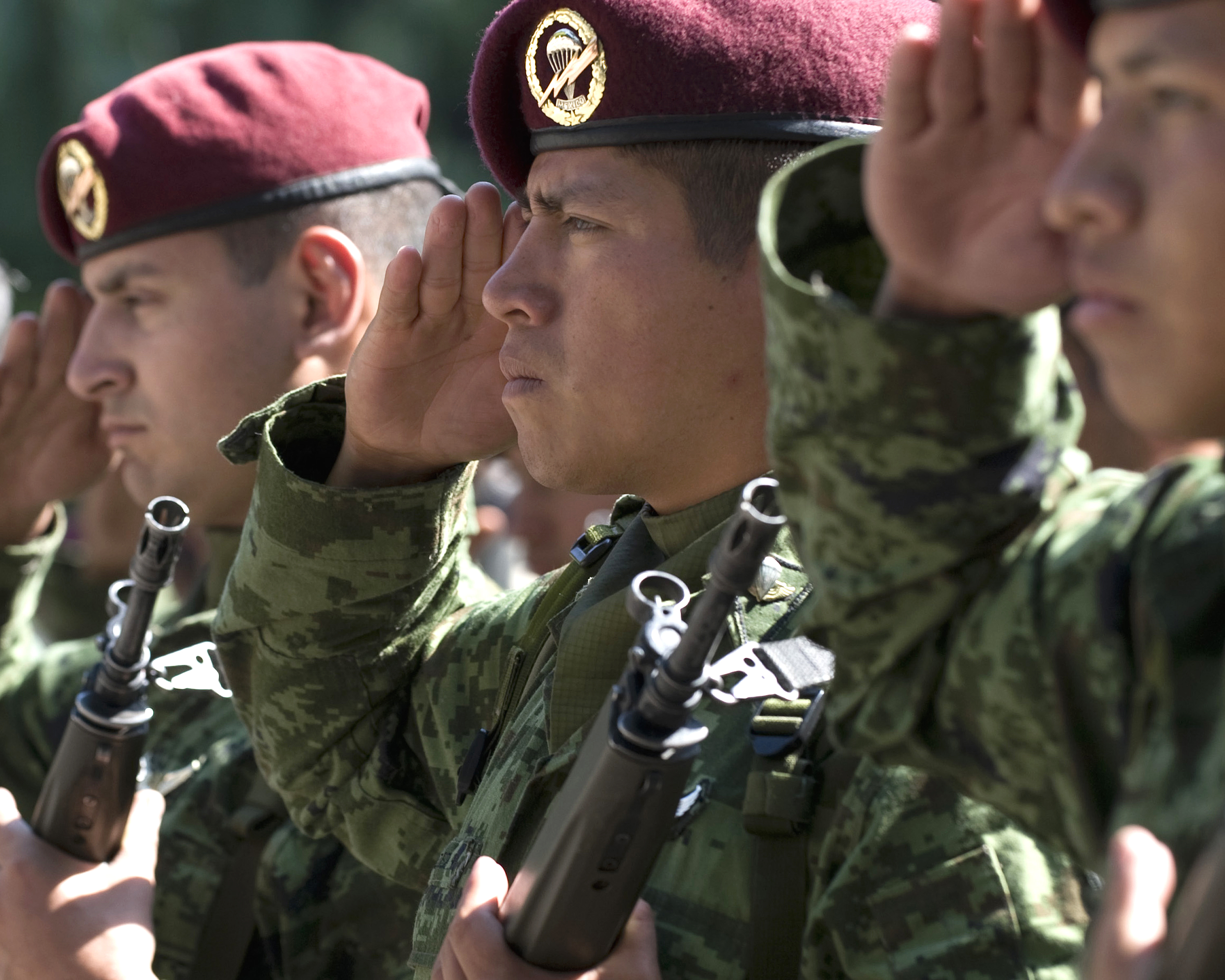
Mexican Paratroopers (March 2009)

Separate from the military regions and zones are an increasing number of brigades and some independent regiments and infantry battalions. These brigades are grouped into four corps:

- 1st Army Corps (1er Cuerpo de Ejército (ICE)) – based in and around Mexico City and its metropolitan area. The corps consists of the 1st Armored Brigade, the 1st, 2nd and 3rd Separate Infantry Brigades and the army's sole 1st Combat Engineer Brigade. Additionally 3 armored brigades (2nd, 3rd and 4th) and 3 light infantry brigades (4th, 5th and 6th) are separate from the I Army Corps AOR, but based in the same area close to the capital region, complete the Mexican Army's maneuver formations.
- Special Forces Corps (Cuerpo de Fuerzas Especiales) – HQ, training center and the bulk of special forces battalions are based in Temamatla in the State of Mexico. The corps has 3 SF brigades headquartered in Puebla, Puebla (1st), Tijuana, Baja California (2nd) and Ixtepec, Oaxaca (3rd) and the SF battalions are re-assigned between them as per operational requirements.
- Military Police Corps (Cuerpo de Policía Militar) – the corps has previously been used to augment the internal security initiatives of the government in the combat against the drug cartels and military police brigades as well as individual personnel have been transferred in the past to the newly formed (and consequently defunct Federal Police, supplemented by its Gendarmerie Division, also defunct). New MP brigades were later formed to make up for the ones that were transferred. The administration of President Enrique Peña Nieto set the ambitious plan for the expansion of the Military Police from 3 to 12 MP brigades - one for each military region. By the end of his term there were ten active military police brigades:
  - 1st Military Police Brigade (1/a. Brigada de Policía Militar) – Campo Militar 1-A, Mexico City
  - 2nd Military Police Brigade (2/a. Brigada de Policía Militar) – Air Base Nr. 1 - Santa Lucía, Tecámac, State of México
  - 3/a. Brigada de Policía Militar – El Sauz, Sinaloa
  - 4/a. Brigada de Policía Militar – General Escobedo, Nuevo León
  - 5/a. Brigada de Policía Militar – San Miguel de los Jagüeyes, State of México
  - 6/a. Brigada de Policía Militar – Puebla, Puebla
  - 7/a. Brigada de Policía Militar – Tuxtla Gutiérrez, Chiapas
  - 10/a. Brigada de Policía Militar – Isla Mujeres Quintana Roo
  - 11/a. Brigada de Policía Militar – San Pedro de las Colonias Coahuila
  - 12/a. Brigada de Policía Militar – Irapuato, Guanajuato

Each MP brigade has three line military police battalions (sing.: Batallón de Policía Militar) and one special operations military police battalion (Batallón de Operaciones Especiales de Policía Militar, equipped with Plasan Sand Cat tactical armored cars) plus support units. Special Operations MP Bns carry the number of their parent brigade, line MP Bns are numbered in sequence, starting from 1st, 2nd and 3rd in the 1st MP Brigade, 4th, 5th and 6th in the 2nd MP Bde etc. up to 34th, 35th and 36th in the 12th Military Police Brigade, with battalion numbers 22nd - 27th retained for the non-active 8th and 9th MP Brigades. The MPC's involvement in the internal security policies is also present with the Federal Police's successor agency - the National Guard. In 2020 the NG had a strength of ca. 80,000 personnel. and in 2021 this number has increased to 102,000 with a goal set at 150,000. This rapid increase capitalizes heavily on the resources of the military. According to the Mexican Instituto Nacional de Transparencia 31 431 former Army and 6,337 former Navy military police personnel joined the National Guard. Its 8 training centers (Centros de Adiestramiento) are located in and rely on the resources of the army military police installations: two (one main and one NCO) training centers are located at the Campo Militar 37-C in San Miguel de los Jagüeyes, Municipality of Huehuetoca, State of México at the base of the 5th Military Police Brigade. The other six training centers are located at the military police bases in Sauz, Sinaloa (3rd MP Bde), San Pedro de las Colonias, Coahuila (11th MP Bde), Apodaca, Nuevo León (4th MP Bde), Puebla (6th MP Bde), Irapuato (12th MP Bde) and Isla Mujeres (10th MP Bde). The main reasoning behind the formation of the National Guard was to reduce the involvement of the military in the Mexican drug war, but the implementation has negated that to a great extend with the NG relying heavily on the military for staffing, training, basing and operational control. On the latter point the NG's units are called Battalions Type B (sing.: Batallón Tipo B) to distinguish them from the 'regular' infantry and MP battalions of the Mexican Army, all 85 Battalions Type B are based in army bases and are assigned to the 12 military regions of the Army.

- Presidential Guard Corps (Cuerpo de Guardias Presidenciales) – the special department of the President's Office, the Estado Mayor Presidencial used to command the Army, Air Force and Navy assets tasked with the security, land and air transport and the logistical requirements of the Office. As one of his first political initiatives upon entering the Presidency Andrés Manuel López Obrador has put to vote in the Mexican Senate the disbanding of the EMP. The vote passed and the department was dismantled at the end of 2018. At that time it included 6,026 servicemen and women from the three armed services, organised into:
  - Staff (Estado Mayor)
  - Presidential Guard Corps (Cuerpo de Guardias Presidenciales)
    - Headquarters (Cuartel General)
    - 6 presidential guard battalions (1/er. - 6/o. Batallón de Guardias Presidenciales)
    - 1st Transport Battalion (1/er. Batallón de Transportes)
    - 1st Supply Company (1/a. Compañía de Intendencia')
    - 24th Presidential Guard Marine Infantry Battalion (24/o. Batallón de Infantería de Marina de Guardias Presidenciales) - as the single Department of the Navy asset in the EMP and infantry-oriented, the 24/o. BIMGP was attached to the CGP.
    - 1st Mounted Cavalry Group (1.er Grupo de Caballería Montado)
      - Honor Guard Cavalry Squadron (Escuadrón de Caballería de Honores)
      - Horse Artillery Battery (Batería Hipómovil)
    - 1st Combat Engineer Company (1/a. Compañía de Ingenieros de Combate)
    - Honor Guard Artillery Battery (Batería de Artillería de Honores)
    - Music Band(Banda de Música)
  - General Coordination Department of the Presidential Transport Aircraft (Coordinación General de Transportes Aéreos Presidenciales) (a staff department, part of the Staff mentioned above)
    - Presidential Transport Air Group (Grupo Aéreo de Transportes Presidenciales) (since the disbanding of the EMP the Coordinación General has been closed down too and the GATP became the 6th Air Group of the Mexican Air Force)

After the closure of the EMP the servicemen and women have lost their special status of personnel distinct from the three services and were integrated back into the Army, Air Force and Navy. Government plans call for the transformation of the Presidential Guard Corps into two military police brigades.

Distinct from the brigade formations are independent regiments (all regiments are battalion-sized) and battalions assigned to zonal garrisons. Groups are company-sized units. The different types of units of the Mexican Army follow a sequential listing starting from 1. onwards. They include the following:

- 110 infantry battalions (sing.: Batallón de infantería) (with more being planned for activation. 110 is the total quantity of infantry battalions assigned to military zones and assigned to brigades)
- 24 separate infantry companies (sing.: Compañía de infantería no encuadrada)
- 3 parachute rifle battalions (sing.: Batallón de fusileros paracaidistas – 1st Batallón is part of the Army, 2nd and 3rd formally belong to the Air Force)
- 25 motorized cavalry regiments (sing.: Regimiento de caballería motorizado)
- 9 armored reconnaissance regiments (sing.: Regimiento blindado de reconocimiento)
- 8 mechanized regiments (sing.: Regimiento mecanizado)
- 9 artillery regiments (sing.: Regimiento de artillería)
- 8 mortar group of caliber 81-mm (sing.: Grupo de morteros de calibre 81-mm)
- 6 recoil-less rifle groups of caliber 106-mm (sing.: Grupo de cañones sin retroceso de calibre 106-mm)
- ? combat engineer battalions (sing.: Batallón de ingenieros de combate) (sources, which have reported previously small numbers of the quantity of combat engineer battalions in the Mexican Army are outdated, as official statements by the government report 8 combat engineer battalions deployed from the Mexican Army and Air Force deployed to the states of Baja California Sur, Chiapas, Ciudad de México, Estado de México, Guerrero, Jalisco, Veracruz and Yucatán in the summer of 2021 to deal with the aftermath of torrential rains and hurricanes.)

Infantry battalions are small, each of approximately 400 troops, and are generally deployed in each zone. Certain zones are also assigned a light armored cavalry regiment, mechanized infantry regiment or one of the 24 field artillery regiments and 10 field artillery battalions. Smaller detachments are often detailed to patrol more inaccessible areas of the countryside, helping to maintain order and resolve disputes.

Other than the Special Forces and the Military Police Brigades, the Mexican Army includes the following combat brigades:

- armored - four Armored Brigades (sing.: Brigada blindada), each composed of two armored reconnaissance regiments, two mechanized regiments and smaller support units. A ninth armored reconnaissance regiment under the Army HQ functions as the training unit.
  - 1st Armored Brigade (1/a. Brigada Blindada – Temamatla (Teotihuacán), State of Mexico (brigade patch shows the formation belongs to the 1st Army Corps (1/er. Cuerpo de ejército - ICE))
  - 2nd Armored Brigade (2/a. Brigada Blindada) - Querétaro City, Querétaro (directly subordinated to Army HQ)
  - 3rd Armored Brigade (3/a. Brigada Blindada) - Puebla (city), Puebla (directly subordinated to Army HQ)
  - 4th Armored Brigade (4/a. Brigada Blindada) - Villagrán (Sarabia), Guanajuato (directly subordinated to Army HQ)
- infantry - three separate infantry brigades under 1st Army Corps and three light infantry brigades directly under army HQ. Each brigade has three infantry battalions. The light brigades lack the organic artillery and engineer units of the separate brigades.
  - 1st Separate Infantry Brigade (1/a. Brigada de Infantería Independiente) - Colonia Santa Teresa, State of Mexico
  - 2nd Separate Infantry Brigade (2/a. Brigada de Infantería Independiente) - Campo Militar No.1 - Mexico City
  - 3rd Separate Infantry Brigade (3/a. Brigada de Infantería Independiente) - Campo Militar No.1 - Mexico City
  - 4th Light Infantry Brigade (4/a. Brigada de Infantería Ligera) - Irapuato, Guanajuato
  - 5th Light Infantry Brigade (5/a. Brigada de Infantería Ligera) - Ixcotel, Oaxaca
  - 6th Light Infantry Brigade (6/a. Brigada de Infantería Ligera) - Campo Militar No.1 - Mexico City
- airborne
  - Parachute Rifle Brigade (Brigada de Fusileros Paracaidistas) - Campo Militar No.1 - Mexico City (directly subordinated to Army HQ)
- engineers
  - 1st Combat Engineer Brigade (1/a. Brigada de Ingenieros de Combate) - Campo Militar No.1 - Mexico City (subordinated to the 1st Army Corps)

=== Special Forces Corps ===
The Army has a Special Forces Corps unified command with six special forces battalions and a unit within Joint Special Operations Command. These include:

- Joint Special Operations Command (FEC) (Formerly Special Reaction Force/Special High Command Force) at Military Camp 1-F, Mexico City
- 1st Special Forces Battalion (Campo Mil. No. 37-B, Temamatla, State of Mexico.)
- 2nd Special Forces Battalion (Campo Mil. No. 37-B, Temamatla, State of Mexico.)
- 3rd Special Forces Battalion (Campo Mil. No. 37-B, Temamatla, State of Mexico.)
- 4th Special Forces Battalion (Campo Mil. No. 37-B, Temamatla, State of Mexico.)
- 5th Special Forces Battalion (Campo Mil. No. 37-B, Temamatla, State of Mexico.)
- 6th Special Forces Battalion (Campo Mil. No. 45-A, Nogales Sonora.)

Fuerza Especial Conjunta (Joint Special Operations Command) or FEC consists of the most senior specialized operators of the Special Forces Corps, Air Force and National Guard. These units conduct high impact operations, while regular special forces battalions provide support or a light infantry direct action role.

==== Special Operations Forces ====
Name	Headquarters	Structure and purpose
Cuerpo de Fuerzas Especiales (Special Forces Corps)	Campo Mil. No. 37-B, No. 45-A	Light Infantry, Direct Action
Fuerza Especial Conjunta (Joint Special Operations Command)	Camp 1-F	Counter Terrorism

=== Estado Mayor Presidencial ===
Seal of the Estado Mayor Presidencial.

The Estado Mayor Presidencial (Presidential Guard) was a specific agency of the Mexican Army that is responsible for the safety and well being of the President in the practice of all of the activities of his office. On 24 March 1985 President Miguel de la Madrid Hurtado reformed the regulation of the presidential guard and published it in the Official Gazette of the Federation (Diario Oficial de la Federación) on 4 April 1986. In this version the responsibilities of this agency included assisting the President in obtaining general information, planning the President's activities under security and preventive measures for his safety. This regulation was in force during the administrations of Carlos Salinas de Gortari and Ernesto Zedillo Ponce de Leon. On 16 January 2004 during the administration of President Vicente Fox Quesada a new regulation of the Presidential Guard was issued and published by the Official Gazette of the Federation on 23 January of that same year. This ordinance updated the structure, organization and operation of the Presidential guard as a technical military body and administrative unit of the Presidency to facilitate the implementation of the powers of his office.

The EMP was dissolved in 2018 and its military arm, the Presidential Guards Corps, has had its command becoming a joint service formation, with its units coming under the collective responsibility of the Secretariats of National Defense, Security, and the Navy, its three Army infantry battalions now converted into military police battalions as part of now two military police brigades under the revived National Guard.

=== Paratrooper Corps ===
- Brigada de Fusileros Paracaidistas (Parachute Rifle Brigade) is a three-battalion paratrooper unit created in 1969 within the Mexican Army but utilizing aircraft from the Air Force. Its headquarters is in Mexico City and its training takes place in the Centro de Adiestramiento de Paracaidismo (Airborne Training Center). A battalion can be deployed rapidly to any part of the country.

=== Rurales ===
The Rurales, officially called the Cuerpo de Defensa Rural (Rural Defense Corps), is a part-time militia force whose various units are part of the Military Region they are in. Currently, Rural Defence Force members are being utilized in the Mexican drug war. This is the case in the State of Michoacán, where the Government has attempted to restrict civilian vigilantism (such as the creation of unregulated armed security groups) by deploying rurales against local drug cartels.

== Ranks ==
=== Commissioned officer ranks ===
The rank insignia of commissioned officers.

Rank group	General / flag officers				Senior officers			Junior officers
Mexican Army
Mexican Army	Secretario de la defensa nacional	General de división	General de brigada	General brigadier	Coronel	Teniente coronel	Mayor	Capitan primero	Capitán segundo	Teniente	Subteniente

=== Other ranks ===
The rank insignia of non-commissioned officers and enlisted personnel.

Rank group	Senior NCOs		Junior NCOs	Enlisted
Mexican Army
Mexican Army	Sargento primero	Sargento segundo	Cabo	Soldado

== Military industry ==
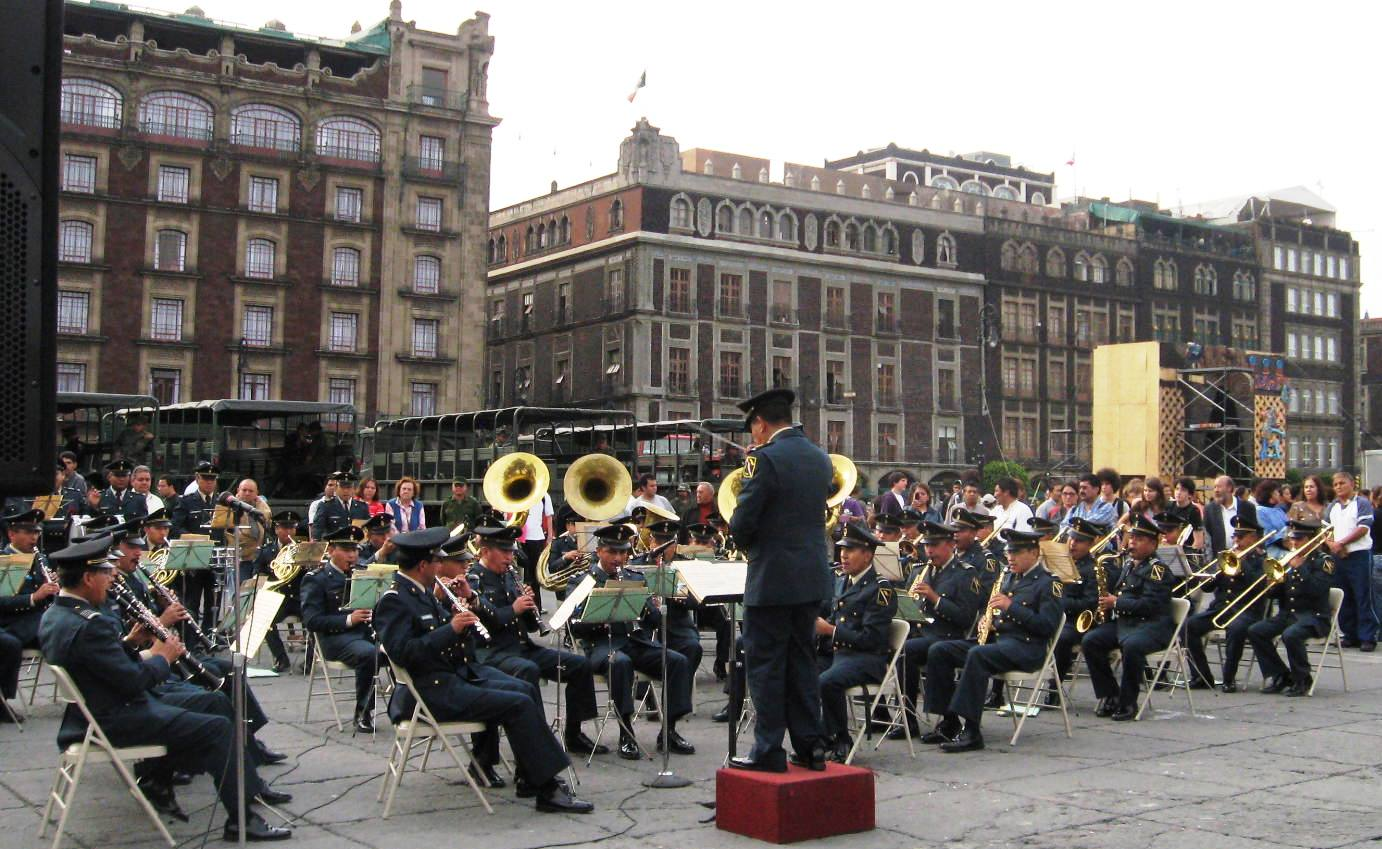
Mexican Army band playing

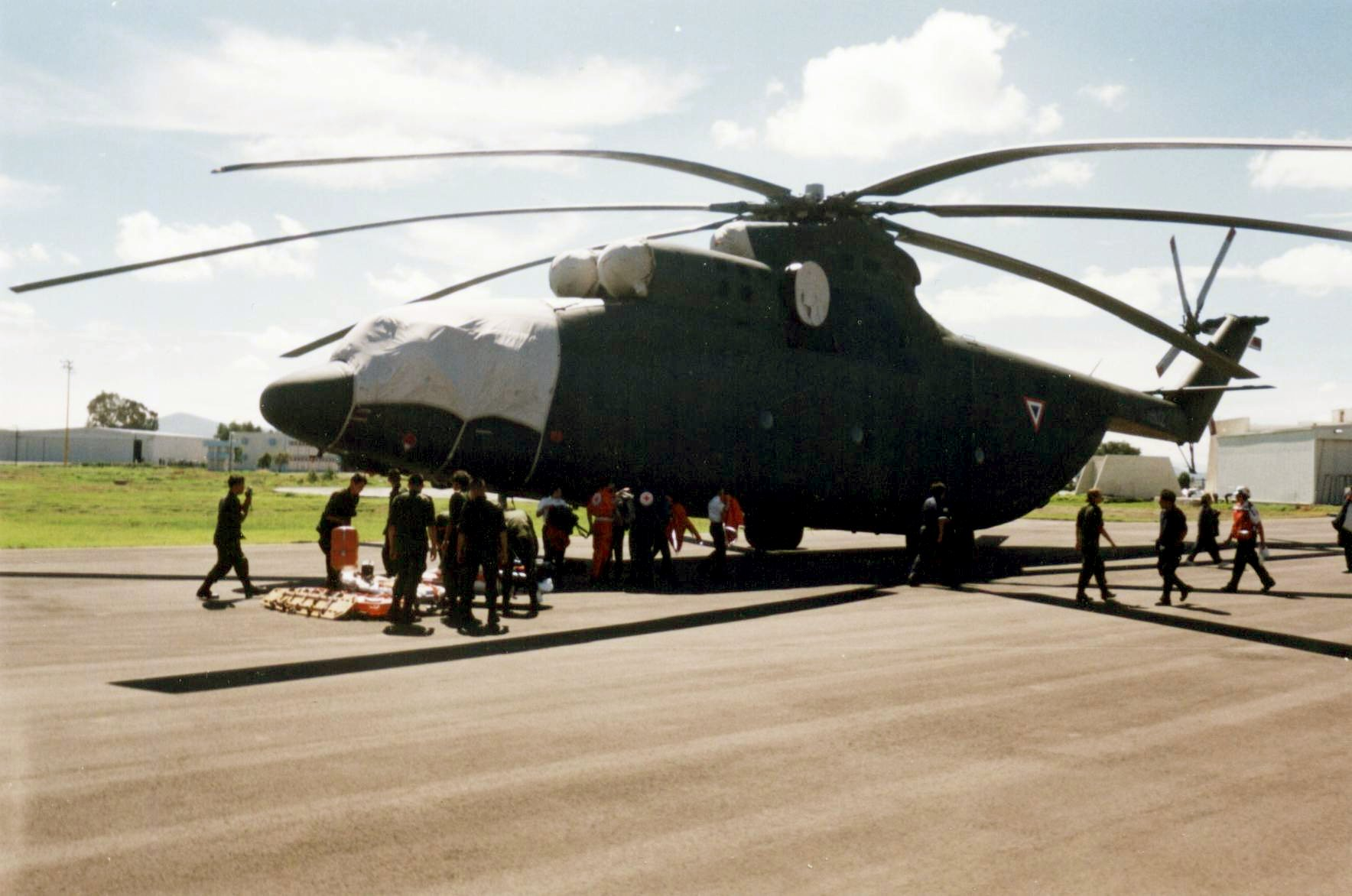
A Mexican Army Mi-26 heavy transport helicopter

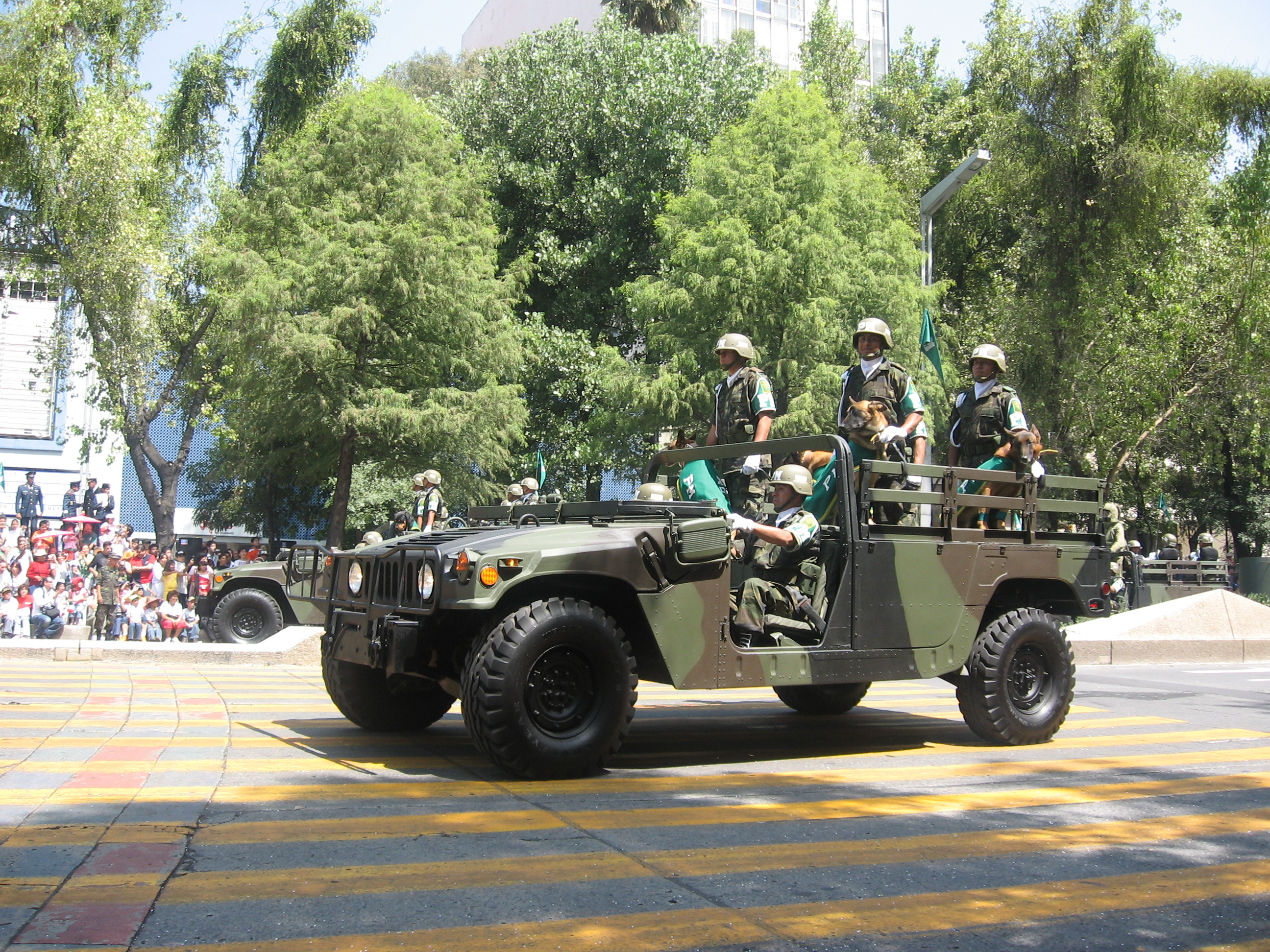
A Mexican army Humvee on 16 September 2007 parade

Since the start of the 21st century, the Army has been steadily modernising to become competitive with the armies of other American countries and have also taken certain steps to decrease spending and dependency on foreign equipment in order to become more autonomous such as the domestic production of the FX-05 rifle designed in Mexico and the commitment to researching, designing and manufacturing domestic military systems such as military electronics and body armor.

The Mexican military counts on three of the following departments to fulfill the general tasks of the Army and Air Force:

- Dirección General de Industria Militar (D.G.I.M.) – In charge of the designing, manufacturing and maintenance of vehicles and weapons, such as the assembly of the FX-05 assault rifle and the DN series armored vehicles. On 19 July 2009, SEDENA spent 488 million pesos ($37 million U.S.) to transfer technology to manufacture the G36V German made rifle. Although it is not known if this will be manufactured as a cheaper alternative to the FX-05 meant for the army or if it is to be manufactured for military police and other law enforcement agencies such as the Federal Police. The FX-05 is planned to become the new standard rifle for the armed forces replacing the Heckler & Koch G3, so it is not yet clear what the G-36 rifles will be used for. As of 2011, D.G.I.M. is in charge of assembling the Oshkosh SandCat, the modified Mexican Army version of the Sandcat is named as the DN-XI and will be presented in the Mexican Independence Day parade in September 2012.
- Dirección General de Fábricas de Vestuario y Equipo (D.G.FA.V.T.) (General Directorate of Clothing and Equipment Manufacturing) – Since its creation, the department has grown from a simple clothing factory to an Industrial complex in charge of the supply and design of the Army/Air Force's uniform, shoes/boots, combat helmet and ballistic vest. Until the mid-2000s, the Mexican army's standard combat uniform color was olive green. The army then switched to all woodland camouflage and Desert Camouflage Uniform. In July 2008, the D.G.FA.V.E. announced plans for creating the country's first digital uniforms, which would consist of Woodland/jungle and Desert camouflage; these uniforms entered service in 2009.
- Granjas Militares (Military farms) – In charge of Agriculture; crop cultivation is a necessity to maintain the health and economy of the Army/Air Force. The Mexican Army has four established SEDENA farms:
  - Granja SEDENA number 1 (San Juan del Río, Querétaro).
  - Granja SEDENA number 2 (Ixtepec, Oaxaca).
  - Granja SEDENA number 3 (Sarabia, Guanajuato).
  - Granja SEDENA number 4 (La Fuente, Aguascalientes).

== Equipment ==
=== Infantry Gears ===
Mexican Army Combat Helmet covered with “Trans Jungle” woodland camouflage pattern

Mexican Army Combat Helmet covered with desert pixelated camouflage

Mexican Army Ghillie Suit

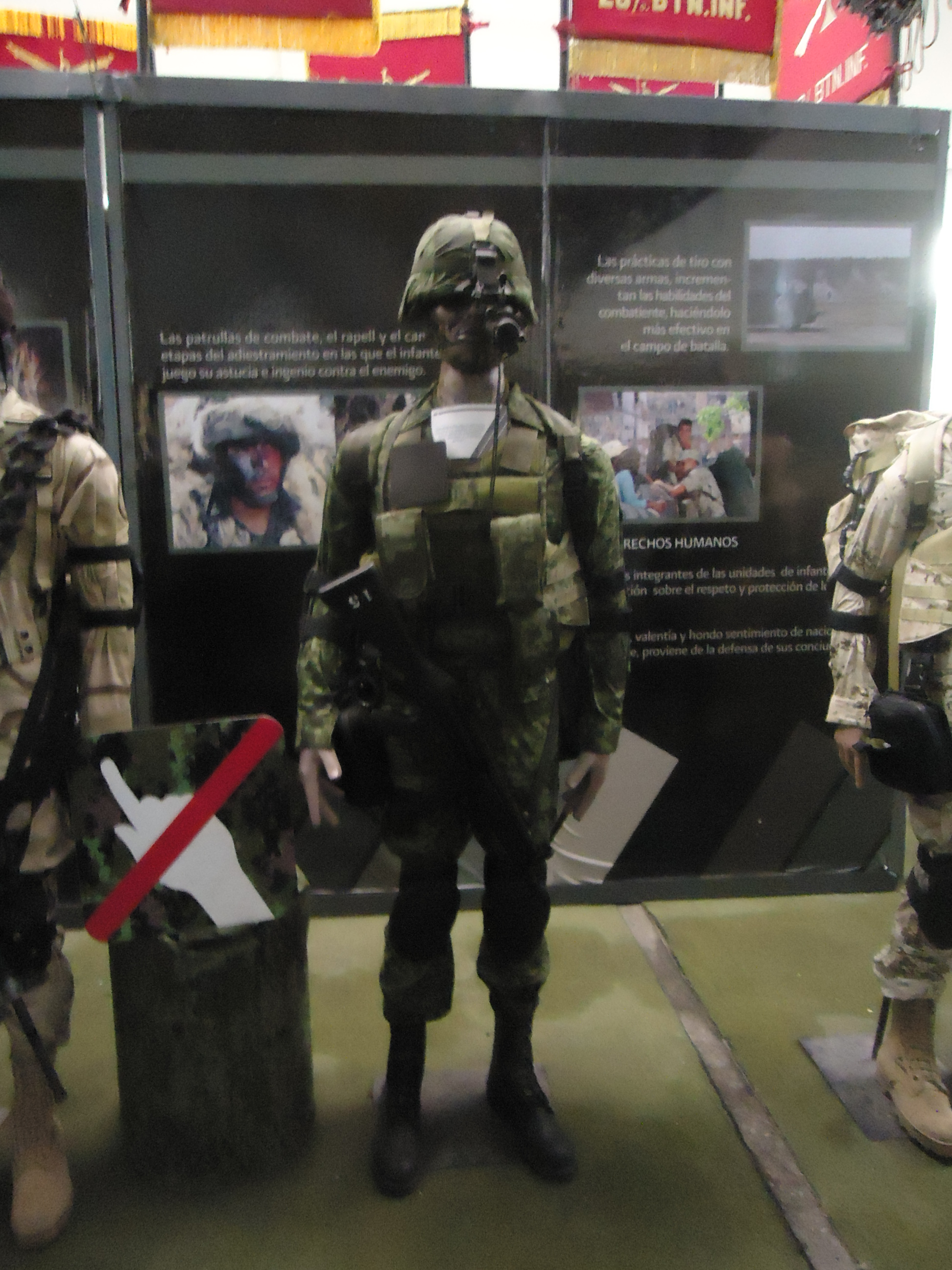
New Mexican army combat kit, including new uniform (“Trans Jungle” woodland camouflage pattern)

=== Vehicles ===
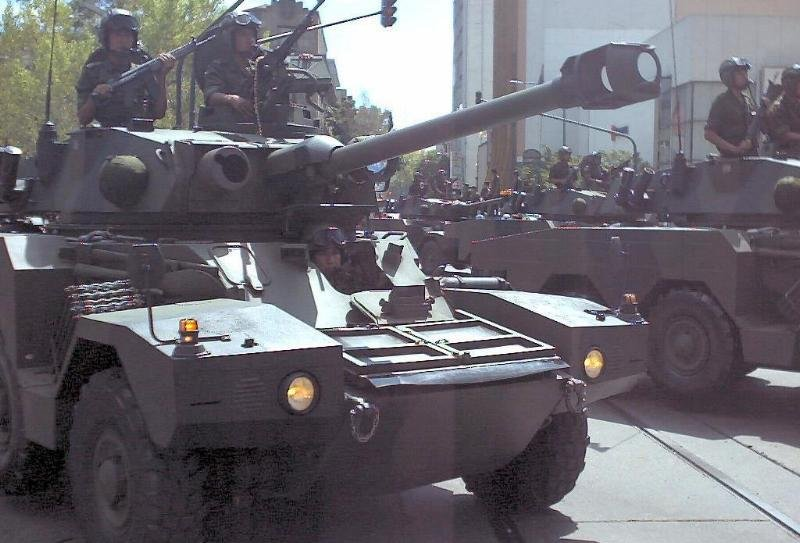
Mexican Army ERC 90 F1 Lynx during the Independence day Parade

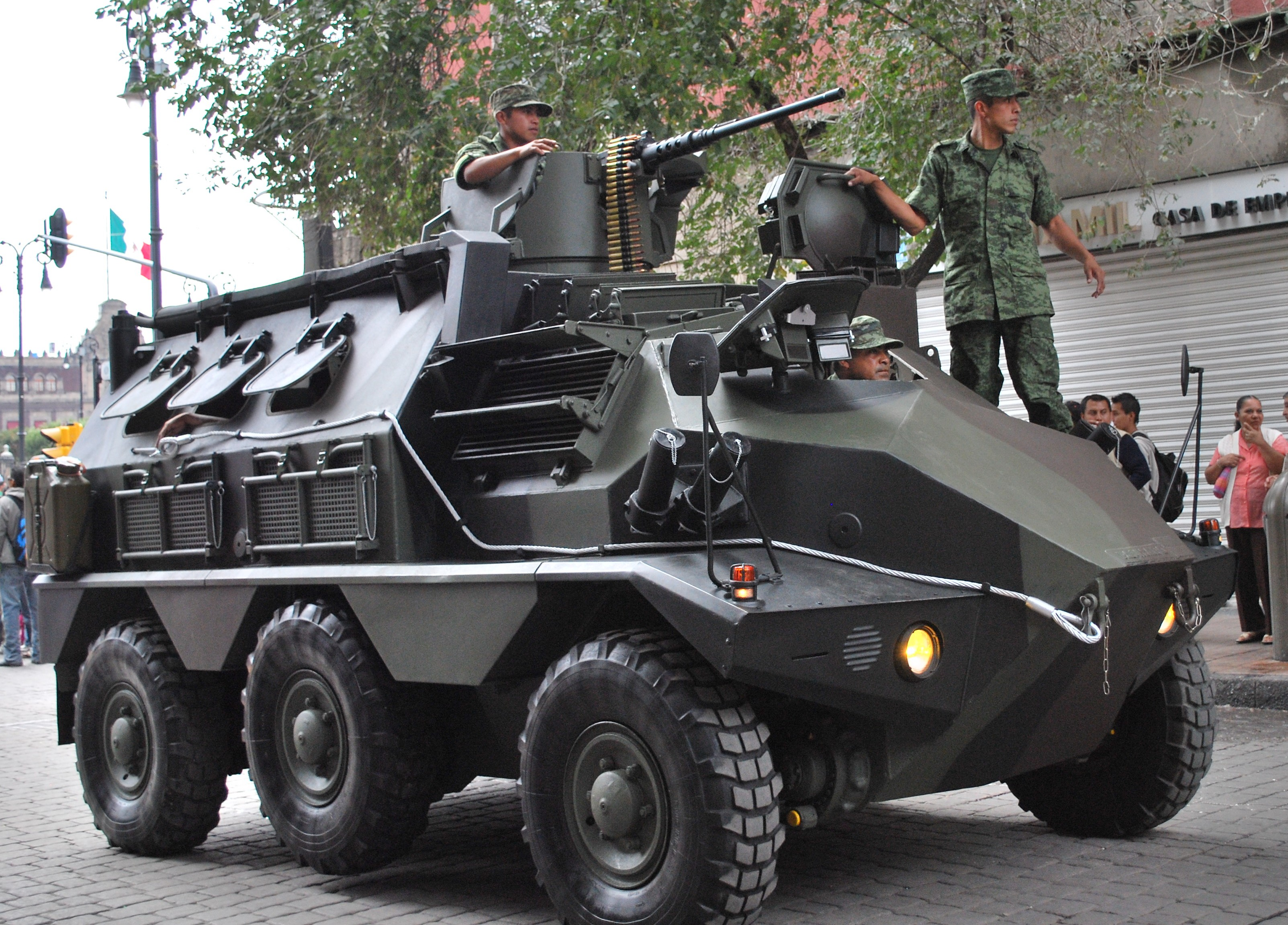
VCR-TT 6X6 APC on Madero Street in downtown Mexico City after Independence Day celebrations

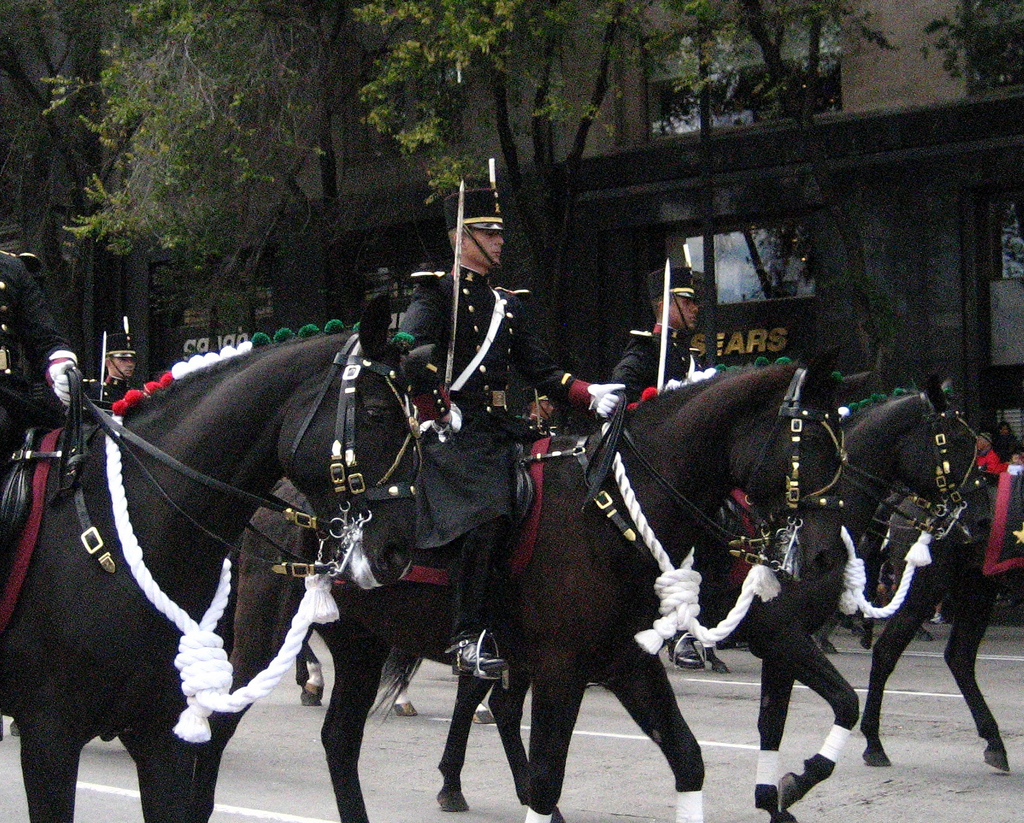
Mexican cavalry

Mexican Army vehicle inventory
Vehicle/system	Type	Versions	Origin	Quantity
Armored fighting vehicles
Panhard ERC 90	Reconnaissance vehicle	ERC 90 F1 Lynx, Armed with 90 mm F1 cannon	France	120 in active service (105 to be upgraded)
DN-V Bufalo	Self-propelled artillery	Armed with 75 mm M8 howitzer	Mexico	Unknown quantity in active service
DN mortar carrier	Mortar carrier	Armed with 81 mm mortar	Mexico	Unknown quantity in active service
M8 Greyhound	Armoured car	Small numbers modernized with a 20 mm cannon installed	United States	Less than 10 in active service, all modernized
DN-IV Caballo	Reconnaissance vehicle	Armed with 20 mm automatic cannon	Mexico	Very few in active service
DN-3	Reconnaissance vehicle	Armed with .50cal Browning MG	Mexico	Very few in active service
DN-V Toro	Reconnaissance vehicle	Armed with 20 mm automatic	Mexico	340 in active service
Max Mex-1	Armoured car	Armed With 20 mm automatic cannon	United States; Mexico	Around 50–55 in active service
Sedena 8x8 vehicle	Infantry fighting vehicle	Armed with possibly a 40 mm cannon, of unknown type	Mexico	1 prototype in active service, possible in production.
Sedena-Henschel HWK -13	Infantry fighting vehicle	HWK-13 (IFV) Armed with 20 mm automatic cannon	Mexico; West Germany	Only one built in 1980
Sedena-Henschel HWK-11	Armored personnel carrier	HWK-11 (APC Version) Armed With one 7.62 mm machine gun, all modernized	Mexico; West Germany	52 in active service (including 12 delivered from Germany in 1964)
AMX-VCI	Armored personnel carrier	DNC-1: upgraded by SEDENA armed with 20 mm cannon	France; Upgraded by Mexico	409 in active service
Panhard VCR	Armored personnel carrier	VCR-TT, Armed with M2 Browning 12.7 mm machine gun	France	46 in active service
DNC-2	Armored personnel carrier	Armed with one 7.62 mm machine gun	Mexico	Unknown quantity in active service, still in production.
El Cimarron	Armored personnel carrier	Armed with M2 Browning 12.7 mm machine gun	Mexico	Unknown quantity in active service, but in production
Cimarrón II	Armored personnel carrier	The Cimarrón II can support a single 12.7 mm machine gun.	Mexico	Unknown quantity in active service, but in production
Artillado (vehículo de combate improvisado) [es]	Troop transport/Armed utility	Different variants involving armed versions capable of supporting a single 7.62 mm machine gun (with a gunner shield) involving Ford F-Series/Dodge Ram. Some can also be modified with extra benches on the bed to allow for troop transport.	United States Mexico	Unknown quantity in active service.
Véhicule Blindé Léger	Scout car	VBL MILAN	France	40 in active service
Oshkosh Sand Cat	Light armored vehicle	The Mexican Army operates the TPV Sandcat Variant and the MX variant of the Sandcat	Israel; United States Mexico	300 in active service
DN-XI	Light armored vehicle	The DN-XI is a Mexican designed armored van based on a Ford truck chassis. 100 on order. 1,000 to be acquired by 2018. Armed with M2 Browning 12.7 mm machine gun or 40 mm automatic grenade launcher or by choice, a SARAF BALAM 1 [es] (RWS) to control those armaments remotely.	Mexico	1,000+ in active service still in production
Kitam I	Light armored vehicle	The Kitam I can support a single 12.7 mm machine gun, or a 7.62 mm machine gun.	Mexico	1 active prototype
Kitam II [es]	Light armored vehicle	The Kitam II can support a single 12.7 mm machine gun, or a 7.62 mm machine gun.	Mexico	2 active prototypes
Ocelotl	Armored personnel carrier	The Ocelotl can support a single 12.7 mm machine gun, a 7.62 mm machine gun, or a 40 mm grenade launcher.	United Arab Emirates	340 in active service
DN-VI	Reconnaissance vehicle	Armed with one 7.62 mm machine gun	Mexico	Unknown, but few in active service
Humvee	Military light utility vehicle/armoured car	HMMWV Armored Car Versions are armed with single M2 Browning 12.7 mm machine gun or 40 mm automatic grenade launcher.	United States 3,335 order in 2014 + 2,200 order more in 2016.	5,535 in active service (including light utility and armored car versions). There are active efforts to replace older units.
Holkan	Military light utility	The Holkan can support a single 12.7 mm machine gun, or a 40 mm automatic grenade launcher	Mexico	Unkown quantity. There are currently plans to acquire 1,200 units
Infantry transport vehicles
Chevrolet Silverado	Pickup truck	GMT900	United States; Mexico	In service
Ford F-Series	Pickup truck	F-150	United States; Mexico	In service
Dodge Ram	Pickup truck	Variants of 4x4 and 6x6	United States	In service
Yamaha Rhino	Utility terrain vehicle	Rhino	Japan	In service
Chevrolet Cheyenne	Pickup truck	GMT K2XX	United States	In service
Jeep Wrangler (JK)	SUV	4×4	United States	In service
Trucks
M520 Goer	Heavy tactical truck	M520	United States	In service
Freightliner Trucks	Truck	M2	United States	In service
M35 2-1/2 ton cargo truck	Military truck	M35	United States	In service
DINA S.A.	Trucks	S-Series / D-Series	Mexico	In service
Mercedes-Benz	Truck	L-Series	Germany	In service
Chevrolet	Truck	Kodiak	United States	In service
Freightliner Trucks	Satellite communications truck	Intelligence	United States	In service

=== Infantry weapons ===
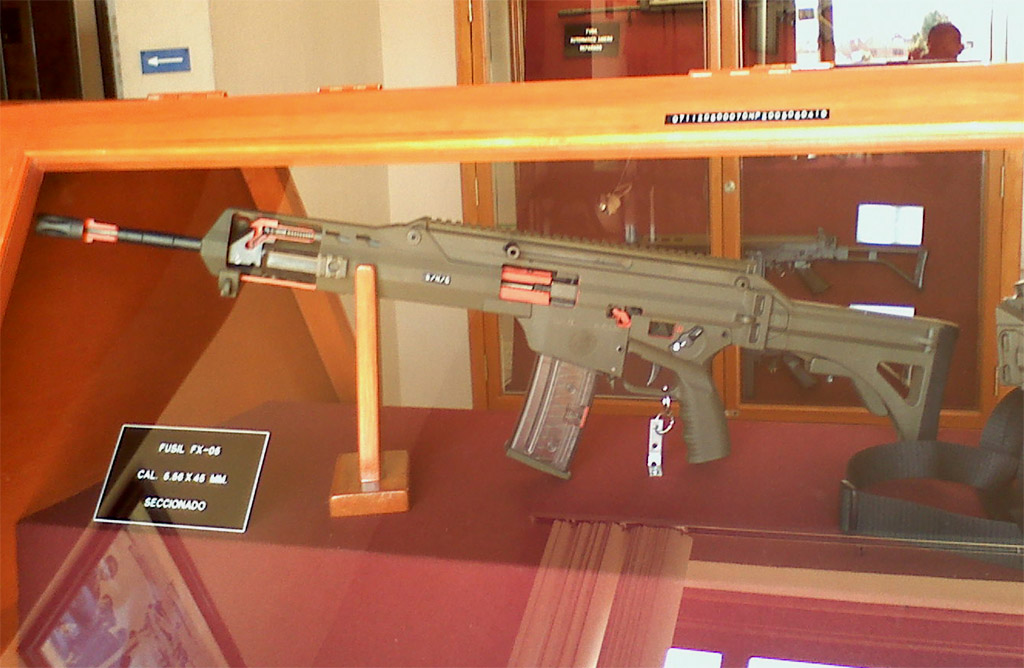
FX-05 Xiuhcoatl (Fire Serpent) assault rifle

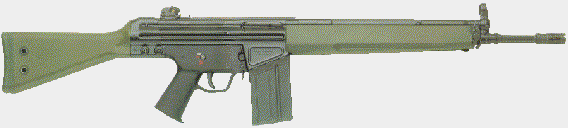
G3A3 battle rifle

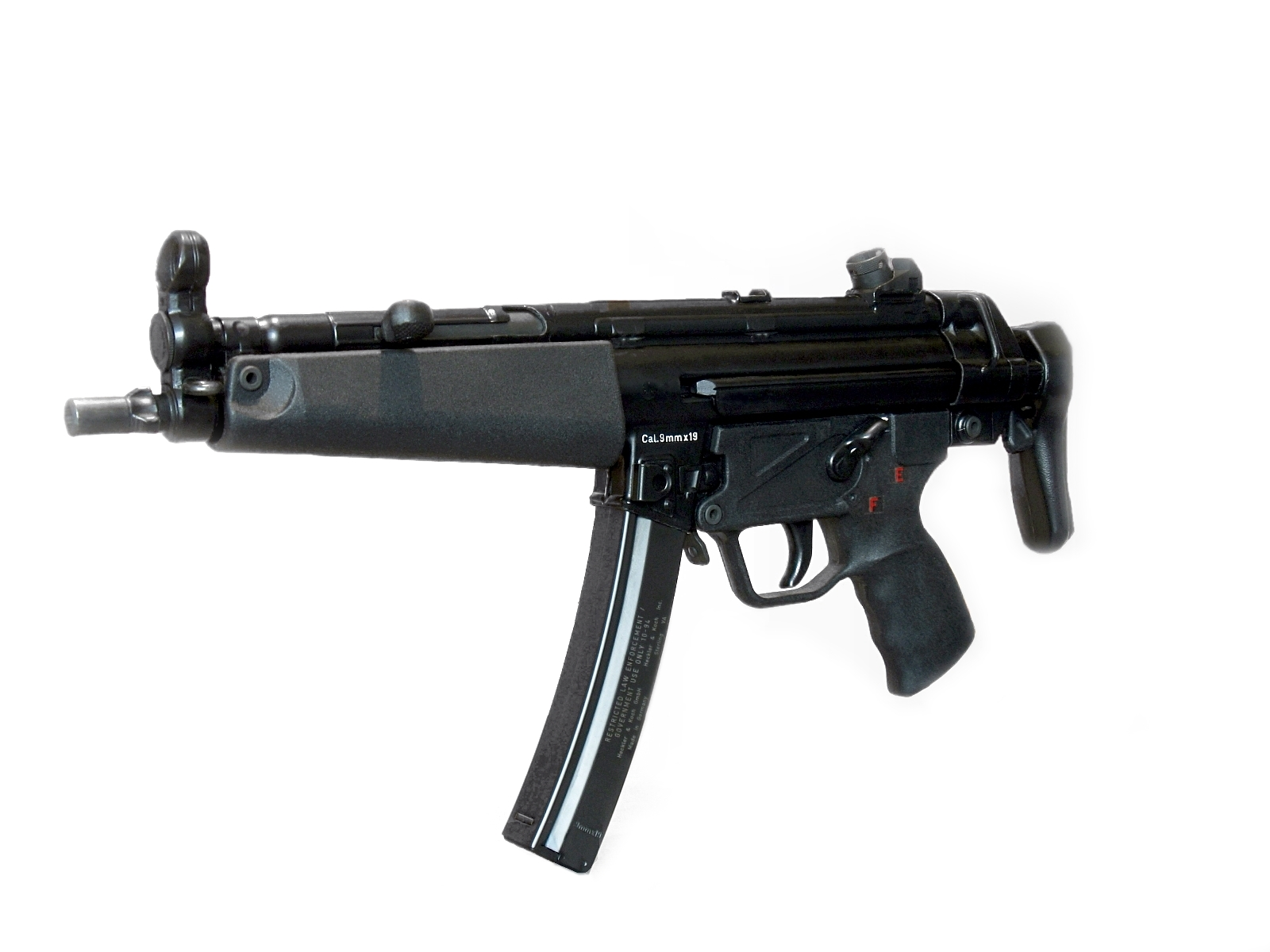
MP5

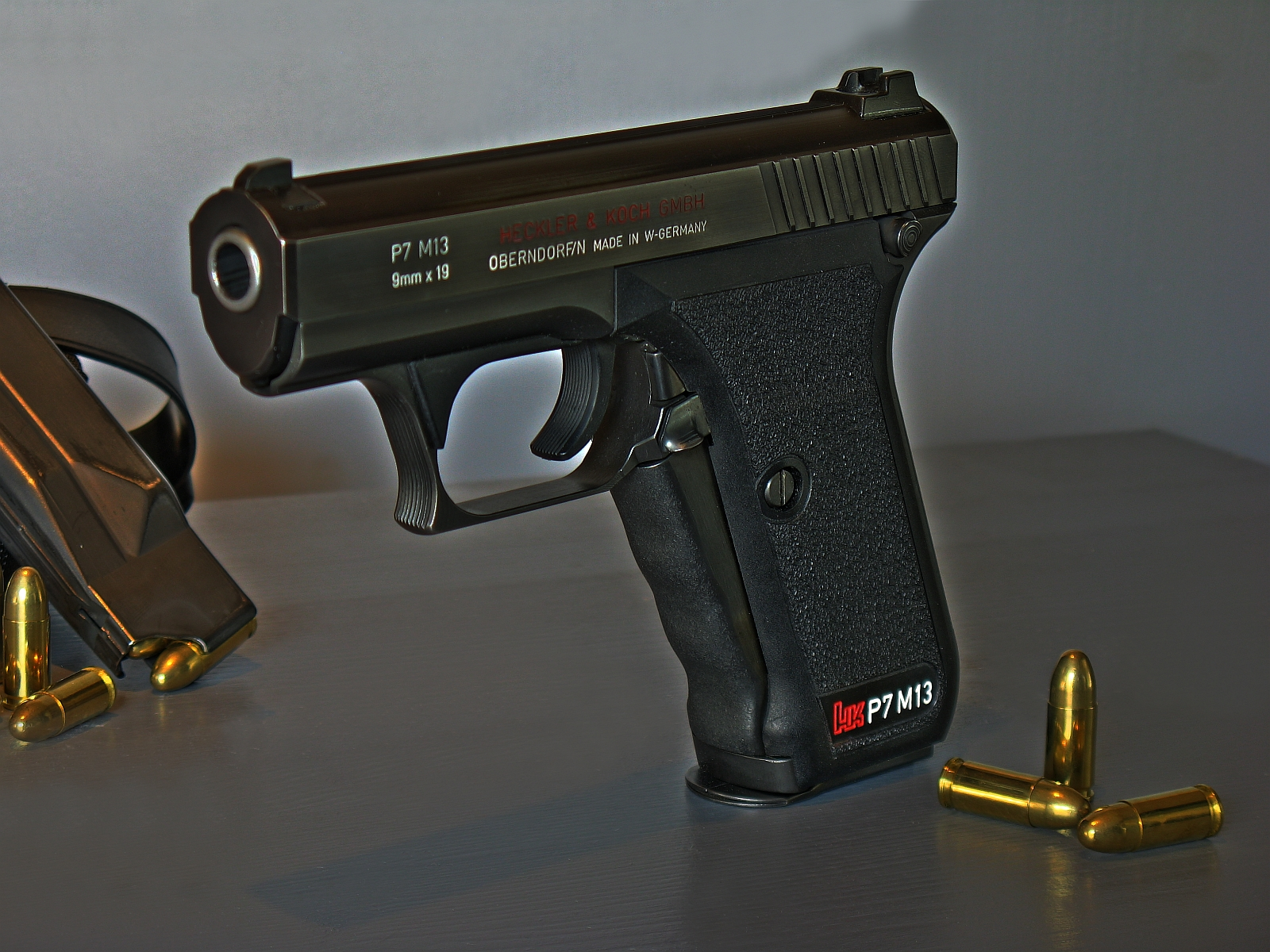
P7M13

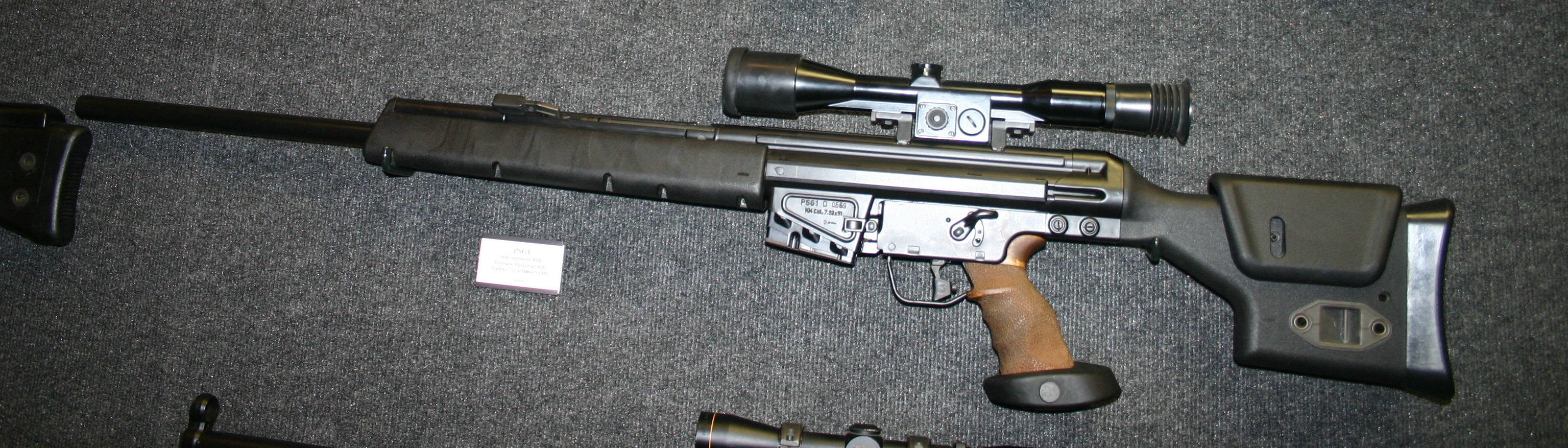
PSG1

Inventory
Name	Caliber	Type	Origin
Heckler & Koch G3	7.62×51 mm NATO	Battle rifle. Made under license from Heckler & Koch, being replaced by the FX-05 Xiuhcoatl Rifle	West Germany
FX-05 Xiuhcoatl	5.56×45 mm NATO	Assault rifle, Carbine, short-carbine rifle and light machine gun depending on version, this rifle is the standard Mexican Army service rifle.	Mexico
Heckler & Koch HK33	5.56×45 mm NATO	Assault rifle. Made under license from Heckler & Koch	West Germany
M4 carbine	5.56×45 mm NATO	Assault rifle and carbine rifle	United States
Heckler & Koch MP5	9×19 mm Parabellum	Submachine gun. Made under license from Heckler & Koch	West Germany
SAX-200 Xiuhcóatl	5.56×45 mm NATO	Submachine gun produced and designed in Mexico.	Mexico
FN P90	5.7×28 mm	Personal defence weapon	Belgium
Mendoza HM-3	9×19 mm Parabellum and .380 ACP	Submachine gun, made and designed in Mexico by Productos Mendoza.	Mexico
M1911	.45 ACP	Semi-automatic pistol	United States; Mexico
Pistola Mexicana Xiuhcóatl	9×19 mm	Semi-automatic pistol	Mexico
Heckler & Koch P7	9×19 mm Parabellum	Semi-automatic pistol. Made under license from Heckler & Koch	Germany
SIG Sauer P226	9×19 mm Parabellum	Semi-automatic pistol	West Germany; Switzerland
Beretta 92FS	9×19 mm Parabellum	Semi-automatic pistol	Italy
FN Five-seveN	5.7×28 mm	Semi-automatic pistol	Belgium
HK PSG1 Morelos Bicentenario	7.62×51 mm NATO	Sniper rifle. Made under license from Heckler & Koch	West Germany; Germany
Barrett M82	.50 BMG	Anti-material rifle	Australia; United States
M249	5.56×45 mm NATO	Light machine gun	Belgium; United States
ALX – (7.62 mm light machine gun)	7.62×51 mm NATO	Light machine gun (still in development)	Mexico
FN Minimi	5.56×45 mm NATO	Light machine gun	Belgium
Heckler & Koch HK21	7.62×51 mm NATO	General-purpose machine gun. Made under license from Heckler & Koch	West Germany; Germany
Rheinmetall MG 3	7.62×51 mm NATO	General-purpose machine gun. Made under license from Rheinmetall	West Germany Germany
M2 Browning machine gun	.50 BMG	Heavy machine gun	United States
M-134 minigun	7.62×51 mm NATO	Rotary machinegun	United States
AGX16	5.56×45 mm NATO	Rotary machinegun	Mexico
Mk 19	40×53 mm	Automatic grenade launcher	United States
Milkor MGL	40×46 mm	Grenade launcher	South Africa; South Africa
M203 grenade launcher	40×46 mm	Grenade launcher	United States
Heckler & Koch AG-C/GLM	40×46 mm	Grenade launcher	Germany
M67 grenade	64 mm	Hand grenade	United States
Mondragón F-08	7×57 mm Mauser	Semi-automatic rifle used for ceremonial occasions, now being retired	Mexico
Winchester Model 54	7.62×51 mm	Bolt-action rifle used for ceremonial occasions	United States
CornerShot		Weapon accessory	Israel; United States
Remington 870	12 gauge	Gauge pump-action shotgun used by Army police	United States

=== Anti-drone Systems ===
Name	Type	Origin
Hikvision UAV Jammer	Counter-UAS	China
SkyFend Hunter	Counter-UAS	China
K'iinbal	Counter-UAS	Mexico

An anti-drone drone training system referred to as SODA (Simulador para la Operación de Drones y Antidrones para la Protección de Tropas or Simulator for the Operation of Drones and Anti-drones for the Protection of Troops) is currently being developed by SEDENA.

=== Remote Control Weapon Stations ===
Name	Type	Origin
Saraf Balam I [es]	It can support a 7.62 mm machine gun and a 5.56 mm machine gun.	Mexico
Saraf Balam II	It can support a 12.7 mm machine gun and a 40mm grenade launcher.	Mexico

=== Artillery ===
Name	Type	Versions	Origin	Status
Self-propelled artillery
SDN Humvee	Tank destroyer mounted on Humvee chassis	106 mm	Mexico	In service
Artillery
M101 Howitzer	Towed howitzer	105 mm	United States	In service
OTO Melara Mod 56 Howitzer	Towed howitzer	105 mm	Italy	In service
M90 Norinco	Towed howitzer	105 mm	China	In service
M-56	Towed Howitzer	105 mm	Yugoslavia	In service
M198 Howitzer	Towed howitzer	155 mm	United States	In service
TRF1	Towed howitzer	155 mm	France	In service
M114	Towed howitzer	155 mm	United States	In service
M8 howitzer	Self-propelled howitzer	75 mm	United States; Mexico	In service
Mortier 120 mm Rayé Tracté Modèle F1	Heavy mortar	120 mm	France	In service
Soltam K6	Heavy mortar	120mm	Israel	In service
M30 mortar	Heavy mortar	106mm	United States	In service
M29 mortar	Medium mortar	81mm	United States	In service
M1 mortar	Medium mortar	81mm	United States	In service
Mortero 81	Medium mortar	81mm	Mexico	In service
Brandt 60 mm LR Gun-mortar	Light mortar	60mm	France	In service
M2 mortar	Light mortar	60mm	United States	In service
M19	Light mortar	60mm	United States	In service
Mortero 60	Light mortar	60mm	Mexico	In service
Bofors L70	Anti aircraft autocannon	40mm	Sweden	In service
Oerlikon 35 mm twin cannon	Anti aircraft autocannon	35mm	Switzerland	In service
2A45 Sprut	Anti-tank gun	125mm	Soviet Union; Russian Federation	In service

=== Anti-armor weapons ===
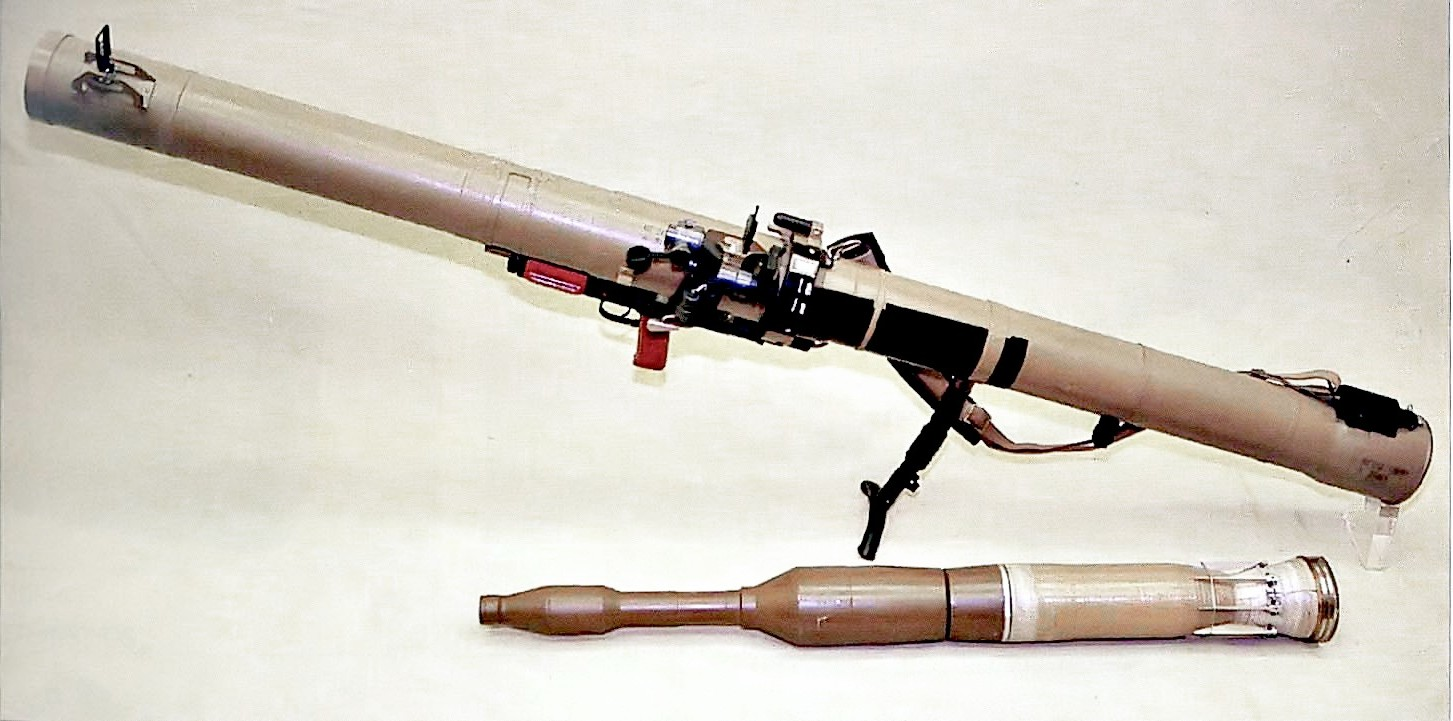
RPG-29 Rocket propelled grenade

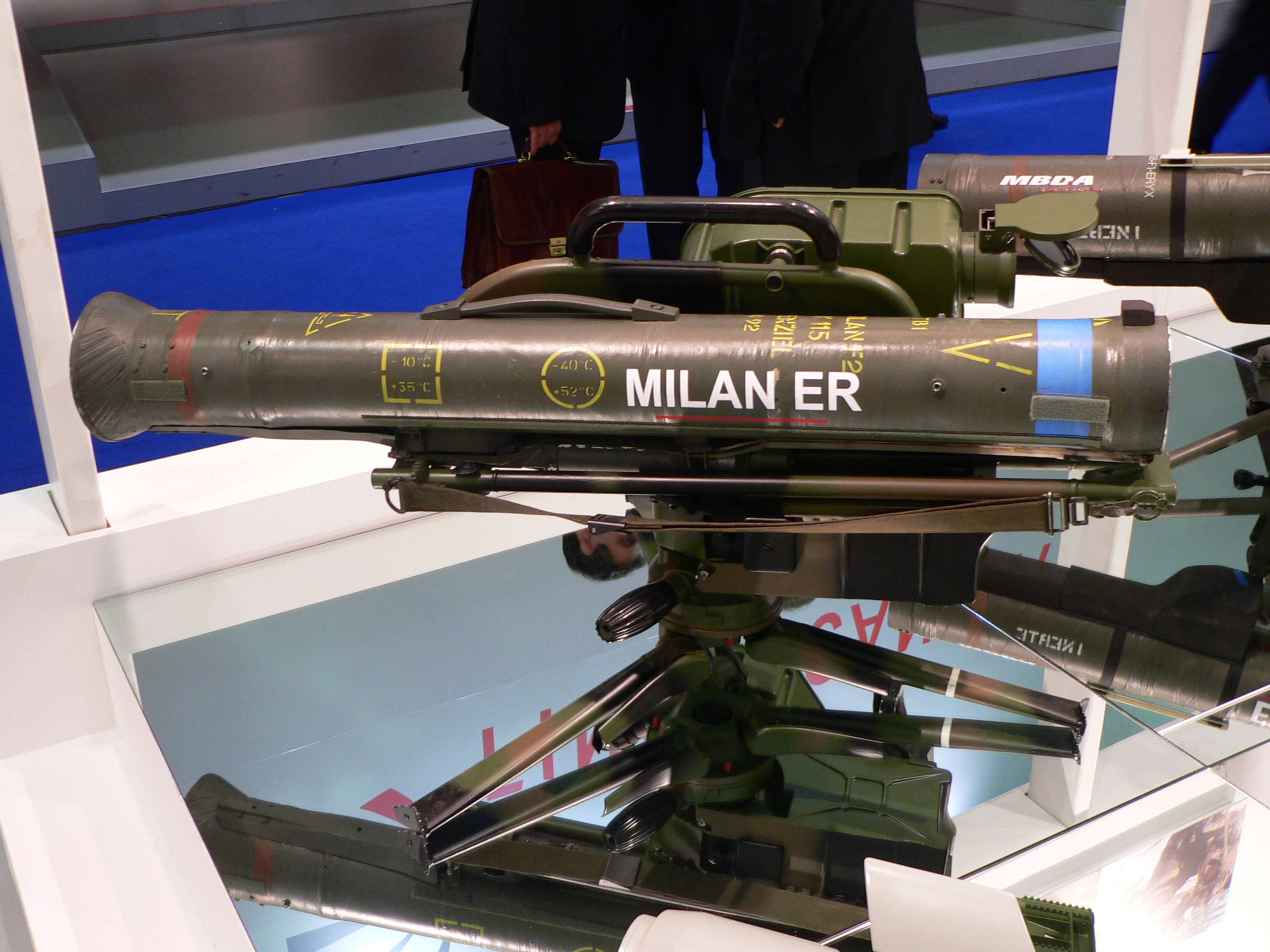
MILAN

Name	Type	Versions	Origin	Information
Anti-tank weapons
Carl Gustaf 8.4cm recoilless rifle	Multi-role recoilless rifle	84 mm	Sweden	In service
RPG-7	Anti-tank rocket	Depends on Warhead	Soviet Union; Russia	In service
SMAW	Anti-tank rocket	105 mm	United States	In service
RPG-29	Anti-tank rocket	105 mm	Soviet Union; Russia Mexico	Locally produced in Mexico by Sedena, in service
Anti-armor recoilless rifles
M40 106 mm recoilless rifle	Recoilless rifle	106 mm	United States	Mounted on Humvees, in service
Anti-tank guided missiles
MILAN	Anti-tank guided missile		France	Mounted on VBL vehicles, in service

== See also ==
- Mexican Navy
- Mexican Air Force
