= Charrería =

National sport of Mexico

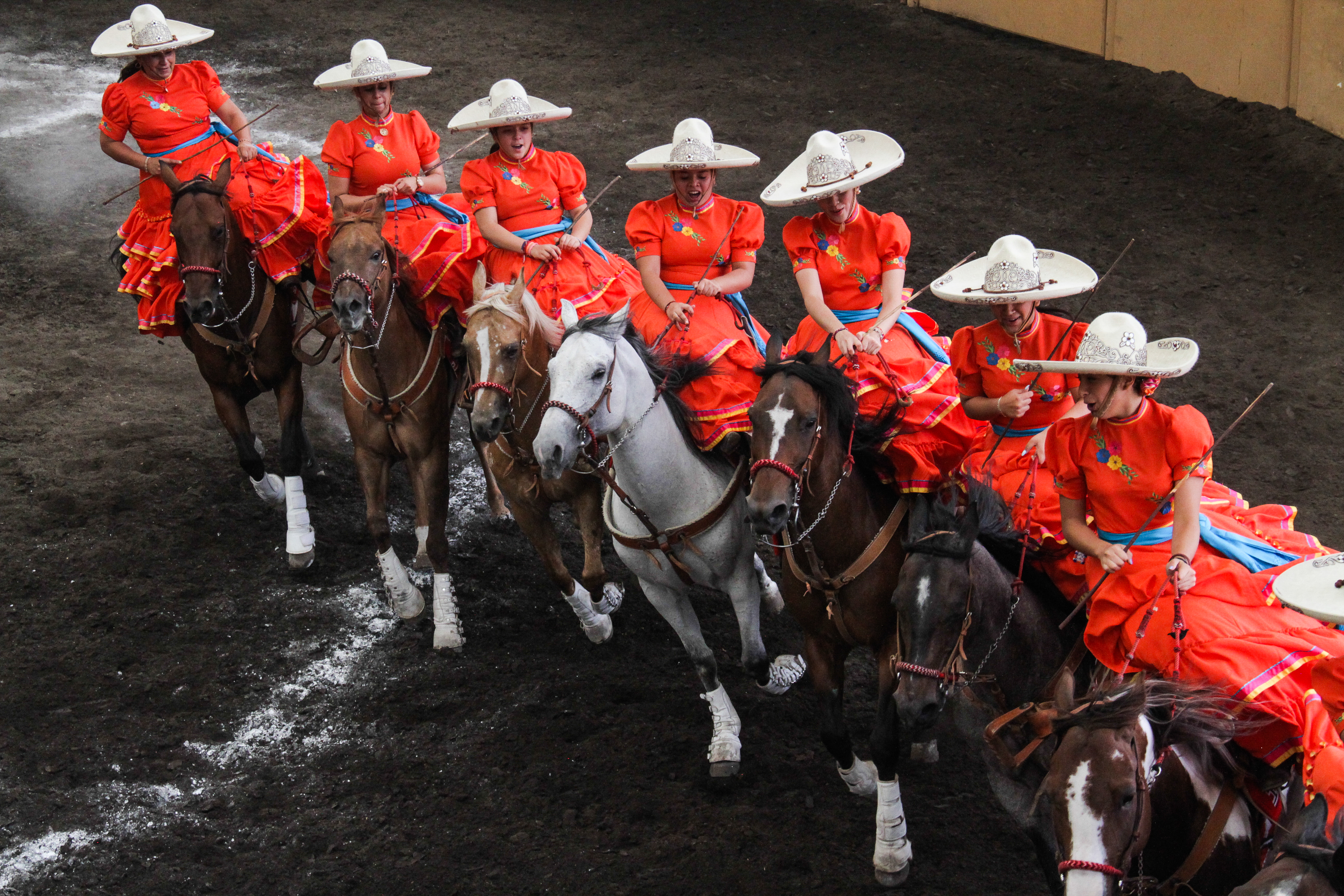
- Female charras or "escaramuzas" in a charrería tournament. Mexico City, 2017.
- Highest governing body: Federación Mexicana de Charrería

Characteristics
- Contact: No
- Type: Equestrianism
- Equipment: Azteca horse
- Venue: Lienzo charro

Presence
- Country or region: Mexico
- Olympic: No
- Paralympic: No

Charrería, equestrian tradition in Mexico
- UNESCO Intangible Cultural Heritage
- Country: Mexico
- Reference: 01108
- Region: Latin America and the Caribbean

Inscription history
- Inscription: 2016 (11th session)
- List: Representative

Charrería (pronounced [tʃareˈɾia]), also known historically as Jaripeo, is the national sport of Mexico and a discipline arising from equestrian activities and livestock traditions used in the haciendas of the Viceroyalty of New Spain.

Evolving from the cattle herding traditions created the 16th century, the first kind of charreria events were ranch work competitions between haciendas. The first shows related to charreria began before the 20th century, but it was not until the Mexican Revolution that its full emergence occurred in Hidalgo and Jalisco when with the Land Reform, charros began to congregate in cities such as Mexico City and other centers, consolidating large associations to maintain tradition and popularity; the most important are the Asociación de Charros de Jalisco A.C, Asociación de Charros de Morelia A.C and Asociación de Charros Regionales de La Villa A.C. Charrería is the national sport of Mexico by excellence and in 2016, and was inscribed in the Representative List of the Intangible Cultural Heritage of Humanity by UNESCO.

== History ==
The origins of Mexican bullfighting and equestrian sports date back to the mid-16th century, shortly after the introduction of cattle and horses. The introduction was successful, as cattle and horses multiplied and spread rapidly throughout the country, that soon after, there were more cattle and horses in Mexico than in Spain.

The first cattle ranching activities centered primarily around the leather and tallow industry, both for export and domestic consumption. In 1587, for example, more than 64,350 cattle hides left the port of Veracruz for the port of Seville. This cattle ranching was carried out by hunting wild bulls with the use of the desjerretadera, a 20-palmos (4.5-meter) lance with a crescent-shaped blade at the end for hamstringing the bulls. A vaquero (cowherd) on horseback, carrying the desjerretadera, would gallop at full speed behind a wild bull and, positioning himself slightly to one side, strike the hock of one of its legs, severing the flesh and sinews, instantly incapacitating it. The vaquero would then dismount and finish off the bull by stabbing it in the neck, then skinning and removing the tallow, leaving the flesh and the rest to rot in the countryside.

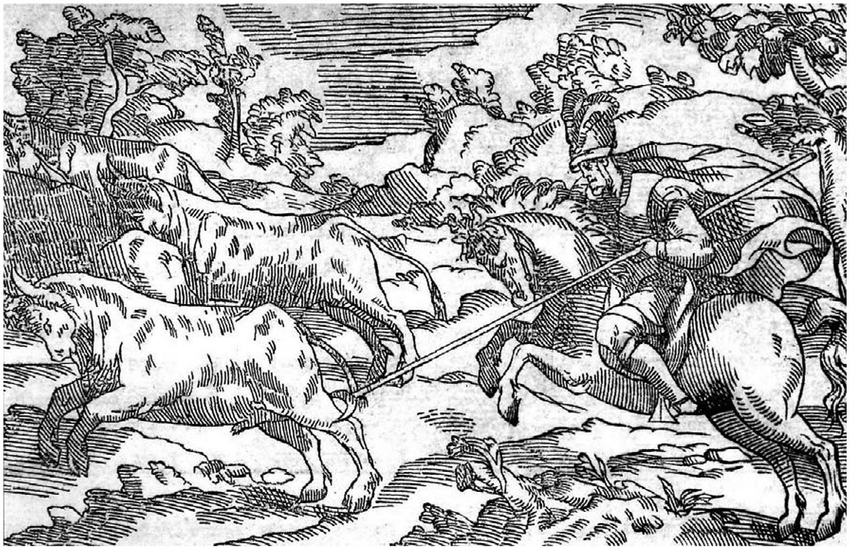
Hunting wild cattle in Colonial Mexico (1582). This was the first Mexican vaquero task turned into sport.

From this New World ranching activity emerged what can be considered the first Mexican bullfighting-equestrian sport. Horsemen, not involved with the vaquero trade, would go out into the countryside with the aforementioned desjarretadera to hunt bulls for simple recreation or enjoyment because, according to them, it made them tough and "strong" or agile in the saddle. As Mexican vaquero culture developed and cattle ranching expanded throughout the 16th and 17th centuries, new vaquero tasks and techniques used for the management of cattle and horses emerged. Vaqueros were tasked with performing various jobs on cattle ranches or haciendas, such as rounding-up wild cattle (rodeos), branding, hunting runaway cattle, sorting cattle for identification, and hunting wild, ownerless bulls and horses.

In his work "Historia del Toreo en México" (1924), historian Nicolás Rangel compiled several complaints to the Holy See about vaqueros accused of "Satanism," including the exploits of a mulatto vaquero on a ranch in Jalisco who was accused in 1604 of having a pact with the devil and wearing his image tattooed on his back, due to his equestrian and vaquero skills. It was said that the aforementioned mulatto would tie his feet tightly and wait for a very feisty bull, then place two oranges on its horns. And on a wild filly, "no matter how much it bucked, riding on it, he would remove its girths and saddle and remain bareback on it, without dismounting or falling." Such risky feats were already, at that time, common skills and recreational sports among the country's vaqueros, but unknown to the Spanish, who attributed them to witchcraft.

By the 18th century, techniques such as bull-tailing, roping, and bronco-busting, although still rudimentary, were commonly used on the country's haciendas during hunts, rodeos and branding celebration. By then, such feats had become recreational traditions, expressions of Mexican bullfighting, deeply rooted in the Mexican population of all classes, both rural and urban. In 1765, Pedro Tamarón Romeral, Bishop of Durango, lashed out at the clergy of those regions who entertained and exercised themselves by tailing bulls in public spaces.

Jineteo de toros, or bull-riding, was also a common tradition in Mexican bullfighting and, like bull-tailing, was deeply rooted among the population. In his work "Rusticatio Mexicana" (1781), the Jesuit Rafael Landivar described, in epic verse, bull riding and how another bull was fought while riding the bull during bullfights in the villages.

=== 19th Century: El Jaripeo ===
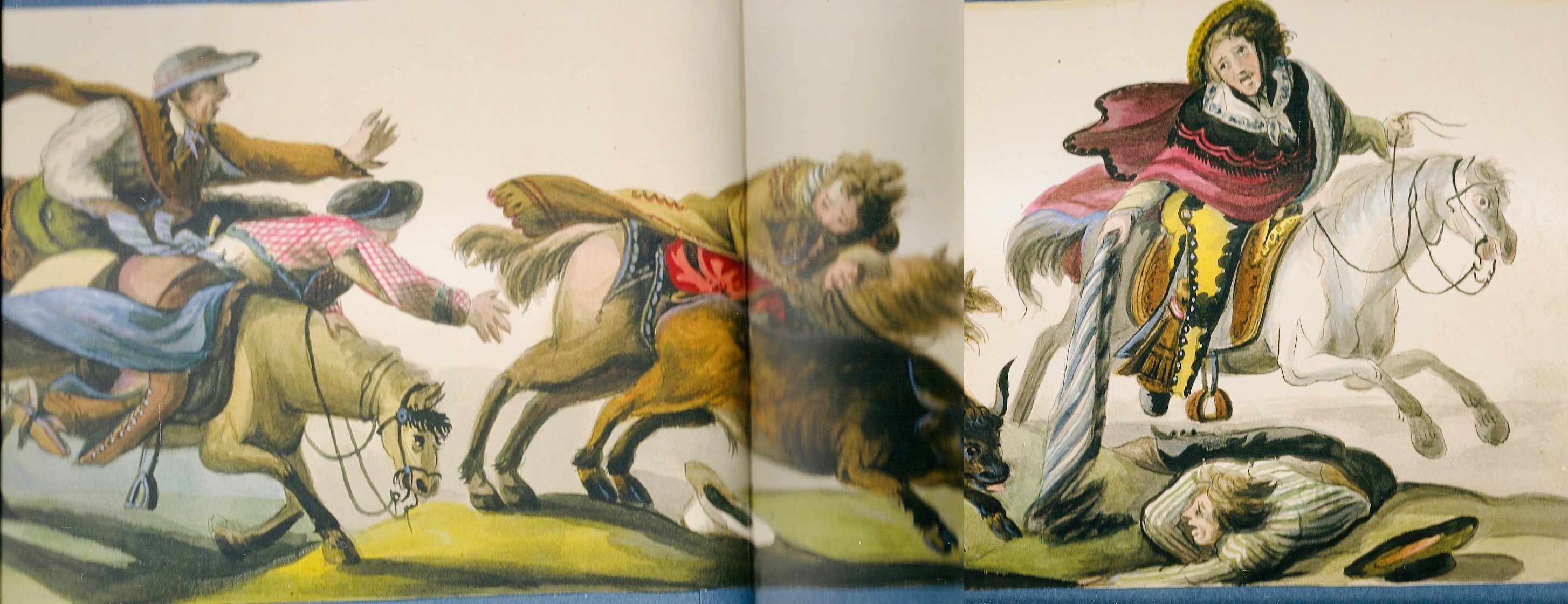
A bull-tailing (coleo) competition on the open range (1825). Bull-tailing, originally a ranching technique, has been a popular sport in Mexico since the 17th century.

Although Mexican bullfighting had been developing since before the 19th century, it was only then that it began to take shape and refine, gaining wider recognition.

Throughout much of Mexico's history, these bullfighting and equestrian sports had been held primarily in the country's countryside and on haciendas, on the open range or small rural arenas, with wild cattle, and rarely appeared in the arenas of large cities, and even then only as secondary events. An article in the English sports journal "The New Sporting Magazine" (1835) describes in great detail the sport of bull-tailing on the open range in the Bajío region, a region considered home to the country's finest horsemen. And the Scottish noblewoman Frances Erskine Inglis described the large country festivities, such as cattle-branding, on the cattle ranches of Hidalgo, and detailed bull-riding, in 1839.

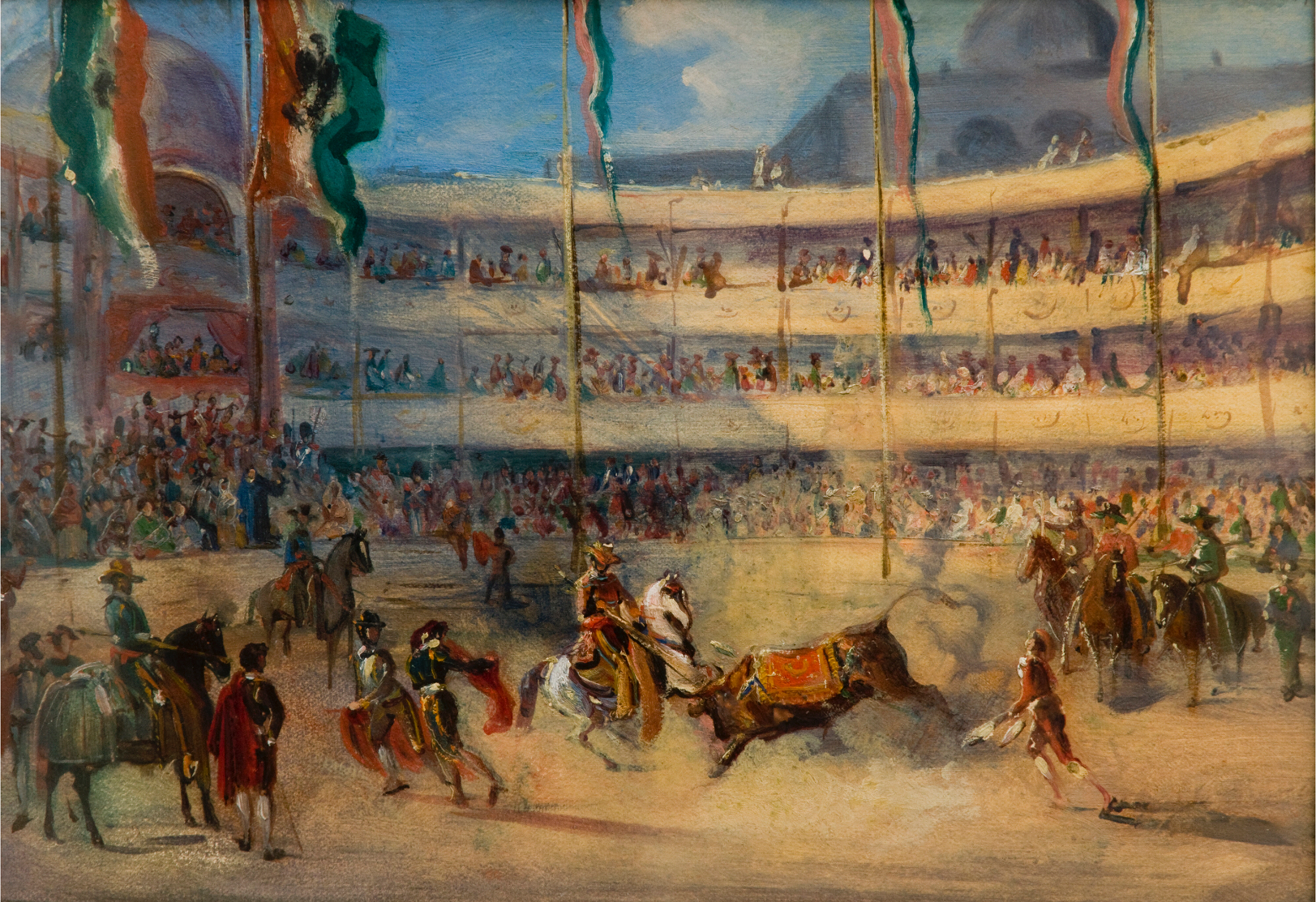
A bullfight in Mexico City (1831), where the picadors are dressed as the vaqueros of the hinterland, the Charros.

Until the 1860s, the bullfighting scene in Mexico, especially in large cities and among the elite, was dominated by the Spanish style. In these cases, Mexican traditions were relegated and minimized, appearing as simple folkloric additions, as auxiliaries, or secondary events. For example, the picadors often came out dressed as the vaqueros from the interior of the country, the charros, instead of in Spanish attire. The charros would assist the bullfighter if he was in danger by roping the bull, or if the bull was not brave enough or not willing enough for the fight, they would rope it to remove it from the arena. Sometimes, bullfights included bull riding as a secondary event to liven up the atmosphere. The only place where people could find Mexican equestrian and cowboy traditions in all their splendor was in the countryside, on haciendas, ranches, and towns.

As a result of the French Intervention in Mexico in the 1860s, a new sense of patriotism and nationalism emerged throughout the country, with both the government and the population promoting the idea of “lo nacional” or "all things Mexican" above all things "foreign." This included Mexican equestrian and bullfighting traditions above those of Spain and Europe. Ironically, it was Emperor Maximilian I of Mexico who, during the French Intervention, promoted and exalted these traditions, popularizing them among the Mexican elite, as he was a great admirer of Mexican horsemanship. He often hosted roping exhibitions, bull riding, and other events at the Palace, where he invited foreign dignitaries, and he would often dressed as a charro even at formal events.

All of this would have an impact in the 1870s and 1880s, when businessmen and cattle-barons promoted Mexican traditions, showcasing Jaripeo, known by the Spaniards as “Toreo Mexicano” or Mexican style Bull-fighting, the collection of equestrian and vaquero skills of the charros. Mexican feats, originally vaquero techniques for handling cattle and horses, including roping, bull-tailing, riding and breaking in bulls and wild horses, reining and horsemanship skills, were elevated to a national level from their humble rural and ranching origins.

In his work "La Tauromaquia" (1895), the Spanish bullfighting writer and journalist Leopoldo Vázquez, who witnessed the exploits of the famed charro Ponciano Díaz in 1889, recounted:

“Jaripeo — This name is given in Mexico to the different types of bullfighting on horseback, which are performed with singular skill and great mastery by many of the bullfighters of that country in the regional bullfighting circuses, which differ little from those of the same kind that they perform in the countryside, and which we previously mentioned. Among them are the lassoing, tailing and knocking down bulls from horseback, the riding of bulls, rejoneo, banderillear (putting banderillas from horseback ), and bullfighting on horseback as well.”

The original “suertes” or feats of Jaripeo or Charreria were:

- Coleo (Bull-tailing): This involves bringing down a bull on horseback by grabbing its tail and pulling it to bring it down.
- Lassoing: This involves lassoing bulls by the horns or neck; the most skilled only lasso the horns; and neck-lassoing horses.
- Manganear (fore-foooting): This involves roping the "hands”, or forelegs, of a bull or horse to bring it down.
- Apealar (heeling): This involves roping the hind legs of a bull or horse to bring it down.
- Bull-riding: This involved mounting and riding the bull after it had been lassoed by the horns or neck and roped, either by its hind legs or forelegs.
- Riding bronco horses (wild horses): This consisted of riding a bronco horse bareback without reins or a harness, holding only the mane.
- Barbear (bull wrestling): This consisted of confronting the bull on foot, grabbing its ear with one hand and its snout with the other, and thus twisting its neck to knock it down.
- Banderillas a caballo (to put banderillas from horseback): This consisted of placing banderillas on the bull (typically done on foot) from horseback.
- Capotear or Capear toros a caballo (bullfighting with the capote from horseback) : This consisted of fighting a bull with a capote (cloak, cape) or serape, but from horseback.
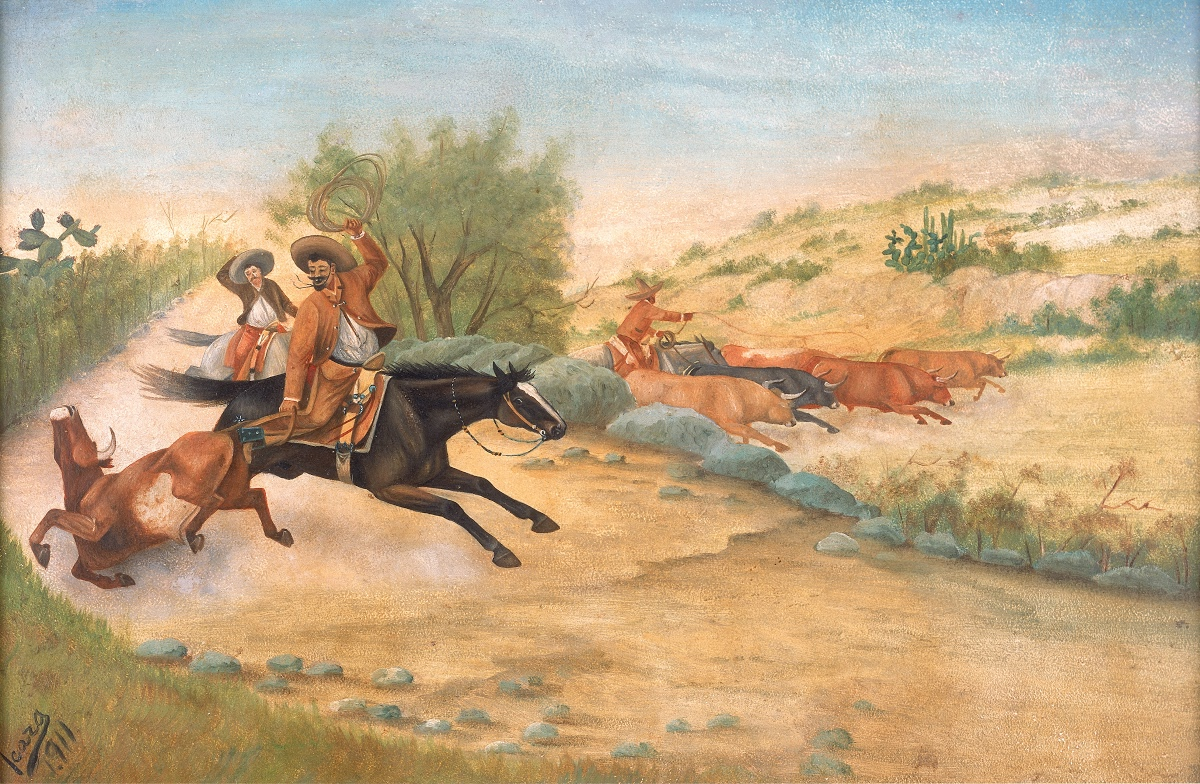
Tailing a Bull.

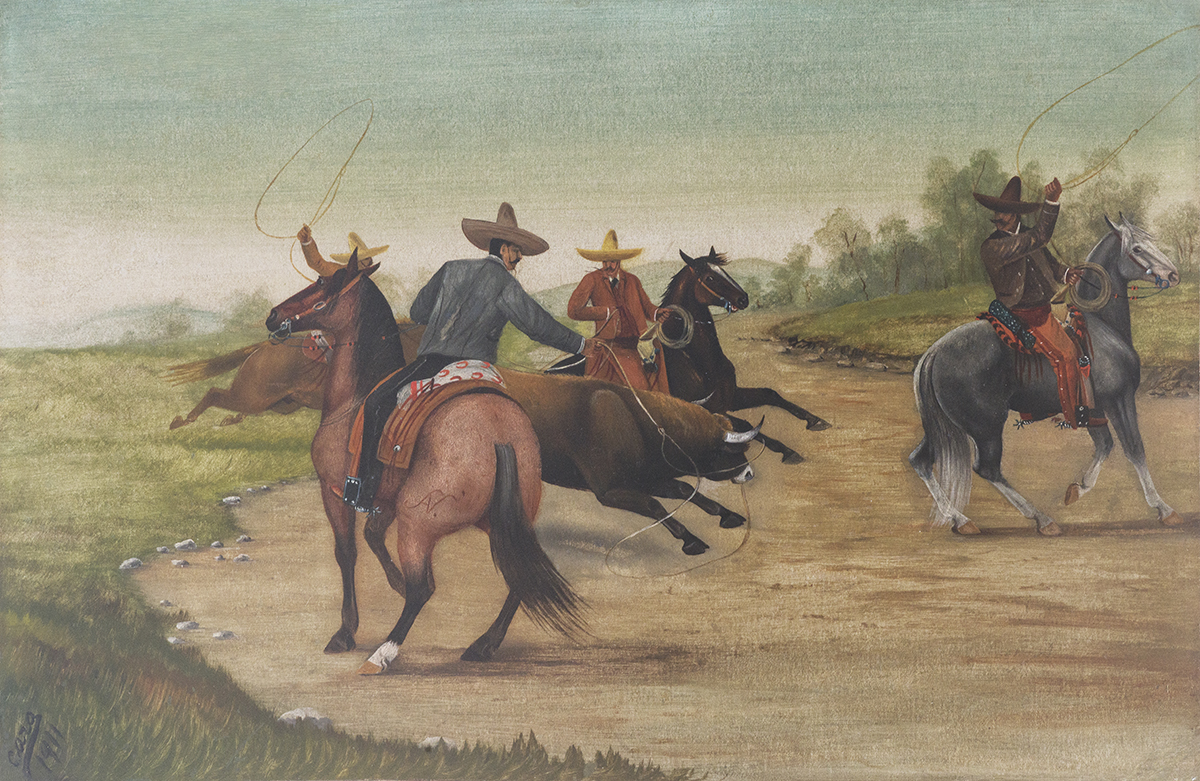
Manganeando (forefooting) a bull.

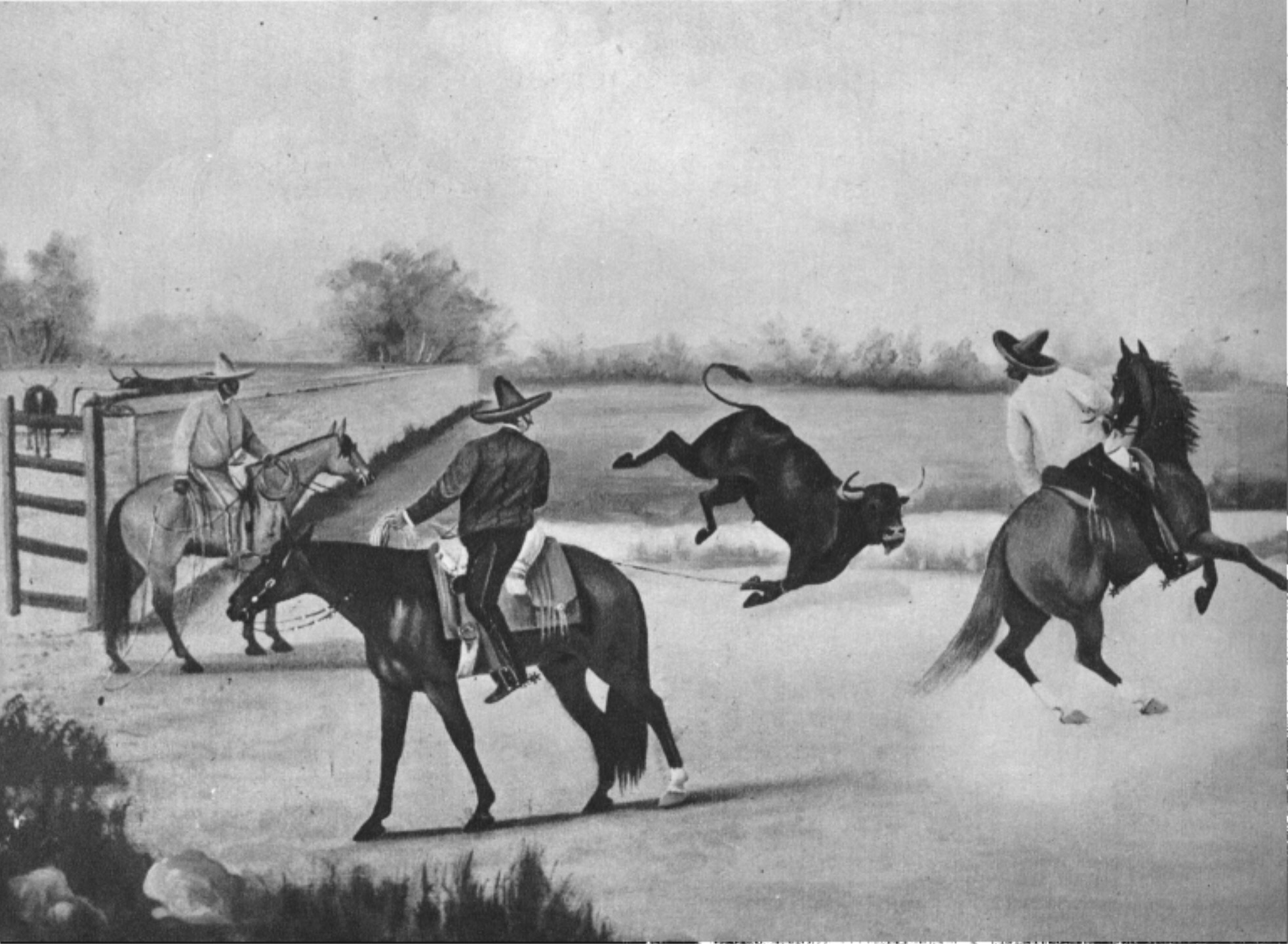
Executing the mangana.

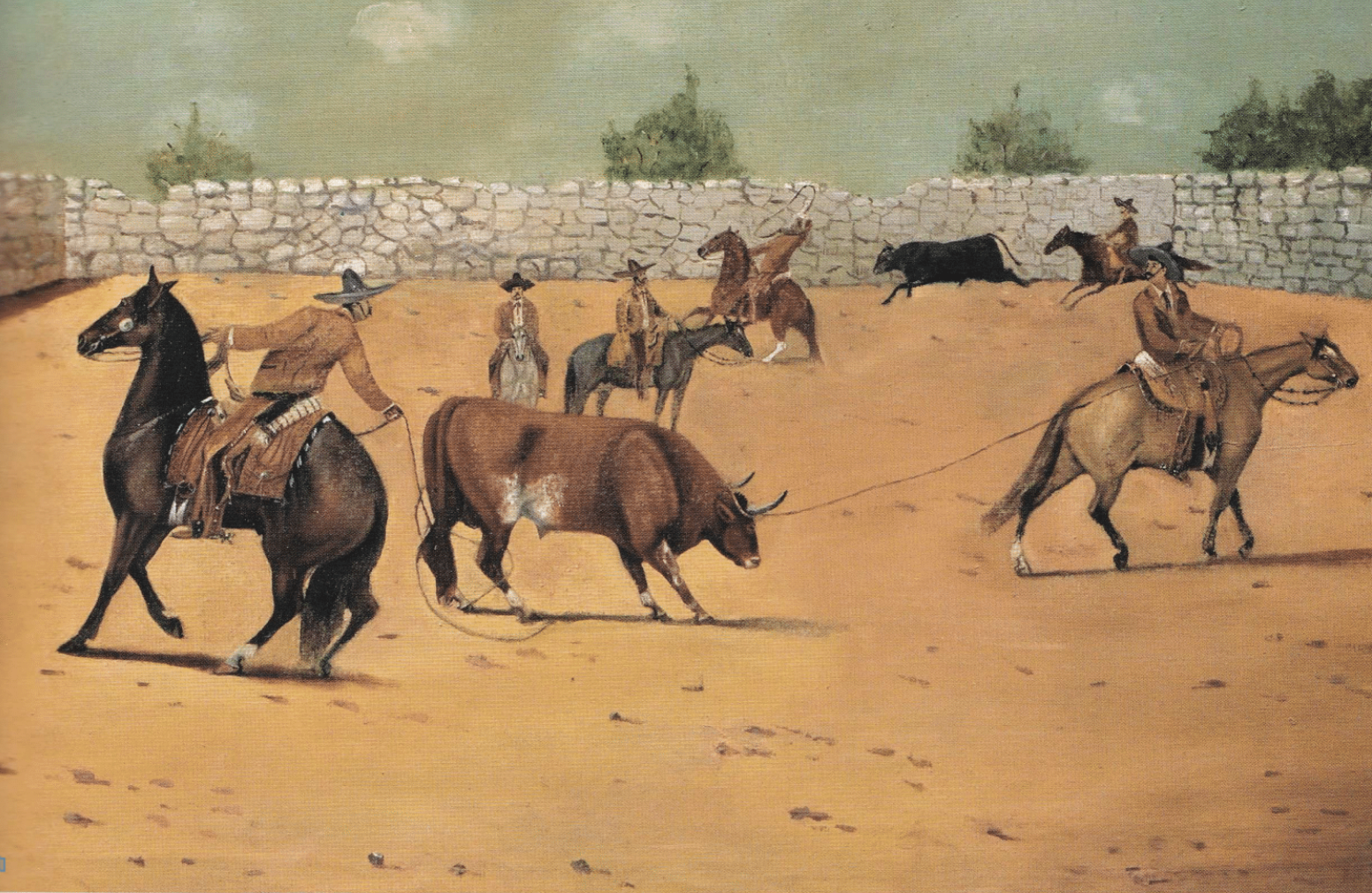
Apealando (heeling) a bull.

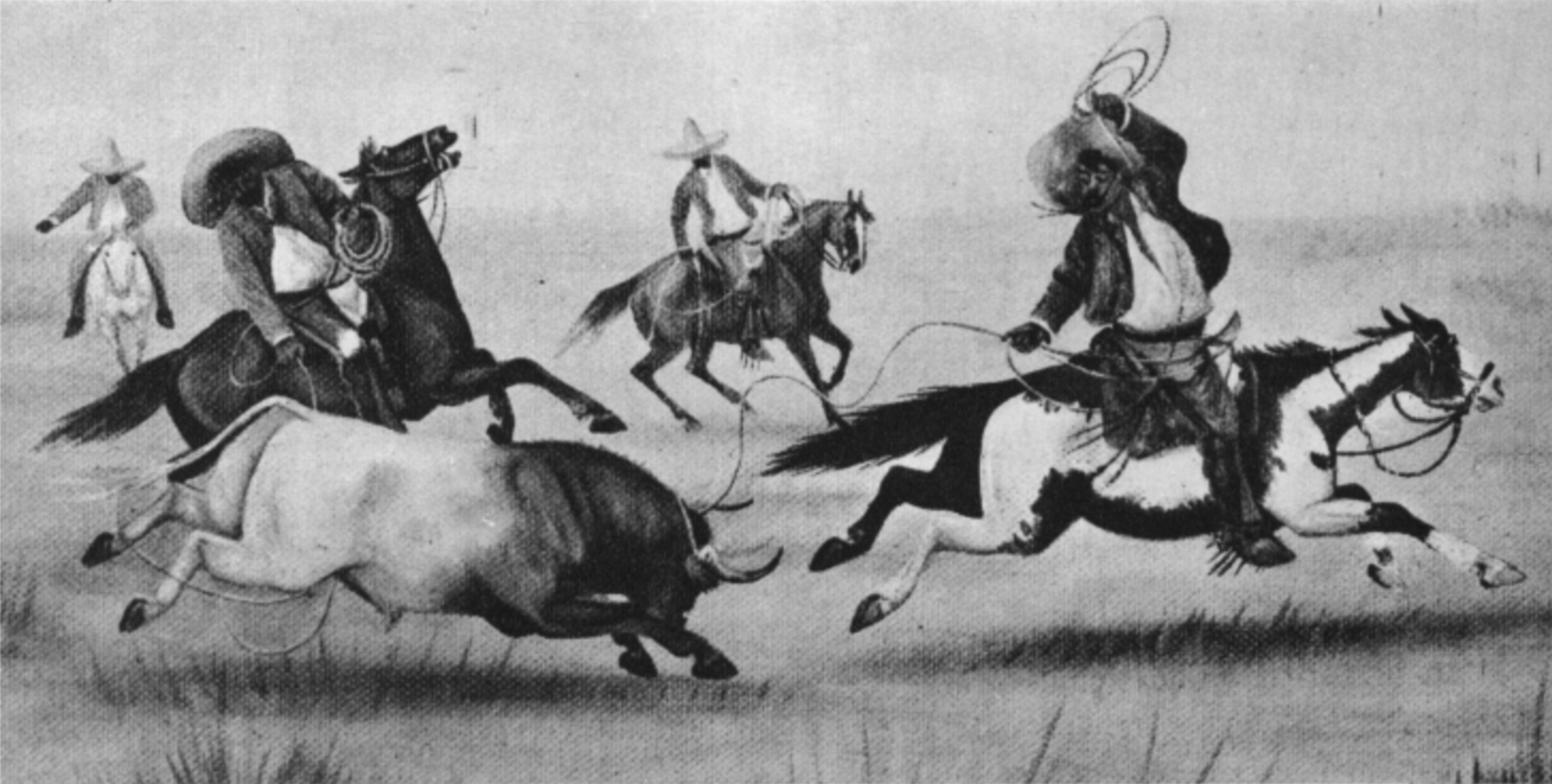
Lassoing and heeling a wild bull on the open range (team roping).

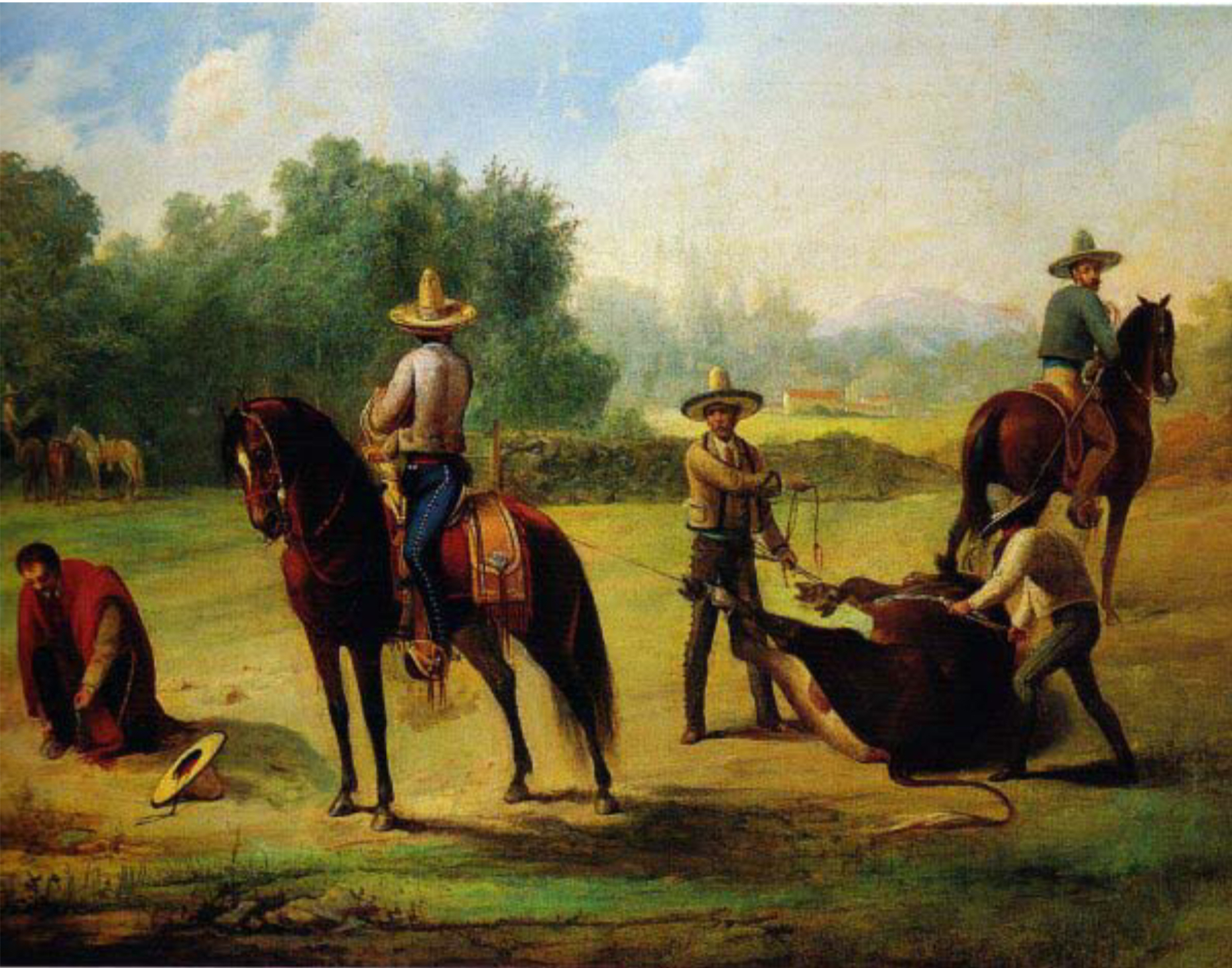
Bull roped by the head and its hind legs, ready to be mounted and ridden.

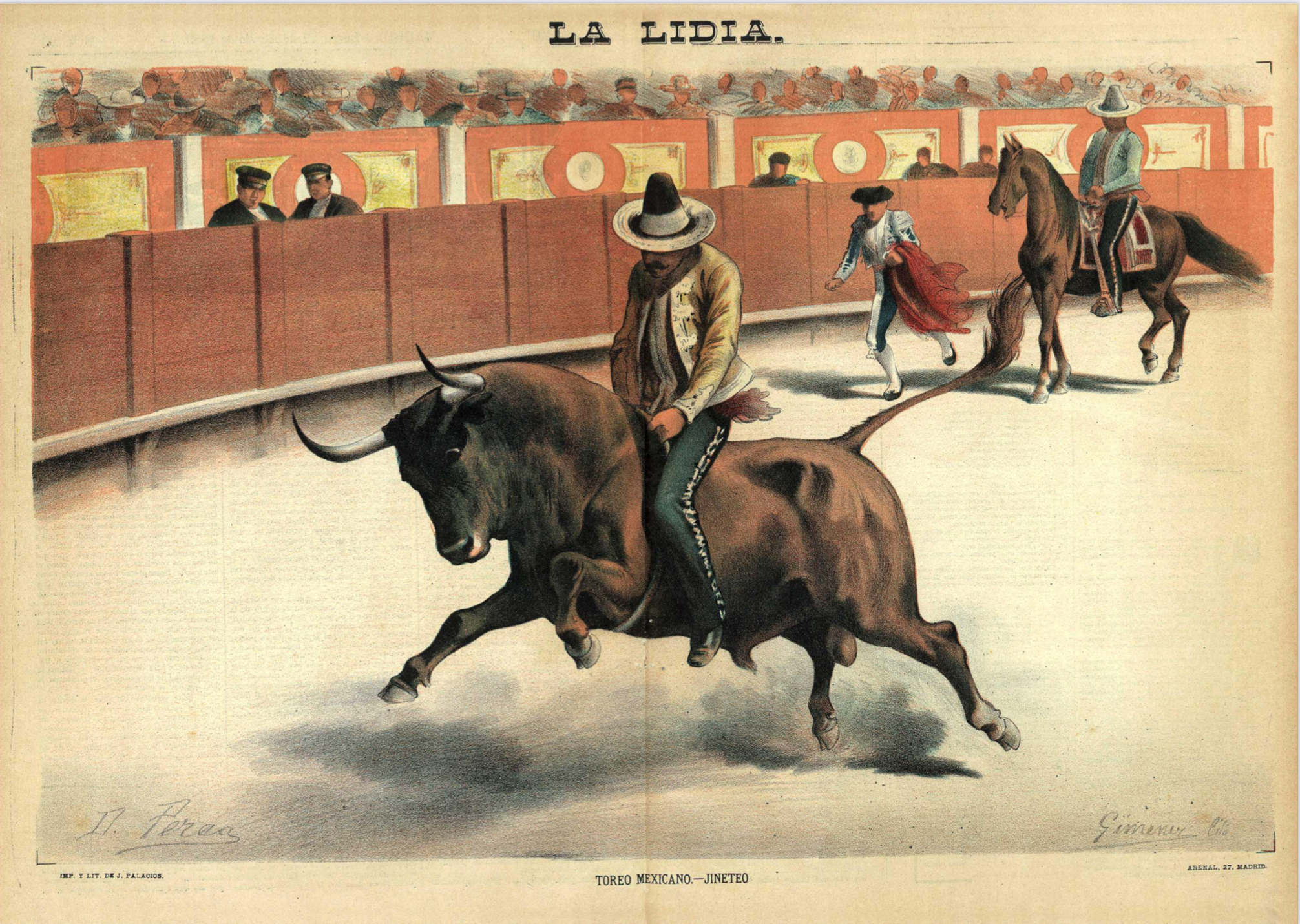
Bull-riding.

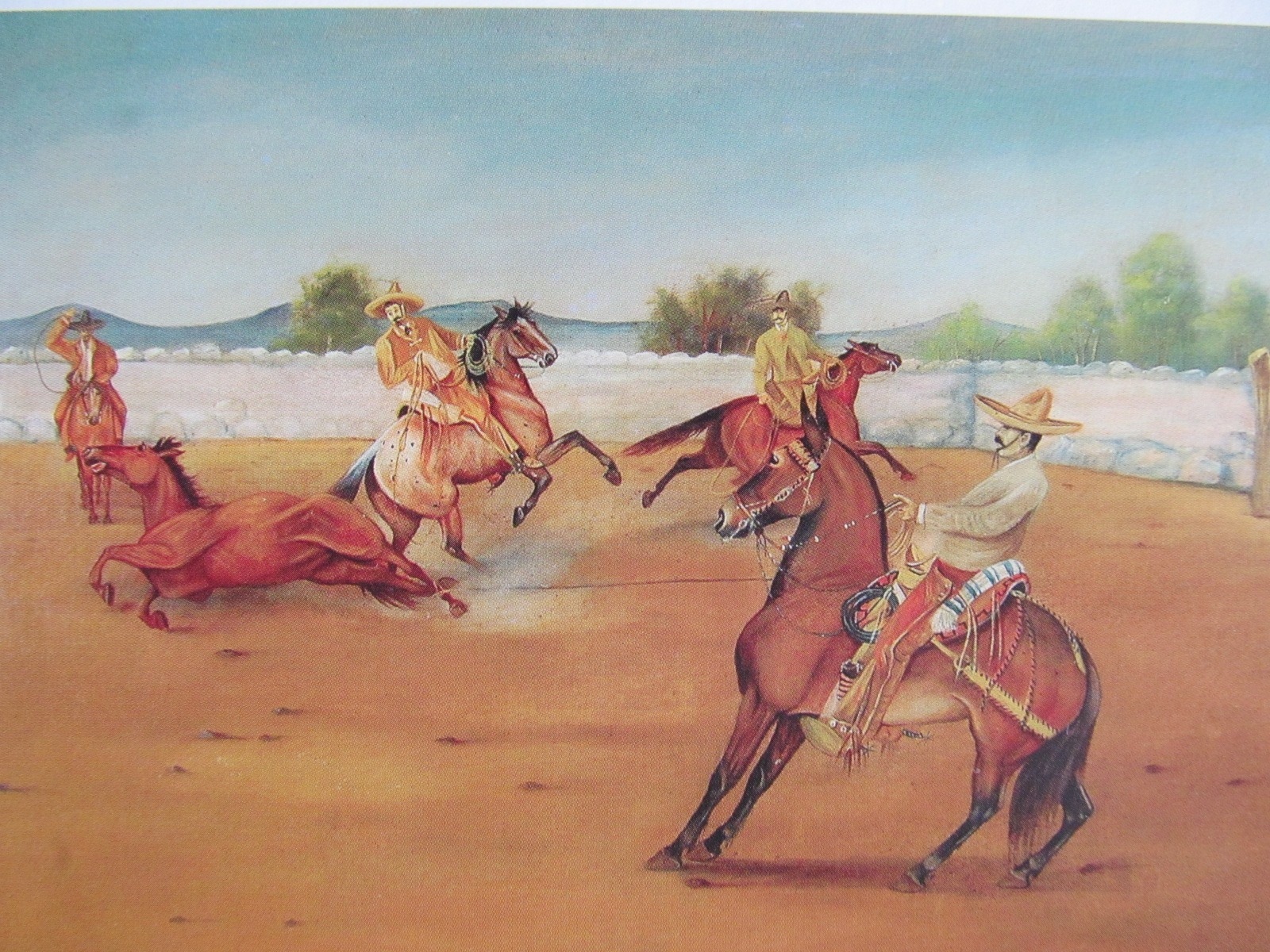
Heeling a horse.

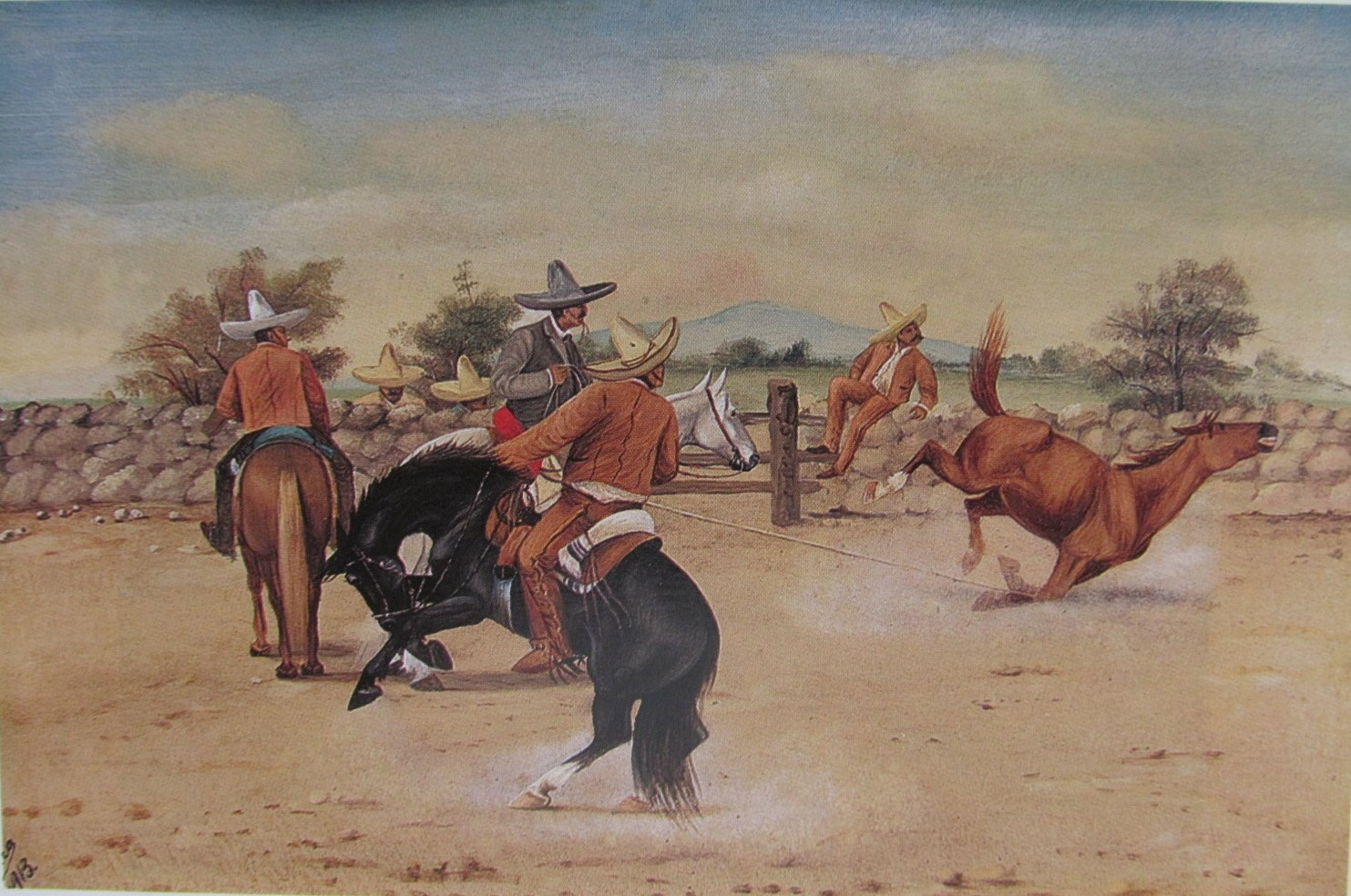
Fore-footing a horse.

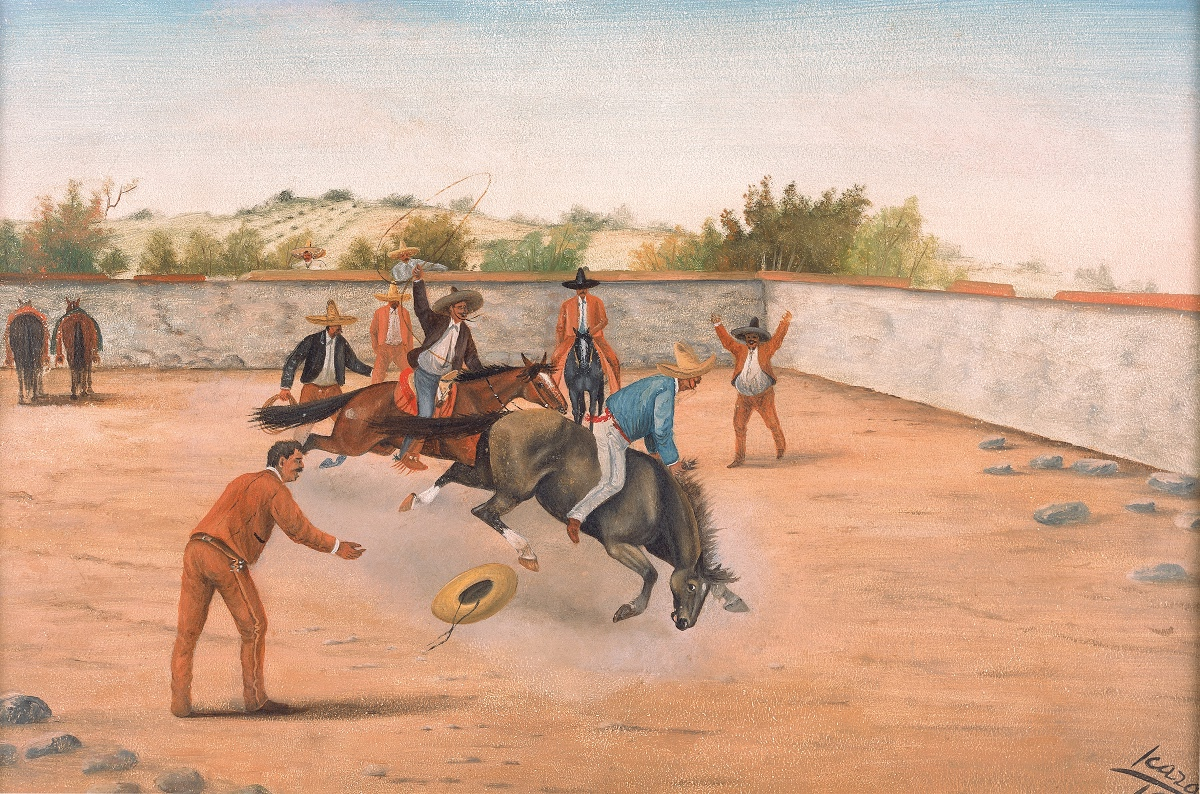
Bronco riding bareback, holding on to the mane.

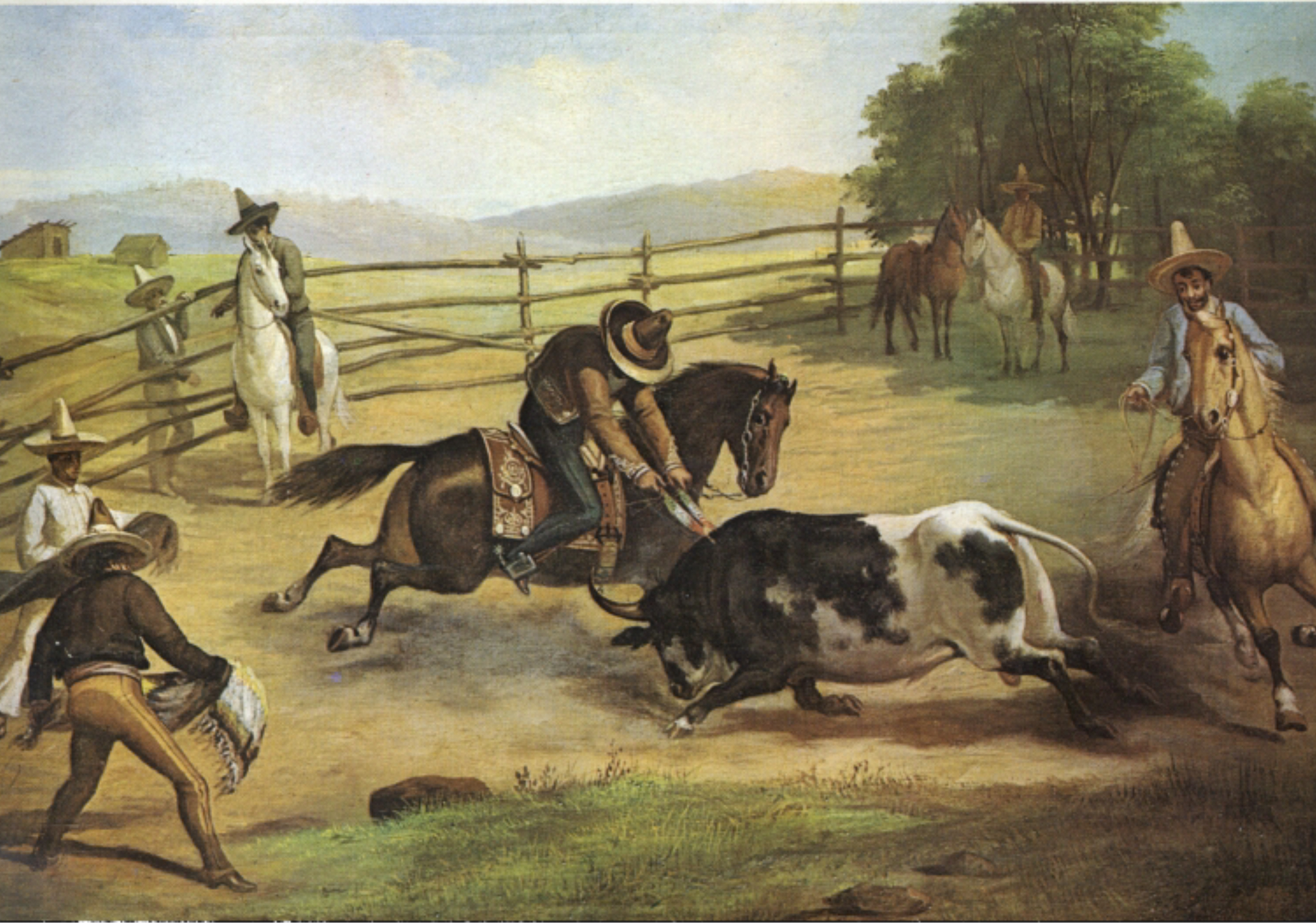
Putting banderillas from horseback.

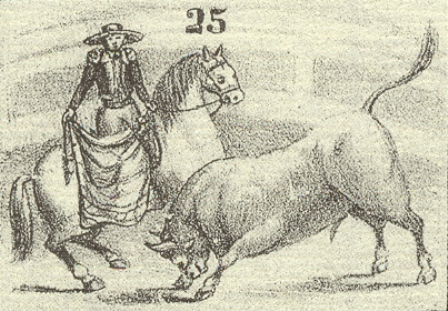
Bullfighting with the capote (cape) from horseback.

Jaripeo differs from Spanish bullfights not only in the feats and events that are being performed, but in the fact that the bulls are not killed; they are simply "played" with or "tormented." In Spanish tradition, the killing of the bull is perhaps the most important element, as bullfighting arose from the montería, or big game hunting practiced by the Spanish elite, and from Roman and Ancient Greek spectacles. However, jaripeo originates from activities and tasks performed on the open-range, such as hunting or roping wild cattle and horses, breaking wild colts, herding cattle, branding, among other activities that did not necessarily involve slaughtering livestock. Jaripeo is simply the set of equestrian and cowboy skills and exercises derived from ranching traditions transformed into a sport.

For this reason, charros place greater importance on skill and spectacle, whether in their equestrian skills or in the artistic use of the lasso, because that is the ultimate goal of the sport, not the killing of the bull.

The famous bullfighting writer and historian José Sánchez de Neira, who also witnessed the exploits of Ponciano Díaz and other Mexican charros such as Agustín Oropeza, explained why Mexicans were far better horsemen and more skilled at bullfighting on horseback than Spaniards, stating in 1889:

“Bullfighting is what we do in Spain, and bullfighting is also what is done in Mexico. The highest degree of possible perfection predominates among our people—nowadays, more than ever—in the feats performed on foot, while that remote country has a head start on us in those performed on horseback. This is not because there is a lack of good riders and brave horsemen here, nor because in Mexico there is a lack of men of valor and agility who would do on foot what many of our people do, but because the need to initially attend to hunting cattle for their livelihood, the profit that this active exercise later provided to commerce, the enjoyment and pleasure that hunting provides when it presents dangers, have made the inhabitants of that country true specialists in the art of jineta (Note: An Arab or African riding method in which the rider rode with shorter stirrups, with his legs bent, allowing the rider a more direct and precise contact of the "lower aids" with the horse's sides, sitting firmly in the center of the saddle, keeping the feet firmly resting on the stirrups; it was the typical riding method of light cavalry. This form of riding was introduced to Spain by the Moors, and the Spaniards introduced it to Mexico in the 16th century where it was refined and perfected gaining greater prominence, acquiring a distinct “New World” style and form.) horsemanship. [...] From this stems that country's fondness for the Jaripeo, which is, let's say, the playing with wild cattle, and from this comes Mexican bullfighting.”

And Leopoldo Vázquez, but in his book "América Taurina" (1898), stated:

“Mexico is where bullfighting has acquired the greatest development and is therefore the region of the Americas where the aforementioned feats are performed with the greatest artistry, and where it is certain that, we repeat, it will soon reach greater perfection.”

=== 20th Century ===
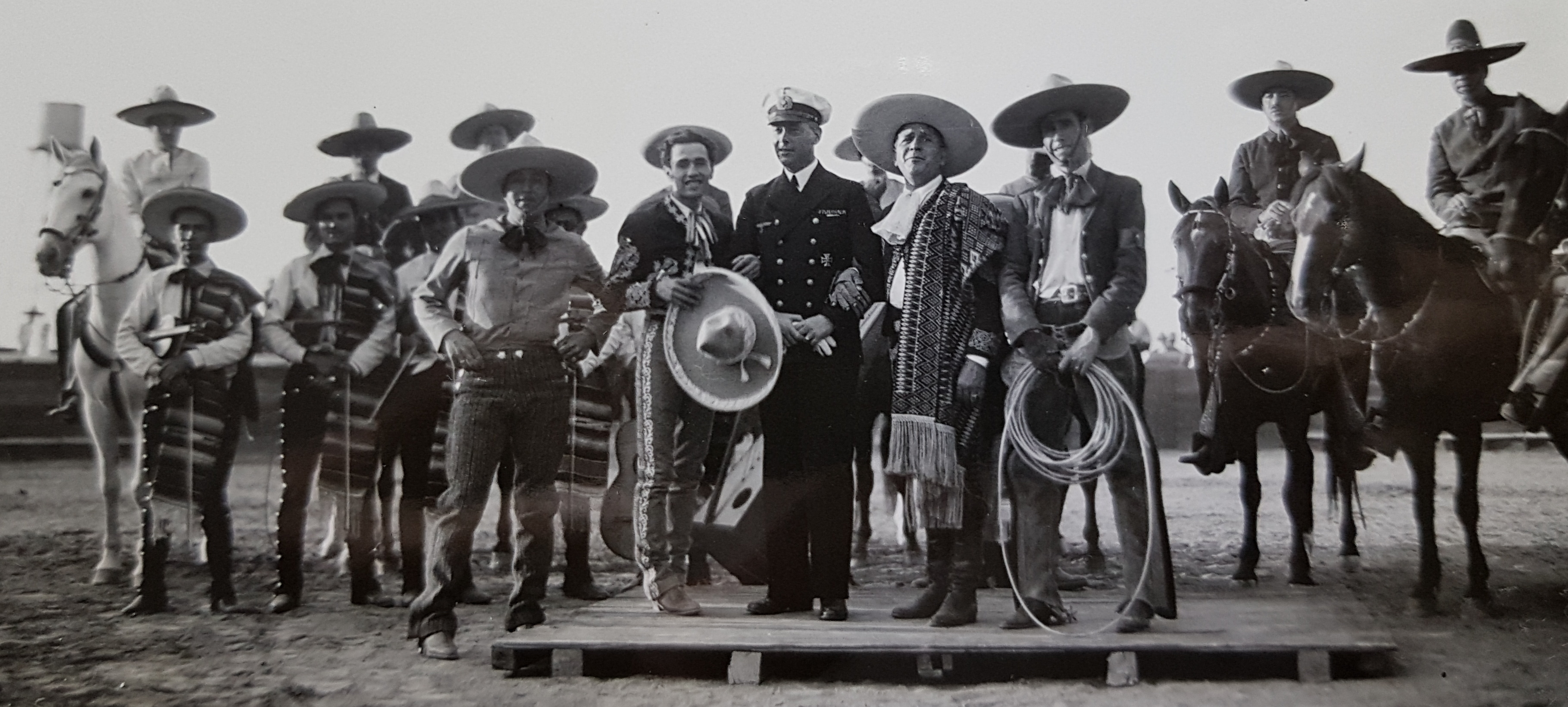
Charro Festival in Mexico City, April 1935.

Due to the Mexican Revolution, the haciendas were dissolved and destroyed, putting an end to large-scale cattle ranching in the country and, as a result, the rapid disappearance of charro traditions. Charros began to gather together to rescue and keep the vaquero traditions alive. In 1920 (the year the Mexican Revolution ended), Silvano Barba, Inés Ramírez, and Andrés Zemeño created the first Mexican charrería group in Guadalajara, called “Charros de Jalisco”. A year later, charros from all over the country gathered to form the National Association of Charros. In 1933, by decree of President Abelardo L. Rodríguez, Charrería was designated a "genuinely national" sport and September 14 as “Día del Charro” (National Charro Day).

The advent of Mexican cinema brought increased popularity, especially musicals that combined rancheras with the charro image.

Mexican Americans in the United States also performed several charreadas during the same period, but in the 1970s, the Mexican Federation of Charrería (FMCH) began helping them establish official charreadas north of the border. They are now quite common. Sometimes, champion teams from the United States compete in the Mexican national competition.

== Lienzo charro ==
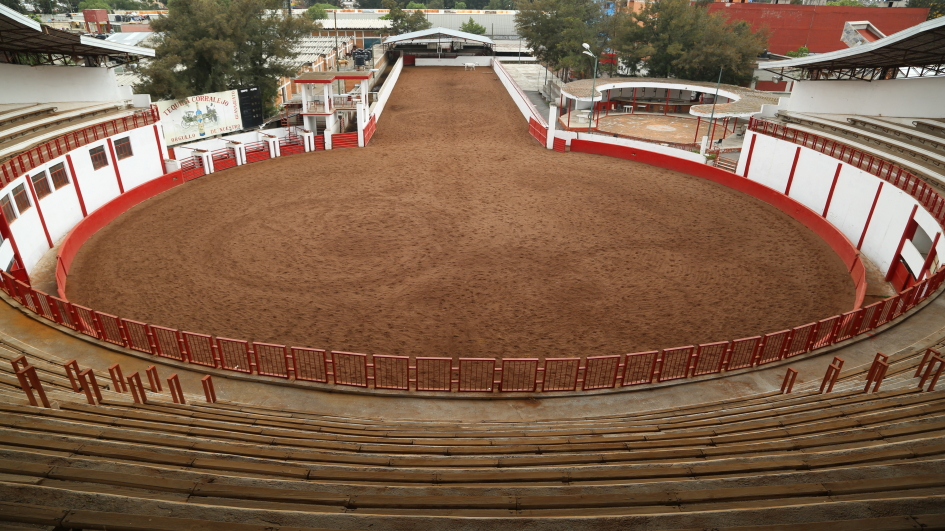
Lienzo Charro in Mexico City.

A lienzo charro is a specially designed facility for the practice of horse riding. This is the arena where charros hold the events of charreadas and jaripeos. A lienzo has two areas: one marked-off area consisting of a lane 12 meters (13 yards) wide by 60 meters (66 yards) long which leads into a circle area that is 40 meters (44 yards) in diameter.

== Charro horse ==
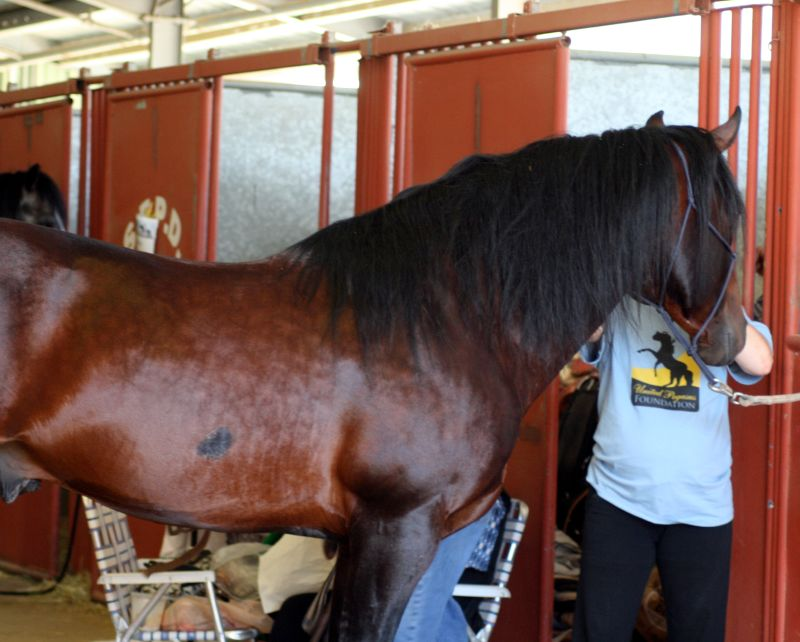
Azteca stallion horse, a mexican horse, bred in 1972 as a horse for charros.

It is said that the ideal horse for charrería is the American Quarter Horse. Another outstanding breed for charrería events is the Azteca horse. The American Quarter Horse breed traces back to the 17th century, and the creation of the Azteca horse was in 1972 in the Mexican high school of horsemen in Rancho San Antonio, Texcoco. The Azteca horse was bred specifically for charros. Both of these horse breeds are well-suited for the intricate and quick maneuvers required in reining, cutting, working cow horse, barrel racing, calf roping, and other western riding events, especially those involving live cattle.

== Clothing and Horse Tack ==
=== Men ===
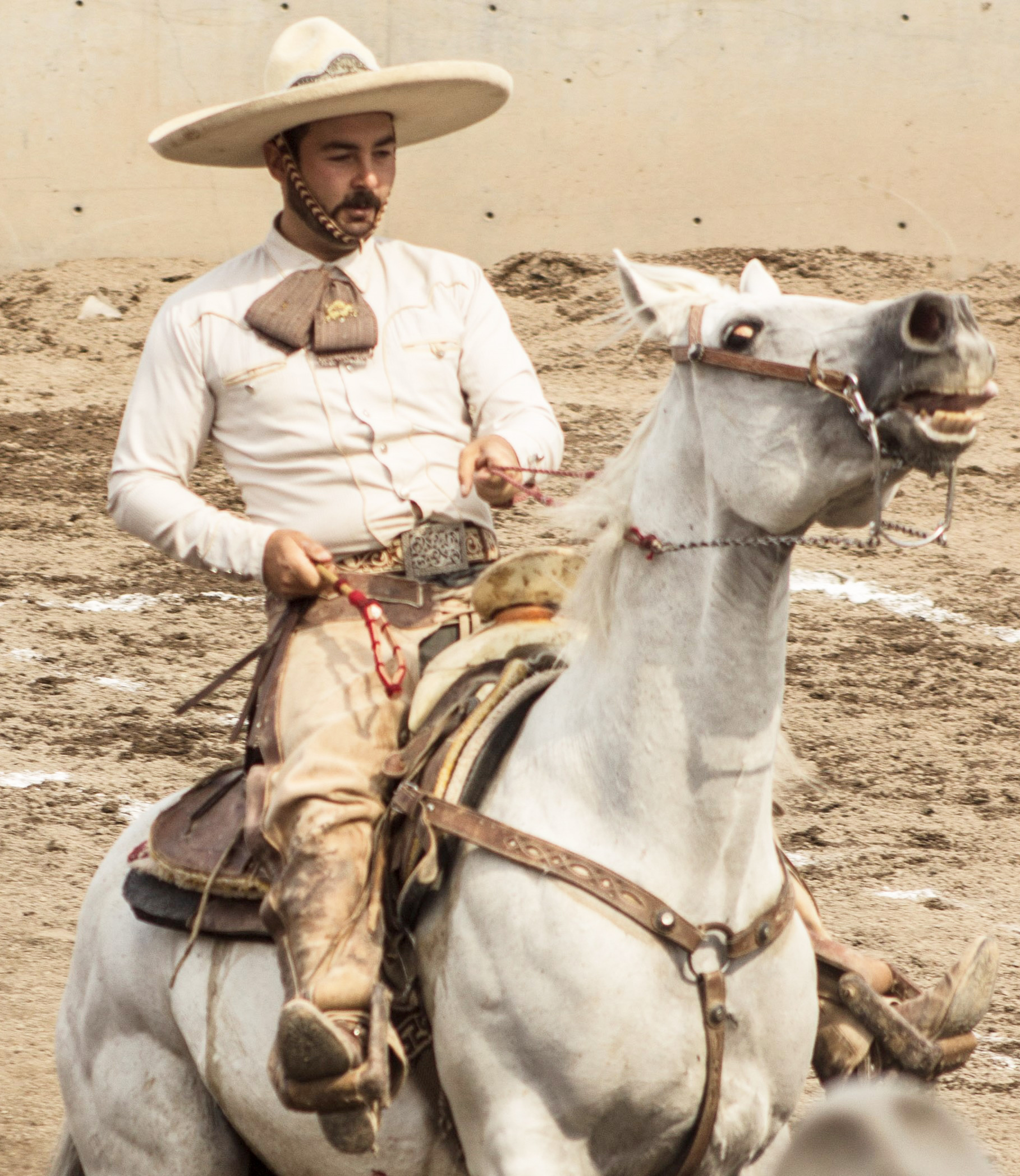
Charro in Working attire for competition.

There are five types of attire that the charro may own. They are the working, half-gala, gala, grand gala, and etiquette. The most commonly used attire is the working uniform. This is the suit that is worn in the competitions. The grand gala uniform is the most layered. It will come complete with a felt charro sombrero with silver and gold embroidery, and the jacket and pants are of fine cashmere with silver buttons. The working uniform is the most simple. It includes a plain button up shirt, a bow, pants, boots and a palm leaf charro sombrero.

=== Women ===
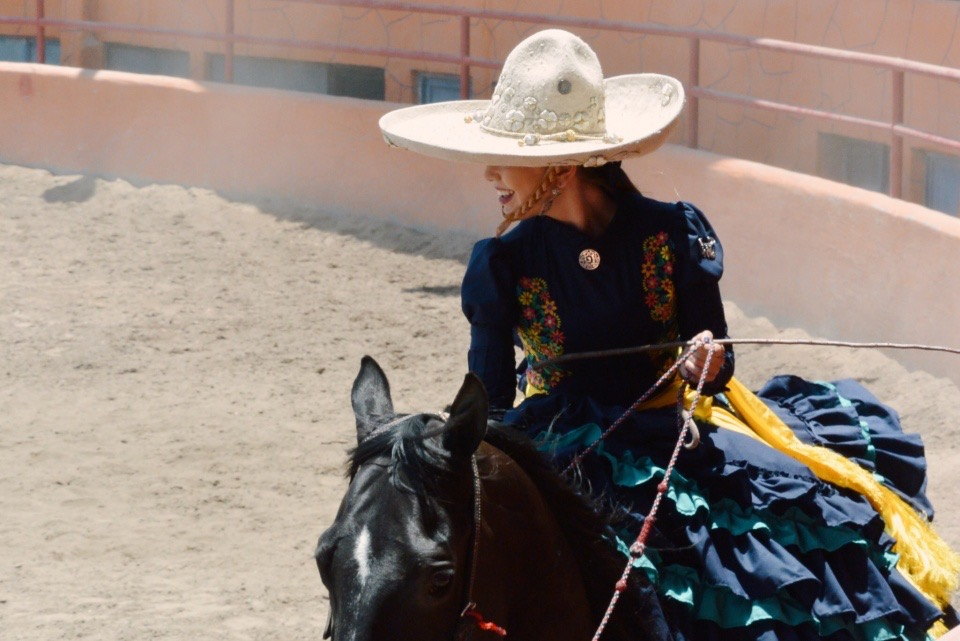
Escaramuza in Adelita uniform for competition.

Unlike men's charro attire, the women in charreria only have 3 outfits, with the china poblana outfit being used for all types of events. The china poblana outfit consists of a low-cut blouse with short sleeves, embroidered with silk, beads or colored sequins, and a cloth or flannel skirt with at least one ruffle, embroidered with beads or sequins, with layers of lace visible at the bottom of the skirt. The use of a petticoat is indispensable. Silk shoes with buckles are used to match the embroidery of the skirt. Shawl is used to match the color of the skirt. A fine, felt charro hat with suede, gold and/or silver chapetas is the topper. Sash is used at the waist, tied in a bow at the back. Also, women must have their hair pulled back in a low bun, usually adorned with a fabric or lace bow, or two braids decorated with ribbons.

Although the china poblana outfit is used for most performances, there are three different attires the escaramuza charras use, the adelita, the charra de faena (“working” attire) and the china poblana.

=== Horses ===
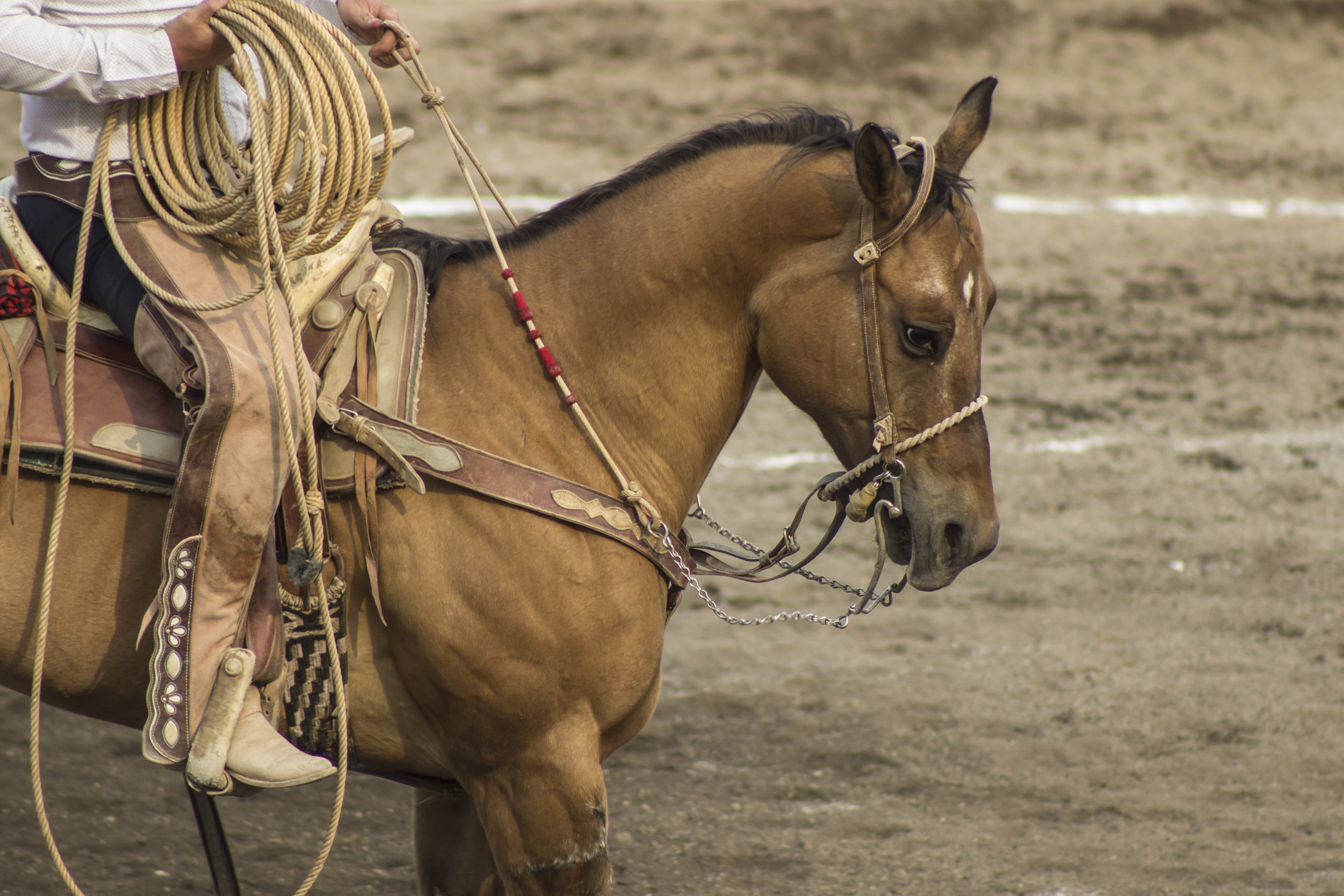
Detail of charro horse tack.

The equipment for the horse has to meet specifications, just as the charro's clothing must. All equipment on the saddle must be made of natural materials, not man-made such as plastic. There are primarily two types of saddles that the charro owns: the working saddle and the formal saddle.

The saddle of the charro has a wider horn than that of a western saddle, which helps safeguard the charro from being pitched off or hung up. There are two grips at the back of the saddle, in case the charro needs to hold on because of an unexpected act of the horse.

All charros must comply with regulation for the practice of their sport and clothing. They even have a rigorous protocol to initiate celebrations and team meetings.

== Sportsmen ==
=== Charro ===
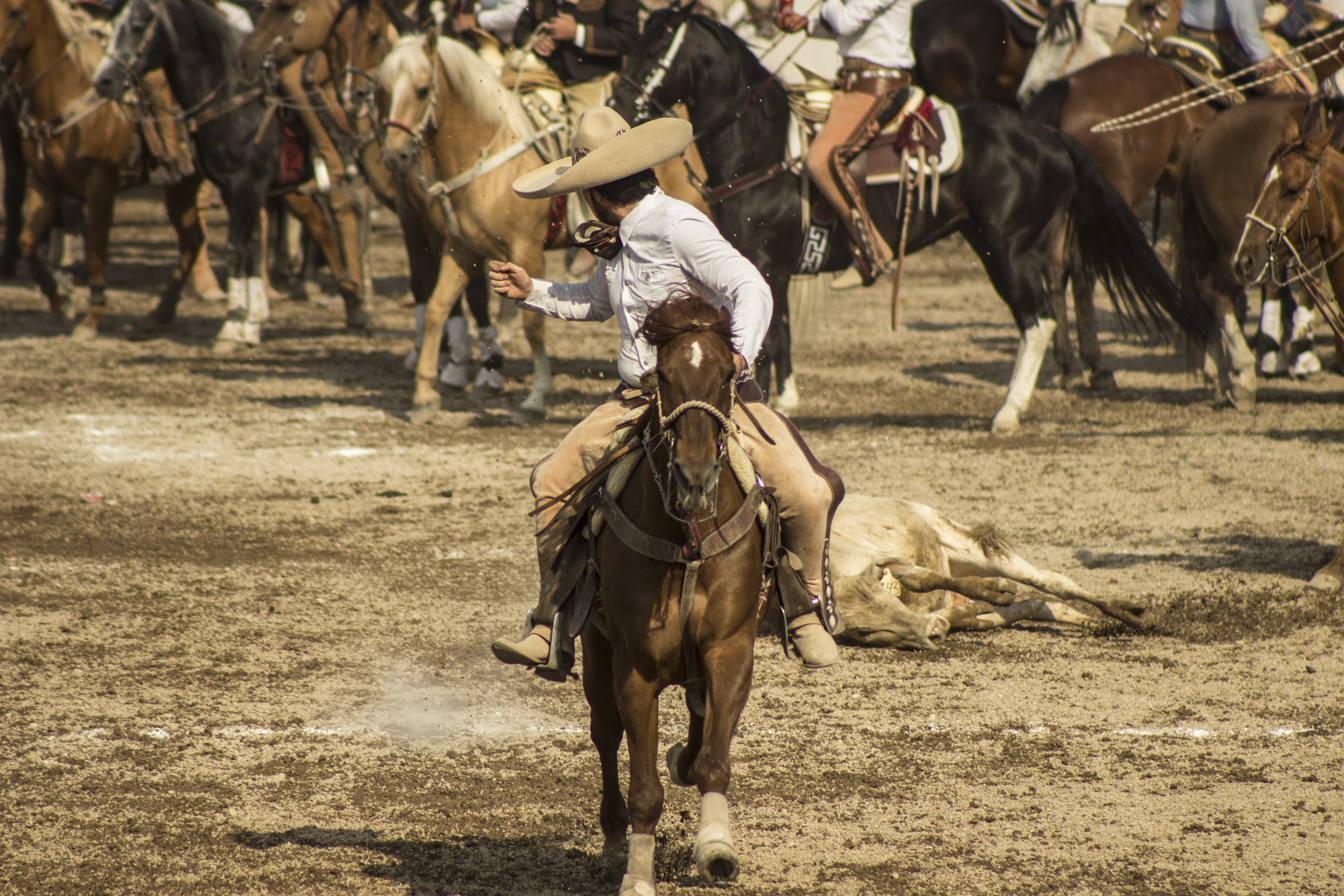
charro on horseback.

The charro, is the male rider who practices charrería, and is also oftentimes the national icon for Mexico. The modern charro evolved from a long line of mexican horsemen. Dating back to the Spanish conquest, the Mexican vaqueros paved the way for chinacos, a liberal informal military that fought in the Mexican War of Independence, which later gave birth to the charros around the Mexican Revolution.

The word charro was originally used in the 18th century, as a derogatory term for country people, meaning rough, rustic, coarse, unsophisticated, gaudy and in bad taste; synonymous with the English terms yokel, bumpkin, or redneck. The word eventually evolved separately in both Spain and Mexico, to mean different things. In Spain it became a demonym or term to identify the natives of Salamanca, in a place known as campo charro. In Mexico, the term became the name of the people of the countryside, specifically the horse mounted people, also known as Rancheros, who performed all their duties in the Mexican haciendas, on horseback. In the rest of the Spanish speaking world, the word retained its original derogatory connotation.

Although in modern times, the only people that are technically a charro are men who practice charreria, the look of this figure has expanded to music and film. Mariachi bands very often sport a Gran Gala charro-esc outfit, since mariachi music has become synonymous with the charreada, but these musicians do not classify as technical charros and the outfits they wear are for look rather than practicality.

=== Escaramuza charra ===
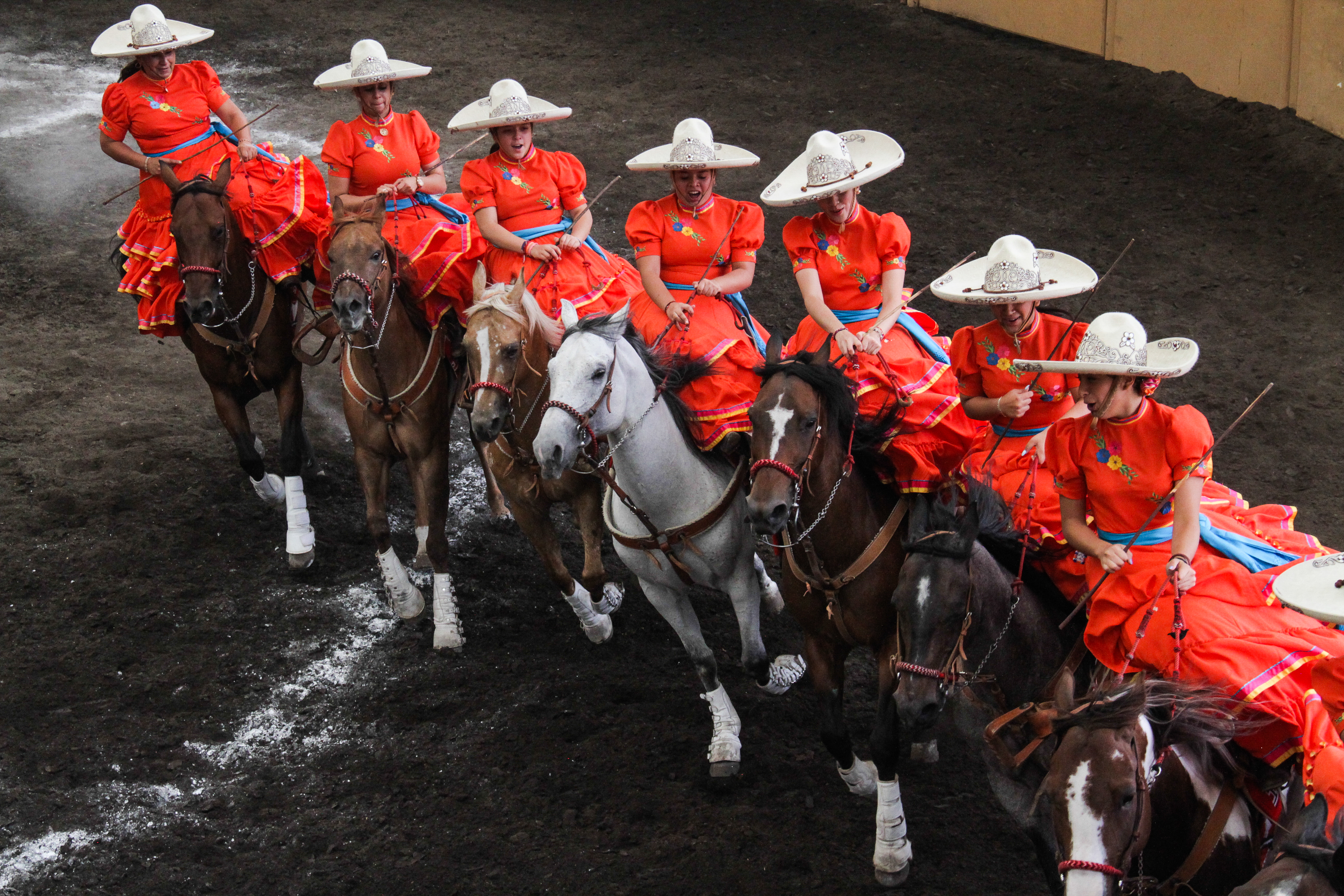
Escaramuza in formation.

The women who practice this sport are called charras, since the term escaramuza is used to name the set of ladies that make up the sports team, and it is not the correct term to refer to a charra in the singular.

The female part of charreria, the escaramuza charra, is said to originate from the Altos de Jalisco. Specifically, from Tepatitlán de Morelos. Their clothing is adelita styled china poblana outfits which originate from the state of Puebla and they do tricks with the horse, accompanied by an artistic touch, with samples such as la coladera, combinado, la escalera and la flor.

Although within the National Association of Charros, the escaramuza charra is said to be created by Mr. Everardo Camacho and instructor Luis Ortega in 1953, which was made up of young girls and boys who were between five and nine years old. This first escaramuza was made up of siblings Guadalupe, Antonio and José Camacho, as well as Luis, Arturo and María Eugenia Ruiz Loredo. As it was something innovative at that time. It was very successful, since in that presentation the children demonstrated their skill when riding in the charro style and the education of their horses.

An escaramuza charra is made up of eight members and its presentation consists of 12 exercises which are at high speed and consist of making crosses and turns, which demonstrates the skill that the ladies have to ride and the good rein of their horses. Dresses can vary in color in pairs, quartets, or individual.

Escaramuza charras undergo intensive training to control their horses in coordination as a team.

== Events ==
=== Cala de Caballo ===
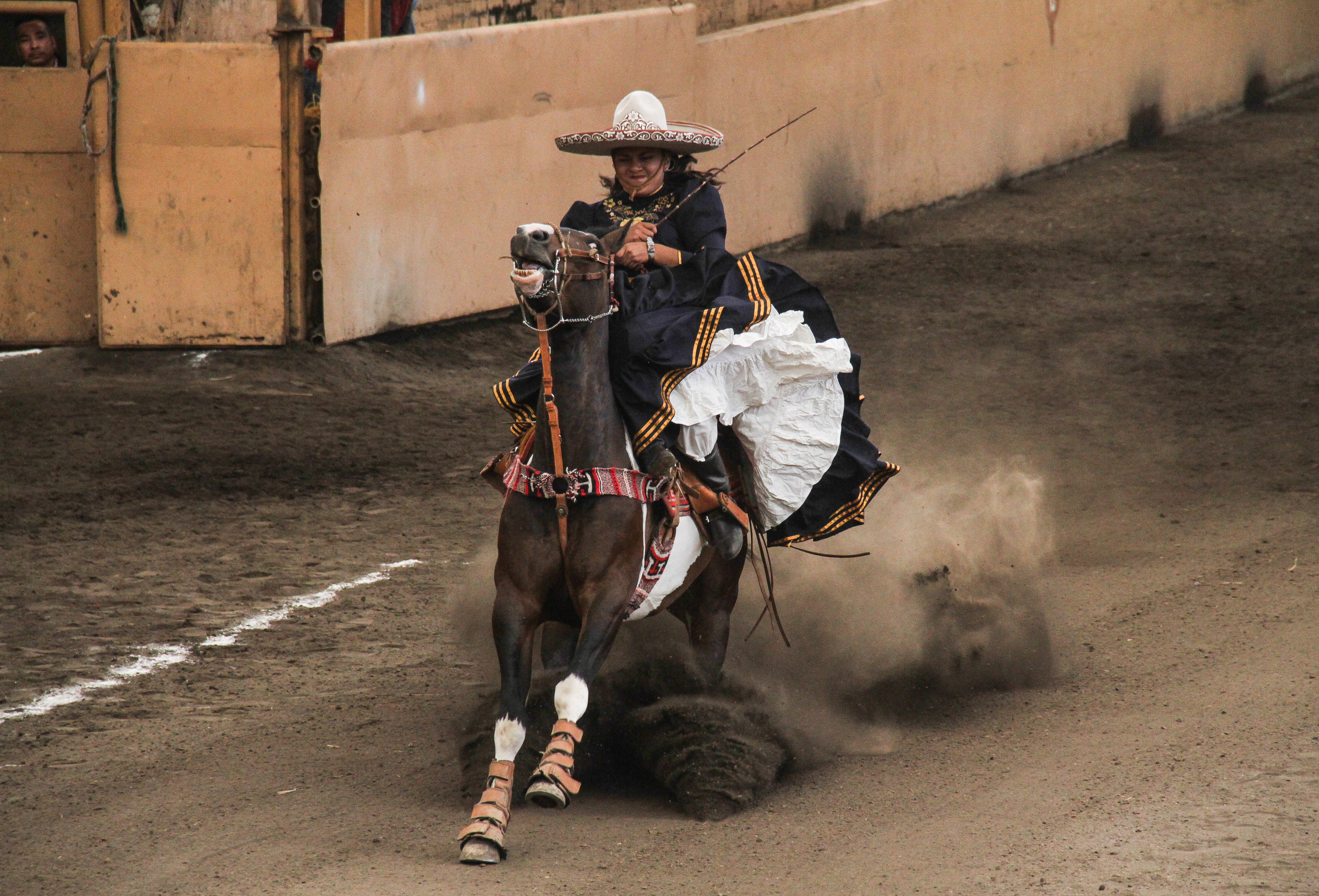
Escaramuza performing the Cala de Caballo.

This event is the demonstration of the good rein and education of the charro horse. This event includes: good governance, stirrup, meekness, gait, gallop, run, eyebrow and head and tail postures. It consists of the horse running at full speed and braking in a single time and this is called tip. Then come the sides where the horse has to rotate on its own axis supported by a single leg like this towards both sides. Next come the half sides where the charro must do the same, but in the middle. At the end of this event, the charro must walk back to the fifty meter line. This event is done within the 20 x 6 meter rectangle section of the lienzo.

This charro event is considered one of the most important within the national sport par excellence, since it demonstrates the connection (communication) that exists between the charro (rider) and the horse. It is considered one of the hardest events to master and also comes with the most elaborately scoring. It is possible to score more negative points than positive ones. It was officially consummated as a national sport in the 20th century. Likewise, it is shown if the horse is comfortable or is uncomfortable with some type of harness that is used for its handling.

=== Piales ===
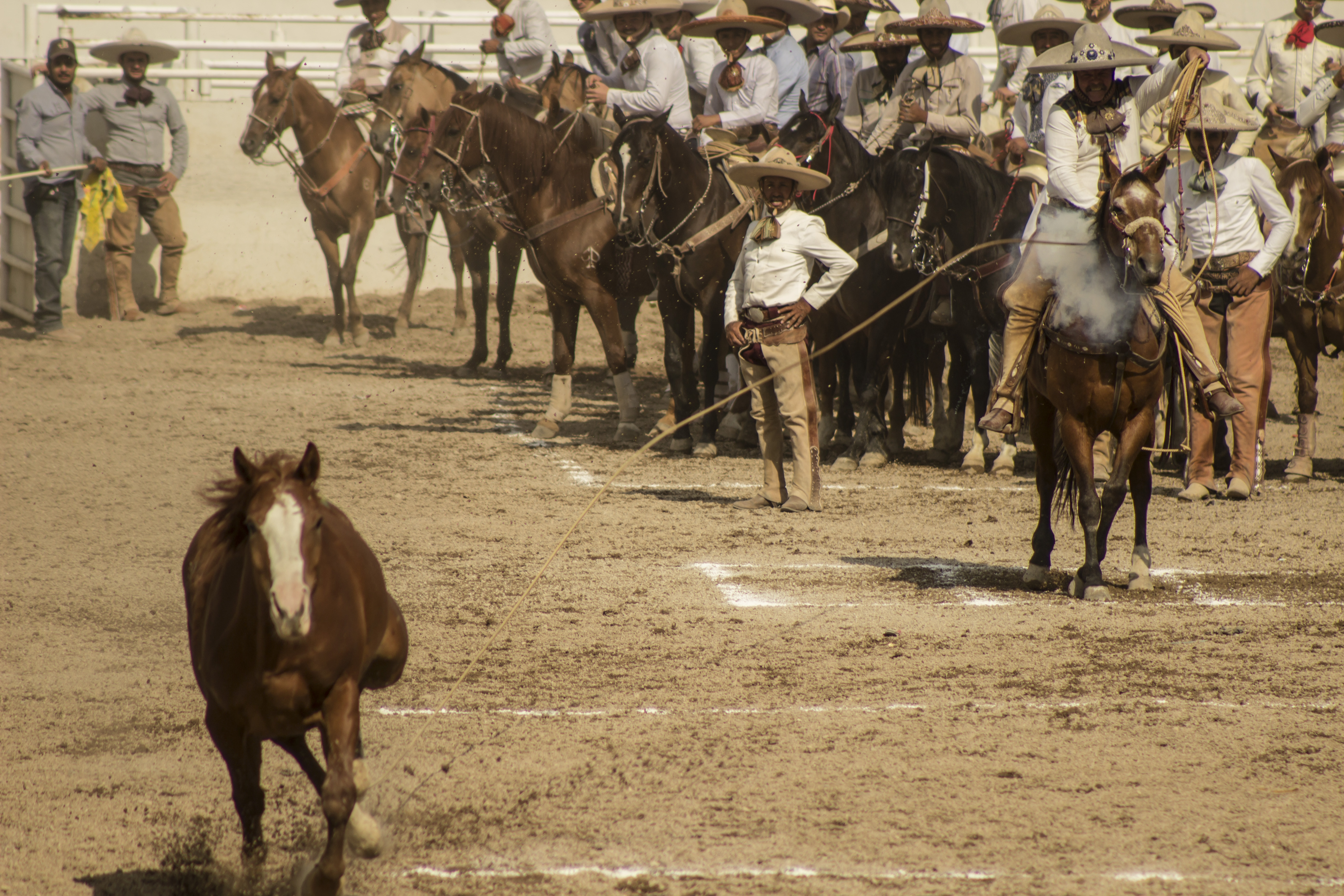
Charro performing Piales.

This event consists of tying the hind legs of a mare (female horse) and with this stopping the gallop of the mare completely. The charro, while mounted on his horse, must throw a lasso, let the mare run through the loop, catching it by the hind legs, then wrapping his rope on the head of his saddle to squirt it as necessary, gradually reducing the speed of the mare until it comes to a complete stop. During the performance of this event, the charro must be careful of correctly looping the rope and not causing knots to prevent major hand injuries. Three opportunities are given. Points are awarded for distance needed to stop the mare. This is done in the rectangular portion of the arena.

There are different types of piales, some of them are the pial de piquete, pial floreado, and the pial de chaqueta. The pial de piquete consists of having the lasso to the ground and when the mare passes, lasso it with force towards the hind legs of the mare, the pial floreado consists of making a small “floreando” (rope trick) just before the mare passes and when the animal passes, throw it at the hind legs and the pial de chaqueta consists of positioning the charro with his horse with his back to where the mare will pass and making an opposite swirl so that when the mare passes, he places the rope on the hind legs of the mare.

=== Colas en el Lienzo ===
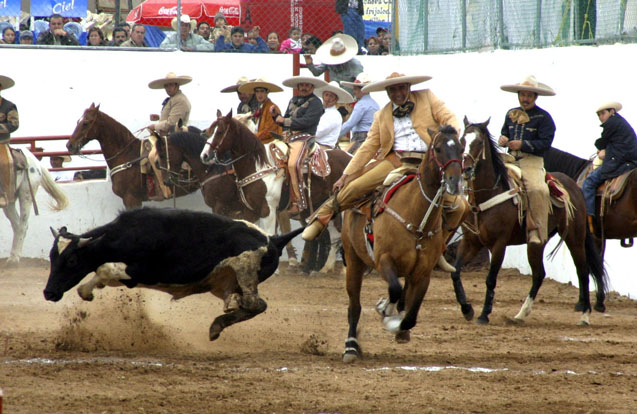
Charro performing the Coleadero or Colas en el Lienzo.

This event (also known as coleadero), consists of trying to bring down a small bull by its tail while it runs. This task is similar to steer wrestling, except that the rider does not dismount. A charro mounted on his horse will wait at the gate of the chute for the exit of a bull, which after greeting and strutting, the charro will ride next to the bull, hold it by its tail and wrap the tail around his leg, eventually trying to bring the bull down to the ground, carrying out all these actions in a maximum distance of 60 meters. Serious injuries can occur to the bulls. Tails may be broken, stripped to the bone (“degloved”), even torn off.

=== Jineteo de toro ===
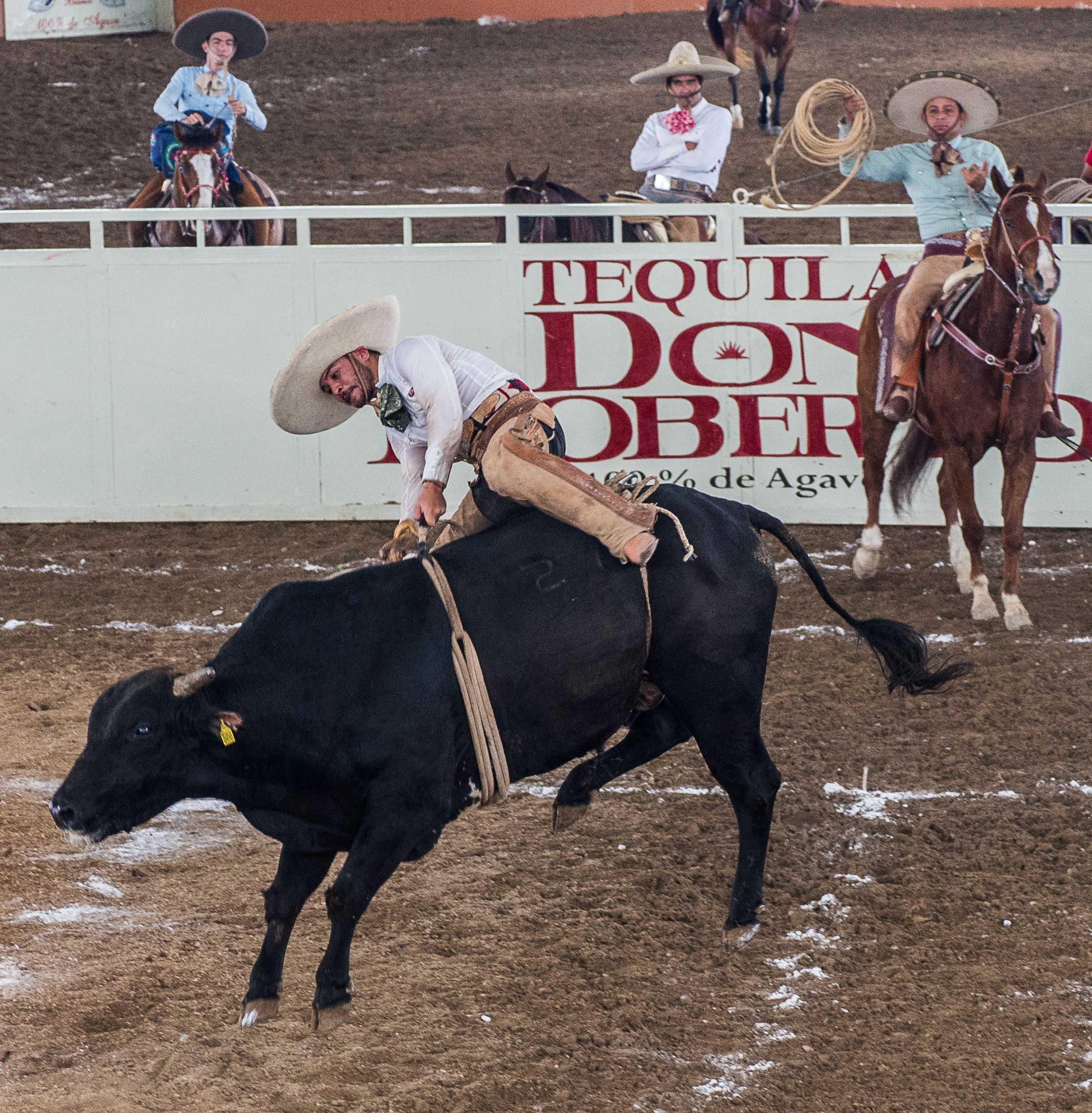
Charro performing the Jineteo de toro.

This event consists of bull riding. The goal is for the rider to stay mounted on a bull until it stops bucking. One or two hands can be used on the bullrope and the charro is able to have up to three assistants inside arena to support the bull's head, tighten and hold the rider's belt. The charro performing this event will give the indication so that the bucking chute is opened. The performance begins when the judges give the order to count the time for tightening, and ends when the bull stops bucking. That is when the rider has 3 minutes to dismount. Every minute saved counts as a point and points are also rewarded for technique. The charro cannot buck off and must dismount and land upright. After the charro dismounts the bull, he must remove the bullrope and bellrope so the Terna en el Ruedo can follow. This event has its roots in an earlier form known as Jaripeo.

=== Terna en el ruedo ===
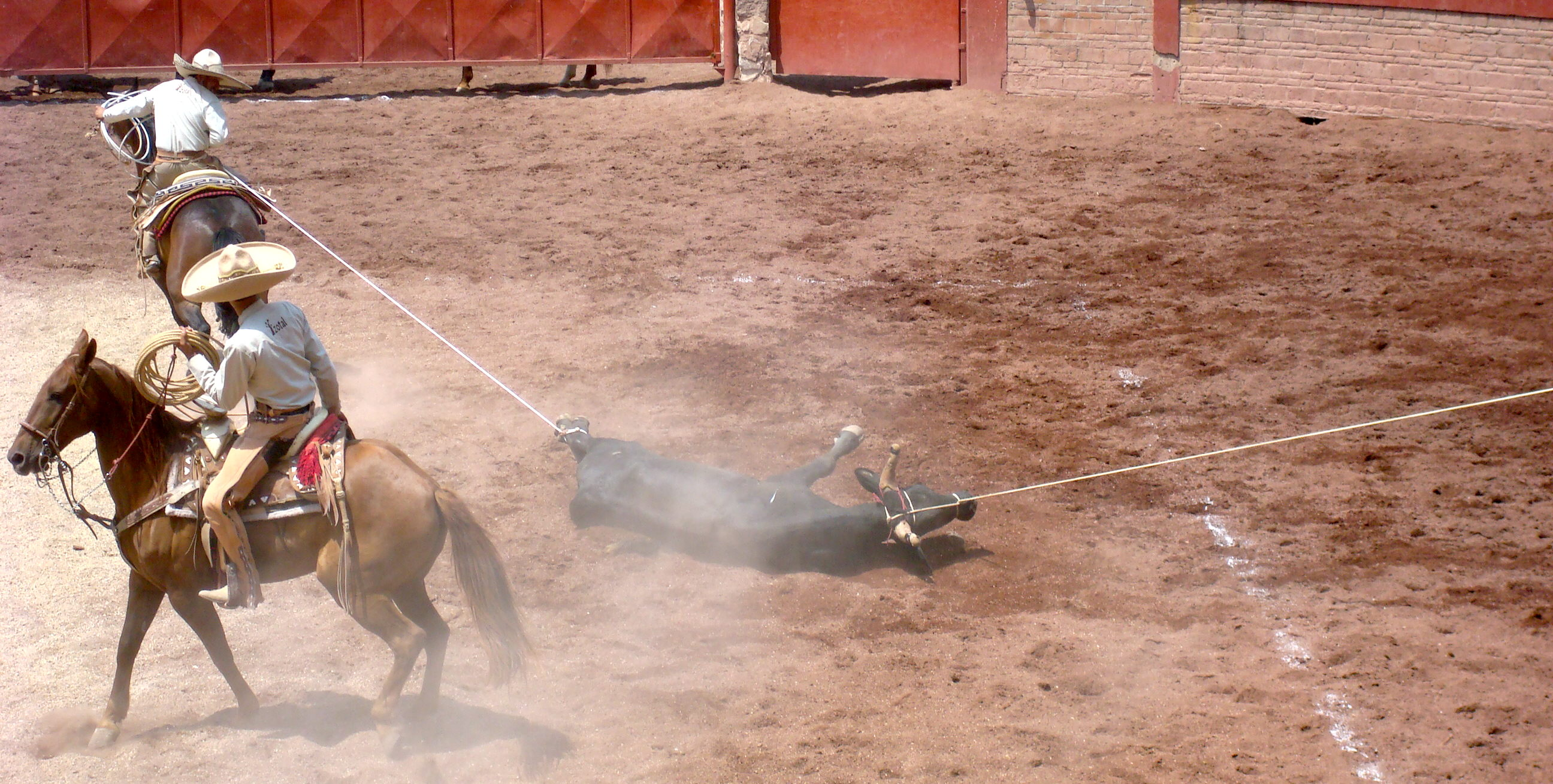
Charros performing Terna en el ruedo.

This event is a team roping event in which three charros attempt to rope a bull - one by its neck, one by its hind legs, and the last then ties its feet together all in a maximum time limit of 6 minutes. Points are awarded for rope tricks and time. The charros have two opportunities each, either to lasso the head of the bull or tread it, the charros will alternate turns, after the first charro gives an attempt then, the second will try and then the third, and so on until their opportunities or their minutes are exhausted. The charro who is roping the bull's neck needs to demonstrate full rope control by performing some rope tricks called “floreando”. While one rope is wrapped around the bull's neck, the other team members need to put a trap to tie the hind legs and then finally bring the bull down.

=== Jineteo de yegua ===
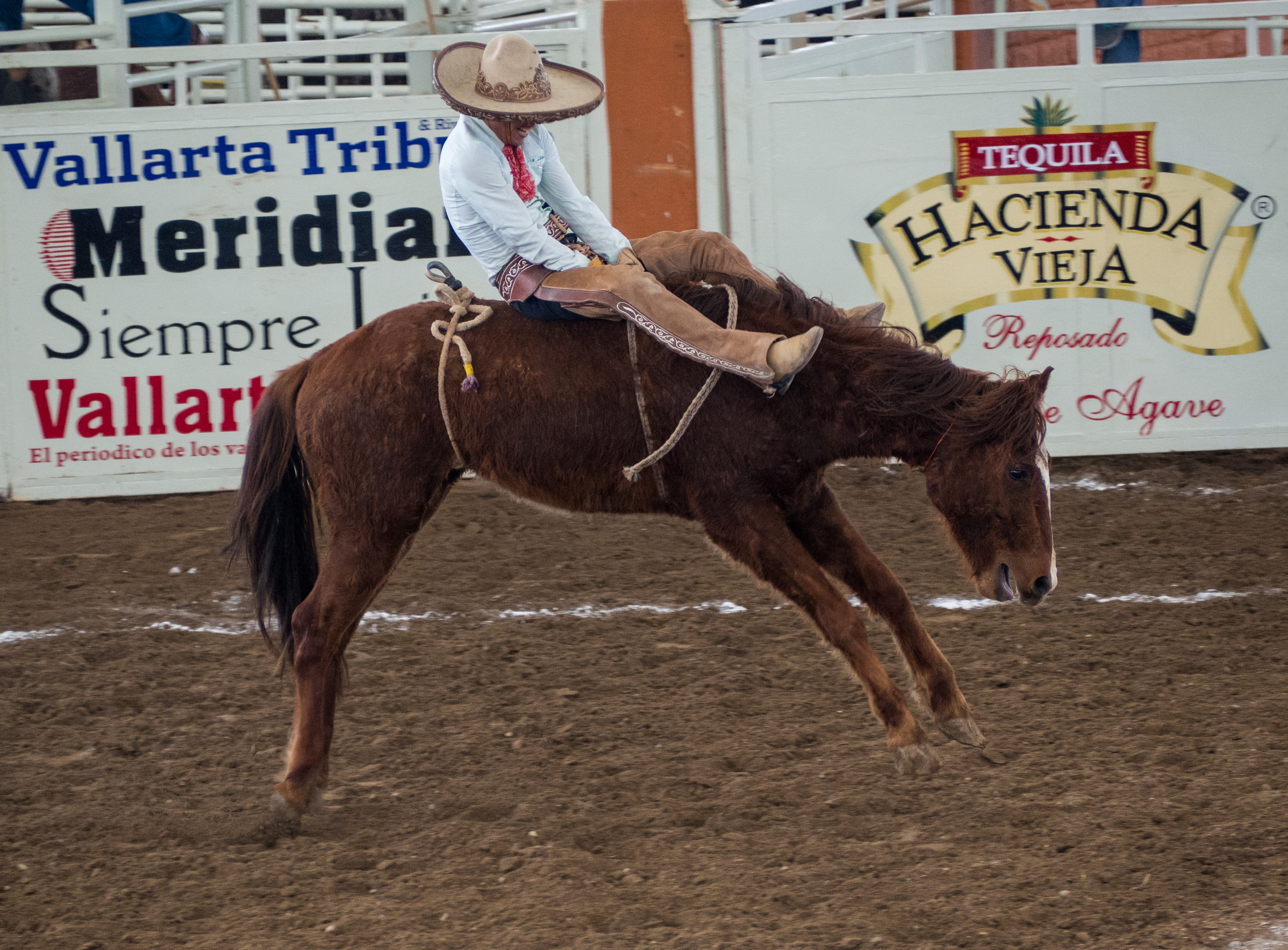
Charro performing the Jineteo de Yegua.

This event is similar to Bareback bronc riding. Yegua means mare. An untrained horse, often a mare, is ridden with a bullrope. Two hands are used and the legs are held horizontally to the ground. Similarly to the bull riding event, riders attempt to stay on the horse until it stops bucking. The mare will be encased and with a team of assistants who also dress as charros. Up to two grippers stretch the bucking strap. Up to three assistants inside support the mare's head, tighten and hold the rider by the belt, so that he can mount the horse and be accommodated. He will give the indication to open the bucking chute. The task begins at the moment the judges give the order to count the time for tightening, and ends when the charro dismounts for any reason.

=== Manganas a pie o a caballo ===
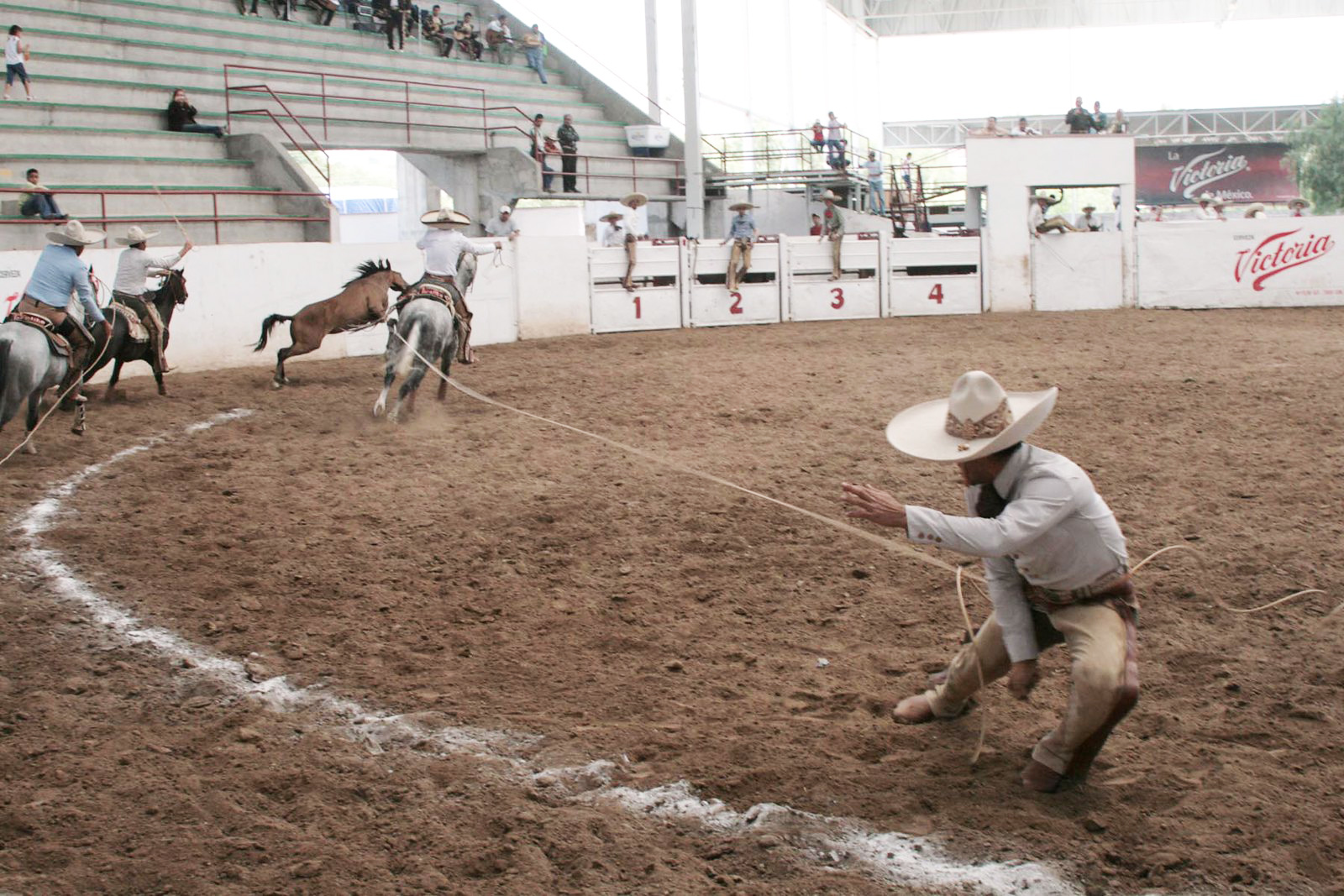
Charro performing the Mangana a Pie.

Manganas a Pie consist of a charro on foot (pie) given three opportunities and eight minutes to rope a horse with his lasso by its front legs and cause it to fall and roll once. The charro manganeador can be located anywhere in the arena at a minimum distance of four meters from the perimeter fence. After flourishing his rope (doing rope tricks), the charro lances his lasso at his target which is the lone horse which struts alongside 3 other horses that are being mounted by other charros, trying to not catch any of the 3 other horses. Manganas a Caballo is a similar concept but instead on horseback.

Points are awarded for time and rope tricks as long as the horse is roped according to the national rules. Points for all three attempts are cumulative. The time to execute the manganas both on foot and on horseback will be 8 minutes. The timer will stop for the first change of mare, as well as by accident or because the mare jumps or leaves the ring. The timer for subsequent mare changes.

=== Paso de la muerte ===
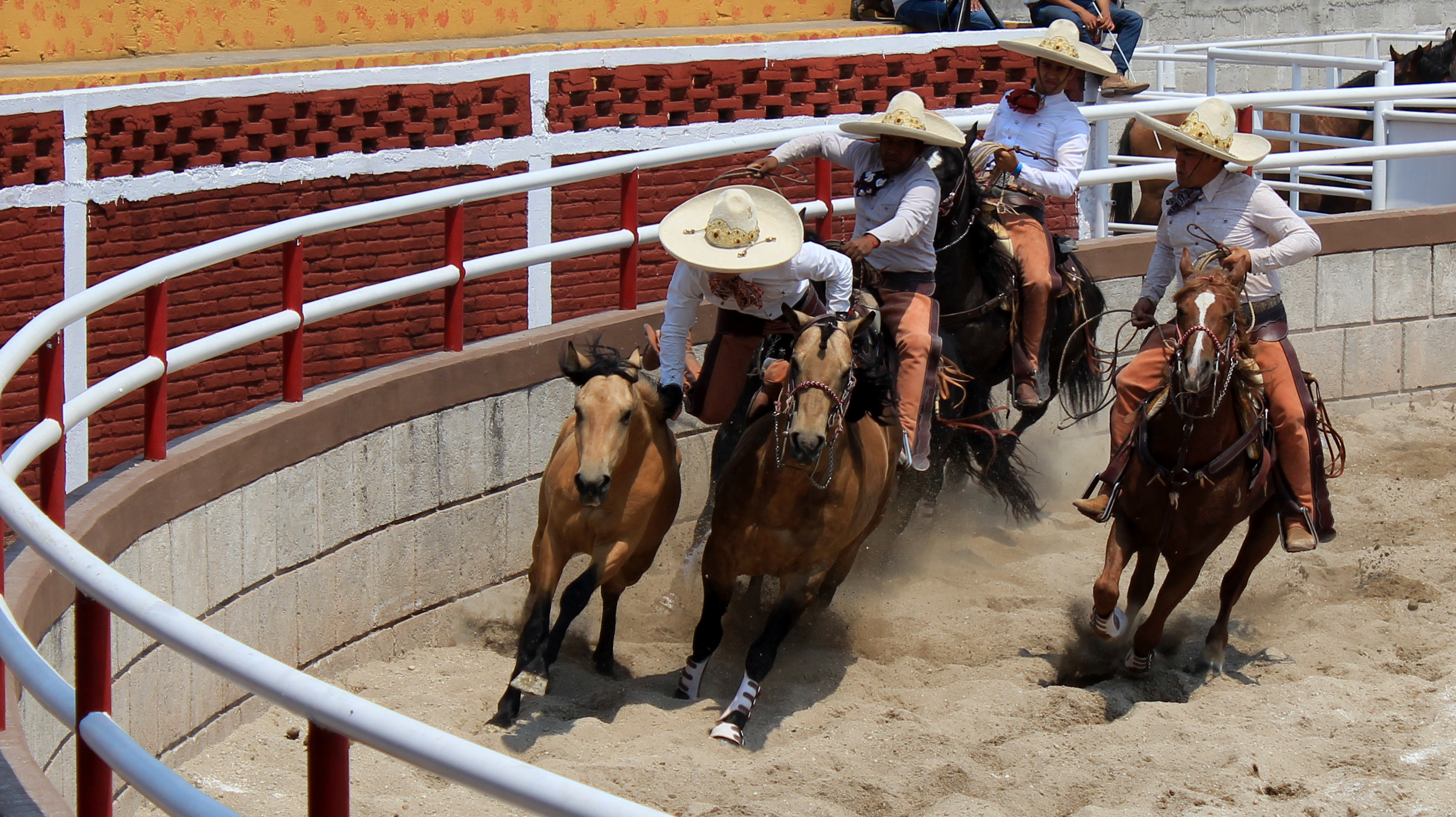
Charros doing a Paso de la Muerte.

This event called The pass of death in Spanish consist of a charro riding bareback with reins attempting to leap from his own horse to the bare back of a loose, unbroken horse without reins and ride it until it stops running. The events gets its name from the high amount of risk of the performance if done incorrectly since this movement can be fatal for the person who executes it since they can fall under the animal and be trampled by the three other riders who herd the animal. This is done backwards at times for show.

== Performance ==
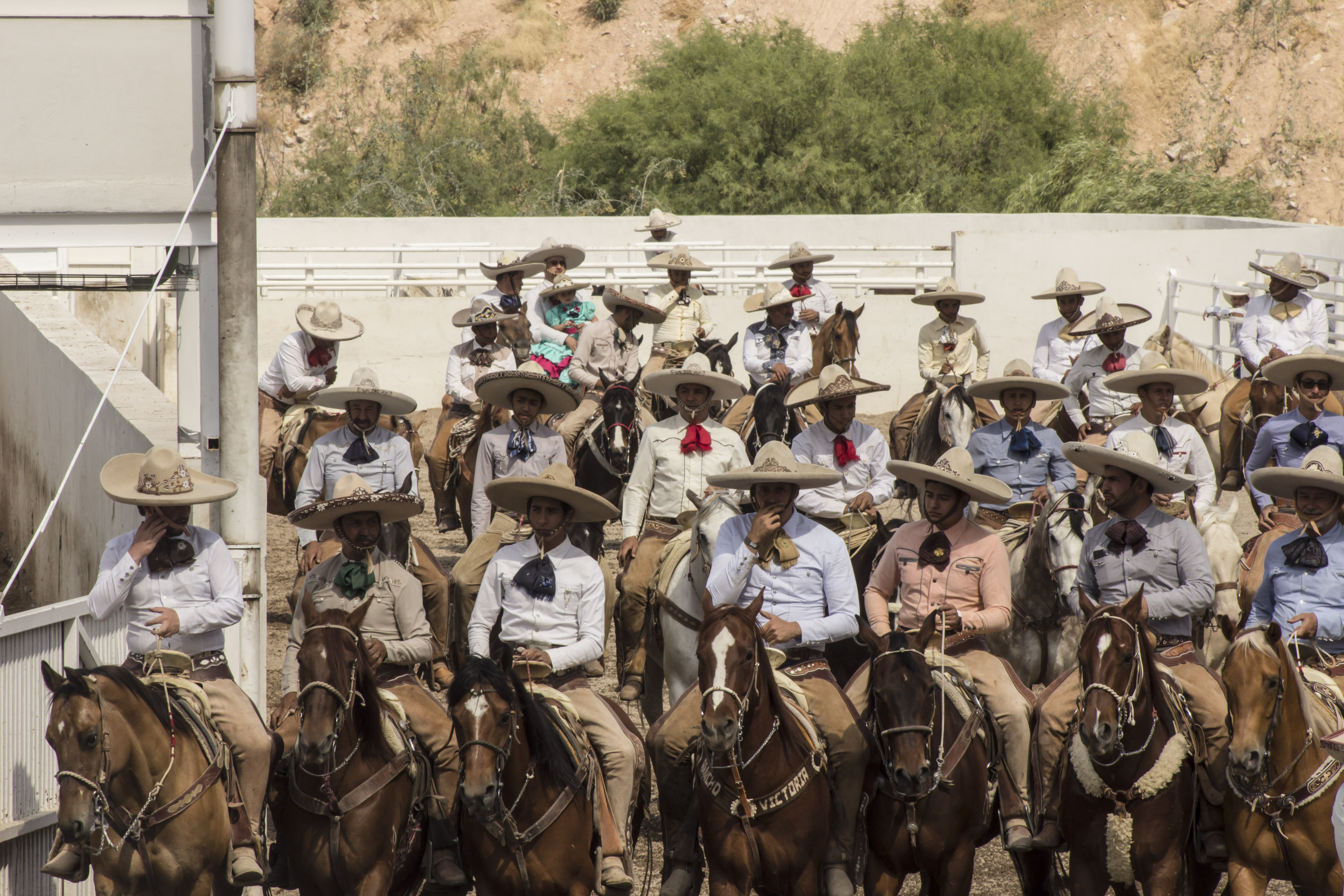
Charros parading on horseback into a chareada.

In the opening ceremony, organizations and participants parade into the arena (the lienzo) on horseback, usually accompanied by a mariachi band or banda playing Marcha Zacatecas and rendering honors to the Mexican flag. This signifies the long tradition of Charros being an auxiliary arm of the Mexican Army. The short charro jacket is reminiscent of that worn by members of Villa's Army.

The charreada itself consists of nine scoring events staged in a particular order (nine for the men and one for the women). Two or more teams, called asociaciones (associations), compete against each other. Teams can compete to become state, regional, and national champions. The competitors are judged by both style and execution.

A playout of a charreada will usually follow the order of:

1. Cala de Caballo (Testing of the Horse) - Men's event
2. Piales en Lienzo (Roping of the Feet) - Men's event
3. Colas en el Lienzo, or Coleadero (Bull tailing) - Men's event
4. Escaramuza (Women Skirmish) - Women's events
5. Jineteo de Toro (Bull Riding) - Men's event
6. Terna en el Ruedo (Team of Three) - Men's event
7. Jineteo de Yegua (Wild Mare Bronc Riding) - Men's event
8. Manganas a Pie (On Feet Roping) - Men's event
9. Manganas a Caballo (Horseback Roping) - Men's event
10. El Paso de la Muerte (The Pass of Death) - Men's event

== National Charro Championship and Congress ==
The National Charro Championship and Congress (Congreso y Campeonato Nacional Charro in Spanish) is a 17-day event where charro and escaramuza teams from all of Mexico and the United States compete at a national level organized by the Mexican Federation of Charreria.

In 2021, over 150 teams competed in the host city of Aguascalientes. Team Rancho El Quevedeño from the state of Nayarit were the national grand champions of 2021 with a final score of 330 points, Team Rancho Las Cuatas, also from Nayarit, were the runner-ups with 312 points, and Team Charros de La Laguna “A” from the state of Durango were in third place with 303 points. Team Soles del Desierto from the state of Chihuahua were crowned national escaramuza queens with 309.33 points, Team Sanmarqueña from Aguascalientes were the runner-ups with 306.66 points, and third place was E.M.T Rancho El Herradero from Jalisco with 290.66 points. José Andrés Aceves Aceves from Nayarit, was titled 2021 King of Charros Completos. The formal award ceremony was headed by the Constitutional Governor of the State of Aguascalientes, C.P. Martín Orozco Sandoval in front of a plethora of San Marcos Arena where the governor also congratulated the 144 teams, 112 escaramuzas and 16 charros completos that participated from all 32 states of Mexico and other countries.

Prizes for charreria championships can include things such as saddles, horse trailers, trophies or sometimes money. Although most charros do it without an economic incentive (in fact they end up paying to charrear, as happens in other amateur sports), there are people who fully dedicate themselves to charreria and live from it. The salary of a professional charro is variable. A charro can earn up to 20 or 25 thousand mexican pesos a month.

== Teams and associations ==
The charros are grouped into associations registered in the Federación Mexicana de Charrería (Mexican Federation of Charrería founded on December 16, 1933). Such associations are teams or squads in which the charros are organized for practices and competitions, and on some occasions to raise funds for the construction or purchase of facilities. Escaramuzas (women charro groups) are organized in a similar fashion where it is made up of eight official members and each participant must belong to the Mexican Federation of Charrería and comply with the norms established by the institution. In order to compete in a charreada, all associations must be licensed by the federation, and competitors must be certified as charros. There are presently over 100 charro associations in the United States.

== Anthem ==
On Sunday, October 14, 2012, within the framework of the inauguration of the LXIII National Charro Congress in Zacatecas, the Governor of the State, Miguel Alonso Reyes and the president of the Mexican Federation of Charrería, Jaime Castruita Padilla, signed the agreement in which the Mexican Federation of Charrería adopted the lyrics and music of the "Marcha Zacatecas" as the National Charro Anthem. A song composed by Genaro Codina in 1892.

Marcha Zacatecas (instrumental)

== See also ==
- Charro
- Lienzo charro
- Charro outfit
- Escaramuza charra
- Trick roping
- Jaripeo
- Rodeo
- Mariachi
- Banda music
- List of equestrian sports
