= Jaripeo =

Bull-riding sports

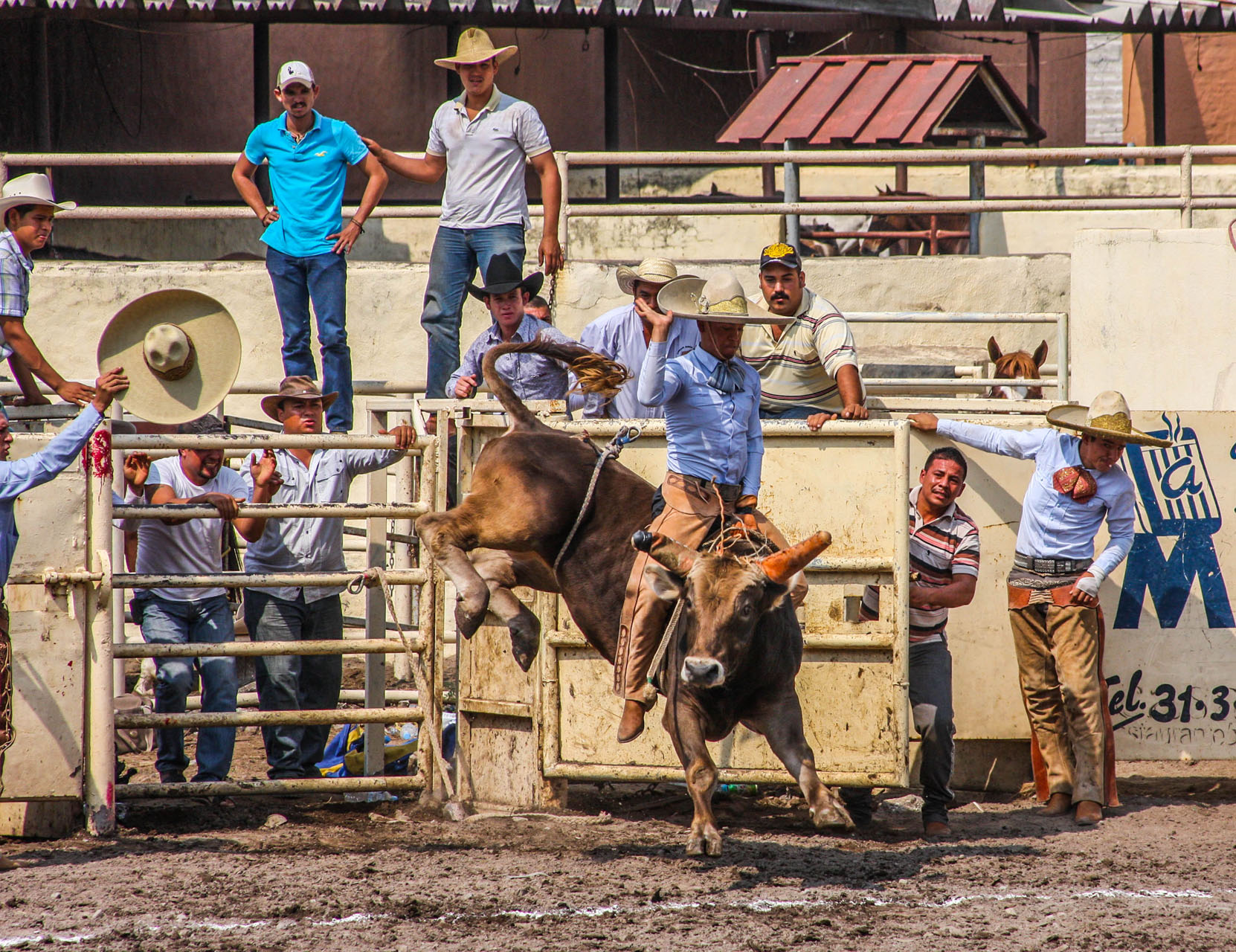
Bull rider at a jaripeo in Colima, Mexico

The word Jaripeo (Spanish: [xaɾiˈpeo]) refers to a form of rodeo, particularly bull riding practiced in some Latin American countries.

In Mexico, mainly in the country's central and southern regions, jaripeo refers to the bull-riding events where bucking bulls are attempted to be ridden until they tire and stop bucking or until they buck off their riders. American-style bull riding, where riders attempt to stay mounted on bucking bulls for only eight seconds before dismounting is also practiced in Mexico. However, it is more common in the country's northern regions.

Jaripeo events where bucking bulls are attempted to be ridden until they stop bucking also exist in Honduras and Chile.

In Guatemala and El Salvador, American-style bull riding is practiced, though in said countries it is known as jaripeo.

Events where bucking bulls are attempted to be ridden until they stop bucking also exist in Nicaragua, Costa Rica, and Panama, yet in said countries they are known as corridas de toros (bullfights).

Jaripeo developed in the 16th century and originally involved riding fighting bulls to the death, but later evolved to where contestants attempt to ride bucking bulls until the animals tire and stop bucking. Jaripeos traditionally take place in lienzos charros (also known as toriles), or bullrings, but can also take place in modern arenas.

== History ==
The word jaripeo derived from the Purépecha language in the Mexican state of Michoacán comes from Xarhipeo, the name of a village in said state. Dating back to 16th century Mexico, jaripeo was originally a form of bull fighting in which the rider rode the bull to death. The jaripeo later evolved to be seen as a test of courage rather than to just simply ride the bull to death. The modern objective of this event is to attempt to ride the bull until it becomes tame and stops bucking or until the bull bucks off the rider. At the present time, most of the occasions these events are organized are during the fiestas patronales, festivities that celebrate the religious entity that represents the town. Those in charge of organizing the jaripeos are usually the local government and ranchers from the region.

== Traditions ==
=== Prayer ===
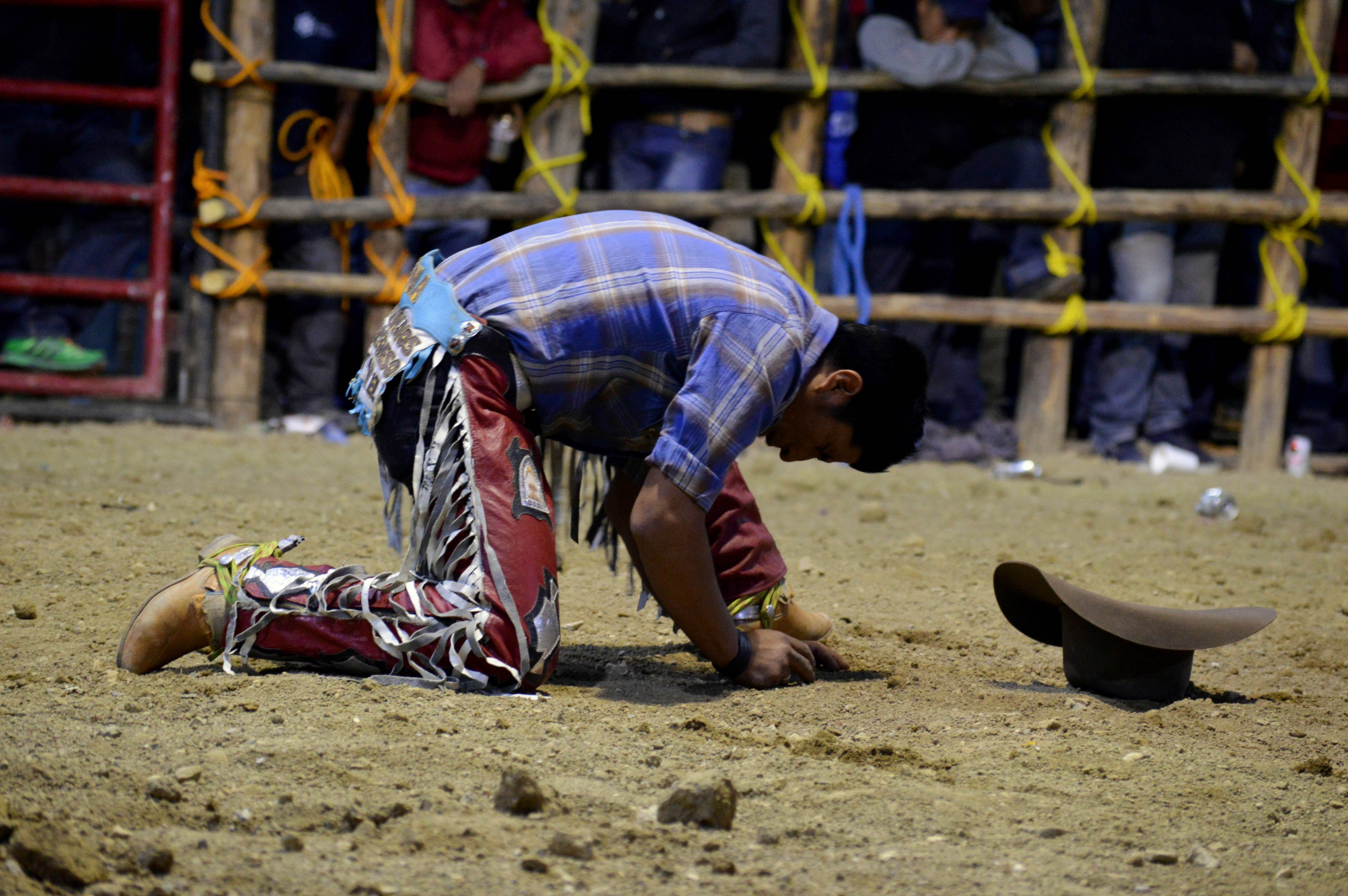
Mexican rider doing a prayer before beginning his event

At the start of a jaripeo, oftentimes all of the participants and entertainers gather together while the announcer of the event recites a prayer called La Oracion del Jinete which loosely translates to The Rider's Prayer. This prayer is said to clarify the line between life and death and serves as a reminder of how dangerous this event can be for the riders.

=== Las reinas ===
Las Reinas del Jaripeo or The queens are the feminine side of a jaripeo event. Traditionally, las reinas were typically a group of three to four young ladies who recently turned 15 years old. Being a reina implicated social recognition and served as a way to present these young girls into society almost like how they do in a fiesta de quinceañera. Las reinas enter on horseback wearing long, colorful, traditional Mexican dresses, greeting the public while followed by about a dozen men on horseback. They do a circle around the arena before ultimately coming to a stop at the center where the jinetes are then presented.

=== Jinetes ===
Jinetes or riders are the main event at jaripeos. They wear leather chaps and overall bright attire. Jinetes are people, usually men, who do bull or horseback riding. On some occasions, the jinetes compete with each other. The format used to qualify each one and choose a winner consists of seeing how long the jinete lasts on top of the animal.

== Regional Mexican jaripeo styles ==
=== Charro style ===
The Charro style is the oldest of the different modern jaripeo variations. It is normally part of the multiple-event charreada, Mexico's national sport, where it is known as jineteo de toro (bull riding in Spanish), but can also be held as a stand-alone event.

=== Lazo style ===
The Lazo style is the most widely practiced in all of jaripeo. It is traditionally practiced in central and southern Mexico.

=== Grapa style ===
The Grapa style (also known as Colima) comes from the central-western state of Colima. It is traditionally practiced in the same regions as the lazo style.

=== San Luis Potosí style ===
The San Luis Potosi style (or simply San Luis) comes from the north-central state of San Luis Potosí. It is traditionally practiced in said state as well as some regions of neighboring states.

=== American style ===
American-style bull riding, where riders attempt to ride a bucking bull for only eight seconds before dismounting, was influenced by the Charro style in the Mexican charreada. It is traditionally practiced in the northern and central regions of Mexico; held in a complete American-style rodeo or as a stand-alone event. It is the most famous version of bull riding worldwide.
