= Lienzo charro =

Type of arena

A lienzo charro (plural lienzos charros) is an arena where charros hold the events of charreada, coleadero and jaripeo. American rodeo events may also take place at a lienzo charro.

A lienzo has two areas: one 60 by 12 metres (197 ft × 39 ft) and a second, circular area 40 metres (130 ft) in diameter. Charreada is a team competition in which teams go head-to-head to win points in different competitions. The team with the most points at the end wins. The coleadero, also known as the torneo de colas, is a multi- or single-competitor event in which a mounted charro throws a bull to the ground by catching its tail, wrapping it under his leg, and making a turn. The lienzo charro may be enclosed to accommodate jaripeo competitions, as well as American rodeo events.
