= Escaramuza charra =

Female equestrian event in charrería

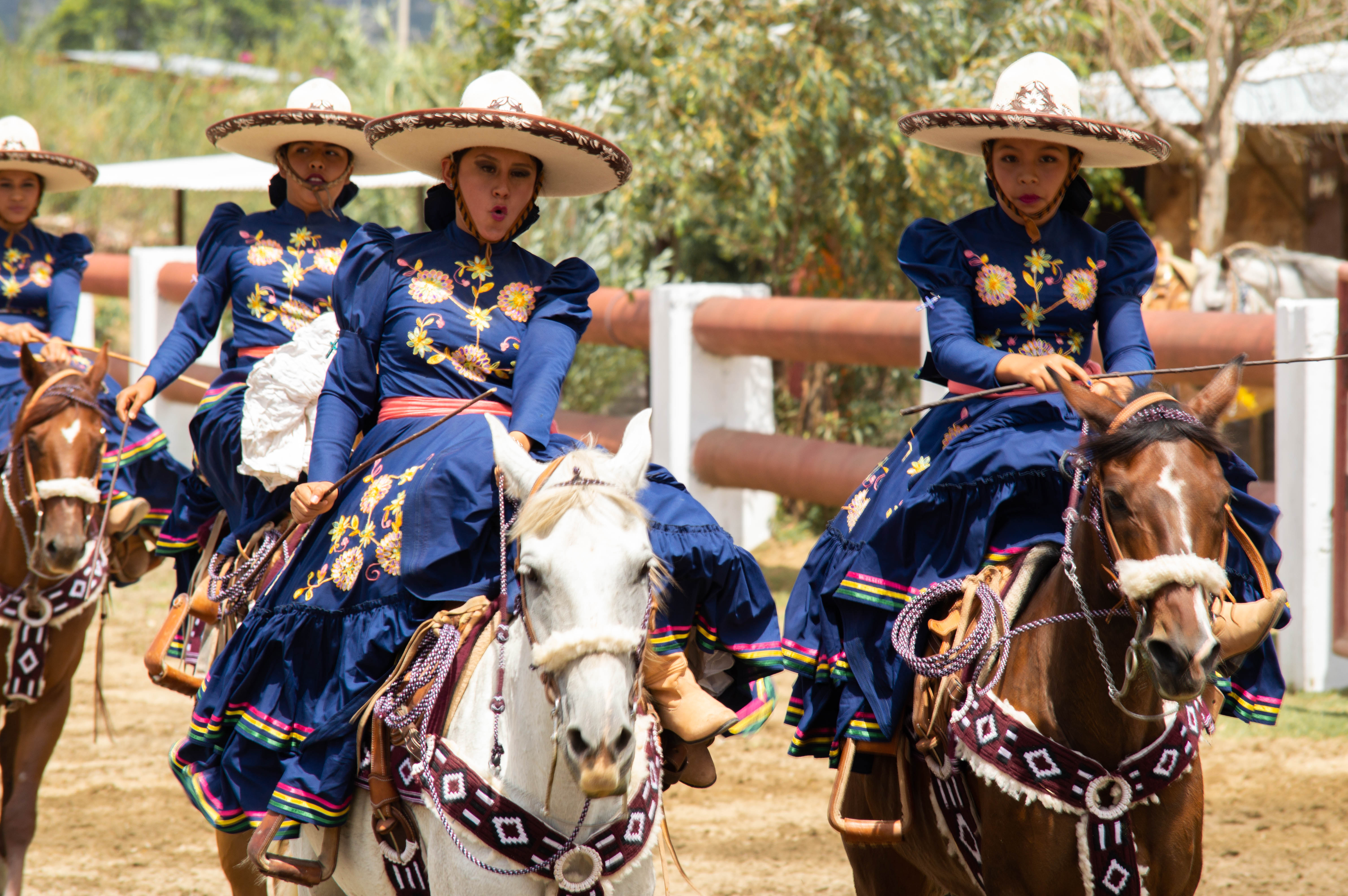
Escaramuza charra in Oaxaca

Escaramuza charra is the only female equestrian event in the Mexican charrería. The escaramuza means "skirmish" and consists of a team riding horses in choreographed synchronized maneuvers to music. The women ride side-saddle and wear traditional Mexican outfit that include sombreros, dresses, and matching accessories. A team consists of 16 women, but only 8 ride at a time. The routine is practiced in a lienzo, or a circular arena.

The escaramuza season runs from February to November. The U.S. nationals are held on Labor Day weekend, while the grand finales are held in Mexico that brings together over 80 teams from both sides of the border.

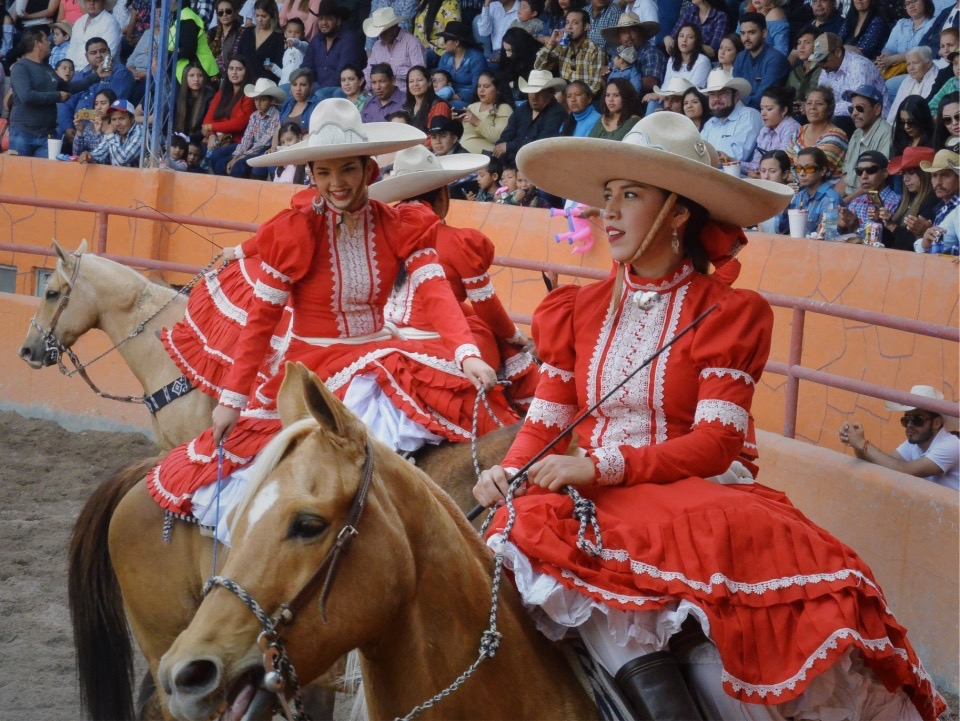
Charras after the ride

== History ==
Charria was inspired by the vaquero culture ranching traditions during the period of colonial Mexico beginning the eighteen century northern and central Mexico. The sport was inspired "by the Mexican adelitas, who fought in the Mexican Revolution." Although charrería is Mexico's national sport, there are charro and escaramuza teams in the United States and Canada.

Typically, rodeo families pass the charro tradition on from father to son, but also have started getting women involved.

== See also ==
- Escaramuza: Riding from the Heart film (2012) http://www.ponyhighway.com/emz.html
- Sands, Katheleen M. (1993). Charrería Mexicana: An Equestrian Folk Tradition. Tucson: University of Arizona Press.
