= Federación Mexicana de Charrería =

FMCh logo

La Federación Mexicana de Charrería (The Mexican Federation of Charreria) regulates charrería events in Mexico. Charrería, officially the National Sport of Mexico, consists of a series of Mexican equestrian events rooted in the horsemanship brought over from Spain during their conquest of the New World. The most noted event is the charreada, or Mexican rodeo.

Originally chartered on December 16, 1933, in Mexico City as the Federación Nacional de Charros (National Federation of Charros), the purpose was to unify all the various charro organizations. The charros had organized themselves during the 1920s to preserve the customs and culture that were quickly disappearing following the breakup of the haciendas by the Mexican revolutionaries.
