= Mexican hat =

A Mexican hat is a sombrero – a broad-brimmed and high-crowned hat.

Mexican hat may also refer to:

- Mexican Hat, Utah, a census-designated place in Utah, USA and/or the balanced rock nearby that resembles an inverted sombrero
- Ratibida columnifera or upright prairie coneflower, a species of wildflower that is native to much of North America
- Kalanchoe daigremontiana or Mexican hat plant, a succulent plant native to Madagascar

== See also ==
- The Jarabe tapatío, the "Mexican Hat Dance"
- The Mexican hat potential, a prescription for the potential energy that leads to the Higgs mechanism
- The Mexican hat wavelet, a continuous wavelet function
- Sombrero (disambiguation)
