= Sombrero (disambiguation) =

A sombrero is a type of wide-brimmed hat.

Sombrero may also refer to:

- Sombrero Key (reef), a coral reef in the Florida Keys National Marine Sanctuary
- Sombrero, Anguilla, a British overseas island in the Lesser Antilles
- Sombrero Galaxy, a spiral galaxy in the constellation Virgo
- Sombrero (film), a 1953 film starring Ricardo Montalbán, Pier Angeli, Vittorio Gassman and Cyd Charisse
- Sombrero Festival, an annual celebration held jointly by Matamoros, Tamaulipas, Mexico, and Brownsville, Texas, United States

== See also ==
- Sombrero function, in mathematics
- Operation Sombrero of the film Delta Farce (2007)
