= NGC 4504 =

Galaxy in the constellation Virgo

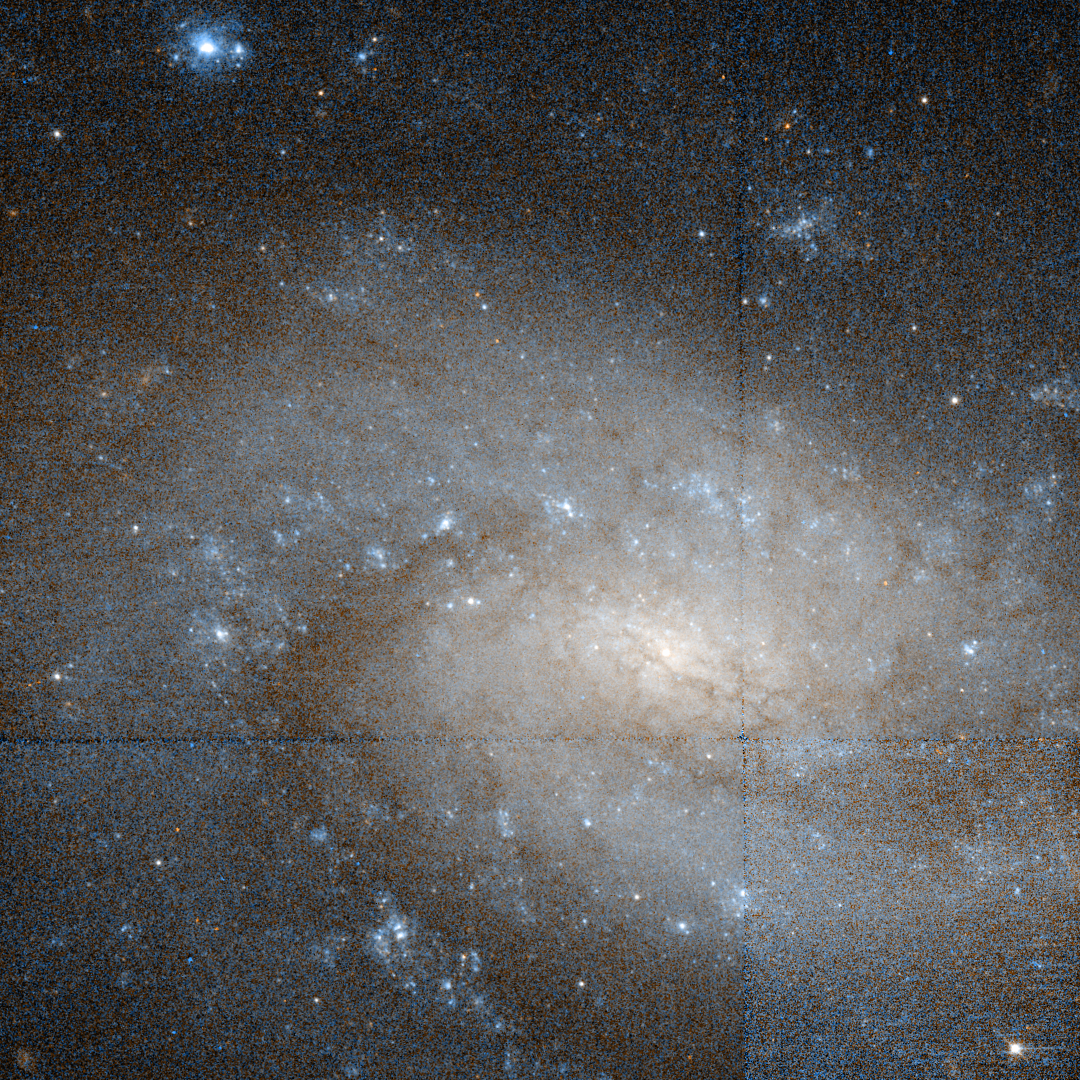
- NGC 4504 imaged by Hubble Space Telescope

Observation data (J2000 epoch)
- Constellation: Virgo
- Right ascension: 12^{h} 32^{m} 17.4095^{s}
- Declination: −07° 33′ 48.897″
- Redshift: 0.003329 ± 0.000002
- Heliocentric radial velocity: 998 ± 1 km/s
- Distance: 55.6 ± 16.9 Mly (17.1 ± 5.2 Mpc)
- Group or cluster: Virgo II Groups
- Apparent magnitude (V): 13.2

Characteristics
- Type: SA(s)cd
- Size: ~71,000 ly (21.7 kpc) (estimated)
- Apparent size (V): 4.4′ × 2.7′

Other designations
- IRAS 12296-0717, MCG -01-32-022, PGC 41555

NGC 4504 is a spiral galaxy in the constellation Virgo. The galaxy lies about 55 million light years away from Earth, which means, given its apparent dimensions, that NGC 4504 is approximately 70,000 light years across. It was discovered by William Herschel on March 20, 1789.

NGC 4504 has a point source nucleus embedded in a highly elliptical bulge. It is possible there is a small bar in the bulge. The galaxy has very low surface brightness arms emerging from the bulge. HII regions are visible in the disk, the largest of which are more than 3 arcseconds across. The star formation rate is estimated to be 0.45 M_{☉} per year based on the H-alpha emission. The galaxy has a small bar 0.36 arcminutes long and a ring with a diameter 0.93 arcminutes. In the nucleus of the galaxy lies a nuclear star cluster which has a radius of 4 arcseconds.

NGC 4504 forms a pair with NGC 4487, which lies 35 arcminutes away. NGC 4504 is a member of the Messier 104 Group, which also includes the Sombrero Galaxy (M104), NGC 4487, UGCA 287, and UGCA 289. A. M. Garcia considers the galaxy part of the LGG 293 Group, in which are included the galaxies NGC 4487, NGC 4504, and NGC 4597. It is part of a Virgo II Groups, a chain of groups extending from the Virgo Cluster.

== Gallery ==
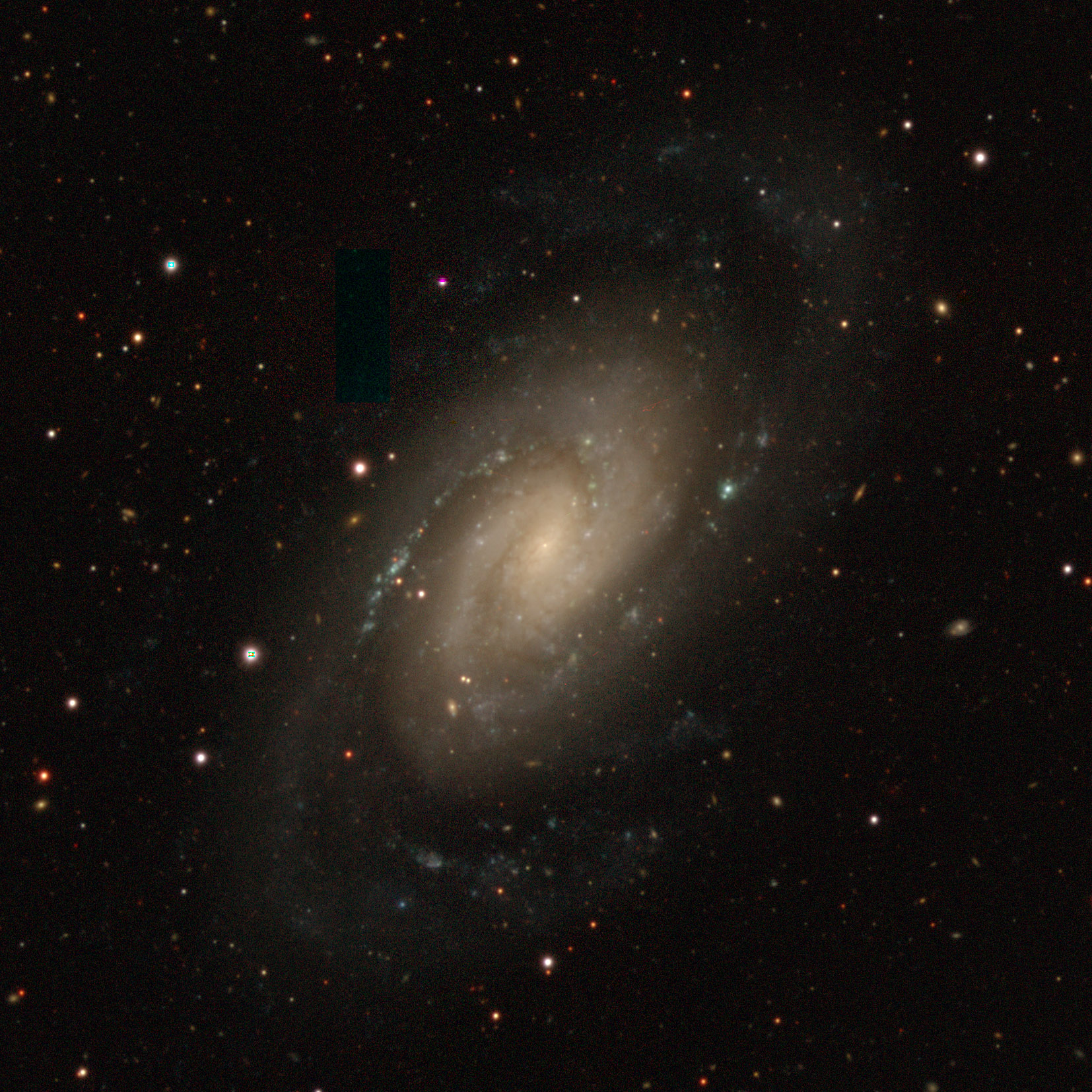
NGC 4504 by Legacy Surveys
