= NGC 7814 =

Galaxy in the constellation Pegasus

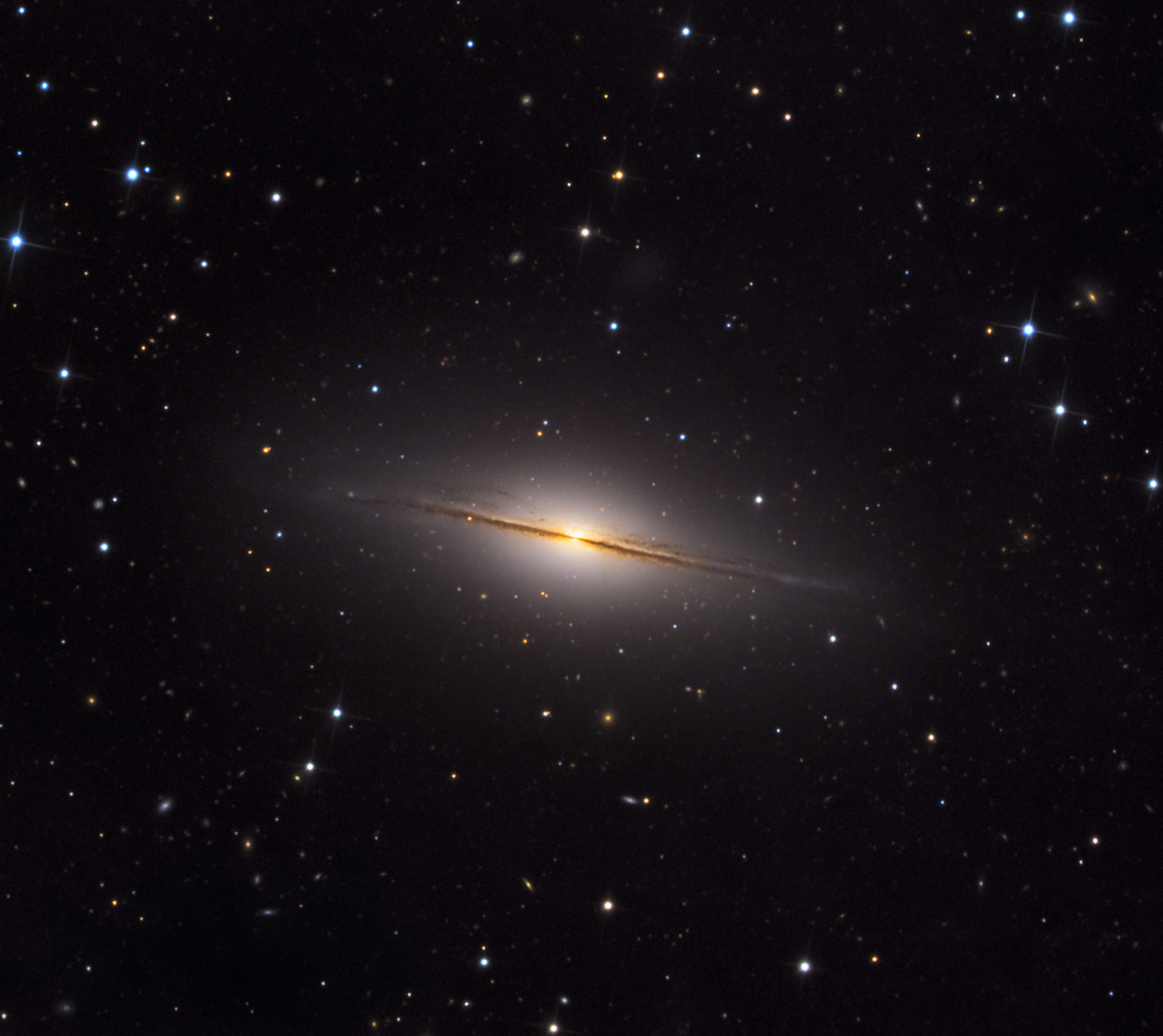
- NGC 7814 by the Mount Lemmon Observatory

Observation data (J2000 epoch)
- Constellation: Pegasus
- Right ascension: 00^{h} 03^{m} 14.9103^{s}
- Declination: +16° 08′ 43.11″
- Heliocentric radial velocity: 1050 ± 4 km/s
- Distance: 40.0 ± 2.6 Mly (12.2 ± 0.8 Mpc)
- Apparent magnitude (V): 11.6

Characteristics
- Type: SA(S)ab
- Size: ~104,500 ly (32.04 kpc) (estimated)
- Apparent size (V): 5.5′ × 2.3′

Other designations
- Caldwell 43, IRAS F00006+1552, UGC 8, MCG +03-01-020, PGC 218, CGCG 456-024

NGC 7814 (also known as UGC 8 or Caldwell 43) is a spiral galaxy about 40 million light-years away in the constellation Pegasus. The galaxy is seen edge-on from Earth. It is sometimes referred to as "the little sombrero", a miniature version of Messier 104. The star field behind NGC 7814 is known for its density of faint, remote galaxies as can be seen in the image here, in the same vein as the Hubble Deep Field.

It is among the few bright galaxies that exhibit modest distortion and twisting of the galaxy's plane in optical wavelengths. The light from the distant background galaxies becomes more red as it passes through NGC 7814's halo. This has been used to determine the amount of gas and dust in the halo.

One supernova has been observed in NGC 7814: SN 2021rhu (Type Ia, mag 15.66) was discovered by Automatic Learning for the Rapid Classification of Events (ALeRCE) on 1 July 2021.

== See also ==
- Sombrero Galaxy
- List of NGC objects (7001–7840)
