= NGC 4487 =

Galaxy in the constellation Virgo

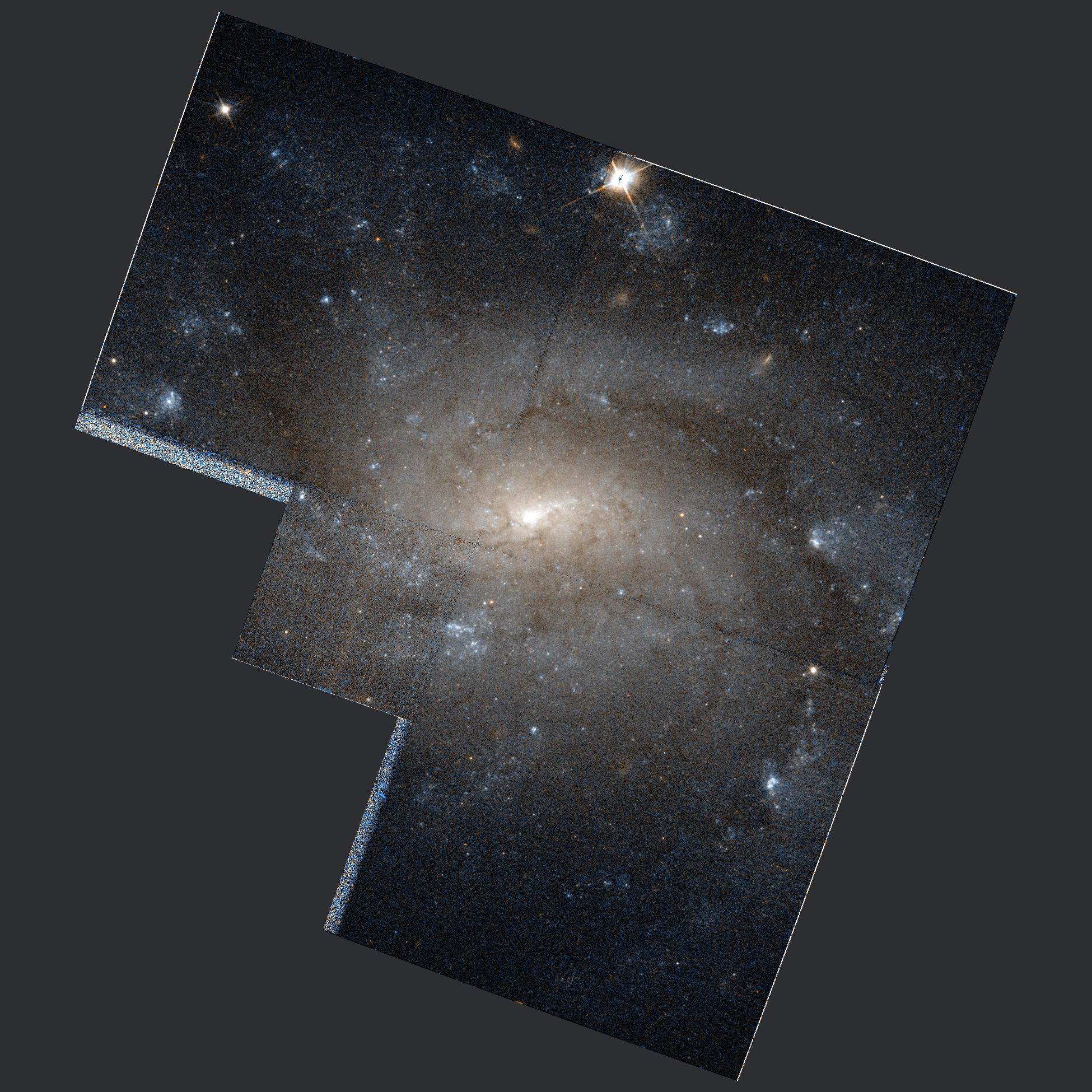
- NGC 4487 imaged by Hubble Space Telescope

Observation data (J2000 epoch)
- Constellation: Virgo
- Right ascension: 12^{h} 31^{m} 04.4322^{s}
- Declination: −08° 03′ 14.110″
- Redshift: 0.003456 ± 0.000007
- Heliocentric radial velocity: 1,036 ± 2 km/s
- Distance: 55.3 ± 15.8 Mly (16.9 ± 4.8 Mpc)
- Group or cluster: Virgo II Groups
- Apparent magnitude (V): 11.0

Characteristics
- Type: SAB(rs)cd
- Size: ~67,000 ly (20.6 kpc) (estimated)
- Apparent size (V): 4.2′ × 2.8′

Other designations
- IRAS 12285-0746, MCG -01-32-021, PGC 41399

NGC 4487 is a spiral galaxy in the constellation Virgo. The galaxy lies about 55 million light years away from Earth, which means, given its apparent dimensions, that NGC 4487 is approximately 65,000 light years across. It was discovered by William Herschel on March 23, 1789.

== Characteristics ==
NGC 4487 has an elliptical bulge with a small bar. The nucleus is offset from the centre. The galaxy has faint diffuse spiral arms. Two spiral arms can be discerned with a grand design pattern. Dust lanes are visible along the inner regions of the arms. One arm branches into several broad segments. Many HII regions are visible in the disk, the largest of which are more than 3 arcseconds across.

Based on its X-ray emission the nucleus of the galaxy appears to be active. In the centre of the galaxy lies a supermassive black hole, whose mass is estimated to be 10^{6.46 ± 0.63} (0.6 - 12 million) M_{☉}, based on the pitch angle of the spiral arms. The stars of the galaxy appear to be of intermediate-young age and have very low metallicity. The star formation rate is estimated to be 0.4 M_{☉} per year.

== Supernova ==
One supernova has been observed in NGC 4487:

- SN 2009N was discovered by Kōichi Itagaki on 24 January 2009, at an apparent magnitude of 16.6, located 75" east and 18" north of the center of NGC 4487. It was identified as a Type II supernova. More detailed spectral observations categorised it as a Type II-P, created by the collapse of red supergiant or a yellow supergiant.

== Nearby galaxies ==
NGC 4487 forms a pair with NGC 4504, which lies 35 arcminutes away. NGC 4487 is a member of the Messier 104 Group, which also includes the Sombrero Galaxy (M104), NGC 4504, UGCA 287, and UGCA 289. A. M. Garcia considers the galaxy part of the LGG 293 Group, in which are included the galaxies NGC 4487, NGC 4504, and NGC 4597. It is part of a Virgo II Groups, a chain of groups extending from the Virgo Cluster.

== Gallery ==
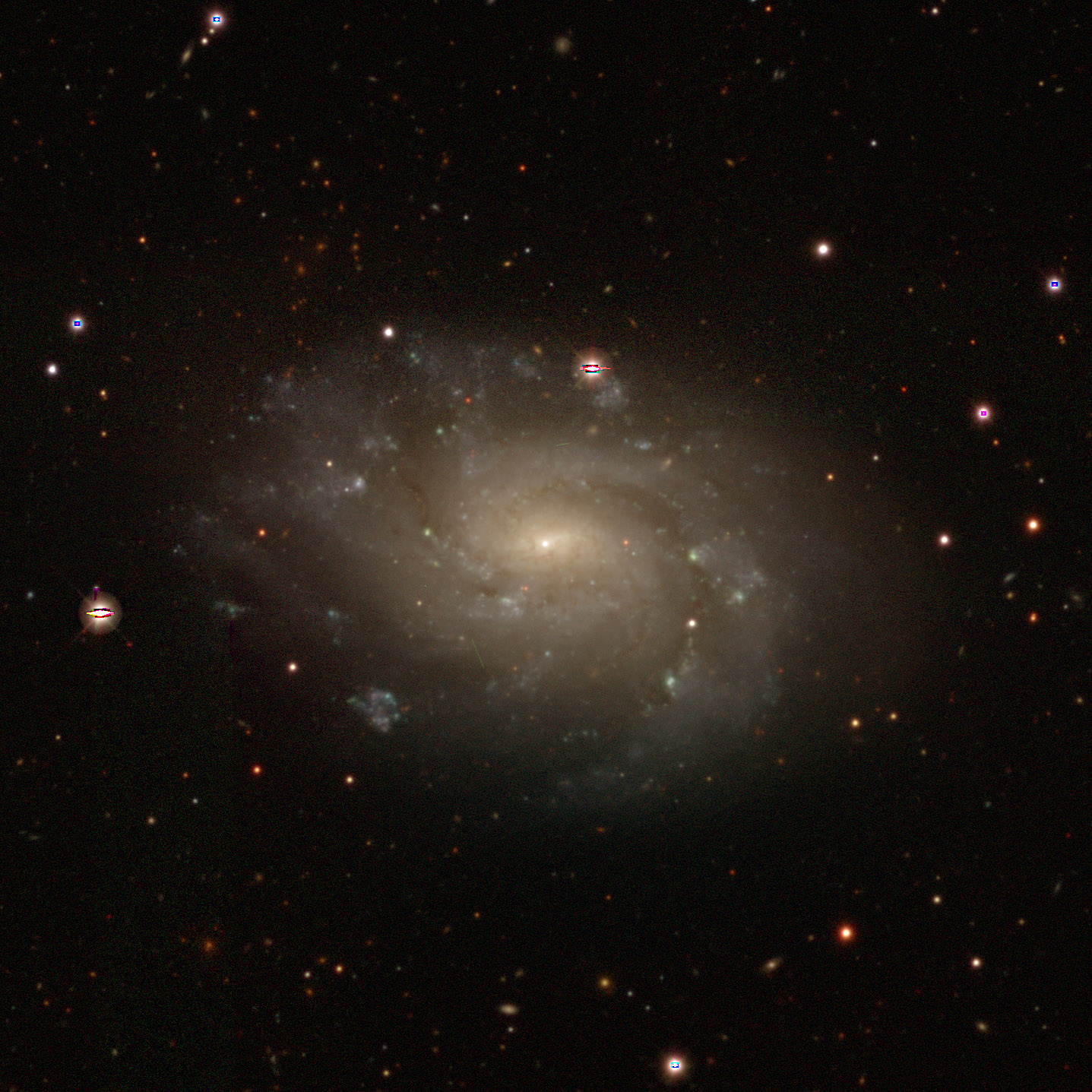
NGC 4487 by Legacy Surveys
