= Sombrero function =

2-dimensional polar coordinate function

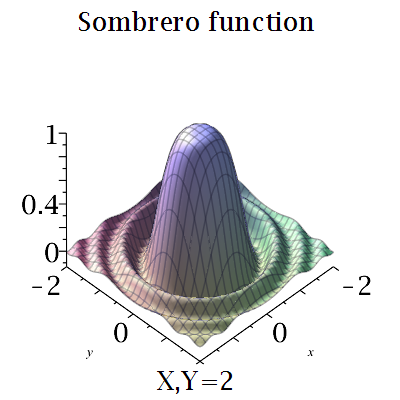
Sombrero function 3D

A sombrero function (sometimes called besinc function or jinc function) is the 2-dimensional polar coordinate analog of the sinc function, and is so-called because it is shaped like a sombrero hat. This function is frequently used in image processing. It can be defined through the Bessel function of the first kind ($J_1$) where ρ^{2} = x^{2} + y^{2}.
$$\operatorname{somb} (\rho) = \frac{2 J_1(\pi \rho)}{\pi \rho}.$$

The normalization factor 2 makes somb(0) = 1. Sometimes the π factor is omitted, giving the following alternative definition:
$$\operatorname{somb} (\rho) = \frac{2 J_1(\rho)}{\rho}.$$

The factor of 2 is also often omitted, giving yet another definition and causing the function maximum to be 0.5:
$$\operatorname{somb} (\rho) = \frac{ J_1(\rho)}{\rho}.$$

The Fourier transform of the 2D circle function ($\operatorname{circ}(\rho)$) is a sombrero function. Thus a sombrero function also appears in the intensity profile of far-field diffraction through a circular aperture, known as an Airy disk.
