= Sombrero Galaxy =

Galaxy in the constellation Virgo

- Image taken by Hubble Space Telescope, April 2025

Observation data (J2000 epoch)
- Constellation: Virgo
- Right ascension: 12^{h} 39^{m} 59.4314^{s}
- Declination: −11° 37′ 23.118″
- Redshift: 0.003416±0.000017
- Heliocentric radial velocity: 1,024±5 km/s
- Galactocentric velocity: 904±7 km/s
- Distance: 9.55 ± 0.31 Mpc (31.1 ± 1.0 Mly)
- Apparent magnitude (V): 8.0

Characteristics
- Type: SA(s)a or E
- Size: 32.32 by 17.45 kiloparsecs (105,400 by 56,900 light-years) (diameter; 2MASS K-band total); 29.09 kiloparsecs (94,900 light-years) (diameter; D_{25.0} B-band isophote)
- Apparent size (V): 9′ × 4′
- Notable features: Unusually bright center, intriguingly detailed dust band

Other designations
- M104, IRAS 12373-1120, NGC 4594, UGCA 293, MCG -02-32-020, PGC 42407

The Sombrero Galaxy (also known as Messier Object 104, M104 or NGC 4594) is a peculiar galaxy of unclear classification in the constellation borders of Virgo and Corvus, being about 9.55 megaparsecs (31.1 million light-years) from the Milky Way galaxy. It is a member of the Virgo II Groups, a series of galaxies and galaxy clusters strung out from the southern edge of the Virgo Supercluster. It has an isophotal diameter of approximately 29.09 to 32.32 kiloparsecs (94,900 to 105,000 light-years), making it slightly larger than the Milky Way.

It has a bright nucleus, an unusually large central bulge, and a prominent dust lane in its outer disk, which from Earth is viewed almost edge-on. The dark dust lane and the bulge give it the appearance of a sombrero hat. Astronomers initially thought the halo was small and light, indicative of a spiral galaxy; but the Spitzer Space Telescope found that the halo was significantly larger and more massive than previously thought, indicative of a giant elliptical galaxy.

The galaxy has an apparent magnitude of +8.0, making it easily visible with amateur telescopes, and is considered by some authors to be the galaxy with the highest absolute magnitude within a radius of 10 megaparsecs of the Milky Way. Its large bulge, central supermassive black hole, and dust lane all attract the attention of professional astronomers.

== Observation history ==
=== Discovery ===
The Sombrero Galaxy was discovered on May 11, 1781 by Pierre Méchain, who described the object in a May 1783 letter to J. Bernoulli that was later published in the Berliner Astronomisches Jahrbuch. Charles Messier made a handwritten note about this and five other objects (now collectively recognized as M104 – M109) to his personal list of objects now known as the Messier Catalogue, but it was not "officially" included until 1921. William Herschel independently discovered the object in 1784 and additionally noted the presence of a "dark stratum" in the galaxy's disc, what is now called a dust lane. Later astronomers were able to connect Méchain's and Herschel's observations.

=== Designation as a Messier object ===
In 1921, Camille Flammarion found Messier's personal list of the Messier objects including the hand-written notes about the Sombrero Galaxy. This was identified with object 4594 in the New General Catalogue, and Flammarion declared that it should be included in the Messier Catalogue. Since this time, the Sombrero Galaxy has been known as M104.

== Dust ring ==
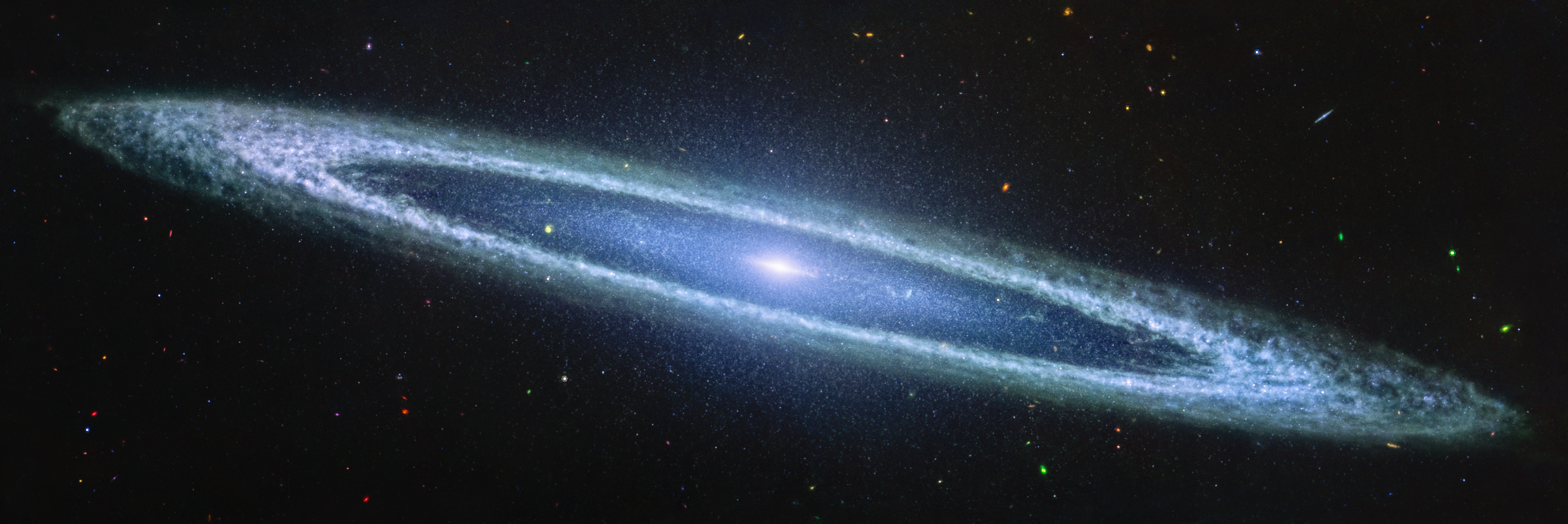
M104 captured by the James Webb Space Telescope's Mid-Infrared Instrument in 2024

As noted above, this galaxy's most striking feature is the dust lane that crosses in front of the bulge of the galaxy. This dust lane is actually a symmetrical ring that encloses the bulge of the galaxy. Most of the cold atomic hydrogen gas and the dust lie within this ring. The ring might also contain most of the Sombrero Galaxy's cold molecular gas, although this is an inference based on observations with low resolution and weak detections. Additional observations are needed to confirm that the Sombrero galaxy's molecular gas is constrained to the ring. Based on infrared spectroscopy, the dust ring is the primary site of star formation within this galaxy.

== Nucleus ==
The nucleus of the Sombrero Galaxy is classified as a low-ionization nuclear emission-line region (LINER). These are nuclear regions where ionized gas is present, but the ions are only weakly ionized (i.e. the atoms are missing relatively few electrons). The source of energy for ionizing the gas in LINERs has been debated extensively. Some LINER nuclei may be powered by hot, young stars found in star formation regions, whereas other LINER nuclei may be powered by active galactic nuclei (highly energetic regions that contain supermassive black holes). Infrared spectroscopy observations have demonstrated that the nucleus of the Sombrero Galaxy is probably devoid of any significant star formation activity. However, a supermassive black hole has been identified in the nucleus (as discussed in the subsection below), so this active galactic nucleus is probably the energy source that weakly ionizes the gas in the Sombrero Galaxy.

=== Central supermassive black hole ===
In the 1990s, a research group led by John Kormendy demonstrated that a supermassive black hole is present within the Sombrero Galaxy. Using spectroscopy data from both the CFHT and the Hubble Space Telescope, the group showed that the speed of revolution of the stars within the center of the galaxy could not be maintained unless a mass 1 billion times that of the Sun (10^{9} M_{☉}) is present in the center. This would make it among the most massive black holes measured in any nearby galaxy, as well as the nearest billion-solar-mass black hole to Earth. However, a 2016 study yielded a lower value of (6.4±0.4)×10^{8} M_{☉}.

=== Synchrotron radiation ===
At radio and X-ray wavelengths, the nucleus is a strong source of synchrotron radiation. Synchrotron radiation is produced when high-velocity electrons oscillate as they pass through regions with strong magnetic fields. This emission is quite common for active galactic nuclei. Although radio synchrotron radiation may vary over time for some active galactic nuclei, the luminosity of the radio emission from the Sombrero Galaxy varies only 10–20%.

=== Unidentified terahertz radiation ===
In 2006, two groups published measurements of the terahertz radiation from the nucleus of the Sombrero Galaxy at a wavelength of 850 μm. This terahertz radiation was found not to originate from the thermal emission from dust (which is commonly seen at infrared and submillimeter wavelengths), synchrotron radiation (which is commonly seen at radio wavelengths), bremsstrahlung emission from hot gas (which is uncommonly seen at millimeter wavelengths), or molecular gas (which commonly produces submillimeter spectral lines). The source of the terahertz radiation remains unidentified.

== Globular clusters ==
The Sombrero Galaxy has a relatively large number of globular clusters, observational studies of which have produced population estimates in the range of 1,200 to 2,000. The ratio of globular clusters to the galaxy's total luminosity is high compared to the Milky Way and similar galaxies with small bulges, but comparable to other galaxies with large bulges. These results have often been used to demonstrate that the number of a galaxy's globular clusters is thought to be related to the size of its bulge. The surface density of the globular clusters generally follows the bulge's light profile, except near the galaxy's center.

== Distance, mass and brightness ==
At least two methods have been used to measure the distance to the Sombrero Galaxy.

The first method relies on comparing the measured fluxes from the galaxy's planetary nebulae to the known luminosity of planetary nebulae in the Milky Way. This method gave the distance to the Sombrero Galaxy as 29 ± 2 Mly (8,890 ± 610 kpc).

The second method is the surface brightness fluctuations method, which uses the grainy appearance of the galaxy's bulge to estimate the distance to it. Nearby galaxy bulges appear very grainy, while more distant bulges appear smooth. Early measurements using this technique gave distances of 30.6 ± 1.3 Mly (9,380 ± 400 kpc). Later, after some refinement of the technique, a distance of 32 ± 3 Mly (9,810 ± 920 kpc) was measured. This was even further refined in 2003 to 29.6 ± 2.5 Mly (9,080 ± 770 kpc).

The average distance measured through these two techniques is 29.3 ± 1.6 Mly (8,980 ± 490 kpc). (Note: average(29.6 ± 2.5, 29 ± 2) = ((29.6 + 29) / 2) ± ((2.5^{2} + 2^{2})^{0.5} / 2) = 29.3 ± 1.6)

The mass of M104 is estimated to be 800 billion solar masses.

The galaxy's absolute magnitude (in the blue) is estimated as −21.9 at 30.6 Mly (9,400 kpc) (−21.8 at the average distance of above)—which, as stated above, makes it the brightest galaxy in a radius of 32.6 Mly (10,000 kpc) around the Milky Way.

A 2016 report used the Hubble Space Telescope to measure the distance to M104 based on the tip of the red-giant branch method, yielding 9.55 ± 0.13 ± 0.31 Mpc.

== Nearby galaxies and galaxy group information ==
The Sombrero Galaxy lies within a complex, filament-like cloud of galaxies that extends to the south of the Virgo Cluster. However, it is unclear whether it is part of a formal galaxy group. Hierarchical methods for identifying groups, which determine group membership by considering whether individual galaxies belong to a larger aggregate of galaxies, typically produce results showing that the Sombrero Galaxy is part of a group that includes NGC 4487, NGC 4504, NGC 4802, UGCA 289, and possibly a few other galaxies. However, results that rely on the percolation method (also known as the friends-of-friends method), which links individual galaxies together to determine group membership, indicate that either the Sombrero Galaxy is not in a group or that it may be only part of a galaxy pair with UGCA 287.

Besides that, M104 is also accompanied by an ultra-compact dwarf galaxy, discovered in 2009, with an absolute magnitude of −12.3, an effective radius of just 47.9 ly (3.03 million astronomical units), and a mass of 3.3×10^{7} M_{☉}.

== Amateur astronomy ==
The Sombrero Galaxy is 11.5° west of Spica and 5.5° north-east of Eta Corvi. Although it is visible with 7×35 binoculars or a 4-inch (100 mm) amateur telescope, an 8-inch (200 mm) telescope is needed to distinguish the bulge from the disk, and a 10- or 12-inch (250 or 300 mm) telescope to see the dark dust lane.

== Gallery ==
M104 imaged by James Webb Space Telescope's NIRCam in 2025

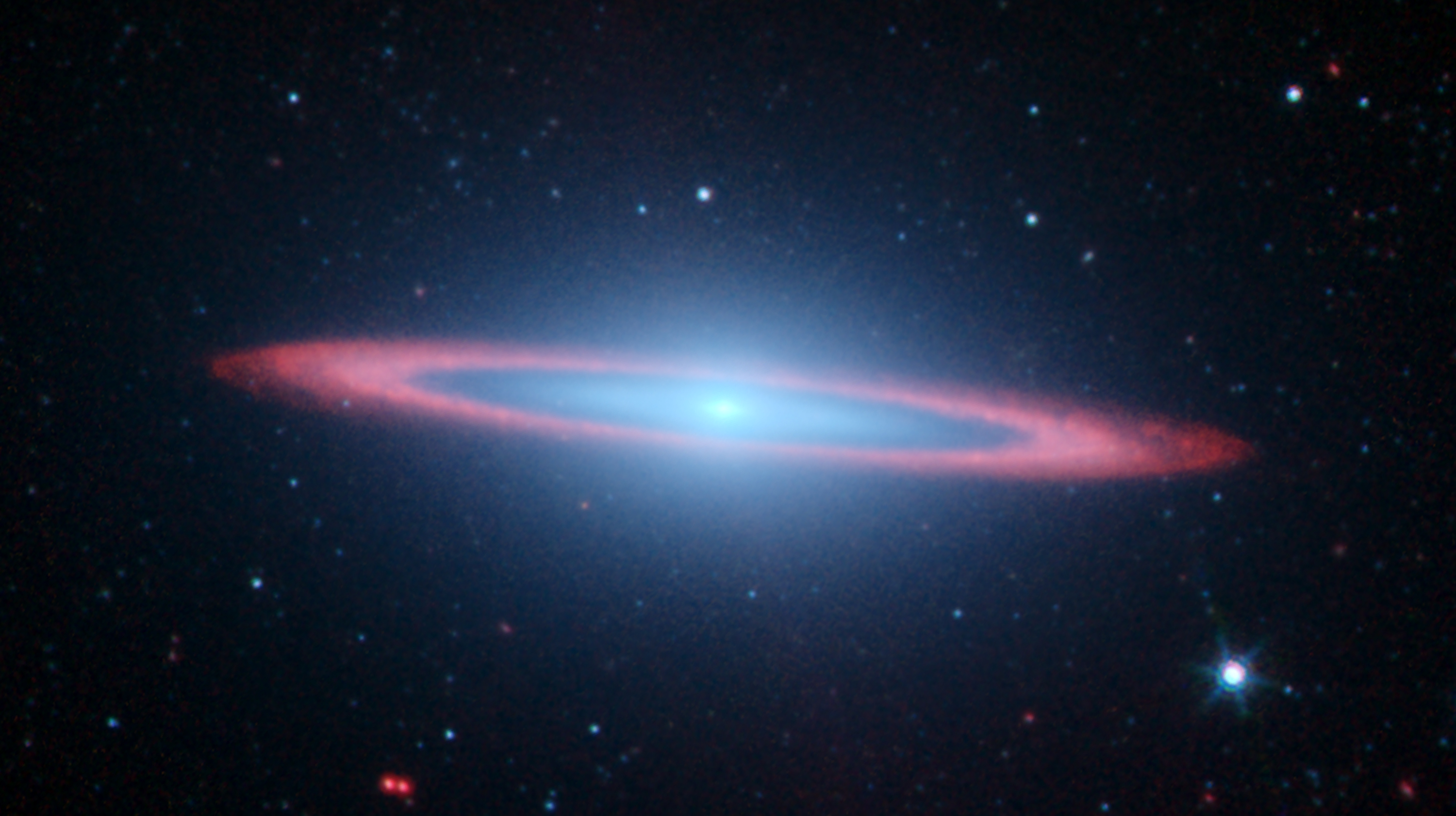
M104 in infrared by the Spitzer Space Telescope

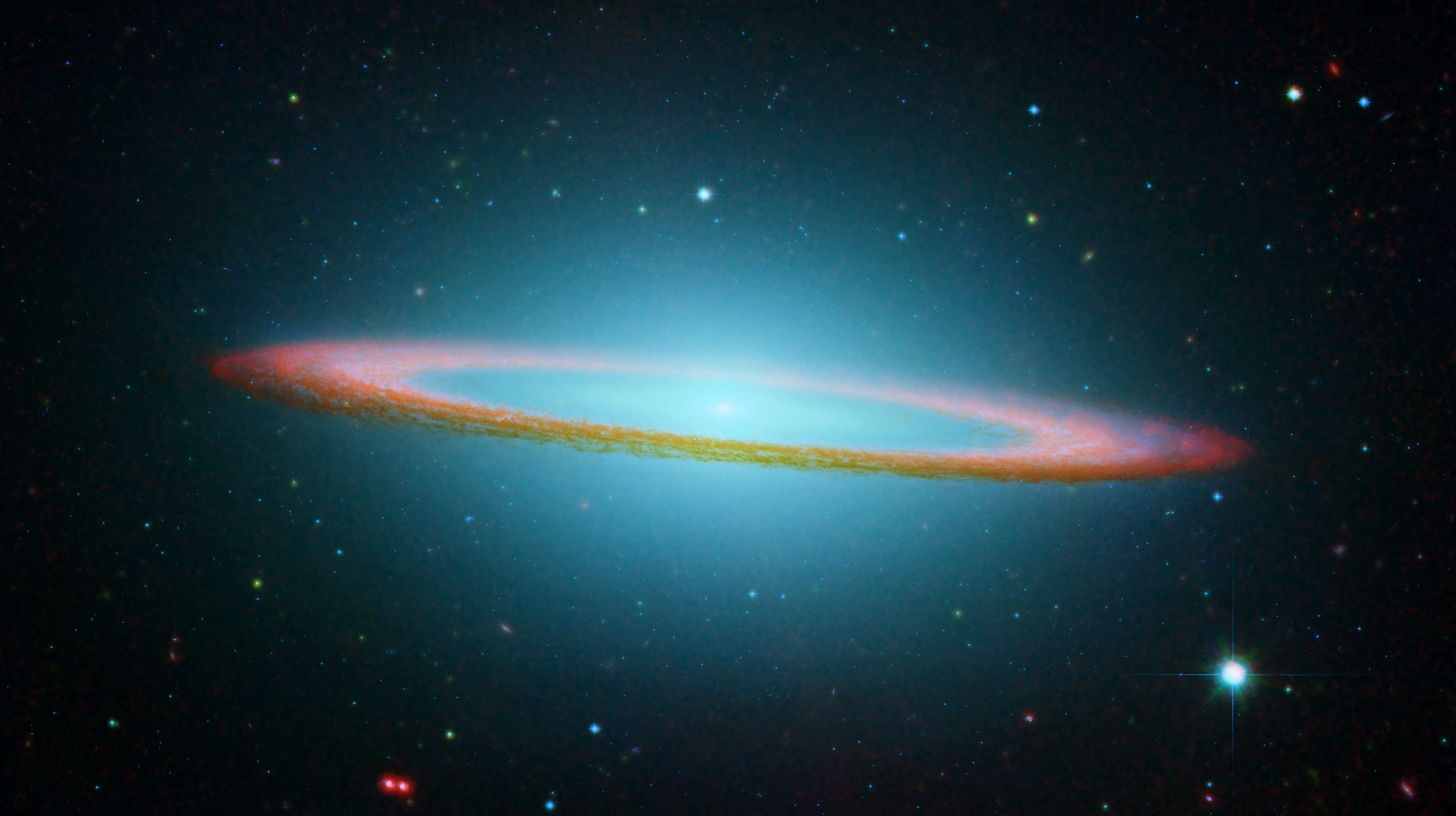
M104 in infrared light by the Hubble Space Telescope and the Spitzer Space Telescope

M104 imaged by the Víctor M. Blanco Telescope, showing the galaxy's enormous glowing halo

== See also ==
- List of Messier objects
- Lists of astronomical objects
- NGC 1167, another LINER galaxy
- NGC 1291, a galaxy with an outer dust ring
- NGC 4725, a similar galaxy with an extended dust ring
- NGC 6027a, a member of Seyfert's Sextet with a very similar dust ring structure
- NGC 7742, a spiral galaxy with a similar dust ring
- NGC 7814, a galaxy sometimes referred to as "the little sombrero"
- Ring galaxy
- Messier object
- New General Catalogue
