= Sombrero =

Traditional Mexican folk hat

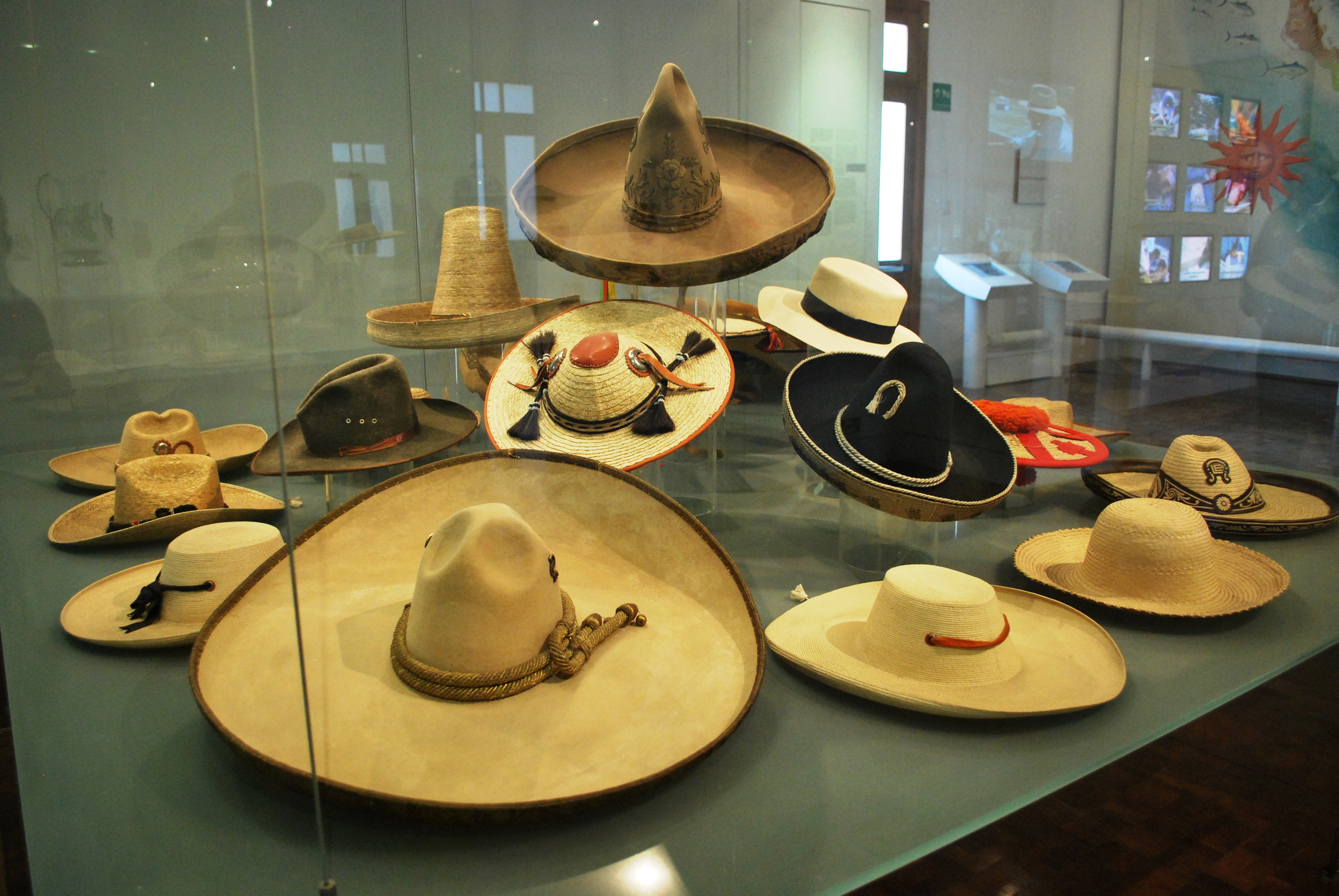
- Various sombreros on display at the Museo de Arte Popular in Mexico City
- Type: Hat
- Place of origin: Mexico

A sombrero (Spanish for 'hat', lit. 'shadower'; Spanish: [somˈbɾeɾo]), sombrero de charro or sombrero jarano, is a type of wide-brimmed hat used to shield the face and eyes from the sun. It usually has a high, pointed crown; an extra-wide brim (broad enough to cast a shadow over the head, neck, and shoulders of the wearer), that is slightly upturned at the edge; and a chin strap to hold it in place. It is strongly associated with the culture of Mexico. (Note: Attributed to multiple sources.)

In Mexico, this hat type is known as a sombrero de charro ('charro hat', referring to the traditional Mexican horsemen), or sombrero jarano 'hat of jara', jara ('cistus') being a shrub from which the hats were first made. For most English speakers, the word sombrero – alone, without a qualifier or descriptor – is usually understood to refer to this traditional Mexican headwear; in Spanish, a sombrero may be used for any style of hat. (Note: The term sombrero predates this type of headwear and has been applied to many styles of hat. Other hats known as sombrero can be found in South America and Spain. These include: the Spanish sombrero calañés from Huelva, sombrero cordobés of Córdoba, and sombrero de catite of Andalusia; and the Colombian sombrero vueltiao.)

== Design ==
Sombreros, like cowboy hats, were designed in response to the demands of the physical environment. High crowns provide insulation, and wide brims provide shade. Hot and sunny climates inspire such tall-crowned, wide-brimmed designs, and hats with one or both of these features have evolved again and again in history and across cultures. For example, the Greek petasos of two millennia ago, and the traditional conical hat widespread in different regions of Asia – into modern times – incorporate such heat-mitigating features. Designs specifically for riders on horseback with these details can be seen at least as far back as the Mongolian horsemen of the 13th century. Sombreros, like poblanos, usually include a barboquejo or chin strap.

== Development ==
Its precise evolution is unknown, but it is usually accepted that the Mexican-style sombrero's specific form arose amongst mestizo cowboys in Central Mexico. A candidate for forerunner of the Mexican sombrero form was a style worn by wealthy Spanish landowners of colonial-era Andalusia and Navarre. The Mexican version evolved with an even wider brim and a high, conical crown. These hats became emblematic of mariachi musicians and charros. In the Western United States, the sombrero had a high conical or cylindrical crown with a saucer-shaped brim, highly embroidered and made of plush felt.

=== 18th Century ===
Eighteenth-century images of clothing show a wide variety of hat styles. All were small, with brims of moderate width. The rigidity of the brim varied; some appearing to be flexible and drooping, while others seem stiff. Crowns also varied; all were low, but they could be either flat or rounded. Light colors, such as white and gray, predominated. The only decorative feature was a small ribbon or band around the crown. There is little information regarding materials, but it is inferred that some were made of palm fiber and others of finer materials such as felt.

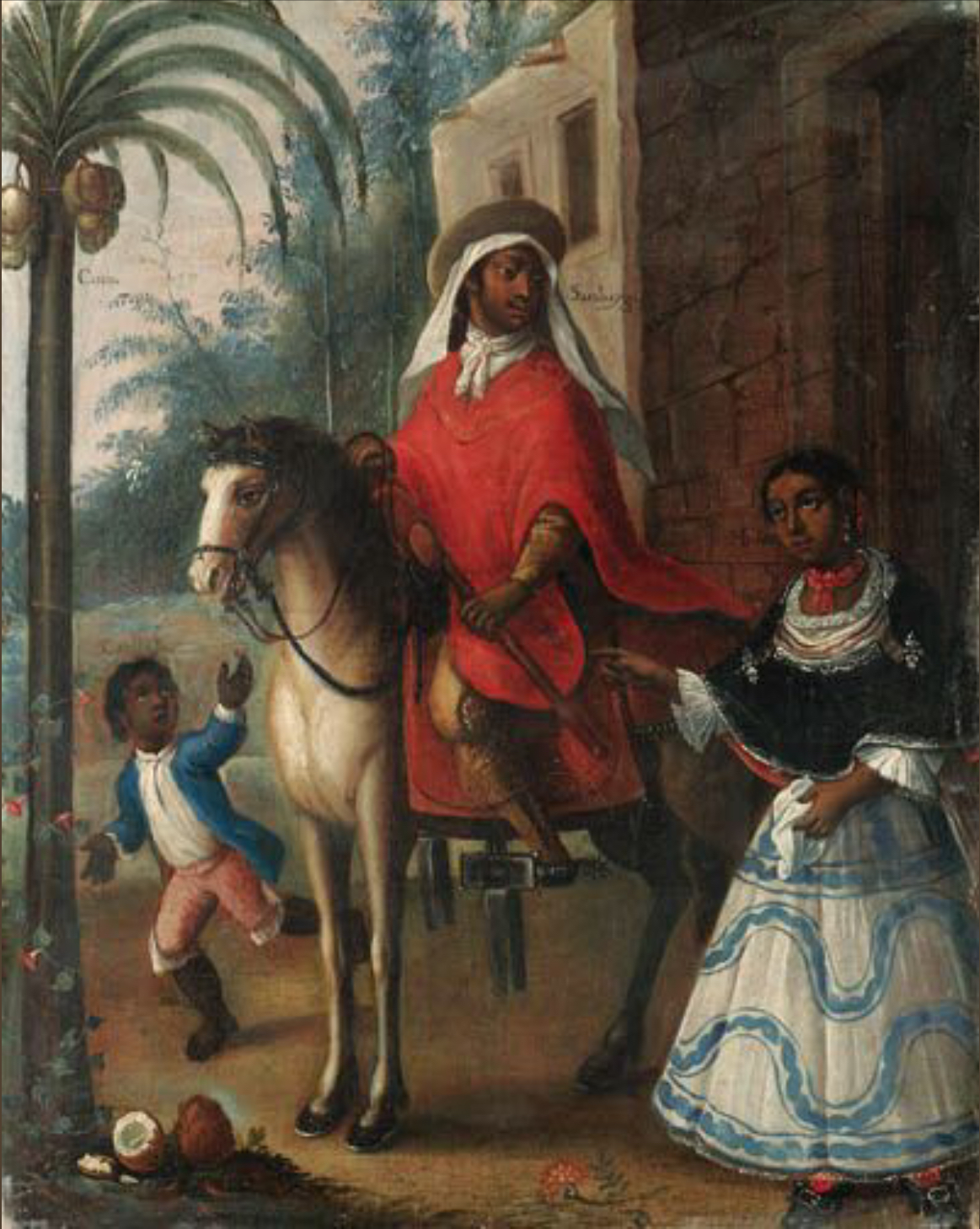
The zambo charro wears a small wide brim sombrero (ca. 1760s)

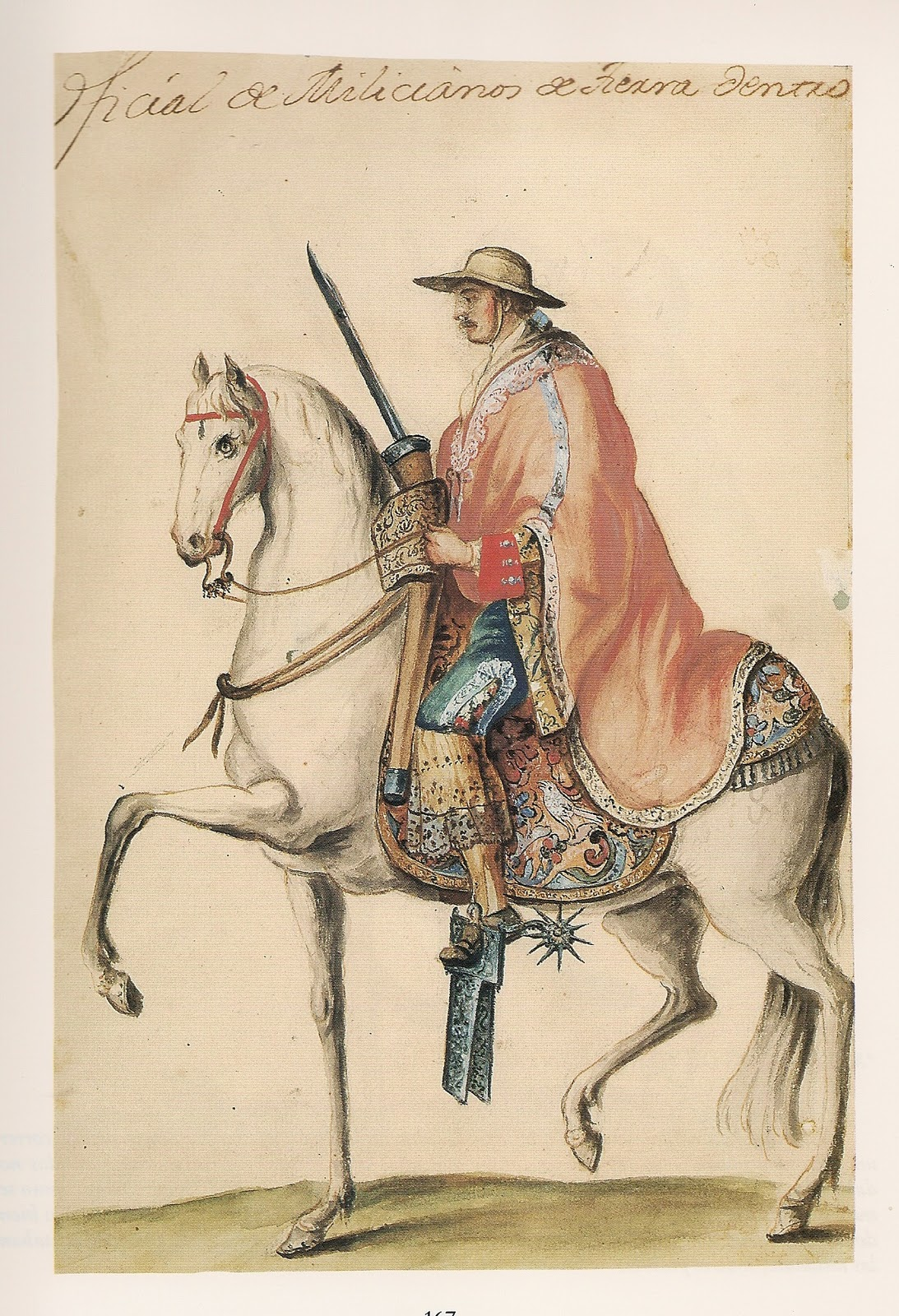
A tierra-adentro militiamen dressed in Charro outfit with a small sombrero with flexible brim

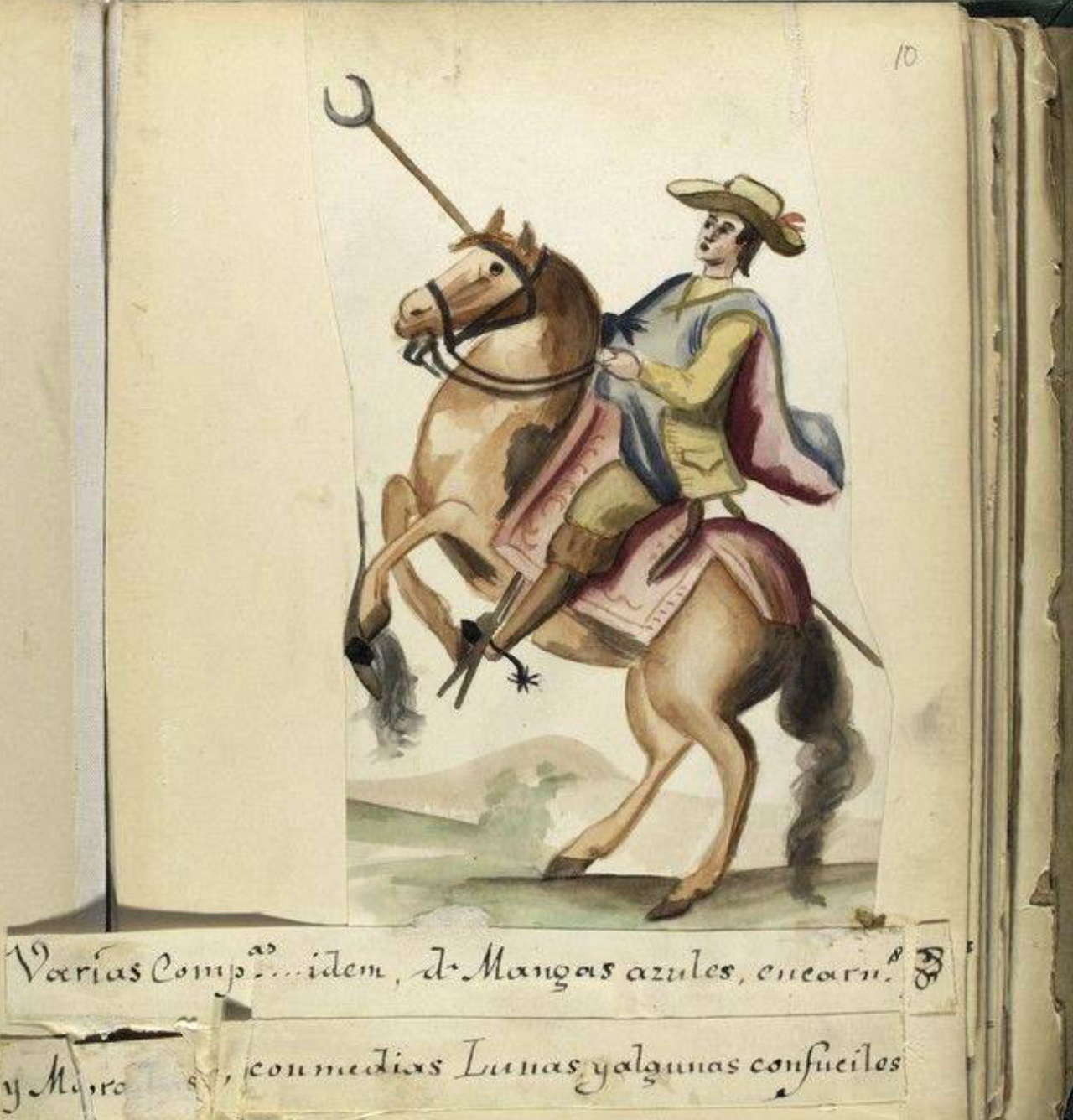
Militiamen dressed in Charro attire with a wide-brimmed hat with the brims upturned (ca. 1770)

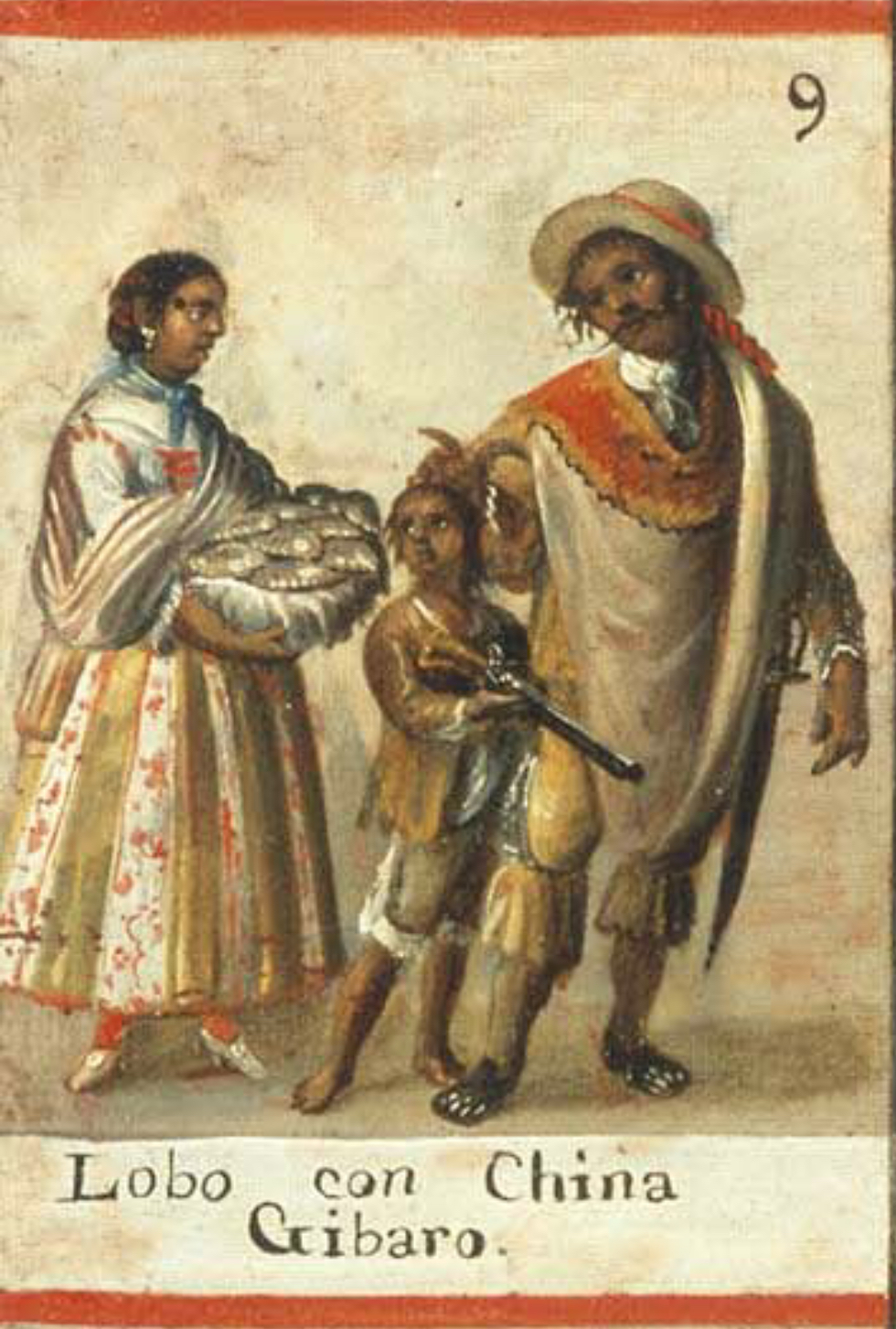
Same type of small sombrero with what appears to be a round crown with a red hatband that drapes behind (c. 1770s)

=== 19th Century ===
In the 19th century the name jarano was first recorded for the Mexican hat. Strictly speaking, it was used to refer to any wide-brimmed hat, regardless of style or construction, and was synonymous with the Spanish word chambergo.

In the first decades of 19th-century Mexico, particularly after independence, the fashion for small hats continued among charros and the wealthy. The brims were now, typically, 6 inches (15 cm) wide; flat, with a very low crown; the hat bands became wider and more prominent, a style that would persist in subsequent decades. Typically, the hats of this decade were made of wool felt, with silver clasps to secure the chin strap. The most prized were those made in the city of Puebla; called Poblanos or jarano Poblano, meaning 'Pueblan' or 'Pueblan-style jarano', with a moderately broad, flat brim, usually worn slouched, and typically of a light, gray, or aplomado ('lead-colored' hue) color, because these colors reflect light and heat.

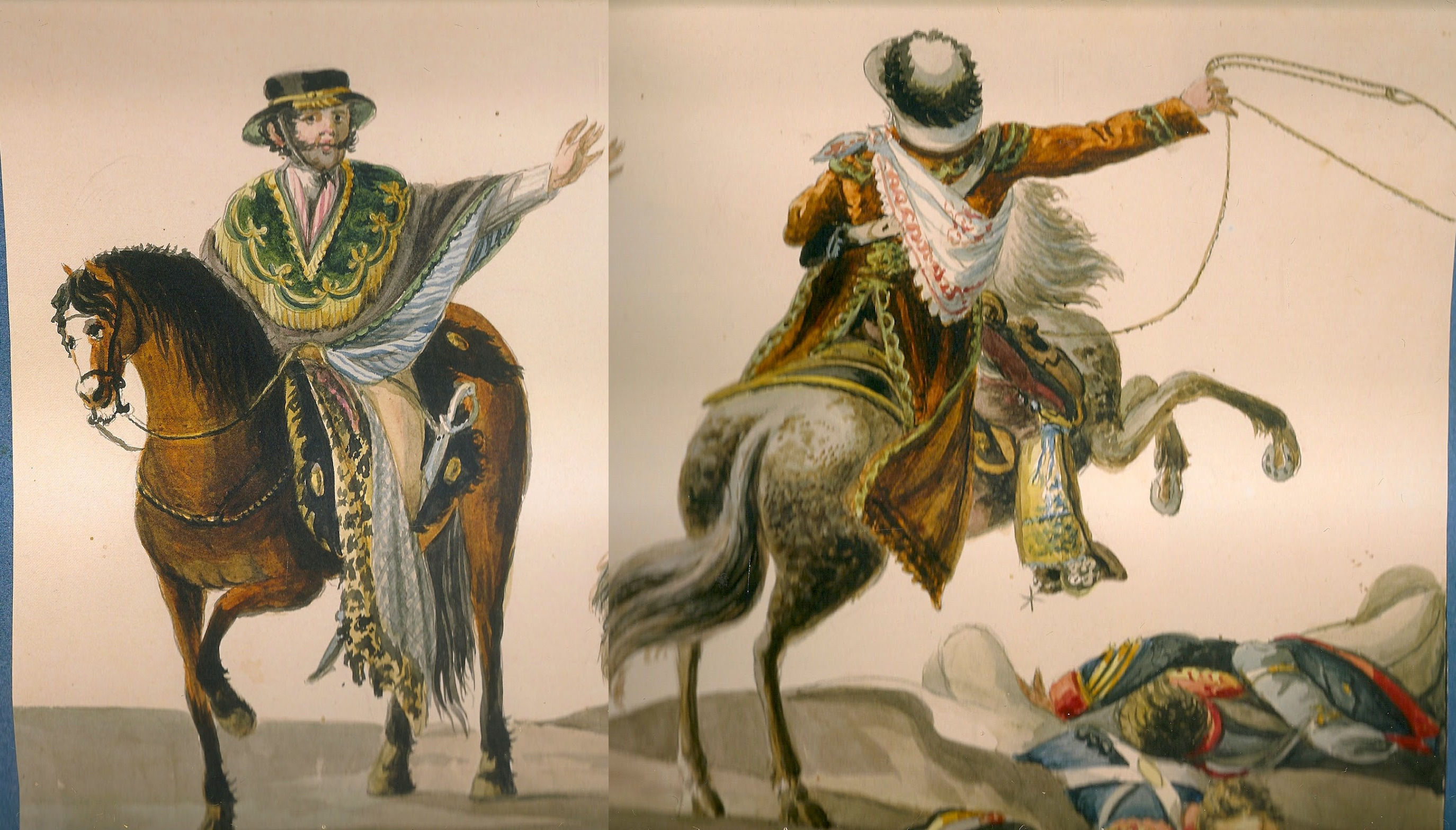
Mexican Charro patriots during the War of Independence wearing a Jarano hat with short, flexible (slouching) brim, low crown and a thick "toquilla" or hatband (1816)

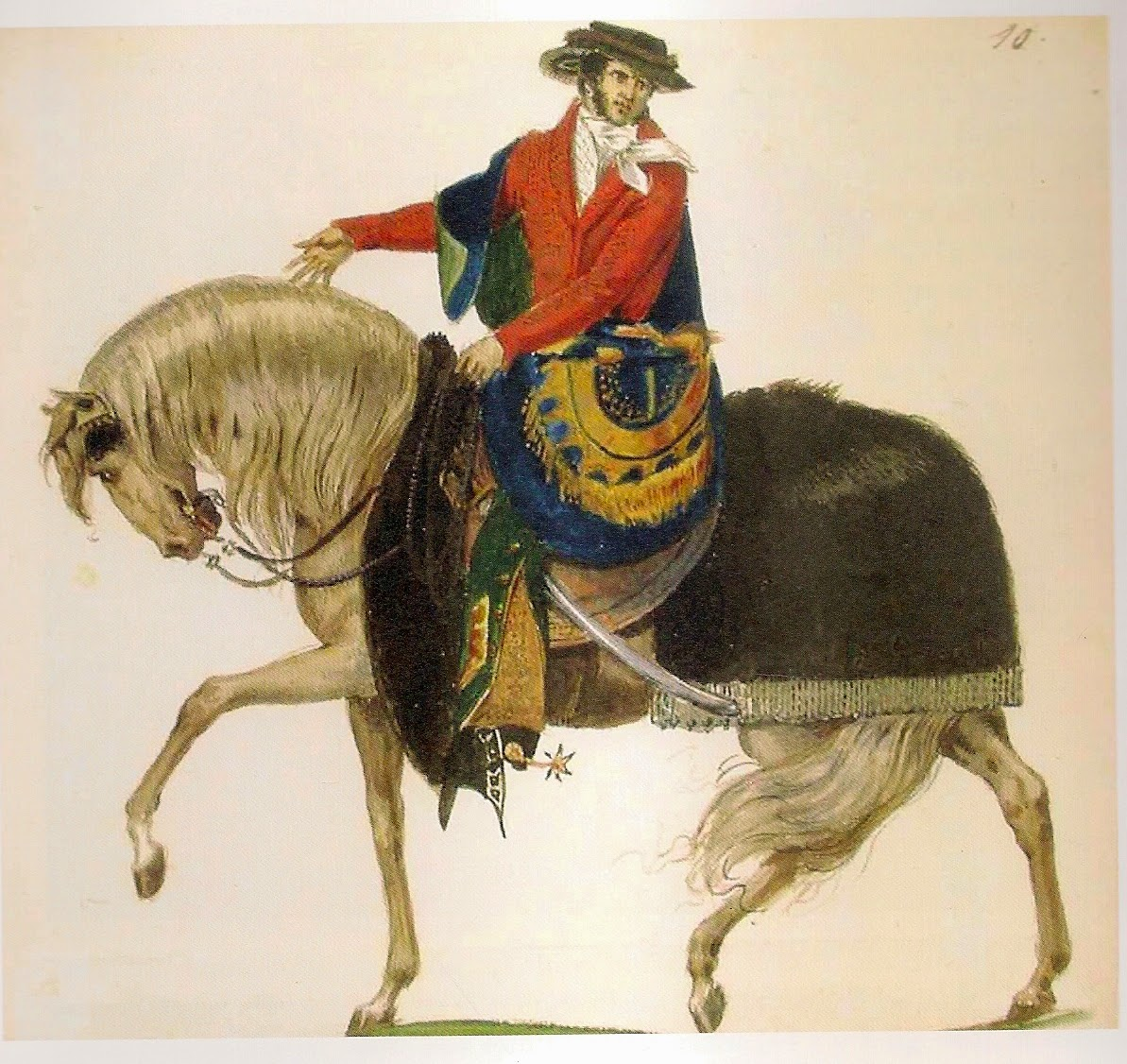
Mexican nobleman with luxury Charro outfit, wearing a low crown Jarano, with a moderately broad, slouching brim and thick hatband (1824)

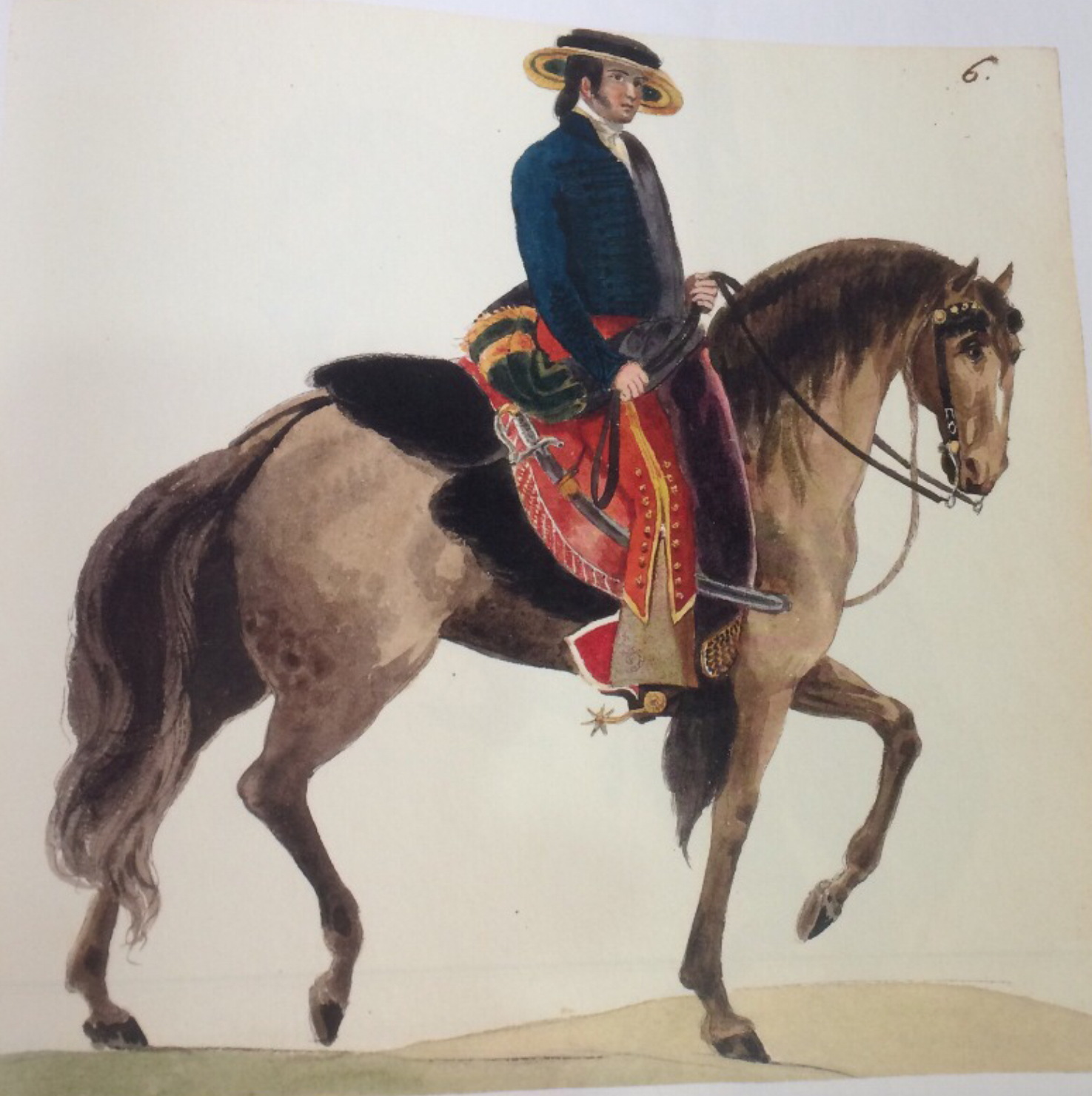
Same type of jarano hat with a very, thick black hatband (1825)

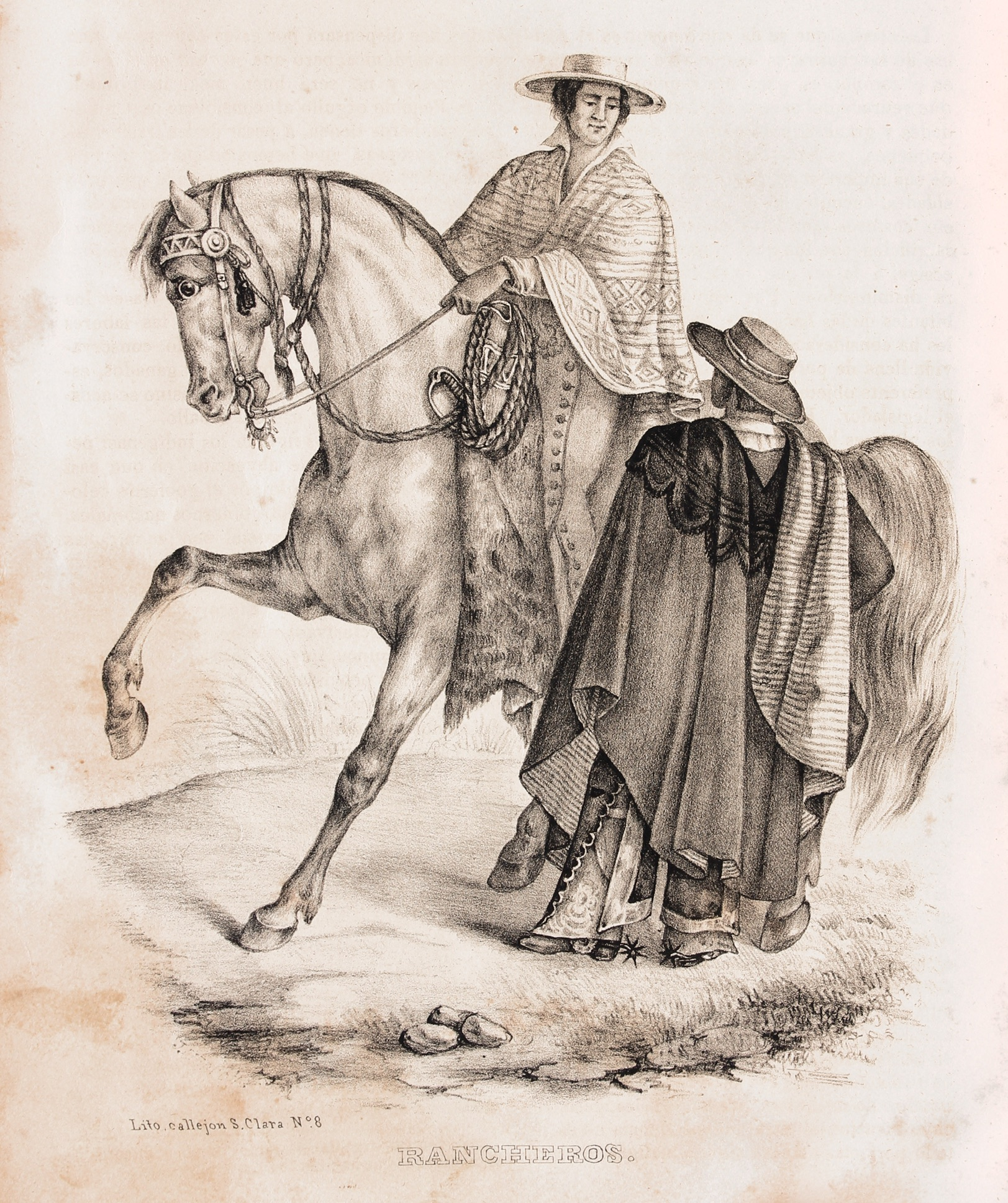
«Rancheros» wearing a low crown, slightly broad, slouched brimmed jarano (1844)

An early description of the charro costume by a foreigner, was written by the British explorer and writer Edward B. Penny. In 1824, he provided a detailed description of the charro attire in Mexico City, noting that the hat was "low-crowned", with a wide brim, similar, he said, to the hats worn by Quakers:

The equipment of a charro, the name given to an amateur of the national dress of both himself and his horse, is very curious, and well worth making a drawing of. [...] The sombrero is a low hat, with a wide brim, in the style of the Quakers, made of wool, dyed brown, green, black, or grey; the shade is lined with gold lace; the band is a thick cord of gold, terminating in a gold tassel, which plays upon the brim.

Between the 1820s and 1830s, another style of charro hat emerged, larger in size, with a medium-height, flat crown, a wider, moderately flexible brim, and a very thin ribbon-like band, ending in tassels that draped over the brim. This style of hat fell out of use around the 1850s.

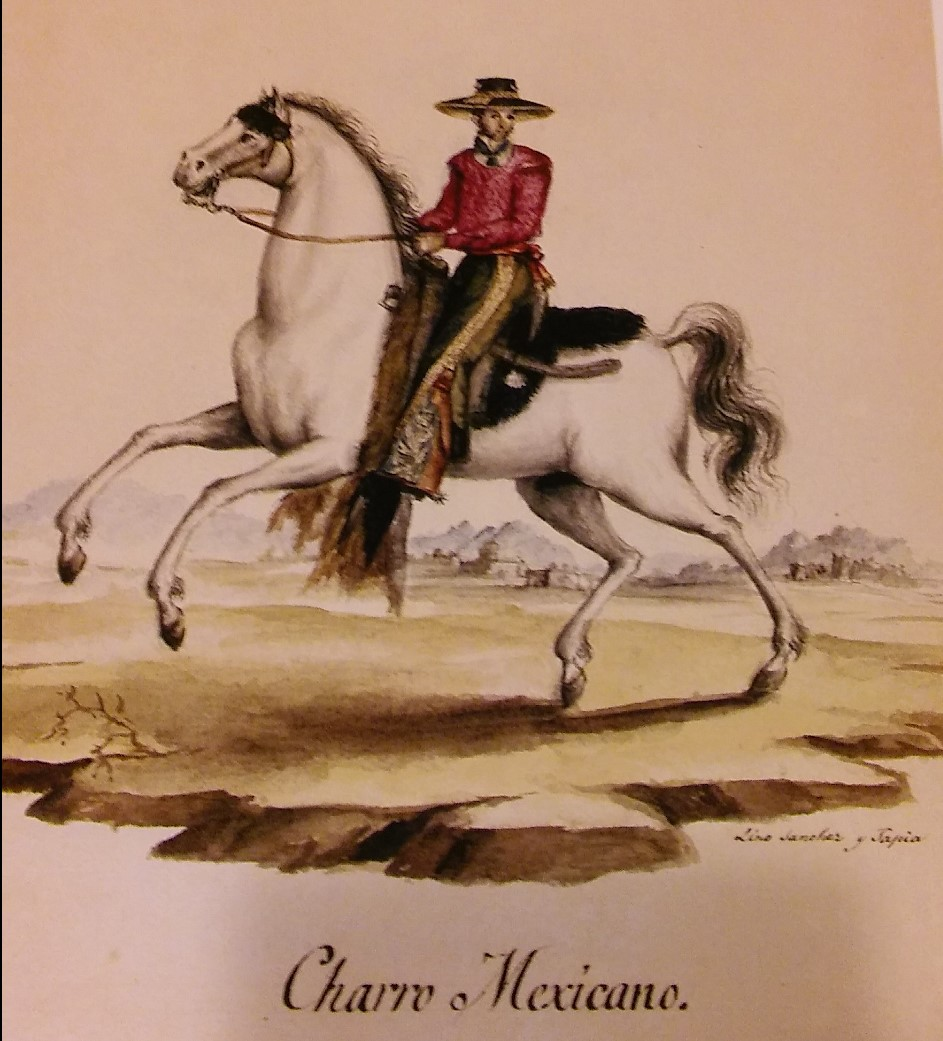
The charro wears a black, broad-brimmed jarano with a golden hatband with tassels that lay upon the brim (1828).

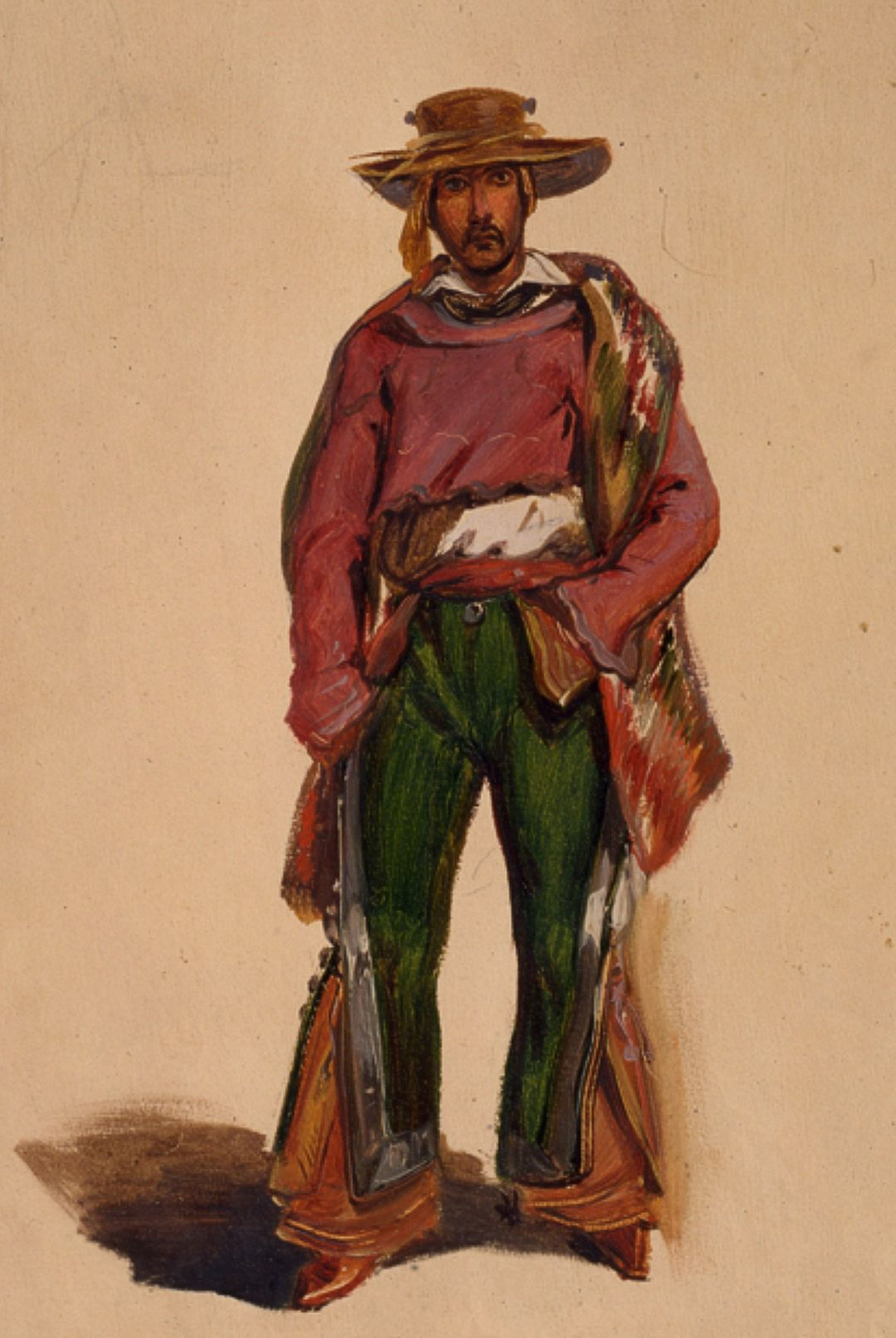
Same style, but brown, with golden hatband (1830)

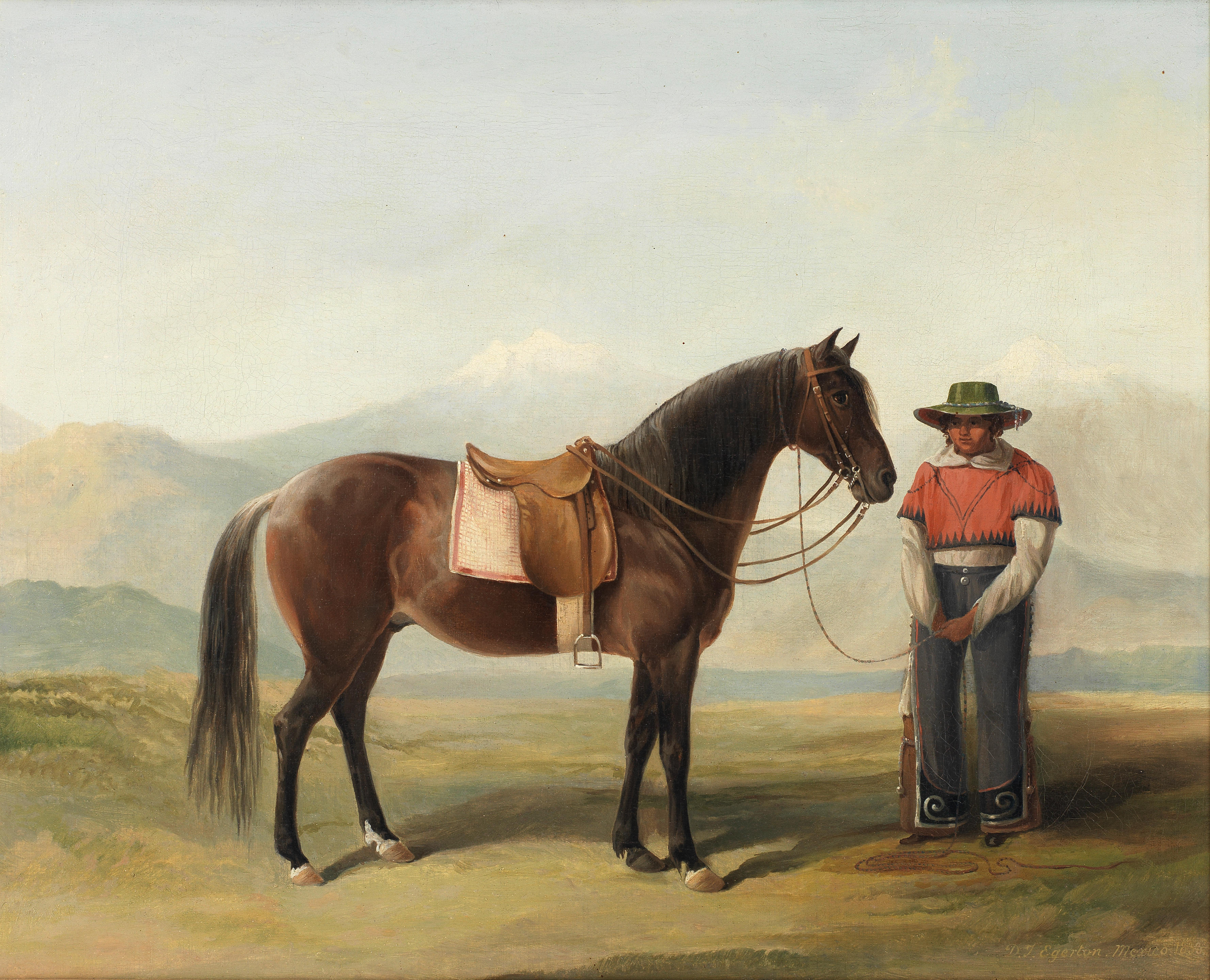
Here, the hatband extends over the brim and the tassels hang from it (1833).

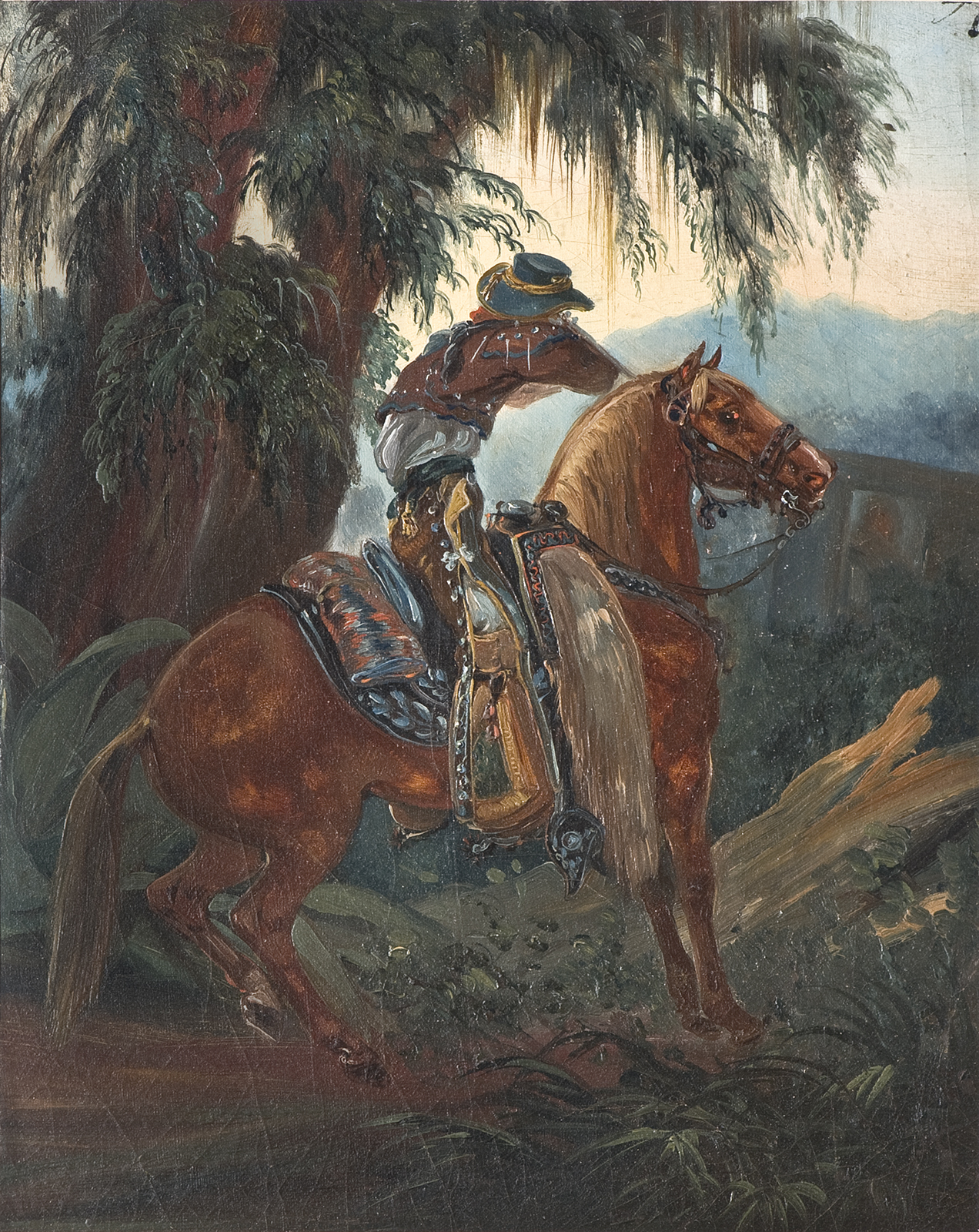
Same type of Jarano with a golden hatband with tassels (1832)

Around the mid-1840s, a new style of Jarano hat became fashionable; this style had a rigid, rather than flexible, brim, a medium-sized, flat crown, and a medium-width band resembling a sausage or snake coiled around it.

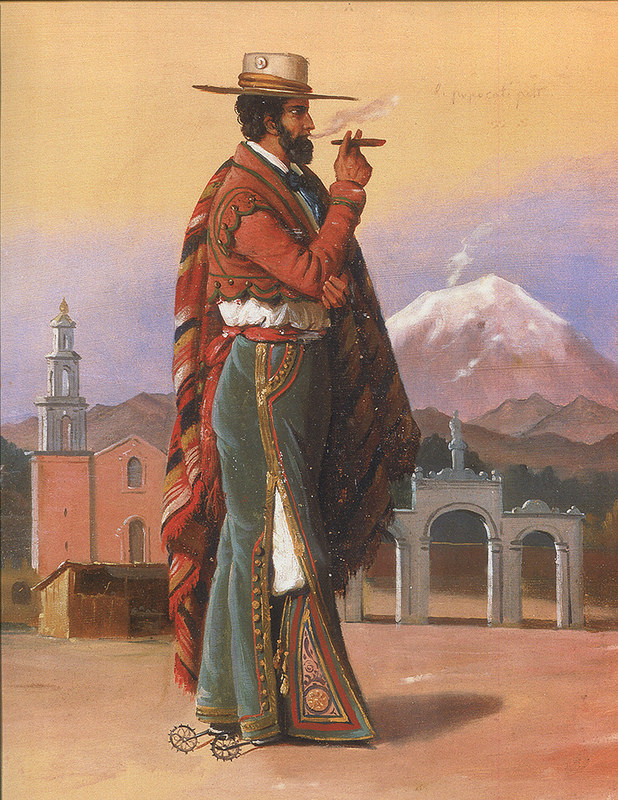

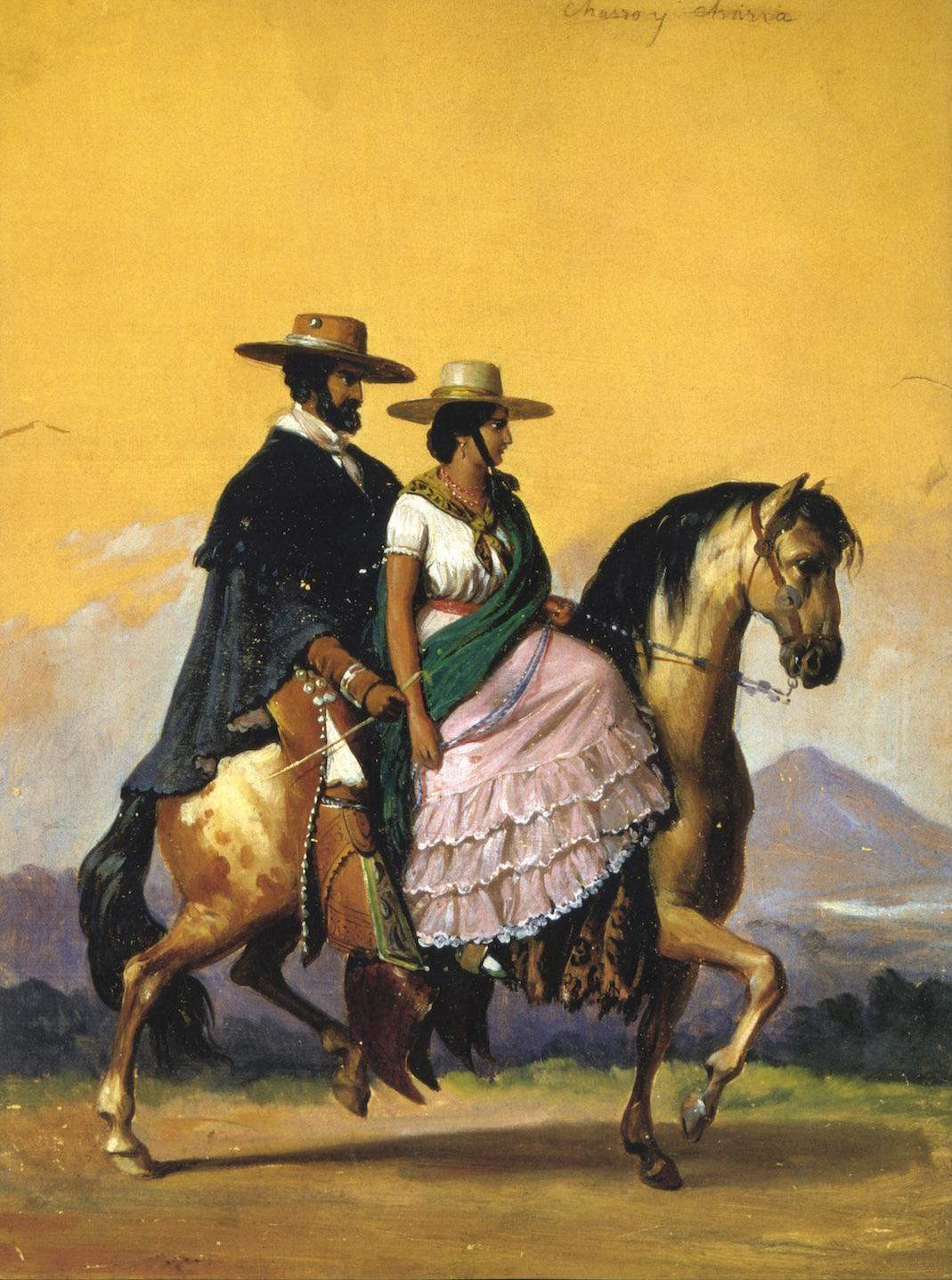

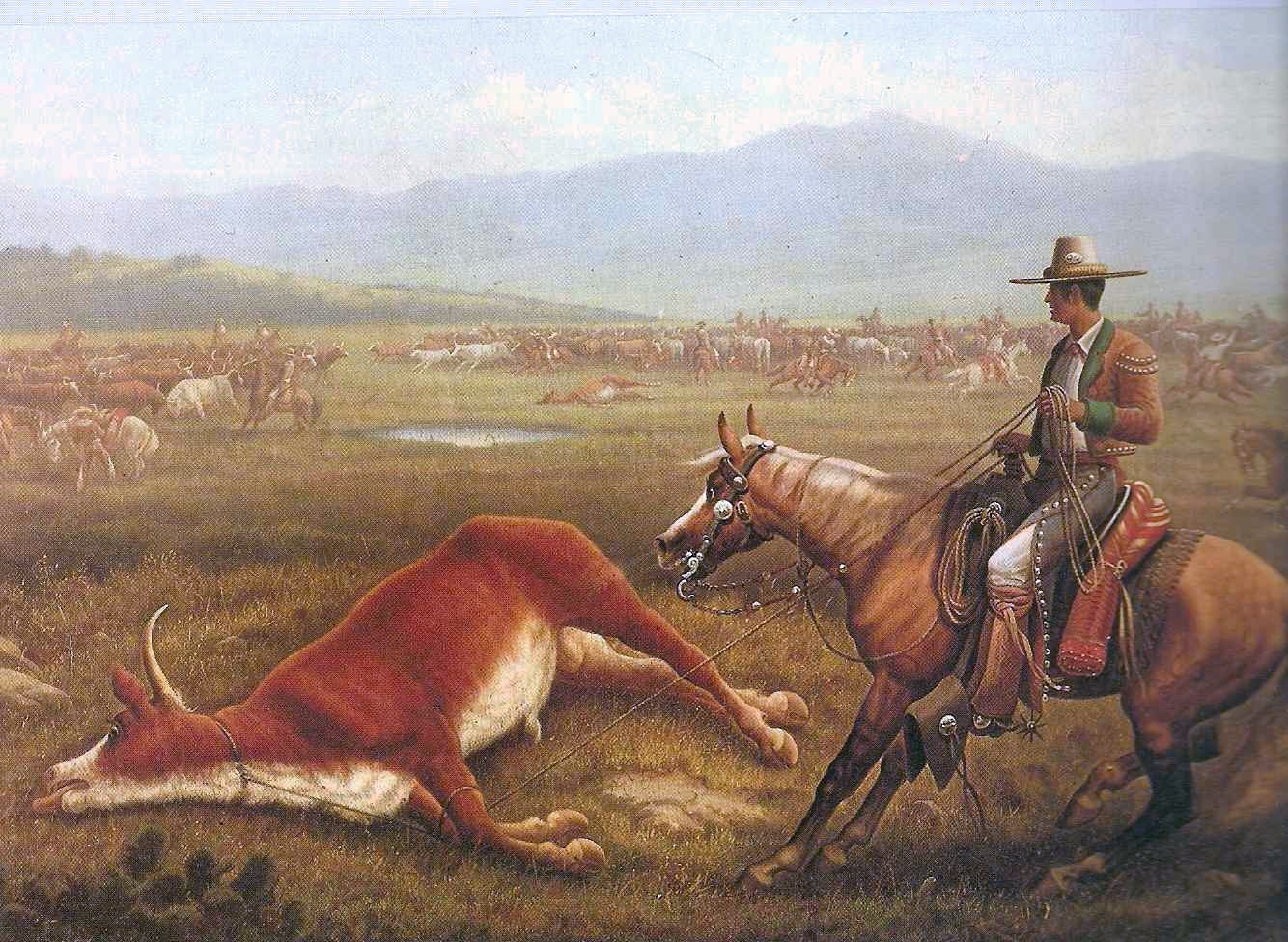

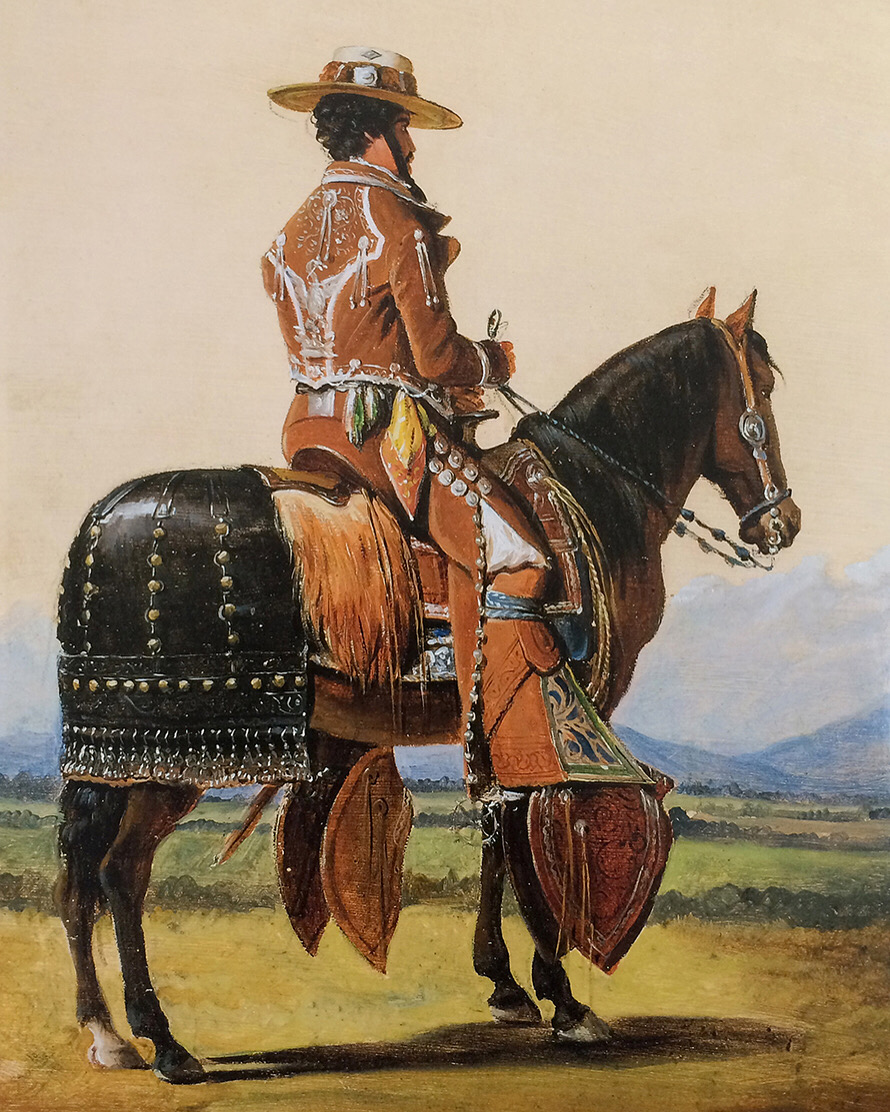

=== Gradual evolution (1860 to early 20th century) ===
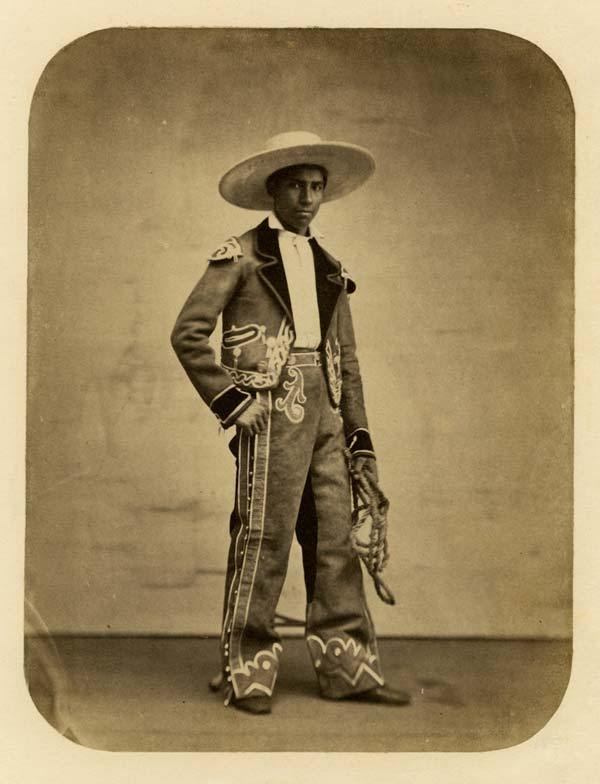
Towards the early 1860s, the jarano-poblano is small, wide brimmed with a low round crown.

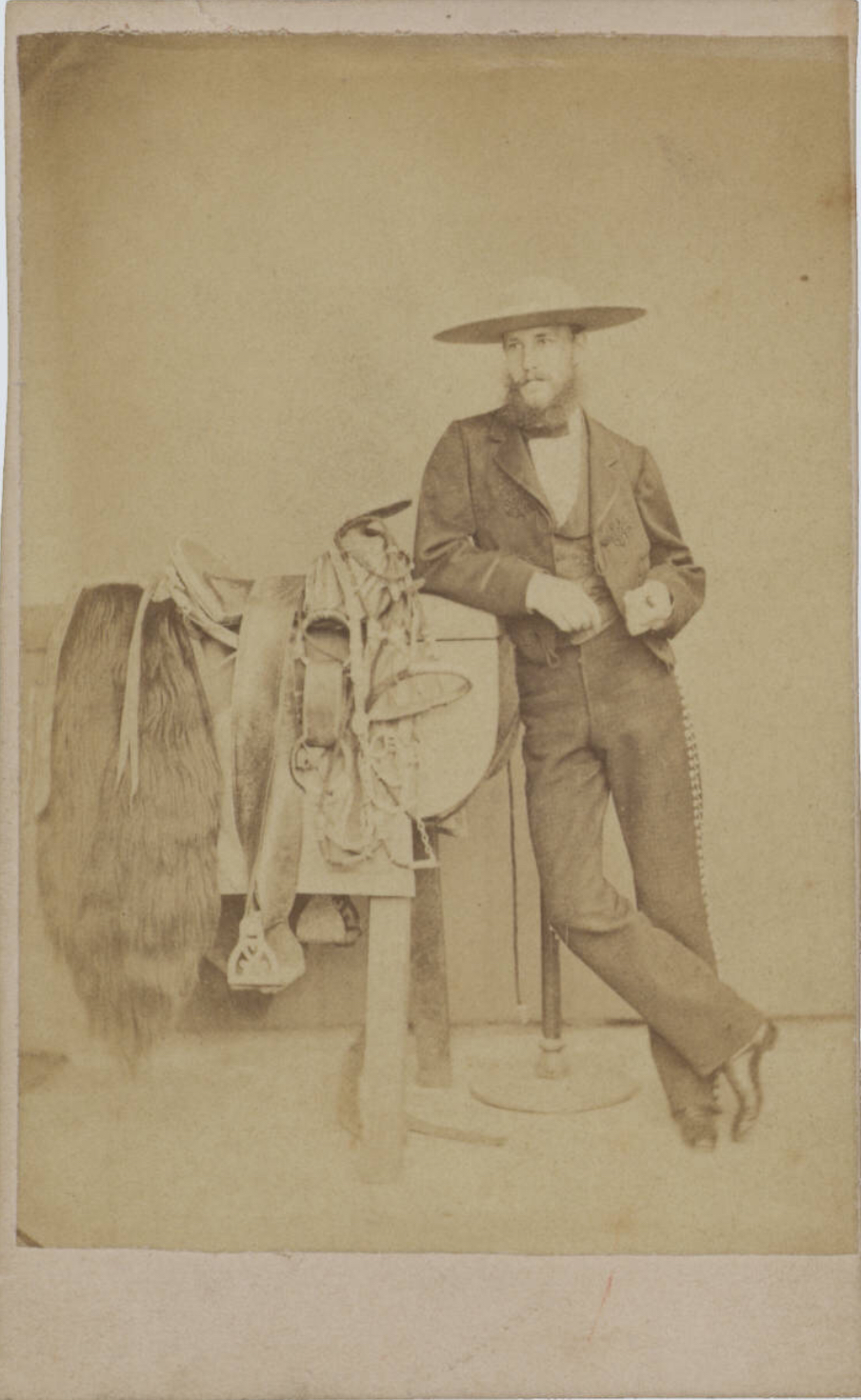
Another variant with rigid brim and a low round crown (1865)

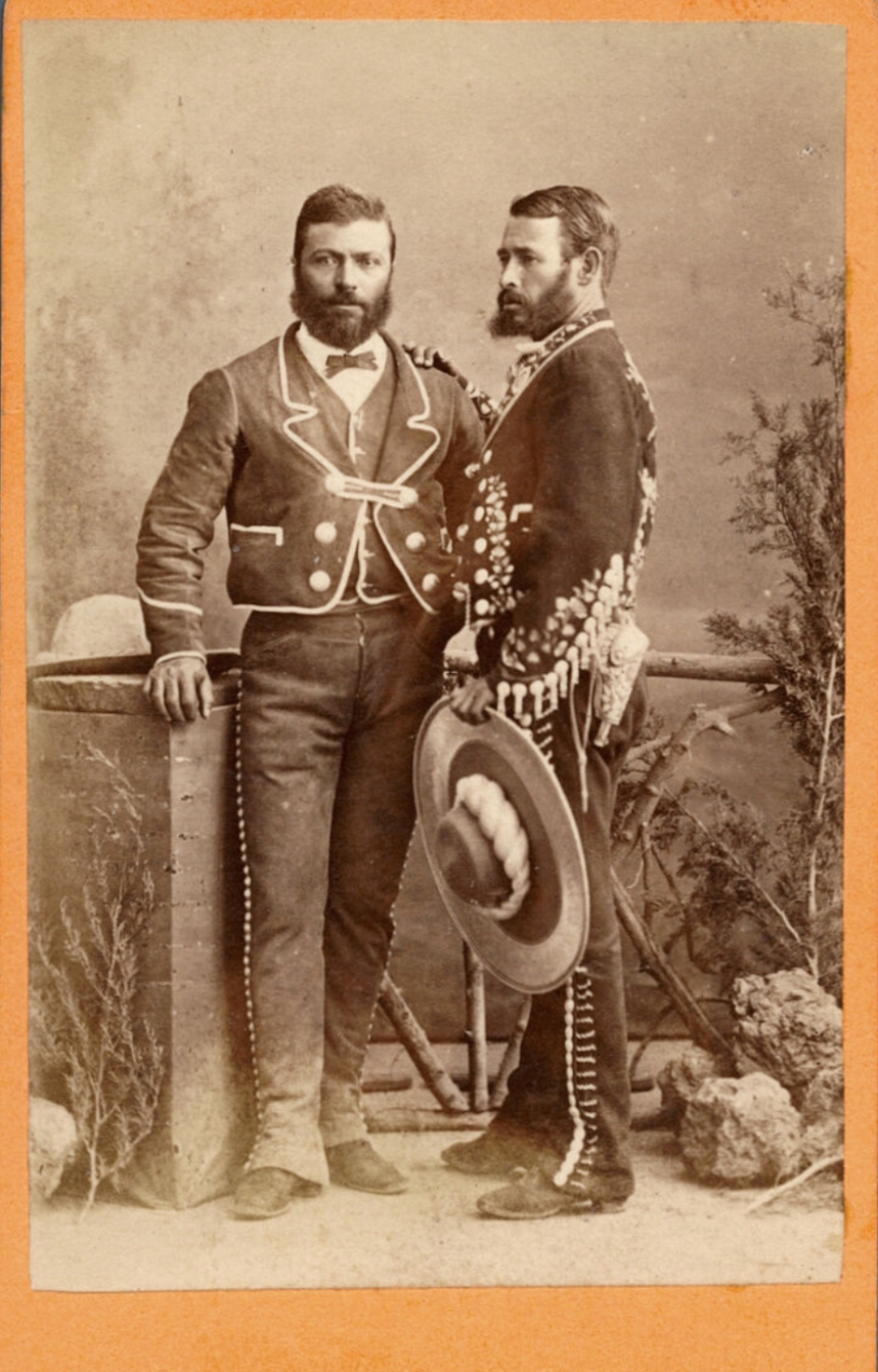
Large, broad-brimmed jarano, with the large, braided hatband around the low, round crown (ca. 1868)

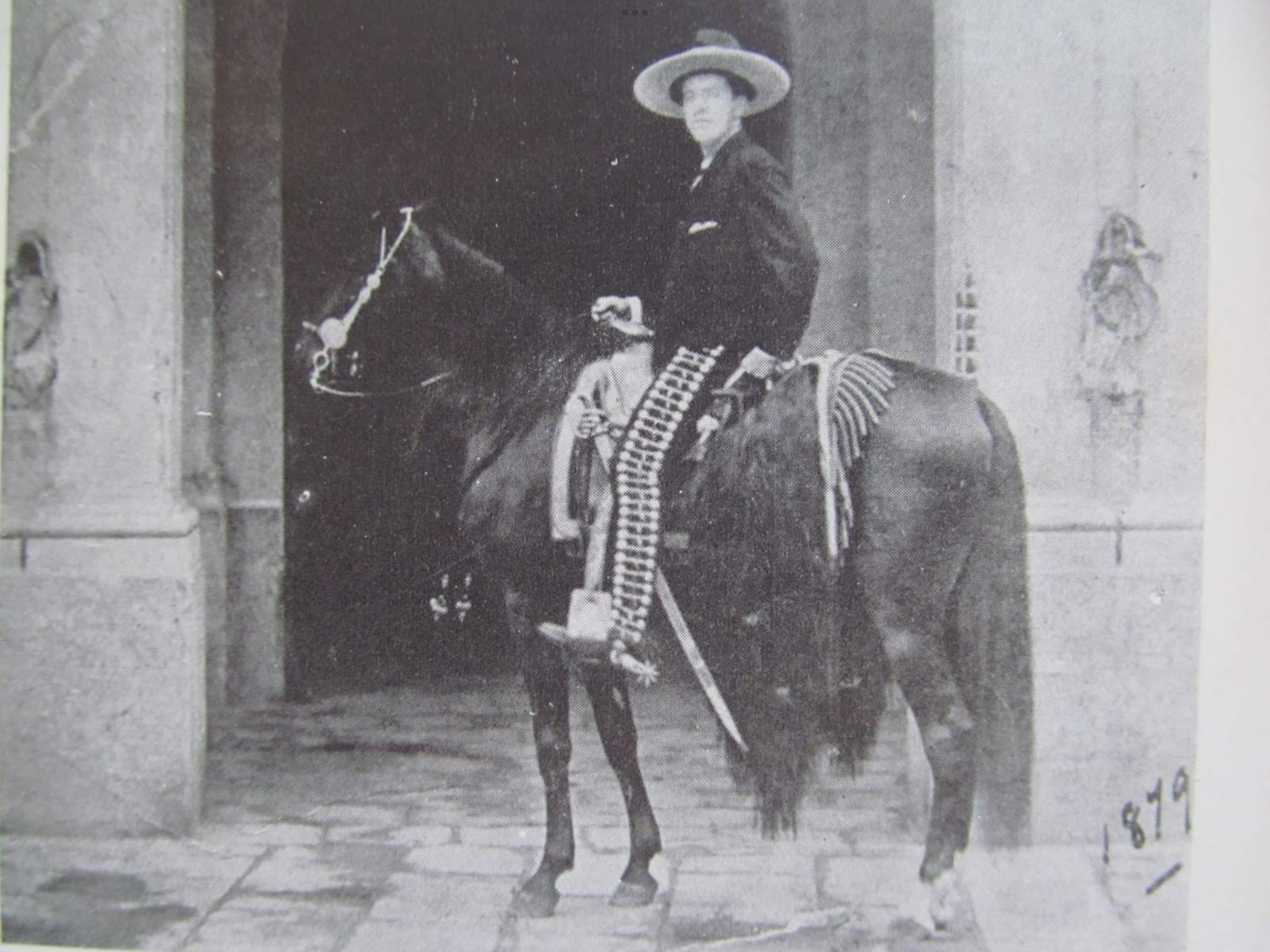
By 1879, the crown becomes more prominent as it's no longer low, but it's still round.

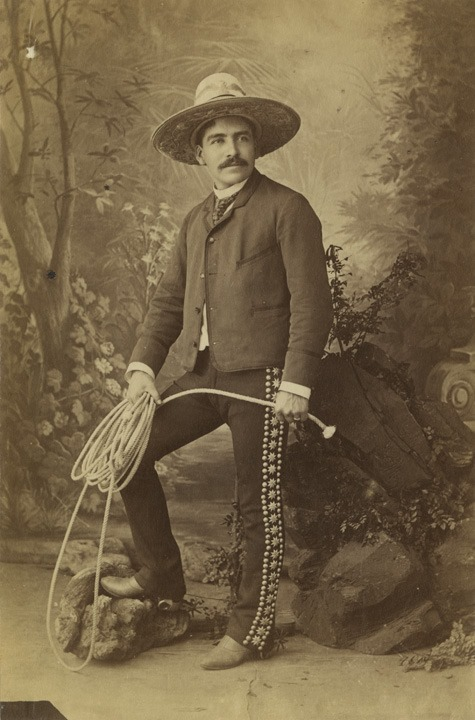
By 1889, the crown was even more prominent, but it still lacks the conical, pointed shape.

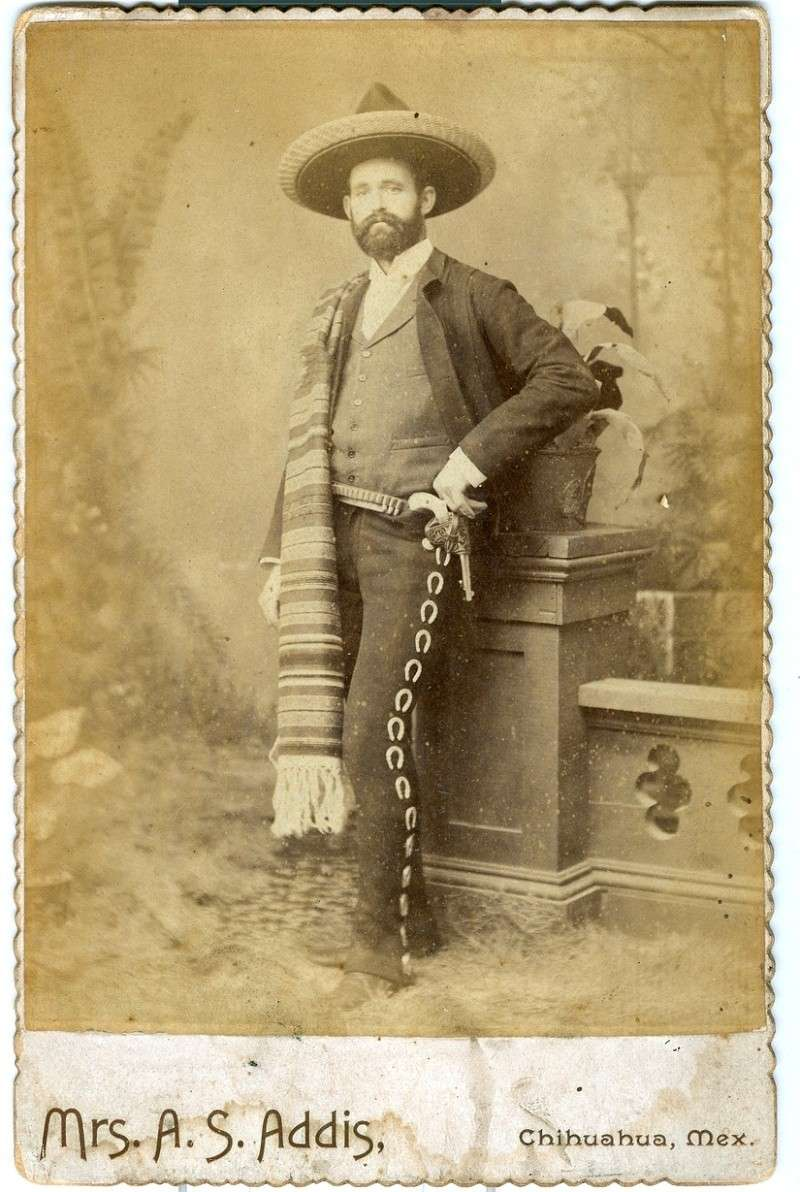
Towards 1890, the crown becomes conical and pointed in shape.

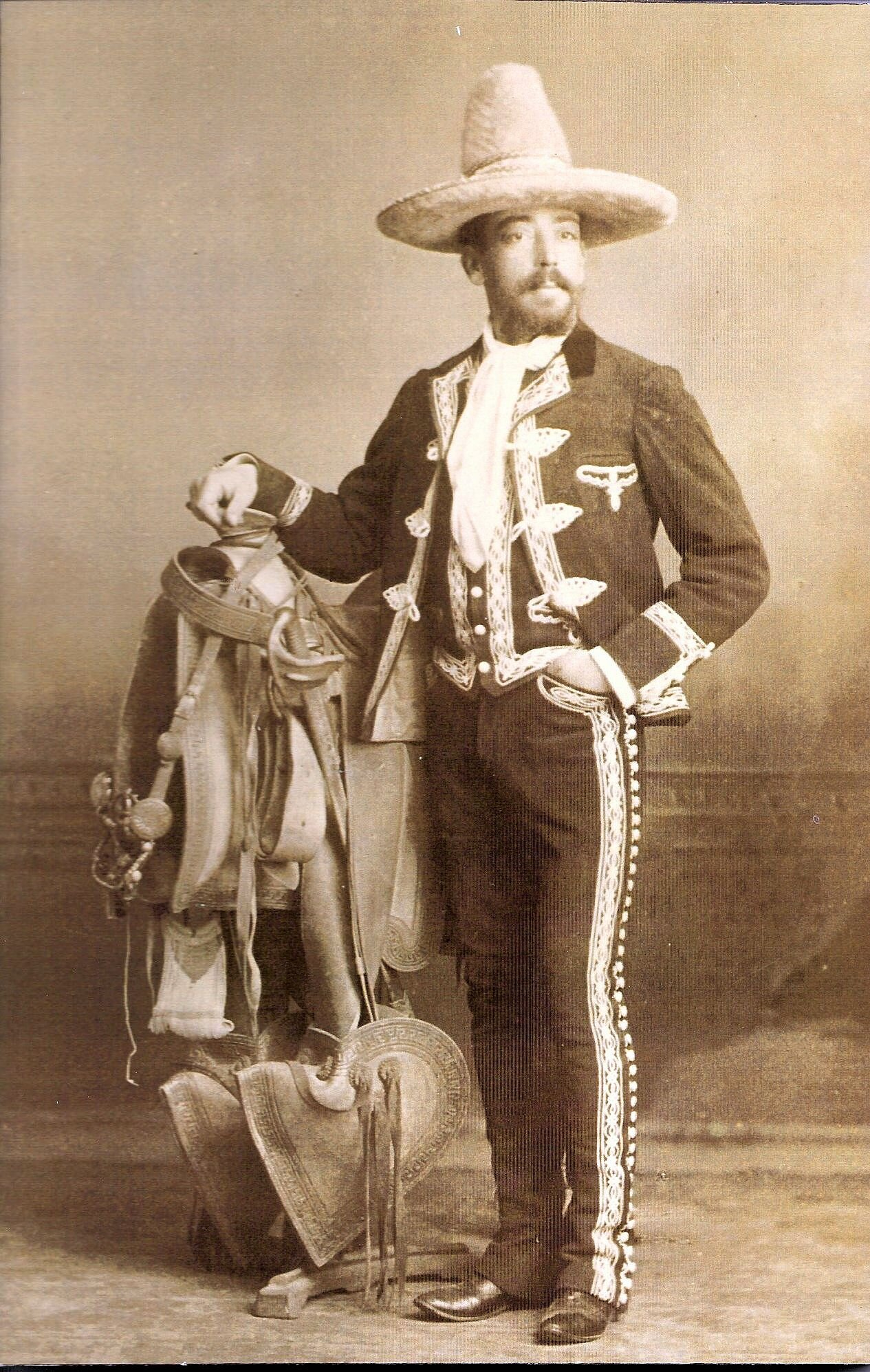
By 1900, the tall, conical and very pointed crown has become common and standard.

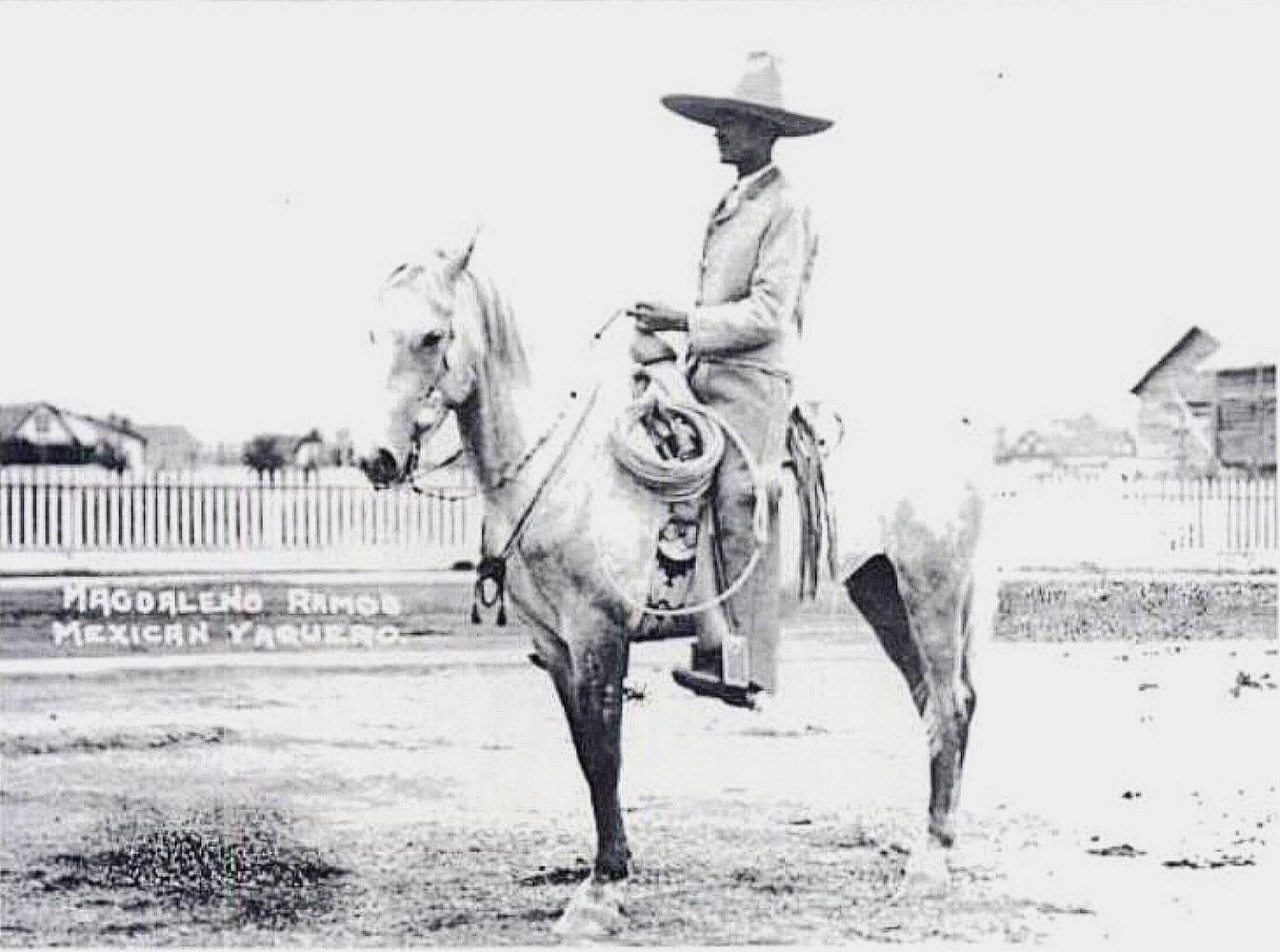
The final stage, which would be the base for the current models (ca. 1912).

Several hypotheses have been proposed to explain this evolution of the charro hat, and ultimately the adoption of the tall crown or "piloncillo" style. The charro historian, José Ramón Ballesteros, argued that the change in the crown was made to increase air circulation, and the brim was enlarged for greater protection from the sun. Don Carlos Rincón Gallardo, an avid horseman, claimed that his uncle, Don Pedro Romero de Terreros y Gómez de Parada, was the first to wear the tall-crowned hat, describing him as "not a great charro", but as an "extravagant" individual. A study published in the American Journal of American Folklore in 1896 suggested that the tall-conical crowned sombrero was a Spanish-colonial modification of the straw hats worn by the Tlaxcaltec, Tarascan, and Otomi peoples.

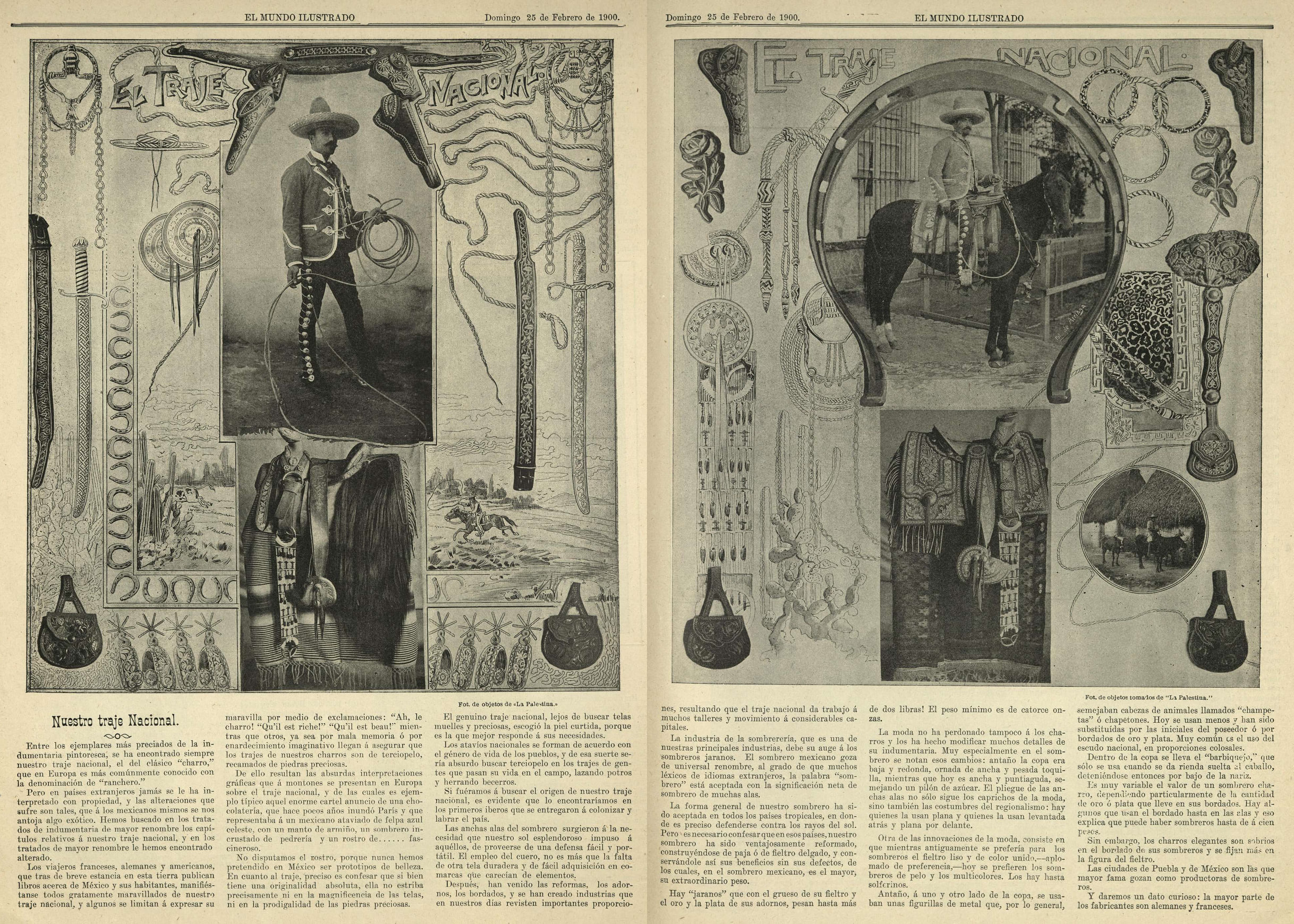
El Traje Nacional article about the Mexican Charro outfit in the journal El Mundo Ilustrado (1900)

A short article published in 1900 in the newspaper El Mundo Ilustrado about the national costume and its evolution states that fashion influenced the charro outfit, particularly the hat, which, from a low crown style, evolved by 1900 to the high, "sugarloaf" shape:

Fashion hasn't spared the charro outfit either, and has led to changes in many details of their traditional attire. These changes are particularly noticeable in the hat: in the past, the crown was low and round, adorned with a wide, heavy band, whereas today it is wide and pointed, resembling a sugarloaf. The way the wide brim is folded not only follows the whims of fashion, but also regional customs: some wear it flat, while others have it raised at the back and flat in the front. Another fashion innovation is that, whereas previously smooth, solid-color felt hats—preferably gray—were preferred, today they favor felt hats with a textured surface and multicolored designs, even some in a bright purplish-red color.

These extremes, which continued throughout the first two decades of the 20th century, were not always to the liking of many charros. When the very tall, pointed-crown hats with large, stiffened brims, and long chin straps ending in tassels became common, they were considered not stylish – the chin straps were even considered "anti-charro" because they interfered with winding the lasso (reata) to the saddle-horn; and during the gallop or run, they could slap against the face, causing discomfort.

== Cultural influence ==
In the Philippines, due to the influence from Spain brought about by the Manila galleon trade, the term has been assimilated into the Tagalog language in the form of sumbrero and now refers to any hat – from Mexican sombreros (as used in the English language) to baseball caps.

The galaxy Messier 104 is known as the Sombrero Galaxy due to its appearance. Similarly, Tampa Stadium was also known as "The Big Sombrero". In mathematics, the Jinc function is sometimes called the sombrero function; and in physics, the Sombrero potential is a prescription for the potential energy that leads to the Higgs mechanism.

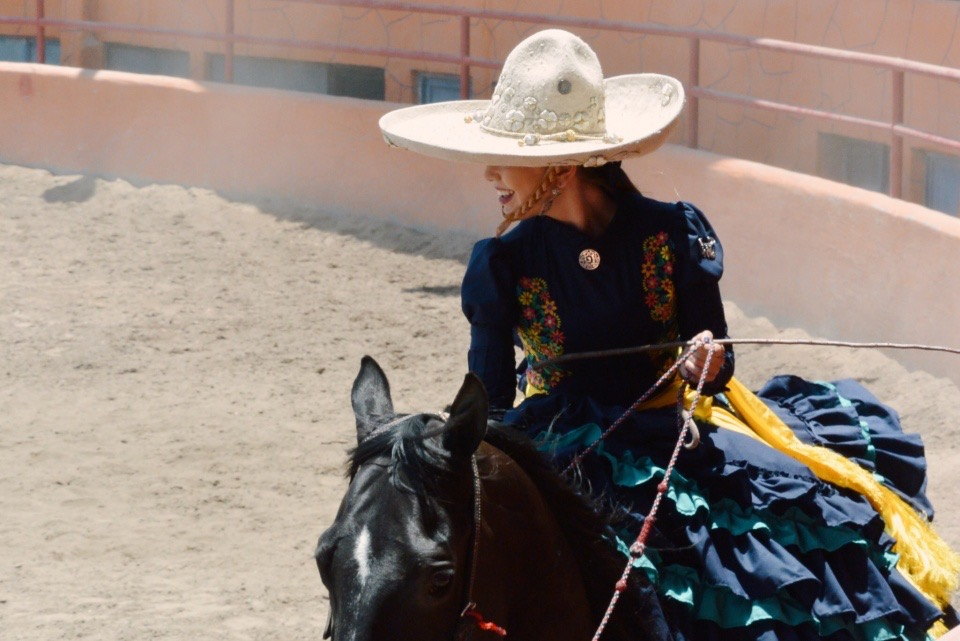
A Mexican Escaramuza charra wearing a sombrero in a charreada

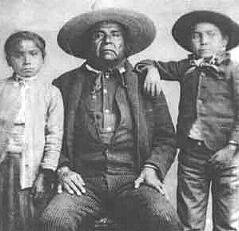
An Apache chief with a sombrero

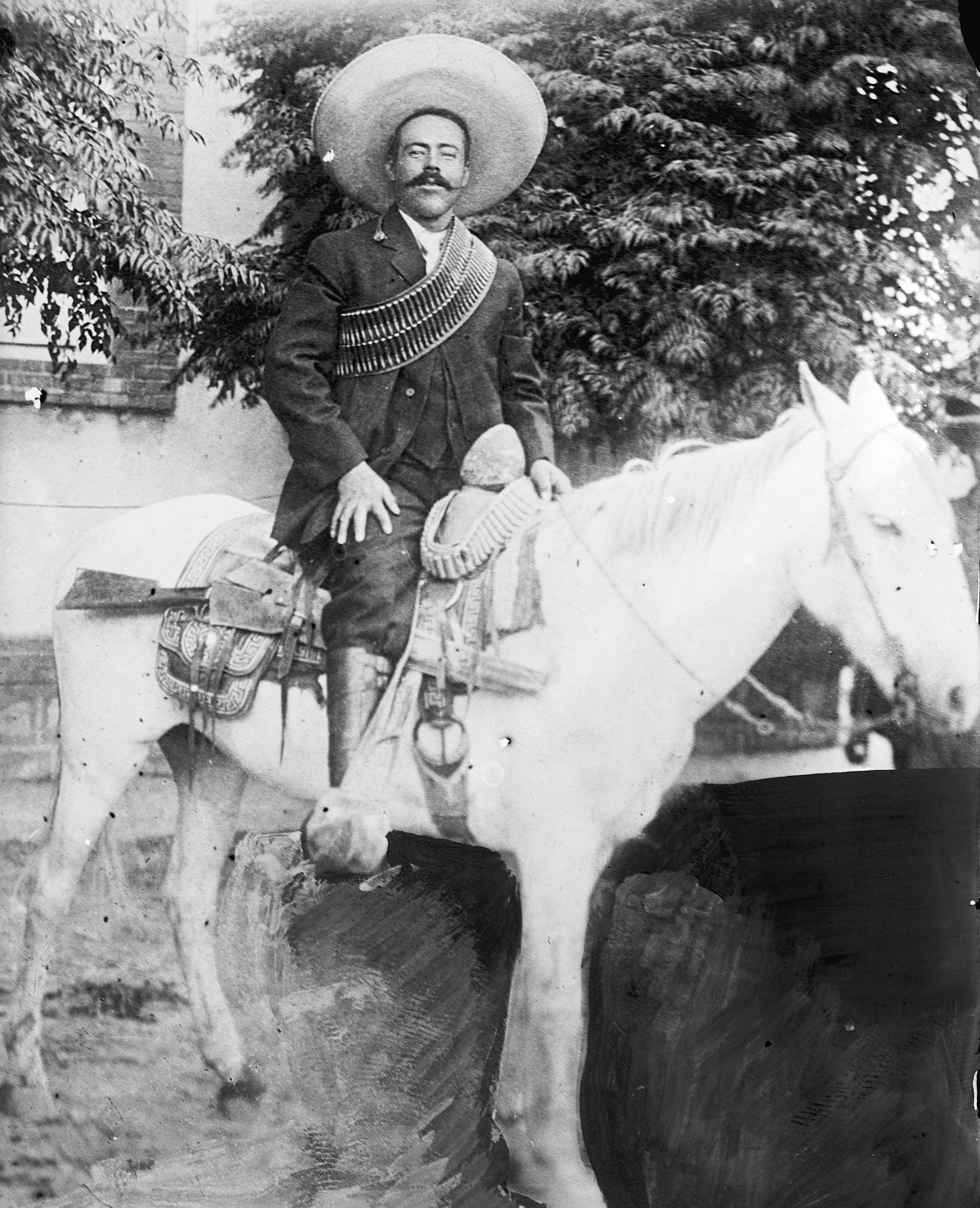
Pancho Villa wearing a sombrero

== See also ==
- Jarabe Tapatío, often referred to as the Mexican hat dance
- Ranch
- Vaquero
- Western wear

Other kinds of hats:

- List of hat styles
- List of headgear
- Boss of the plains
- Cap
- Chupalla
- Sun hat
