= Charro outfit =

Mexican style of dress

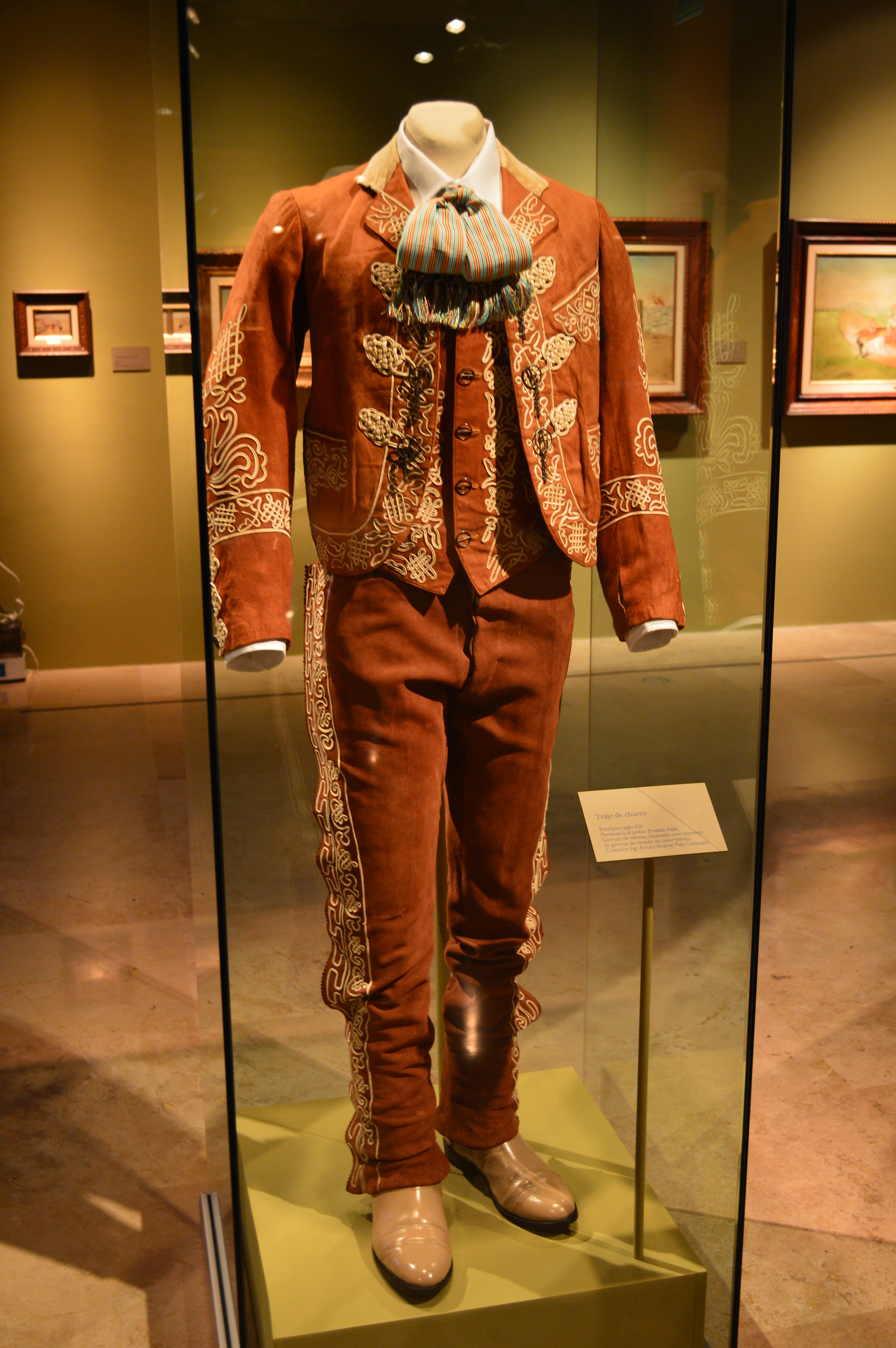
Charro suit from early 20th century.

A charro or charra outfit or suit (traje de charro, in Spanish) is a style of dress originating in Mexico and based on the clothing of a type of horseman, the charro. The style of clothing is often associated with charreada participants, mariachi music performers, Mexican history, and celebration in festivals. The charro outfit is one that is associated with Mexico around the world. It is seen as a national emblem and a way to express personal pride in Mexican heritage. Charro outfits can be worn by men or women and have various levels of formality from work-wear to very expensive formal attire. The outfits consist of tight, decorated pants or a long skirt, short jackets, silk ties and are often worn with a wide-brimmed sombrero and other accessories as appropriate.

== About ==
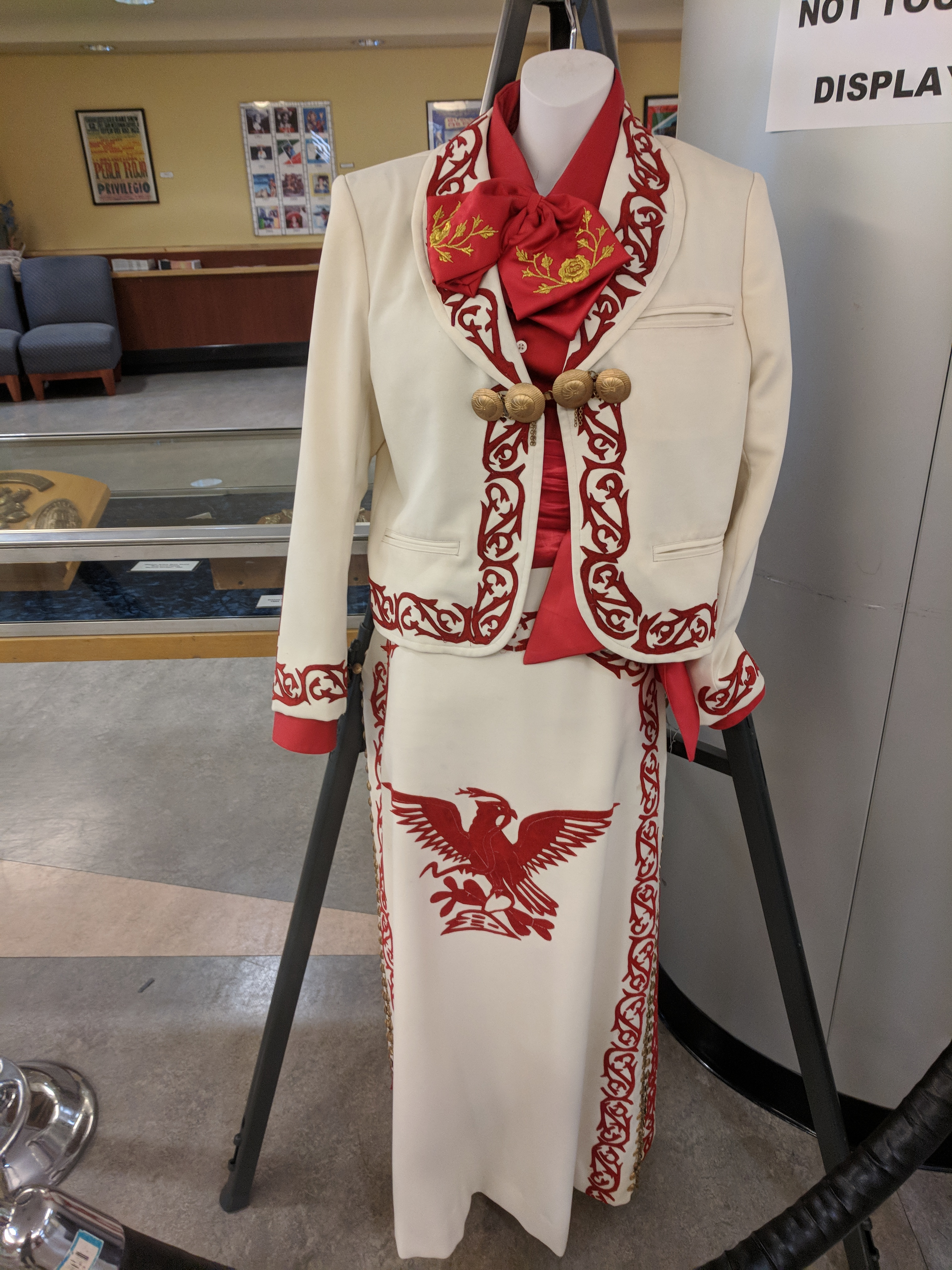
Charra outfit designed by Malena Cano.

A basic charro outfit worn by men consists of long, tight pants covered with decoration on the sides. The coat worn by both men and women is short and embroidered. These coats are also known as bolero jackets or chaquetillas. Embroidery often depicts plant life, Aztec motifs or other themes. Traditionally, the embroidery was made of metallic thread or of pitea fiber. Charro outfits also consist of a wide-brimmed hat (sombrero) and silk tie. The charra outfit for women is similar, with women wearing a long, embroidered skirt, reaching the ankles, instead of the pants. The skirt is typically full enough to allow the woman to ride sidesaddle. Other aspects of the outfit may include a dress shirt, chaps, serape and pitea belt. The outfits are often colorful. The footwear is either a high-heeled boot, or a leather shoe.

Different versions of the charro outfit are ranked based on a 1960 decision of the National Charro Federation. The least formal is known as the faena or work outfit. The next levels are media gala, gala, gran gala and etiqueta or formal. Mariachi performers wear a version of a charro outfit called the "gala version" and is most often black with silver, though modern mariachis wear more colorful outfits. The faena outfit is unadorned and typical of working charros.

An expensive charro outfit was reported in a 1942 edition of the Arizona Republic that was decorated in silver and "evaluated at 10,000 pesos." In 1985, Victor Almaraz of California made a charro outfit consisting mainly of around 2,500 interlocking aluminum can pull tabs.

The charro outfit is seen as a representative symbol of Mexican culture. The outfit and other charro imagery is often incorporated in tourist advertisements and has become one of the "most universally recognized emblem of Mexican identity around the world." The charro suit can be worn to express pride for Mexican heritage.

== History ==
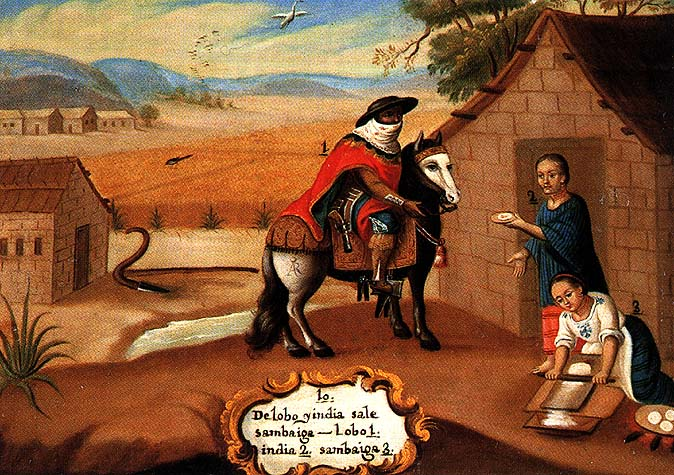
18th century charro outfit.

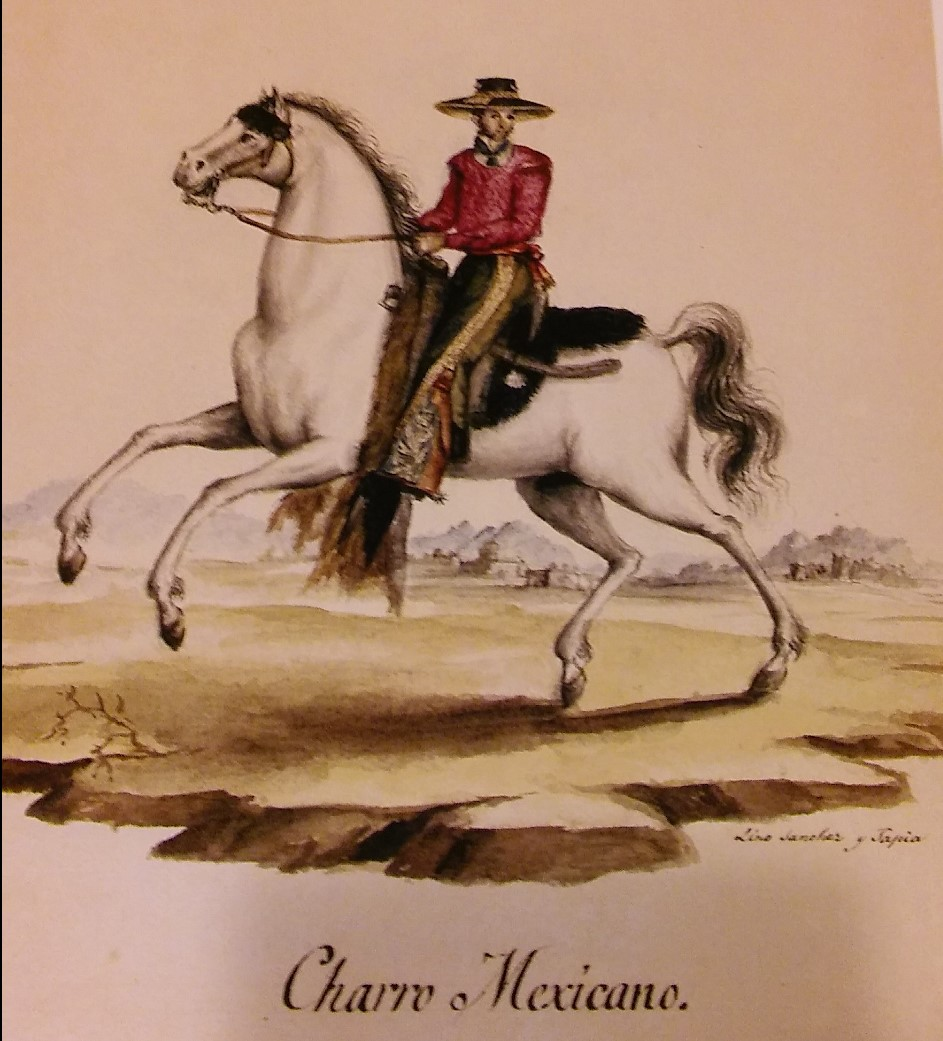
An 1828 charro with a distinct outfit from the 18th century.

Although its precise history is uncertain, it’s popularly believed that the charro outfit’s origin may be traced back to the Spanish province of Salamanca of the 16th century, solely based on the fact that the term “charro” is also used as a demonym for the people of that province. Because of this, people assumed that the Mexican charros must’ve originated in that province because they share the same name. It is therefore believed that Spanish conquistadors brought this type of clothing with them to Mexico, although there is no evidence of this and there is no evidence that show how vaqueros and horsemen dressed prior to the 18th century. Evidence does show that charro outfits were distinctly different and have been evolving since the 18th century.

When Spain colonized Mexico, the government initially made it illegal for indigenous Mexicans to ride horses without Spanish landowner permission. This was part of a system that created the casta or caste system in Mexico. When the Spanish allowed lower classes to ride, they were required to wear clothing that differentiated themselves from the Spanish, which led to a new fashion. The wide brim of the sombrero worn by charros protected them both from the sun and, due to the hard crown, from head injuries. The pants were worn tight to prevent snagging on brush, or chaparral and the coat worn short to provide better access to weaponry. Charros were considered part of the lower class in 17th century Mexico. The word charro was a derogatory term, originally meant to indicate their class status.

When President Benito Juárez created the first national police force of Mexico, Los Rurales (the Rural Police) in 1861 their official uniform was based on the charro outfits of the infamous Platenados (silver) bandit gangs. In fact, many bandits enlisted in this new police force, primarily because President Juárez and his Constitutional government, whose funds were limited, had to enlist bandit gangs to fight, first in the Civil War of Reform (1857-1860) and then against the ensuing French Intervention (1861-1867). The charro uniform was all about maintaining a special macho image. The wearer of a charro outfit was supposed to be seen as an excellent horseman, marksman, and lover, although very few Rurales actually were all three, according to historians like Paul J. Vanderwood. For decades it was believed that General Porfirio Díaz, the "presidential dictator" of Mexico for thirty-five years (1876-1911) created the Rurales until the truth about Juárez's role was discovered in the national archives. Therefore, one can argue that the charro uniform was important in Mexican culture prior to the Mexican Revolution (1911-1920). The Rurales were disbanded in 1914 by President Venustiano Carranza, during the Mexican Revolution.

After the Mexican Revolution, the imagery of the charro became important to Mexican culture. Mexican president, Porfirio Díaz, influenced mariachi performers to adopt the charro costume in the early 1900s. Mariachi musicians would accompany ranchera singers starting in the 1930s and in the 1940s ranchera musicians adopted the charro suit.

Since 1934, September 14 is the national holiday known as the Día Nacional del Charro (National Day of the Charro) and is celebrated throughout Mexico to recognize the importance of horsemen and women to the culture of the country. Festivities include parades and shows of horsemanship, with riders in the iconic traditional costume. The outfit was further popularized by actors who wore the charro suit in movies made during the Golden Age of Mexican Cinema.

In 2002, police officers in Mexico City began to wear charro outfits on patrol in the city's historic districts. The officers were meant to both "entertain and protect the tourists that flood the Central Alameda area."

During the 2011 Pan American Games Parade of Nations, charro outfits were the uniform for the Games' Mexican home team. Theirs had white bolero jackets, green, white, and red striped ties, white sombreros, brown belts, and black pants (men) or skirts (women).

== In popular culture ==
Charro outfits were worn in the Golden Age of Mexican Cinema by actors such as Jorge Negrete, Pedro Infante, Emilio Fernández, Pedro Armendáriz and Luis Aguilar. The character, Gordo, in the eponymous comic strip by Gustavo Arriola, was portrayed dressed in charro outfits. The children's story, La Fiesta y el Mariachi by Marta Arroyo, describes traditional Mexican clothing, including the charro outfit. An annual celebration known as Charro Days in Brownsville, Texas incorporates the charro outfit among many participants and attendees.

== See also ==
- Charreada
- Charro Days
- Mariachi
- Ranchera
- Michoacán
- Jalisco
