= Rurales (disambiguation) =

Rurales or Guardia Rural (Rural Guard) was a Mexican rural mounted police force (1861–1911).

Rurales may also refer to:

- Cuerpo de Defensa Rural (Rural Defense Corps), a Mexican part-time militia (1926–present)
- Guardia de Asistencia Rural (Rural Assistance Guard), a former Costa Rican rural police force; see Costa Rican Civil Guard
- Unidad Móvil Policial para Áreas Rurales or UMOPAR (Mobile Police Unit for Rural Areas), a Bolivian rural police force
- Cuba also maintained the Cuban Rural Guard (Spanish: Guardia Rural Cubana) from 1898 until the revolution of 1959. A militarized and mounted constabulary, it performed the same rural policing functions as its Mexican and Spanish counterparts.

== See also ==
- Ruralista (disambiguation)
