= José Manuel Mireles Valverde =

Mexican medical doctor (1958–2020)

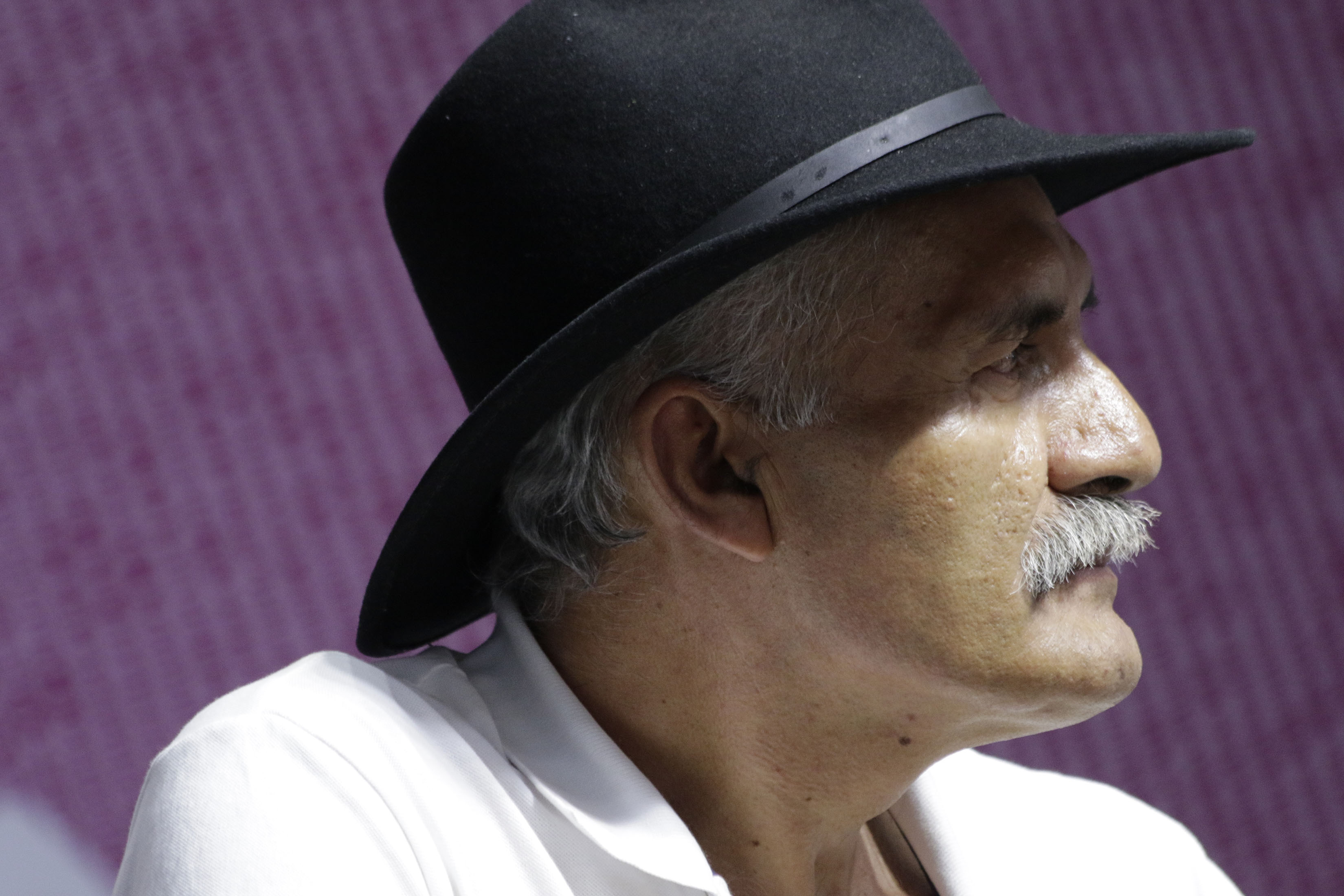
- Born: 24 October 1958; Michoacán, Mexico
- Died: 24 November 2020 (aged 62)
- Other name: Doctor Mireles
- Occupations: Medical surgeon Former Autodefensa leader
- Spouse: Ana Valencia Chavez (divorced)
- Allegiance: Paramilitary self-defense groups
- Convictions: Violating Mexico's federal law of firearms and explosives
- Criminal charges: Detained for violating Mexico's federal law of firearms and explosives

José Manuel Mireles Valverde (24 October 1958 – 25 November 2020) was a Mexican medical doctor, leader and founder of the paramilitary self-defense groups that fought against the Knights Templar Cartel, and other cartels, during the on-going cartel wars in the state of Michoacán and others, in México. Amid the inability of the Mexican government to protect its citizens, Mireles emerged as an important figure within the self-defense militias during the fall of 2013 as self-defense groups were fighting against the Knights Templar Cartel in Apatzingán and other municipalities on the Michoacán coast. He described his motivation to participate in the armed self-defense groups as stemming from the abuse of the Knights Templar Cartel against himself and his family, himself having been kidnapped by the cartel and several of his family members murdered. This impelled him to take up arms in defense of his community of Tepalcatepec.

On 25 November 2020, a Mexican government agency confirmed that Mireles, then aged 62, had died from "the effects of COVID-19".

== Early life ==
Some media outlets state that in 1988, at the age of 20 years, he served time in prison for allegedly producing marijuana, which Mireles has denied stating his imprisonment was for practicing medicine in Michoacán without a yet active state license.

He traveled to the U.S. where he worked as a social activist. Upon his return, he started some political work and ran for the Mexican Senate in 2006.

== Involvement in Autodefensas ==
Mireles stated he joined the self-defense group to protect his family against the Knights Templar Cartel, after he was kidnapped by the cartel which demanded money to release him, and also had murdered several of his relatives.

On 4 January 2014, Mireles was injured in a plane crash as he was traveling to the community of Zicuiran.

Two weeks later the Mexican government initiated efforts to control the escalating violence in Michoacán by deploying the Army against both the cartels and the self-defense militias.

Initially, a video of a badly wounded Mireles was published in which he urged the self-defense groups to lay down their arms and cooperate with the Army. But subsequently he appeared in a different video in which he stated that the self-defense groups would lay down their arms, but not until the Army had taken steps to secure their safety by curbing the activities of the Knights Templar Cartel, including the capture and/or death of the cartel's top leaders: Servando Gómez Martínez (alias "La Tuta"); Nazario Moreno González (alias "El Chayo"); Enrique Plancarte Solís (alias "El Kike"); Dionicio Loya Plancarte (alias "Tío Nacho"), among others.

Mireles later stated in an interview with Carmen Aristegui that the first message was the result of government officials requesting him to read a message written by them, which they then edited to make it look as if he was making the statement of his own opinion. The Mexican Secretary of State Miguel Angel Osorio Chong denied that the government had any role in producing the initial message.

In March 2014 some members of the council of Autodefensas distanced themselves from Mireles, stating that he was no longer a member of the leadership nor the official spokesperson of the Autodefensas in Michoacan.

Mireles' earlier functions were taken over by his former bodyguard Estanislao Beltrán Torres, alias "Papá Pitufo".

Other Autodefensas maintained loyal to their former faction, by rejecting Beltrán's leadership, after they realized he was planning on joining the Government Rural forces.

== Arrest ==
On 27 June 2014, Mireles was arrested with 45 other people in Lázaro Cárdenas, Michoacán by Mexican authorities for violating Mexico's Federal Law of Firearms and Explosives. The government had pledged to arrest civilians who were armed and did not form part of the Fuerza Rural ("Rural Force") police.

This action happened one week after a TV interview that was cut short as a consequence of a phone call ordering the termination of the interview, in which Mireles was denouncing the involvement of Mexico's president in the Michoacán irregularities.

From prison, Mireles sent messages to the nation through his former lawyer Talia Vazquez (the current is Javier Livas) and through the Grillonautas YouTube channel. In a message released in 2015, he stated: "Not only Manuel Mireles is innocent, but all self-defense members that had to carry a weapon to defend their home, their family, their property, because there was no one to help them."

In 2016, Mireles issued an apology to the government and his family for the disrespect he has shown official institutions in the country. In a video statement posted on social media, he said, "I want to apologize, through this message, to the Mexican government and its official and unofficial institutions, and its nation-wide structures, for disrespecting them with words or actions, for offending them with my omissions and civil disobedience." Charges against him were dropped by the Attorney General; however, Mireles remained in jail.

=== Release ===
On 11 May 2017 after almost 3 years in prison, a federal judge granted Mireles parole after he paid a bond of 30,000 pesos and agreed not to leave the state of Michoacán or the country.

Mireles was acquitted in 2018.

== In the media ==
Mireles was featured in the 2015 American documentary film Cartel Land.

Asav, the main antagonist of the 2017 action adventure game Uncharted: The Lost Legacy was inspired by Mireles. Like him, Asav was also a doctor until he became the leader of a powerful military force.
