= Cartel Land =

2015 American documentary film

- Theatrical release poster
- Directed by: Matthew Heineman
- Produced by: Matthew Heineman; Tom Yellin
- Cinematography: Matthew Heineman; Matt Porwoll
- Edited by: Matthew Hamachek; Matthew Heineman; Bradley J. Ross; Pax Wassermann
- Music by: Jackson Greenberg; H. Scott Salinas
- Production companies: A&E IndieFilms; The Documentary Group; Our Time Projects
- Distributed by: The Orchard
- Release dates: January 23, 2015 (Sundance); July 3, 2015 (United States/Mexico)
- Running time: 100 minutes
- Country: United States
- Languages: English; Spanish
- Box office: $792,194

Cartel Land is a 2015 American documentary film directed by Matthew Heineman about the Mexican drug war, especially vigilante groups fighting Mexican drug cartels. The film focuses on Tim "Nailer" Foley, the leader of Arizona Border Recon, and Dr. José Mireles, a Michoacán-based physician who leads the Autodefensas. The film was nominated for the Academy Award for Best Documentary Feature in 2016.

== Synopsis ==
The film focuses on two vigilante groups who fight drug cartels from different sides of the United States–Mexico border.

In Mexico, the film focuses on José Manuel Mireles Valverde, known locally as "El Doctor". Mireles becomes fed up with the local Knights Templar Cartel. He gathers a group of citizens from the state of Michoacán and leads an uprising, driving the cartel out of the region.

In the US, the film follows an American veteran named Tim "Nailer" Foley, who is forming a small paramilitary group called the Arizona Border Recon. His goal is to stop the same Mexican cartel from conducting business in the US.

== Production ==
Heineman got the idea for the film after reading about Arizona Border Recon in an article by Damon Tabor in Rolling Stone magazine, and then his father sent him a Wall Street Journal article about José Manuel Mireles and the Autodefensas."The minute I read that article, I knew I wanted to create a parallel story of vigilantes on both sides of the border. I wanted to know what happens when government institutions fail and citizens feel like they have to take the law into their own hands."

The film was shot in Michoacán, southwest Mexico and in Arizona. Heineman was inspired by The Square in the making of the film.

== Reception ==
Cartel Land received very positive reviews from critics. Review aggregator website Rotten Tomatoes reports an 90% rating based on 99 reviews, and an average rating of 7.60/10. The site's consensus states: "Raw, brutal, and bitter, Cartel Land offers a ground-level look at vigilante efforts to thwart organized crime at the Mexican–American border." On Metacritic, the film has a 76 out of 100 rating based on 25 critics, indicating "generally favorable" reviews. Cartel Land appeared on over twenty critics' lists for best documentary and best film of 2015. It was listed as the #1 documentary of 2015 by Indiewire's The Playlist and by Paste Magazine, which also named Heineman as the best new filmmaker of the year. On December 1, the film was selected as one of 15 shortlisted for the Academy Award for Best Documentary Feature.

Heineman won the Best Director Award and Special Jury Award for Cinematography for the film in the U.S. Documentary Competition at the 2015 Sundance Film Festival, where the documentary premiered. He was presented the award for Outstanding Directorial Achievement in Documentary by the Directors Guild of America, as well as the 2015 Courage Under Fire Award for the film by the International Documentary Association. The film was also nominated for Best Documentary at the 69th British Academy Film Awards and for the Academy Award for Best Documentary Feature at the 88th Academy Awards. The film received the 2015 Documentary Film Award from the George Polk Awards in Journalism.

On February 12, 2015, Orchard Films acquired the rights to the film. Cartel Land was released theatrically in the summer of 2015 and aired on A&E on January 4, 2016.

=== Awards and nominations ===
Award	Category	Recipients and nominees	Result
Academy Awards	Best Documentary Feature	Matthew Heineman and Tom Yellin	Nominated
British Academy Film Awards	Best Documentary	Cartel Land	Nominated
Amsterdam International Documentary Film Festival	Audience Award	Cartel Land	Nominated
Ashland Independent Film Festival	Best Documentary	Cartel Land	Won
Austin Film Critics Association	Best Documentary	Cartel Land	Nominated
Broadcast Film Critics Association Awards	Best Documentary Feature	Cartel Land	Nominated
Champs-Élysées Film Festival	Best American Feature Film	Cartel Land	Nominated
Chicago Film Critics Association Awards	Best Documentary	Cartel Land	Nominated
Cinema Eye Honors Awards	Outstanding Achievement in Direction	Matthew Heineman	Nominated
Cinema Eye Honors Awards	Outstanding Achievement in Original Music Score	Jackson Greenberg and H. Scott Salinas	Nominated
Cinema Eye Honors Awards	Outstanding Achievement in Production	Cartel Land	Nominated
Cinema Eye Honors Awards	Outstanding Achievement in Cinematography	Matthew Heineman and Matt Porwoll	Won
Cinema Eye Honors Awards	Outstanding Achievement in Nonfiction Feature Film	Cartel Land	Nominated
Creative Arts Emmy Awards	Exceptional Merit in Documentary Filmmaking	Cartel Land	Won
Creative Arts Emmy Awards	Outstanding Sound Editing for Nonfiction Programming (Single or Multi-Camera)	Cartel Land	Won
Creative Arts Emmy Awards	Outstanding Cinematography for Nonfiction Programming	Matthew Heineman and Matt Porwoll	Won
Creative Arts Emmy Awards	Outstanding Directing for Nonfiction Programming	Matthew Heineman	Nominated
Creative Arts Emmy Awards	Outstanding Picture Editing for Nonfiction Programming	Matthew Hamachek, Matthew Heineman, Bradley J. Ross, and Pax Wassermann	Nominated
Dallas International Film Festival	Best Feature Documentary Award	Cartel Land	Nominated
Directors Guild of America	Outstanding Directorial Achievement in Documentary	Matthew Heineman	Won
Florida Film Critics Circle Awards	Best Documentary	Cartel Land	Nominated
George Polk Awards	Documentary Film of 2015	Cartel Land	Won
Gotham Awards	Best Documentary	Cartel Land	Nominated
Hamburg Film Festival	Political Film Award	Cartel Land	Nominated
Houston Film Critics Society Awards	Best Documentary Feature	Cartel Land	Nominated
Indiewire Critics' Poll	Best Documentary	Cartel Land	Nominated
International Documentary Association	Courage Under Fire Award	Matthew Heineman	Won
Italia Film Festival	Best Documentary	Cartel Land	Won
Little Rock Film Festival	Best Documentary	Cartel Land	Nominated
Milwaukee Film Festival	Best Film	Cartel Land	Nominated
Moscow International Film Festival	Best Documentary Film	Cartel Land	Won
New Hampshire Film Festival	Best Documentary Film	Cartel Land	Won
Online Film Critics Society Awards	Best Documentary	Cartel Land	Nominated
Phoenix Critics Circle	Best Documentary Film	Cartel Land	Nominated
Reykjavik International Film Festival	Audience Award	Cartel Land	Won
San Diego Film Critics Society Awards	Best Documentary	Cartel Land	Won
Satellite Awards	Best Motion Picture, Documentary	Cartel Land	Nominated
Seattle Film Critics Awards	Best Documentary	Cartel Land	Nominated
Sheffield International Documentary Festival	Tim Hetherington Award	Cartel Land	Won
Sheffield International Documentary Festival	Grand Jury Award	Cartel Land	Nominated
St. Louis Film Critics Association	Best Documentary Film	Cartel Land	Nominated
Stockholm Film Festival	Best Documentary	Cartel Land	Nominated
Sundance Film Festival	Special Jury Cinematography Award	Matthew Heineman and Matt Porwoll	Won
Sundance Film Festival	Directing Award	Matthew Heineman	Won
Vancouver Film Critics Circle	Best Documentary	Cartel Land	Nominated
Washington DC Area Film Critics Association Awards	Best Documentary	Cartel Land	Nominated

== See also ==
- Grupos de Autodefensa Comunitaria
- Narco Cultura
