= Ruralista =

Ruralista (Spanish and Portuguese for "Ruralist") may refer to:

- Liga Federal de Acción Ruralista, 1950s—1964 Uruguayan political movement adherent to ruralism
- Partido Ruralista Oriental, 1978 right-wing Bolivian political party
- União Democrática Ruralista, Right-wing Brazilian political party

== See also ==
- Rurales (disambiguation)
