= Charro =

Traditional horseman of Mexico

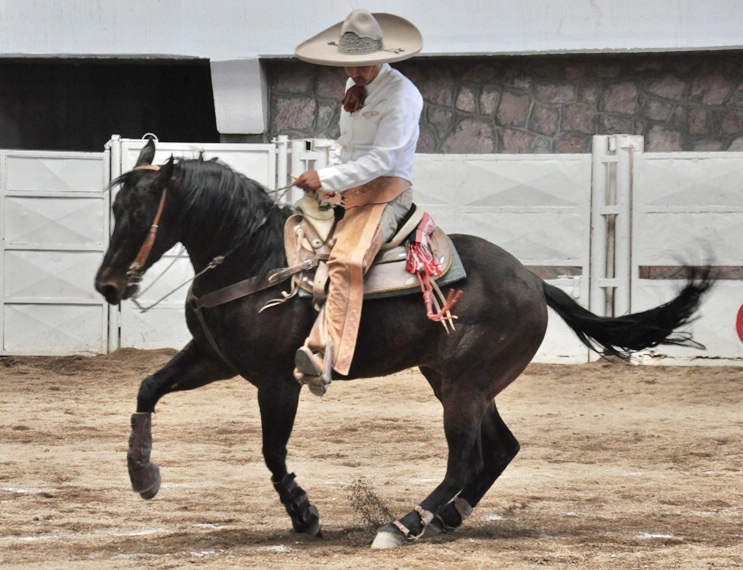
A charro on his horse

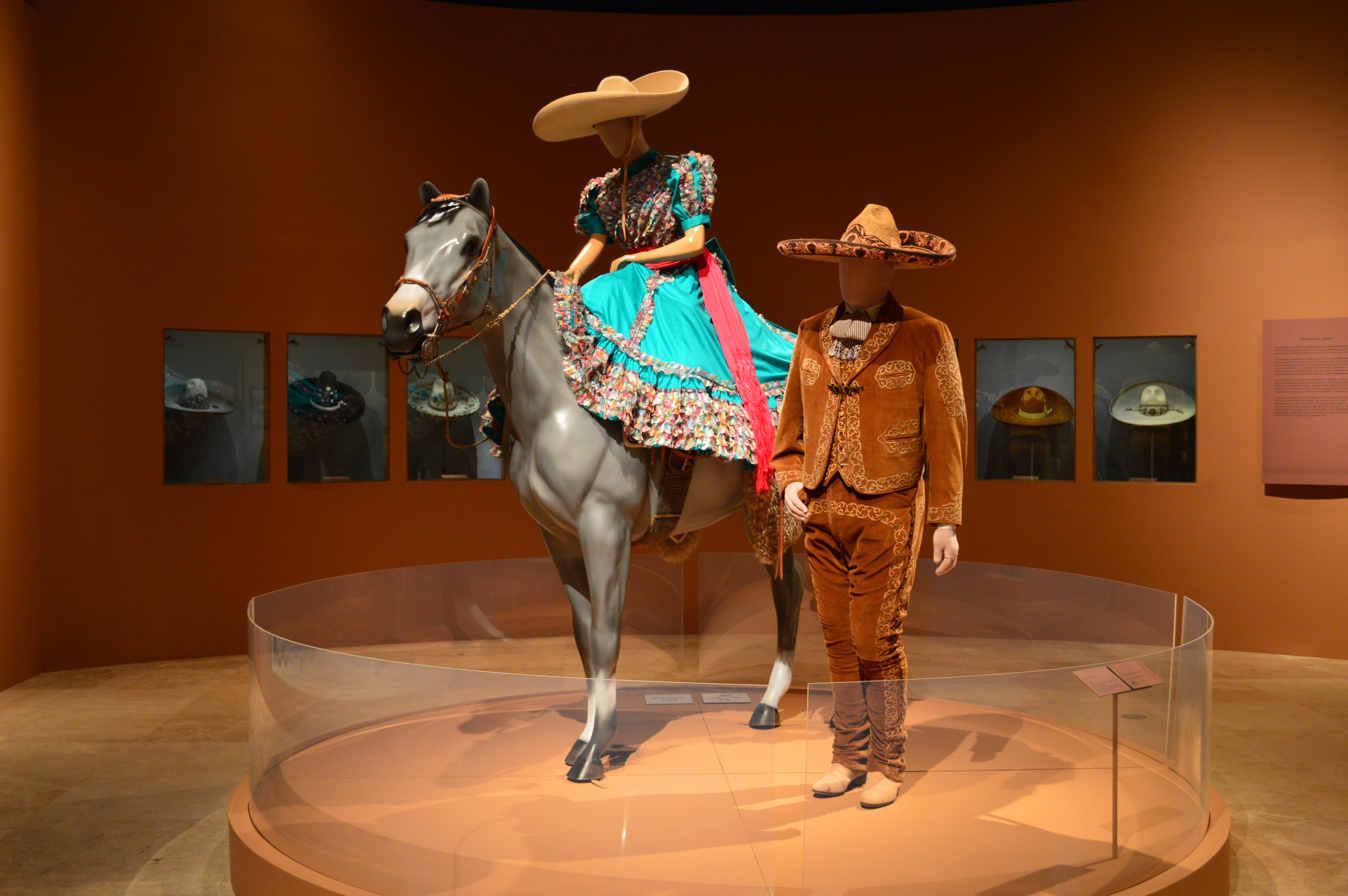
Female and male charro regalia, including sombreros de charro

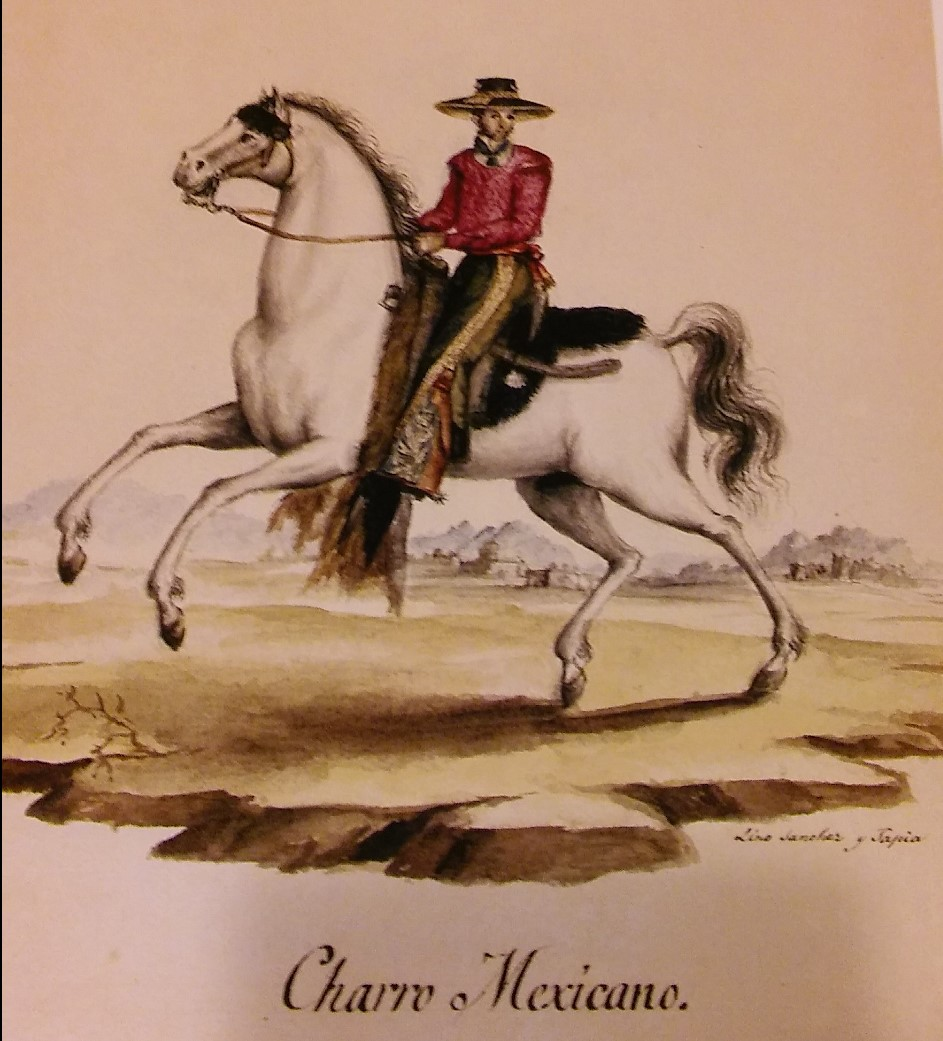
Mexican Charro (1828). Originally, the term "Charro" was a derogatory name for the Mexican Rancheros, the inhabitants of the countryside. The term is synonymous with the English terms "yokel", "hick", "country bumpkin", or "rube".

Charro is a Mexican term that has been used historically to describe the horseman from the countryside, the ranchero, who lived and worked in the haciendas and performed all his tasks on horseback, working mainly as vaqueros and caporales, among other jobs. They were renowned for their superb horsemanship, their skill in handling the lasso, and for their unique costume designed specially for horseback riding. Today, this name is given to someone who practices charreada (similar to a rodeo), which is considered the national sport of Mexico and which maintained traditional rules and regulations in effect from colonial times up to the Mexican Revolution.

== Etymology ==
The oldest records of the word "charro" date back to the 16th century. It appears as a word in the Portuguese and Galician languages, with a derogatory meaning, synonymous with "foolish", "stupid", "idiot", "vile", and "despicable". The Castilian writer Vicente de Olea compiled the word in his "Vocablos Gallegos Escuros" (Obscure Galician Words) in 1536, where he defined it as "crazy." The Spanish paremiologist Hernán Núñez defined it as a synonym of "fool" and specified that it was a word of Galician origin in his work "Refranes, o Proverbios en Romance" (1555).

The word was first documented in Spanish in 1627 in the book Vocabulario de refranes y frases proverbiales by Gonzalo Correas, based on the texts of Hernán Núñez. Here also, it had a derogatory connotation, synonymous with "fool", "stupid", "foolish", or "imbecile". More than a hundred years later, in 1729, the word would be included in the first dictionary edited and published by the Real Academia Española (RAE), the Diccionario de Autoridades, where it would be defined as a derogatory adjective used to refer to people from the countryside, villages, or rural areas, synonymous with yokel and "rustic":

The uneducated and unpolished person, raised in a place of little policing. In the Court, and in other places, they give this name to any person from the countryside.

In the first edition of the RAE dictionary published in 1780, that definition was maintained, defining the word as: "the rough and rustic person, as villagers tend to be"; but they would add a second meaning for the first time: "adjective that is applied to some things that are too laden with decoration and in bad taste". Thus, the word "charro" was used in the 18th century as an insult or derogatory nickname for country folk, who were considered coarse, rude, and rustic; and for things that overly decorated and in bad taste; synonymous with the English words: "hick", "bumpkin", "yokel", "boor", "garish", "gaudy", "tasteless" and "ridiculous".

In 1745, the Basque Jesuit, Manuel Larramendi, argued the word was of Basque origin, and it meant, "vile and despicable thing." He wrote that country people and villagers were called that word out of contempt.

The historian and philosopher Antonio de Capmany y Montpalau, argued that the origin of the word was Arabic and that it originally meant, "bad of moral malice and of customs," passing on to the Spanish to mean "artistic malice." Thus something "charro" is the same as something gaudy and tasteless.

In Mexico, the word has been documented since the late 18th century, originally used as a derogatory term to refer to the Rancheros, the horsemen who inhabited the countryside and haciendas, who carried out all their tasks on horseback; as country people, they were perceived as ignorant, crude, and unsophisticated. Over time, the word charro evolved in Mexico until it was redefined, going from a derogatory adjective to a complimentary noun, synonymous with Ranchero, skilled vaquero, and superb horseman. In 1850, the Spanish historian and writer Niceto de Zamacois, based in Mexico, defined what Charro meant in Mexico:

Charros: gente del campo que se compone mucho para montar á caballo (country people who are very well formed to ride a horse).

== Origins ==
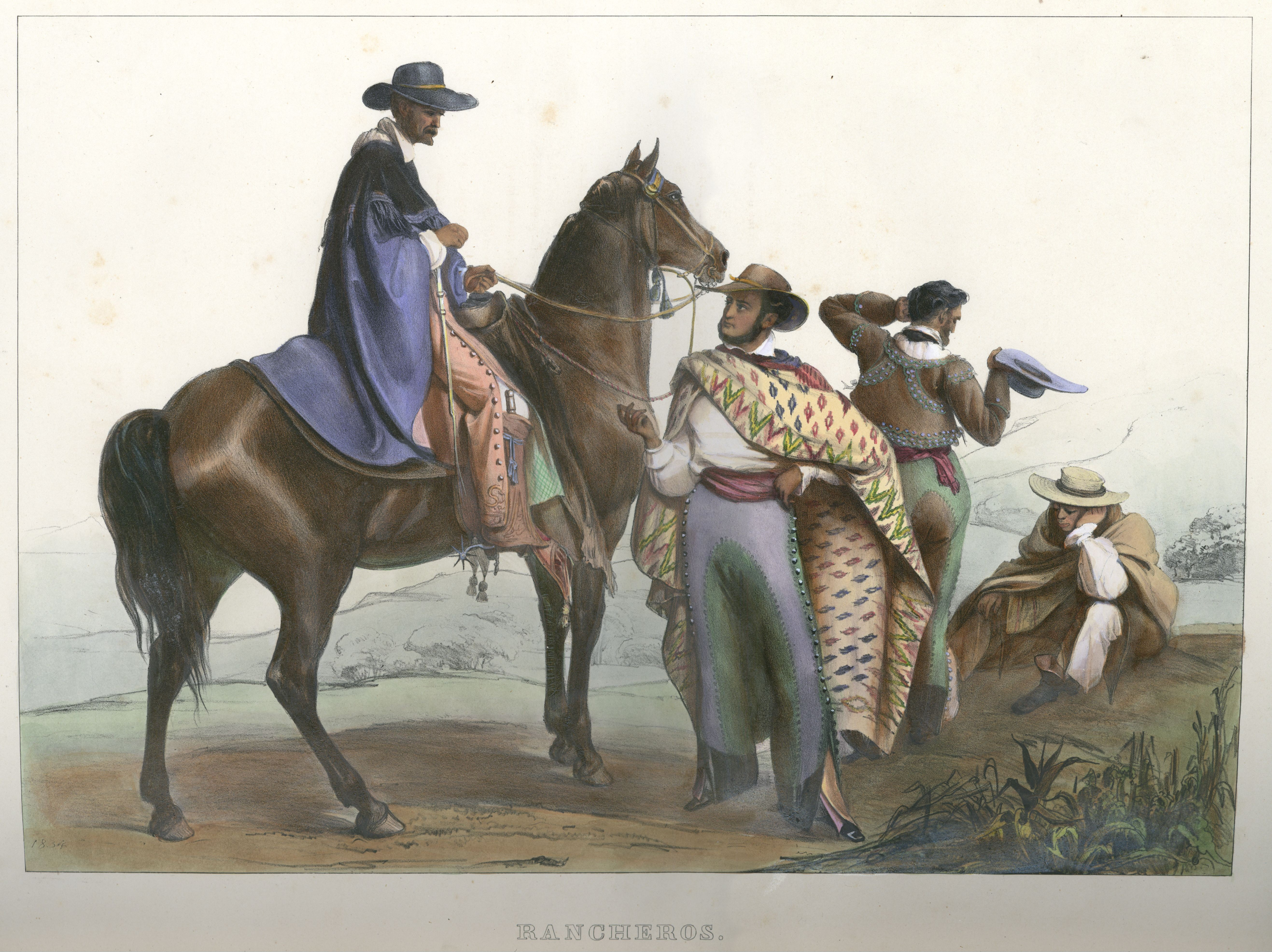
A picture of 1830's Charros, from Voyage pittoresque et archéologique dans la partie la plus intéressante du Mexique. 1834

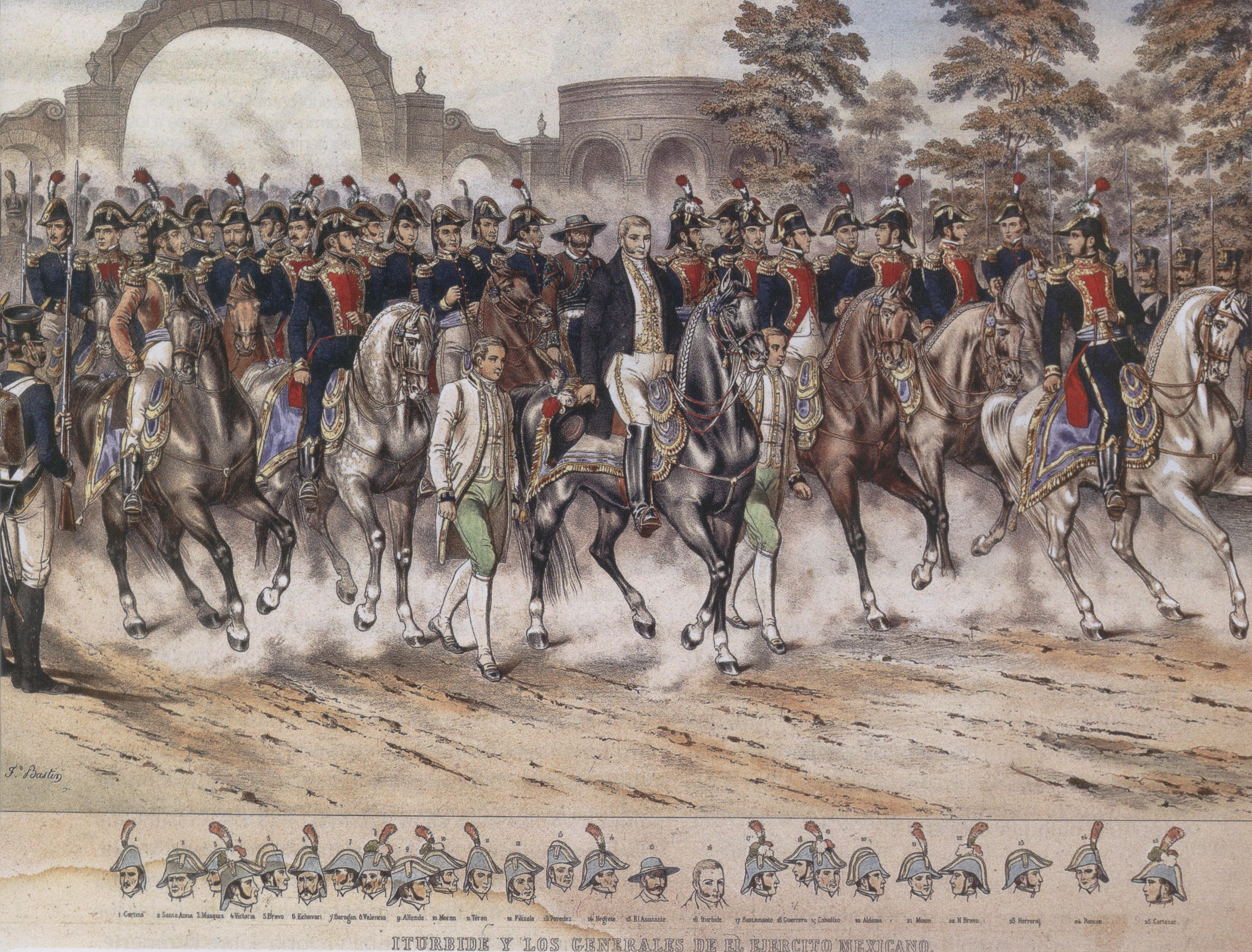
After the Mexican War of Independence was over one of the major generals Agustín de Iturbide rides into Mexico City victoriously with his generals many of which were charros that served in his army.

The Viceroyalty of New Spain had prohibited Native Americans from riding or owning horses, with the exception of the Tlaxcaltec nobility, other allied chieftains, and their descendants. However, raising cattle required the use of horses; farmers would hire cowboys for this task. These cowboys were preferably mestizo and rarely, Indians. Some of the requirements for riding horses were being employed by a plantation, needing to use saddles that differed from saddles used by the military, and needing to wear leather clothing: this is where the term "cuerudo" (leathered one) originated.

Over time, landowners and their employees began to adapt the cowboy style to the Mexican terrain and climate, evolving away from the Spanish style of cattle raising. This process began with those living in the Mexican Plateau and later spread to the rest of the country. After the Mexican War of Independence horse riding grew in popularity. Many riders of mixed race became mounted mercenaries, messengers and plantation workers. Originally known as Chinacos, these horsemen later became the modern "vaqueros". Wealthy plantation owners would often acquire decorated versions of the distinctive Charro clothing and horse harnesses to display status in the community. Poor riders would equip their horses with harnesses made from agave or would border their saddles with chamois skin.

== Mexican War of Independence and the 19th century ==
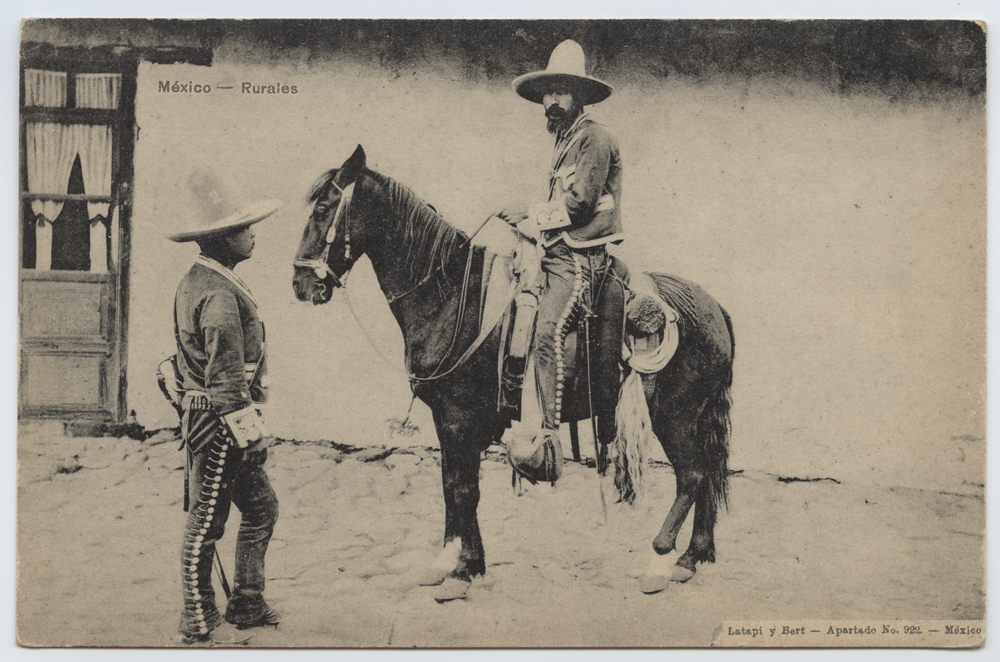
Two policemen of the rurales in charro style uniform c1890. Photo Abel Briquet

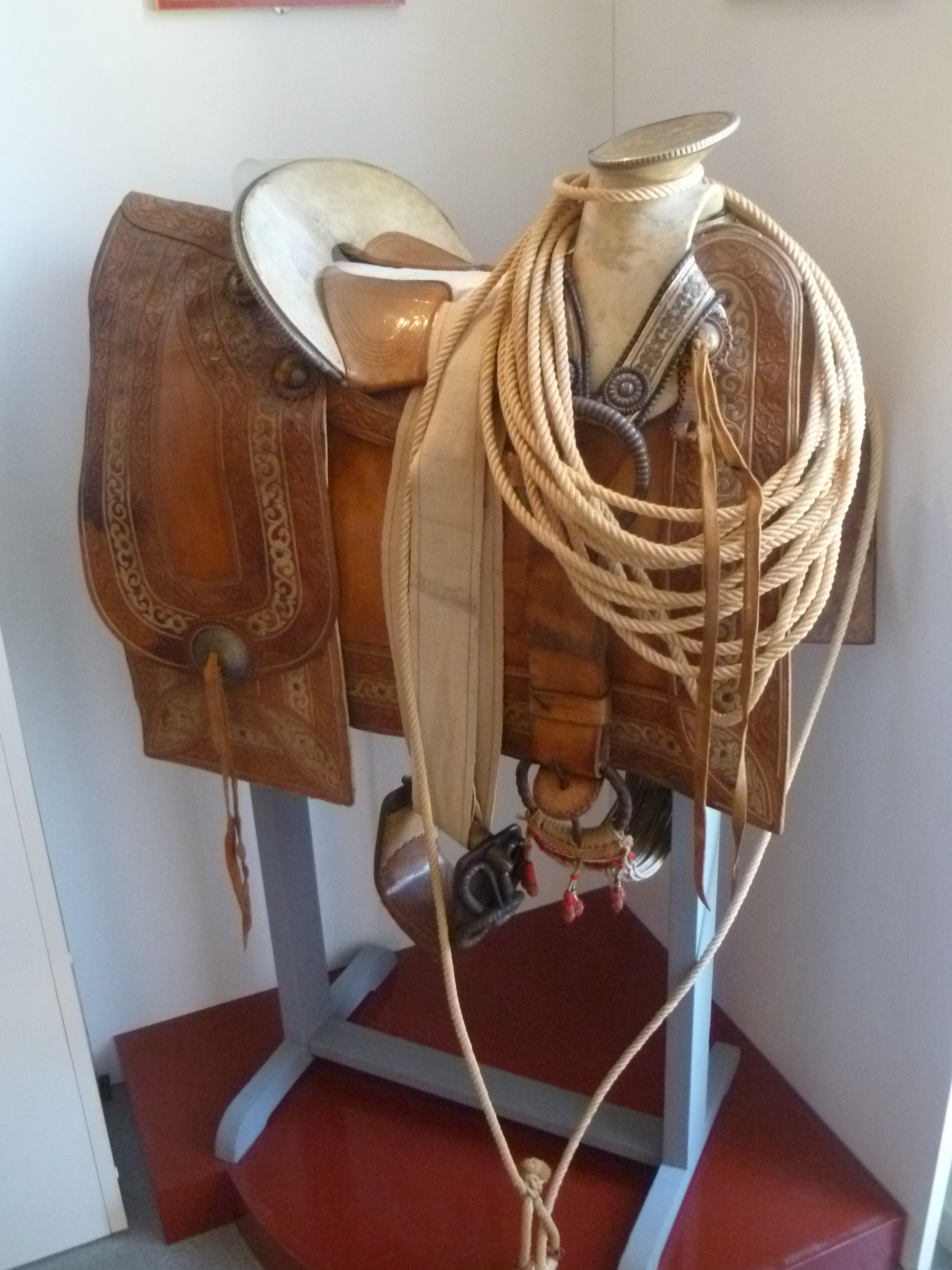
Saddle of a charro (Mexico, 19th century)

At the start of the Mexican War of Independence, beginning in 1810 and continuing for 11 years, charros were important soldiers for both sides of the war. Many haciendas, or Spanish owned estates, had long traditions of using their best charros as a small militia to fend off bandits and marauders from the estate. When the War began, many haciendas maintained their own armies to attempt fending off early struggles for independence.

After independence was achieved in 1821, political disorder made establishing law and order difficult in much of Mexico. Large bands of bandits plagued the early 19th century due to the lack of legitimate methods for social mobility. One of the most notable gangs were called "the silver ones" or the "plateados." These thieves dressed like traditional wealthy charros, adorning their clothing and saddles with silver, channeling the image of elite horseman. The bandit gangs would disobey or buy out government, establishing their own profit and rules.

Towards the mid 19th century, President Juárez established the "rurales," or mounted rural police, to crack down on gangs and enforce national law across Mexico. These rurales helped to establish the charro image of manhood, strength, and nationhood.

During the Second Mexican Empire, Maximilian I of Mexico reigned as emperor and enjoyed wearing a charro suit as the national costume to ingratiate himself with his subjects. He was an avid and skilled horseman and impressed the local charros. Emperor Maximilian himself designed the elegant all black charro traje, or costume, marking it as acceptable attire for formal occasions. Charros and mariachi ensembles still use this attire in modern days.

Charros were quickly seen as national heroes as Mexican politicians in the late 19th century. They pushed for the romanticized charro lifestyle and image as an attempt to unite the nation after conservative and liberal clashes.

== Early twentieth-century usage ==
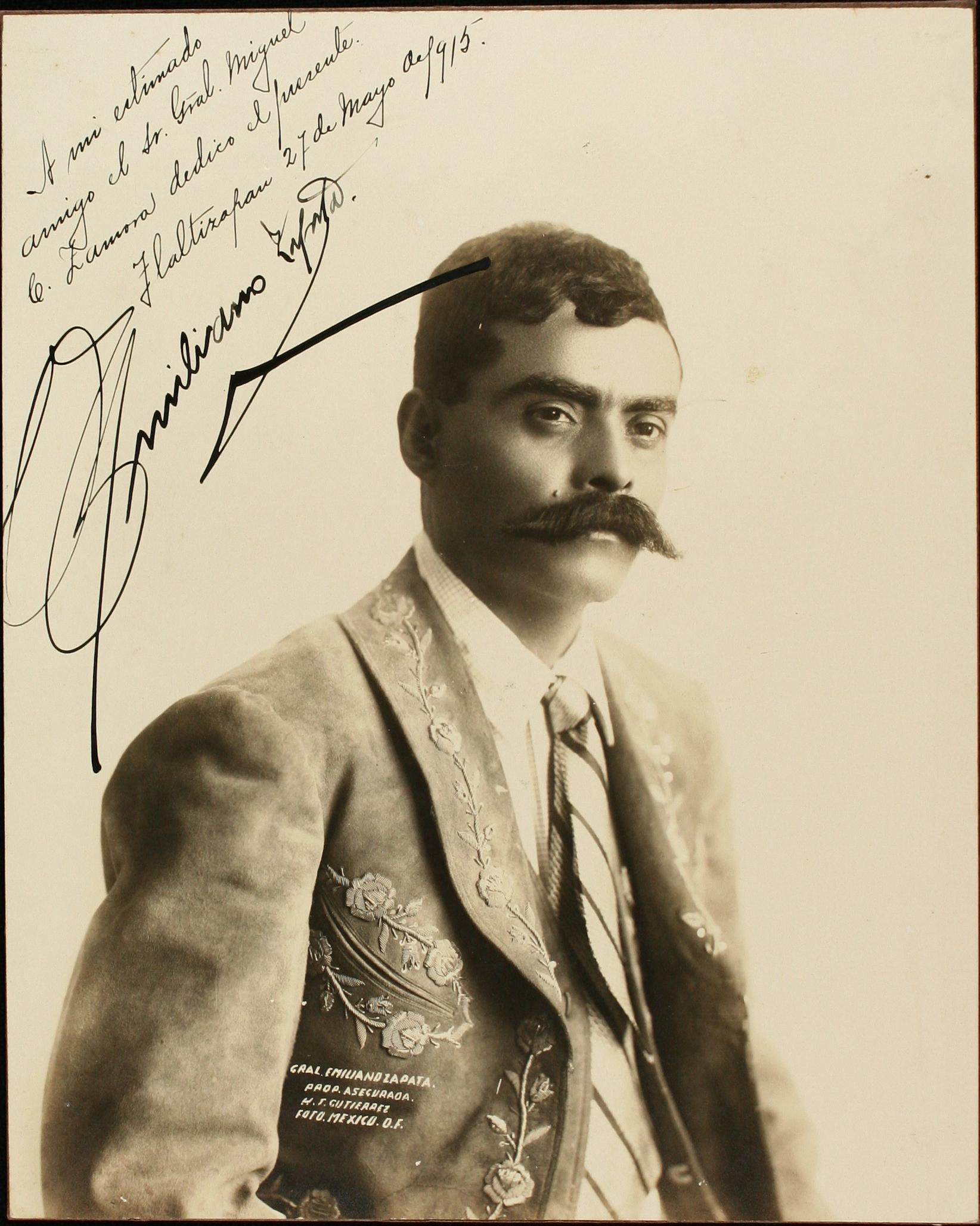
Emiliano Zapata wearing a charro suit

Prior to the Mexican Revolution of 1910, the distinctive charro suit was widely worn by men of the affluent upper classes on social occasions, especially when on horseback. This outfit often included a sombrero, sarape, heavily embroidered jacket and tightly cut trousers. A light grey version with silver embroidery and buttons was the uniform of the rurales (mounted rural police).

The most notable example of 'charrería' is General Emiliano Zapata, known before the revolution as a skilled horseback rider and horse tamer.

Although it is said that charros originated in Jalisco, Mexico, it was not until the 1930s, as rural people began moving towards the cities, that charrería became a formal sport with rules. During this time, paintings of charros also became popular.

During World War II, an army of 150,000 charros was created, the "Legión de Guerrilleros Mexicanos", in anticipation of an eventual attack from German forces. It was led by Antolin Jimenez Gamas, president of the National Association of Charros, a former soldier of Pancho Villa during the Mexican Revolution who climbed the ranks to Lieutenant Colonel in the Personal Guard of Villa's Dorados.

== Use of term ==
Although the word charro was originally a derogatory term for country people (synonymous with the English words yokel or bumpkin, and gaudy), it evolved independently in different countries, becoming a demonym for the people of the province of Salamanca in Spain (also known as Campo Charro), especially in the areas of Alba de Tormes, Vitigudino, Ciudad Rodrigo, and Ledesma. It also became a noun synonymous with the name Ranchero, the horse-mounted people of the Mexican countryside. In other parts of Latin America, it retained its original derogatory meaning. In Puerto Rico, charro is a generally accepted slang term to mean someone or something that is obnoxiously out of touch with social norms or current styles, similar to the United States usage of dork(y), (i.e. gaudy). The traditional Mexican charro is known for colorful clothing and participating in coleadero y charreada, a specific type of Mexican rodeo. The charreada is the national sport in Mexico, and is regulated by the Federación Mexicana de Charrería.

== In cinema ==
The "charro film" was a genre of the Golden Age of Mexican cinema between 1935 and 1959, and may have played a large role in popularizing the image of the charro, akin to what occurred with the cowboy in the advent of the American Western. The most notable charro stars were José Alfredo Jiménez, Pedro Infante, Jorge Negrete, Antonio Aguilar, and Tito Guizar. The 1969 Western film Charro! was Elvis Presley's only movie in which he did not sing on-screen. The film featured no songs at all other than his voice singing "Charro!" over the main title and opening credits as gunslinger Presley rides into town. It was also the only movie in which Presley wore a beard. The film's promotion read, 'A different kind of role, a different kind of man'.

== Modern day ==
In all the states of Mexico and in some US states, like California, Texas, and Illinois, charros participate in tournaments to show off their skill. These tournaments are either team competitions, known as charreada, or individual competitions, such as coleadero. These events are practiced in a Lienzo charro.

Some decades ago, charros in Mexico were permitted to carry guns. In conformity with current law, the charro must be fully suited and be a fully pledged member of Mexico's Federación Mexicana de Charrería.

== See also ==
- Charro Days
- Charro outfit
- Cowboy
- Sombrero
- Sombrero Festival
- Frijoles charros
