= Grupos de autodefensa comunitaria =

Self defense group in Mexico

Grupos de autodefensas
- Founders: Hipólito Mora, Alberto Gutiérrez, José Manuel Mireles Valverde and others (in Michoacán, Guerrero and the surrounding regional areas)
- Founded: 2012/2013
- Country: Mexico
- Allegiance: Mexican government (in part, since 2013)
- Status: Active
- Part of: SEDENA and State Police (in part, since 2013)

Grupos de autodefensas (self-defenders groups) or Policía Comunitaria (Community Police) or Policía Popular (People's Police) are vigilante self-defense groups partially transformed into state-sponsored paramilitary forces that arose on parts of the Gulf and Southern Mexico regions between 2012 and 2013. The Mexican government has attempted to monitor and absorb these groups into the federal government to act as Rural Police in order to avoid clashes between the paramilitaries and the Mexican Armed Forces itself.

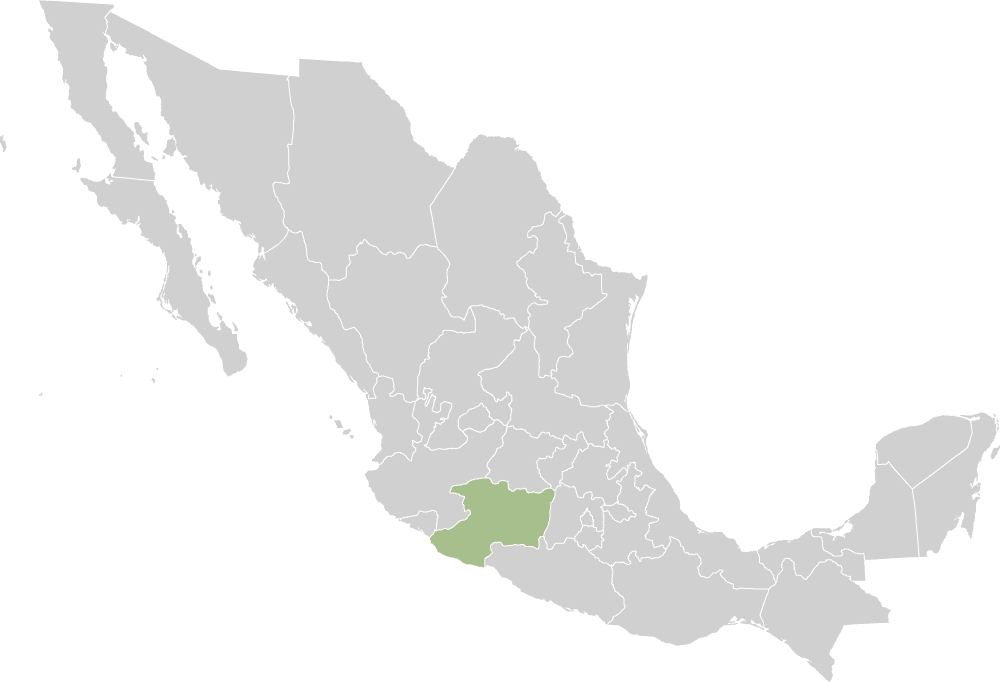
Michoacán state

== Background ==
The presidential administration of Felipe Calderón Hinojosa (2006–2012) began a fight against drug cartels in the state of Michoacán. The primary resource used in the fight was the anti-drug joint police and military initiative known as Operation Michoacán. However, even though in states such as Tamaulipas or Veracruz killings by criminal and military power declined significantly, the campaign against organized crime has caused violent response, increasing the vulnerability of the civilian population due to skirmishes between these organizations and the federal forces.

== History ==
When the criminal groups known as Los Zetas took over the streets of Michoacán from the previously dominant criminal groups in this state, a local criminal gang La Familia Michoacana was created to oust them and to take back control of the area.

The first notable self-defense event occurred on April 15, 2011, when a group of indigenous people in Cherán armed with rocks and fireworks attacked a bus carrying illegal loggers armed with rifles and associated with the Mexican drug cartel La Familia Michoacana. The indigenous people assumed control over the town, expelled the police force and blocked roads leading to oak timber on a nearby mountain. The vigilante activity spread to the nearby community of Opopeo. They established self-defence groups. Mexico has recognized Cherán as an autonomous indigenous community, but criminals continued to murder residents in the forest.

When power vacuum occurred La Familia Michoacana fell into infighting and disintegrated, its former members created the Knights Templar Cartel. At first this new criminal group had the support of civil society, believing their promises of protection from Los Zetas, but soon began to commit the same atrocities committed by La Familia Michoacana and Los Zetas: they began to extort, kidnap, murder and rape civilians, leading to a situation of semi slavery.

For this reason, on February 24, 2013 Hipólito Mora, Estanislao Beltrán and some land-owners, like a doctor from the community of Tepalcatepec José Manuel Mireles Valverde and Alberto Gutiérrez, took up arms against the Templar Cartel and all criminal groups that wanted to impose dominance in the area, entering a new phase in the war against drug trafficking.

As civilian open-carry of weapons is restricted in Mexico and military-grade weapons are illegal, federal forces could not legally distinguish between armed-civilian convoys and drug-cartel convoys, they started a hard process of regularization of these militias.

Some defense groups and their members were absorbed into a Rural law enforcement-like militia formation that answers to the Mexican Army (SEDENA) and also registered their weapons; some were newly issued legal weapons by the government.

Other members did not join, arguing fear of disarmament and distrust in the government that left them alone for so long. The groups are currently divided into registered (Rurales) and non-registered groups (Autodefensas), some of the last are being persecuted by the authorities for failing to register their heavy weapons.

This had led to armed clashes between factions, both factions state that they are being betrayed by their former colleagues, or that some members of the opposite faction have ties with the cartels, in an attempt to legitimize their actions.

== Leadership ==
The principal founder of the community self-defense forces in Michoacán and Guerrero was José Manuel Mireles Valverde, a doctor from Michoacán. Doctor Mireles was charismatic and well equipped to lead the Autodefensas groups because of his political experience with the Institutional Revolutionary Party. Dr Mireles was critically injured in a plane crash in 2014 which made him unable to continue his previous role as leader of the Autodefensas. After a few months, Mireles returned to the Autodefensas. At this time the Mexican government ordered the Autodefensas to disarm. Many other leaders of the Autodefensas groups complied and Mireles tried to flee the country but was arrested by the Mexican government in late June 2014.

Another important leader of the community self-defense forces in Michoacán and Guerrero was Estanislao Beltrán-Torres who was nicknamed "Papa Smurf", who took the main leadership in the time Mireles was injured. While Beltrán-Torres was charismatic, he did not have the same aptitude for leadership that Dr. Mireles had and he began to lose control of the Autodefensas. When the government ordered the Autodefensas to disarm and join the Rurales, Beltrán-Torres decided to obey.

A third important leader of the community self-defense forces in Michoacán and Guerrero was Nicolás Sierra Santana, or "El Gordo". Santana was originally a member of a subset of the Knights Templar Cartel but quickly joined the Autodefensas when he saw the Knights Templar begin to lose power. When the Mexican government ordered the Autodefensas to disarm and Mireles was arrested, Nicolás Sierra Santana, joined by many former Autodefensas, created a drug cartel called "Los Viagras" (which is now known to have ties and rivalry with the Jalisco New Generation Cartel).

== Corruption ==
As Autodefensas groups grew, it was hard to maintain a centralized group of militia leadership. Because of the lack of oversight of Autodefensas groups, these organizations began to be joined by former cartel members and people who felt above the law. One problem that Autodefensas groups faced was a lack of resources, specifically guns. Originally the weapons that Autodefensas managed to recover from skirmishes with cartels were sufficient to arm the vigilantes, as these groups got bigger this did not suffice. In order to arm themselves, many Autodefensas groups began to sell drugs in order to buy weapons.

When some Autodefensas groups began to sell drugs, a new cartel emerged from the Autodefensas. Today, this new cartel is called "Los Viagras" (known to have ties with the Jalisco New Generation Cartel) and is led by one of the former leaders of the Autodefensas, Nicolás Sierra Santana, who is also known as "El Gordo". Los Viagras has been criticized by the government as well as other cartels for their brutal killings and general violence. The infamy of Los Viagras cartel has made their leader, Nicolás Sierra Santana, one of the most wanted men in Mexico.

== Equipment ==
=== Communications ===
Autodefensas have been known to communicate by telephone with radios and shortwave radios. The "gabacha" is a radio transmitter and receiver they use to communicate among themselves and, as they also pick up signals from enemy groups, to spy on the imposters that also use this device. The most popular name for the device is "el escaner".

=== Armament ===
At first the original groups started with their legal small arms including hunting club rifles, muskets, and .22 caliber rifles (weapons statutorily permitted for farming and home self-defence by the Ministry of Defense), but as the groups started to defeat criminals, they also were gradually seizing military weapons (M4, AK47, MP5, G3, M60) as well as buying equipment from the black market sponsored by the wealthy of the region and other drug cartels fighting their common cartel enemies. They have even been seen with Barrett .50 caliber anti-materiel rifles. The Autodefensas were recognized as a fairly organized armed force with military small arms capability, while not being under federal government command, thus unconstitutional according to Mexican law. For this reason, the SEDENA ordered the disarmament of the Autodefensas, many autodefensas complied. They were ordered to register their weapons (those within the legal parameters of not being military-grade weapons) to the Ministry of Defense and keep those weapons for their individual home protection (as mandated by the Mexican law). Those who joined the rural guards were allowed to open carry (as any police force does), keep their weapons and were issued a standard M4 rifle.

Currently there are many complaints that special treatment is given to certain groups. These people argue that the Mexican bureaucracy only allows some groups to register and only offers government protection to some groups.

=== Vehicles ===
Autodefensas have different types of vehicles of different brands, mostly pickup trucks and SUVs confiscated from the cartels. They also have homemade armored vehicles.

== Clashes with the Federal Forces ==
- In late 2012 and early 2013, the self-defense groups in Michoacán took control of several towns to displace criminal groups such as the Caballeros Templarios, who charged a flat fee on local citizens and businesses. In each of the clashes the Autodefensas have used high caliber weapons, which have led to different conflicts with the Mexican Army.
- When newly emerged, they retained a group of SEDENA commanders, in an attempt to force dialogue and avoid being disarmed.
- There were clashes between soldiers and paramilitaries when first trying to disarm the Autodefensas.
- In a demonstration by the Autodefensas, a branch of the Mexican Army was surrounded and threatened by a crowd of protesters. The army shot several rounds at the unarmed crowd; the incident left 2 dead and 2 injured; the casualties have been identified by both the government and the Autodefensas as Michoacán cartel members who had infiltrated the protest to spy on the real Autodefensas.
- The government leader of the Rural Defense police, Alfredo Castillo Cervantes, was removed after rumors that a cartel bribed him to allow cartel members to join the organization and to spy on the Rural Police's members who were former Autodefensas. By late 2015, it was believed that all cartel members had been removed from the Rural Police groups. Castillo was reassigned to a position that gave him a kind of sports authority and was not investigated further.
- Hipólito Mora, a self-defense leader was arrested in early 2015 and charged for an alleged vigilante/revenge murder. He was released almost two months later.
- Dr. Mireles Valverde, the spokesman of the Self-Defense counsel, was arrested for collecting firearms not registered with the SEDENA.
- Groups of "La Ruana" Rural force became upset because most of their weapons have not been returned by the government, they claim to have few weapons to fight the heavily armed criminals.
- The government has declared that there are some fake-Autodefensas, not affiliated with the federal government (Castillo's; see above), that are actually working for the recently created Jalisco New-Generation Cartel.

== Regulation ==
Most self-defense groups have been converted into bodies of village guards or rural force, the first under the command of the SEDENA and the second under the command of the State Police, although several groups remain without registering their weapons.

== Known groups ==
The Community Police have several formations in the state of Guerrero, mainly in the region of the Costa-Chica hills and Mountain range, and in the town of Balsas, bordering the state of Morelos.

There are several groups in Michoacán, in the region of Tierra-Caliente, and also in the Cheran municipality (which has an indigenous-community based structure, very different to the rest of autodefensas) as well as in Chapala. In Jalisco and Tamaulipas some self-defense groups have appeared, but it is suspected that they are members of the Gulf Cartel and the Jalisco New Generation Cartel.

A group called "Pañuelo Negro" (English: Black Bandana) made itself known in January 2021 in Michoacan, making a total of 27 such groups in the state.

== See also ==
- Mexican drug war
- Gun politics in Mexico
- Rurales
- José Manuel Mireles Valverde
- Knights Templar Cartel
