= Arizona Border Recon =

American paramilitary group in Arizona

- Abbreviation: AZBR
- Formation: 2011
- Type: private non-governmental Paramilitary militia
- Location: Altar Valley, Arizona
- Key people: Tim Foley
- Volunteers: ~250 Volunteers (2018)
- Website: www.arizonaborderrecon.org

Arizona Border Recon (AZBR) is an American paramilitary militia group in Arizona composed of former military, law enforcement and private security contractors.

== History ==
Tim Foley, a former construction supervisor and United States Army veteran formed the group in 2011. As of March 2018, the group had 250 volunteers operating in the Altar Valley around Sasabe, Arizona, armed with personal weapons including pistols, shotguns and semi-automatic rifles. AZBR originally targeted illegal immigration, but as of 2015 had a stated goal of disrupting drug smuggling and trafficking across the United States–Mexico border and preventing infiltration by foreign terrorists.

Foley denies that it is a militia; however, the Arizona Daily Star has reported that "court records show he was intimately involved in militias that formed Operation Mutual Defense to help the Bundy family several years ago during its dispute with the federal government over the use of public land. They continue to detain and hold civilians along the border without any prosecutors bringing charges against them." The group was featured in the 2015 documentary Cartel Land. According to Chicago Film Critics Association member Bill Stamets, the documentary was inspired by a December, 2012 Rolling Stone report.

The group took part in the Mother of All Rallies held on September 16, 2017, at the National Mall in Washington, D.C. in support of President Donald Trump, where Foley was one of the speakers.

In August 2019, the expelled member Joshua Pratchard was sentenced with six years to prison for illegal gun ownership, manufacture of firearms and their sale. The militia expelled him, saying he did not want to follow their rules, including repeatedly asking to get physical with detainees and demanding to put a silencer on his weapon, and their recklessness when it comes to "stalking bandits".
