= Sombrero Festival =

Two-nation celebratory event

- Also called: Sombrero Fest
- Observed by: Matamoros, Tamaulipas; Brownsville, Texas
- Type: Cultural
- Date: Mid to late February

Sombrero Festival, also known as Sombrero Fest, is a two-nation fiesta and an annual three-day pre-Lenten celebration held in Brownsville, Texas, United States. The grito—a joyous Mexican shout—opens the festivities every year. This festival is a shared heritage celebration between the two border cities of Matamoros, Tamaulipas and Brownsville, Texas. This festival is designed to enhance the spirit of Charro Days, and to add to the festivities. The Sombrero Festival is held in Washington Park in Brownsville, Texas.

The Sombrero Festival was founded in Brownsville, TX, in 1986 by Danny Loff in order to enhance the spirit of Charro Days and to expand the activities available to the general public.

The Sombrero Festival includes a jalapeño-eating contest, 1-mile run/walk and a 5K run/walk, music and dancers, activities, numerous food stands and cooking contests. Several rock stars, corrido singers, and Tejano music entertainers perform in this annual event. During his campaign for president, Barack Obama made an unexpected visit to the Sombrero Festival in Brownsville, Texas, where he ate a Mexican torta, played games, and greeted voters. The event not only provides families with entertainment, but it also gives away money to charitable organizations and to fund public facilities in Brownsville, Texas.

Mr. Amigo Association, an organization that works for the friendly relationship with Matamoros, Tamaulipas, Mexico and Brownsville, Texas, United States and to preserve the Charro Days and Sombrero Festival celebrations, became a part of Charro Days in 1967. Sombrero Fest, a three-day Washington Park street party with popular rock, country and Tejano performers, was added in 1986. The first president of the Mr. Amigo Association was the former president of Mexico, Miguel Alemán Valdés.

During the creation of NAFTA agreement in 1988–1989, Congressman Solomon Ortiz presented the Mr. Amigo Association with the Mr. Amigo Review Award for the distinction of being one of the first organizations to extend friendship and mutual understanding between the United States and Mexico. The Mr. Amigo Review Award remains on exhibit at the Library of Congress in Washington, D.C. as a model of bi-national friendliness between these two countries.

Recently held in 2023, 2021 was held virtually for the first time in the festival's history due to the COVID-19 pandemic.

== See also ==
- Charro
- Sombrero
- Charro Days
- Mexican American
- Culture of Mexico
