= Hipólito Mora =

Mexican farmer and politician (1955–2023)

Personal details
- Born: Hipólito Mora Chávez; 26 July 1955 Buenavista Tomatlán, Michoacán, Mexico
- Died: 29 June 2023 (aged 67) La Ruana, Buenavista, Michoacán, Mexico
- Manner of death: Assassination by gunshots
- Political party: Citizens' Movement (2015–2018); Solidarity Encounter Party (2020–2023)

Hipólito Mora Chávez (26 July 1955 – 29 June 2023) was a Mexican farmer and politician. He founded a vigilante self-defense group in his town of La Ruana in response to cartel activity in the region, specifically by the Knights Templar Cartel. People in La Ruana were tired of the cartel's kidnappings and threats and its control of the harvesting and sale of limes grown by local farmers.

After fighting the cartel for months without any help, his group received help from Mexican troops and drove out the cartel from Michoacán between 2013 and 2014. He was one of the few fighters to remain in La Ruana after the cartel was expelled.

He was ambushed and assassinated by gunmen on La Ruana on 29 June 2023.

== Biography ==
Mora was the gubernatorial nominee for the Solidarity Encounter Party in the 2021 Michoacán elections.

In 2022, Mora said that the situation in Michoacán had become worse than it was in 2013. By that time, the Knights Templar Cartel had been replaced by Carteles Unidos. According to Mora, many vigilante forces were later infiltrated by the cartels, the federal government of Mexico was focused on fighting the Jalisco Cartel and was not doing much to fight homegrown cartels in Michoacán, and gang violence was worse than ever.

=== Foundation of the Self-Defense Groups ===
According to Hipólito himself, the Knights Templar cartel took over the lemon orchards of the town, they decided which days they could harvest, and which days they could not.

Mora saw his son Manuel Mora, lying in a hammock with his hands on his head, when he asked him what was wrong with him, his son replied that the owners of the packing houses had not received his harvest. Immediately Hipólito took his pistol and went to the owner of the packing house to complain about what happened to his son, there, the owner of the packing house stressed that the real bosses were the Templars, to which Mora replied: I don't care, tomorrow you receive my son, I don't know how you are going to do it. After what happened, Hipólito Mora receives a phone call from a friend from Tepacaltepec with whom he had planned the uprising years ago, who told him (there are already people interested in talking to you) a few weeks later, exactly, La Ruana was the first locality to take up arms against the Knights Templar cartel on February 24, 2013. Buenavista Tomatlán joined a few weeks later. Hipólito hired an advertising vehicle, inviting his neighbors to a meeting in the town center to encourage them to rise up against the Knights Templar.

The movement quickly gained momentum and spread to other municipalities in Michoacán. In an interview, Hipólito recounted how the movement began and how the first confrontations between the cartel and the Self-Defense Forces occurred.

=== Confrontations against drug trafficking ===
On December 16, 2014, there was a confrontation in La Ruana between the group led by Hipólito Mora and the group led by El Americano, resulting in 11 dead, including Hipólito Mora's son.

He was detained for having participated in the confrontation but was released again. After running as a candidate for a federal deputy position, Hipólito Mora returned home and focused on caring for his family, but according to Mora's words, his struggle is not over. In 2015, he was awarded the Citizen Merit Award for his actions against organized crime.

=== Political candidacies ===
In March 2015, Mora was announced by the Ciudadano Movement party as a candidate for federal deputy for the XII district of Michoacán based in Apatzingán, for the federal elections held in June of that year, although he ultimately was not elected in the voting. In 2018, he left the party due to differences with the national leadership because he was not named as a candidate on the proportional representation lists of that political institute.On December 9, 2020, he was elected as the candidate of the Encuentro Solidario Party for the governorship of Michoacán in the face of the 2021 state elections, and on March 11, 2021, his registration to contest in the elections was officially announced.

In the elections held on June 6, Mora received 54,794 votes in the state, equivalent to 3.13% of the votes cast, making it the fifth candidate in terms of votes received.

== Personal life ==
Hipólito Mora Chávez was imprisoned twice in the United States for drug possession and faced legal proceedings in the United States. He was arrested on June 22, 1989, to serve a four-year sentence for drug possession. In 1993, Mora Chávez was arrested for the second time and was deported to Mexico in 1995 due to his criminal record.

== Assassination ==
Mora was ambushed and shot to death on 29 June 2023, alongside three bodyguards, in La Ruana. Unidentified gunman cut off the vehicles of Mora and his bodyguards, opened fire and set Mora's vehicle on fire. His son was killed by the cartel in 2014 and he anticipated he would eventually be assassinated as well.
