= Cuerpo de Defensa Rural =

Mexican paramilitary force

Guardia Rural
- Active: 1920s–1950s (second stage); 1970s–present (modern)
- Country: Mexico
- Branch: Mexican Army
- Type: Gendarmerie
- Nickname: Rurales
- Engagements: Cristero War; Mexican drug war

Rurales is the common name for the Cuerpo de Defensa Rural (Rural Defense Corps) a Mexican part-time reserve paramilitary force of the Mexican Army.

== Origins ==
Cuerpo de Defensa Rural was originally formed as village self-defence groups during the agrarian disturbances of the 1920s. They do not have any functions that parallel those of the paramilitary mounted police force of the 1861–1914 era. This corps was formed under army jurisdiction according to the Organic Law of 1926. Its origins, however, date back to the period when the revolutionary agrarian reform program was first implemented in 1915. In efforts to protect themselves against the private armies of recalcitrant, large landowners, rural peasants organized themselves into small defence units and were provided with weapons by the revolutionary government. Until 1955 enlistment in the Rural Defence Force was restricted to peasants working on collective farms (ejidos). After 1955 participation in the Rural Defence Force was expanded to include small farmers and labourers. All defence units, however, were attached to ejidos, possibly as a means to guarantee control.

== Modern Rurales ==
The number of Rural Defence Force (Rural Police Force) enlistments was 120,000 (80,000 mounted and 40,000 dismounted) in 1970 but was being phased out in the 1990s. The IISS's The Military Balance listed the corps as having only 14,000 members in 1996. The volunteers, aged eighteen to fifty, enlist for a three-year period. Members initially did not wear uniforms or receive pay for their service but are eligible for limited benefits. They are armed with outmoded rifles, such as the Mosquetón Mod. 1954, which may be the main inducement to enlist. Rudimentary training is provided by troops assigned to military zone detachments.

The basic unit is the pelotón of eleven members under immediate control of the ejido. Use of the unit outside the ejidos is by order of the military zone commander. One asset of the corps is the capacity of its members to gather intelligence about activities within the ejidos and in remote rural areas seldom patrolled by military zone detachments. Corps members also act as guides for military patrols, participate in civic-action projects, and assist in destroying marijuana crops and preventing the transport of narcotics through their areas.

Currently Rural Defence Force members are being utilized in the Mexican drug war. This is the case in the State of Michoacán, where the Government has attempted to restrict civilian vigilantism (such as the creation of unregulated armed security groups) by deploying rurales against local drug cartels.
