= Charro Days =

Annual fiesta celebration in Brownsville, Texas

Charro Day Festival
- Also called: Charro Days Festival; Charro Days Fiesta
- Observed by: Matamoros, Tamaulipas; Brownsville, Texas
- Type: Cultural
- Date: Mid to late February
- Duration: 4 days
- Frequency: annual

Charro Days, also known as Charro Days Fiesta or Charro Days Festival, is a two-nation fiesta and an annual four-day pre-Lenten celebration held in Brownsville, Texas, United States in cooperation with Matamoros, Tamaulipas, Mexico. The grito—a joyous Mexican shout—opens the festivities every year. This festival is a shared heritage celebration between the two border cities of Brownsville, Texas and Matamoros, Tamaulipas. The Charro Days festivals usually have about 50,000 attendees each year. This celebration includes the Sombrero Festival as well as a parade that goes down Elizabeth St. through Historic Downtown Brownsville, TX.

== History ==
The festival was first organized in 1937 and celebrated in 1938 by the Brownsville Chamber of Commerce to recognize Mexican culture and honor the charros, or the "dashing Mexican gentlemen cowboys." In addition, it is stated in the official webpage that the Charro Days festival was also created to bring people together during the effects of the Great Depression. Although not proven, it is rumored that the first “unofficial” Charro Days was realized in the early to mid-1800s, when people from the city of Brownsville, Texas, and Matamoros, Tamaulipas, just across the Rio Grande in Mexico, came together to celebrate a cooperative cultural festival to honor the two nations.

The festival went on hiatus in 1942–45 & 2021.

== Traditions ==
The four-day festival has daily parades, food stands and music, people dancing in the street, boat races, fireworks, bull fights, and a rodeo in Brownsville and in its sister city of Matamoros.

=== Costumes ===
Costumes reflecting Mexico's tradition have been used by those who partake in the occasion. Men, for the most part, wear traditional Mexican costumes—whether it is the charro costume or a cowboy one—while women wear the colorful Huipil costume. The traditional costume is often worn by adults, elders, and children on all four days to celebrate and honor borderland heroes.

=== Events ===
Mr. Amigo Association, an organization that works for the friendly relationship with Matamoros, Tamaulipas, Mexico and Brownsville, Texas, United States and to preserve the Charro Days and Sombrero Festival celebrations, became a part of Charro Days in 1967. Sombrero Fest, a three-day Washington Park street party with food, popular rock, country and Tejano performers, was added in 1986. Moreover, it is worth mentioning that the first president of the Mr. Amigo Association was the former president of Mexico, Miguel Alemán Valdés.

During the creation of NAFTA agreement in 1988-1989, Congressman Solomon Ortiz presented the Mr. Amigo Association with the Mr. Amigo Review Award for the distinction of being one of the first organizations to extend friendship and mutual understanding between the United States and Mexico. The Mr. Amigo Review Award remains on exhibit at the Library of Congress in Washington, D.C. as a model of bi-national friendliness between these two countries.

== See also ==
- Charro
- Sombrero
- Sombrero Festival
