= Rurales =

Mexican paramilitary force

Guardia Rural
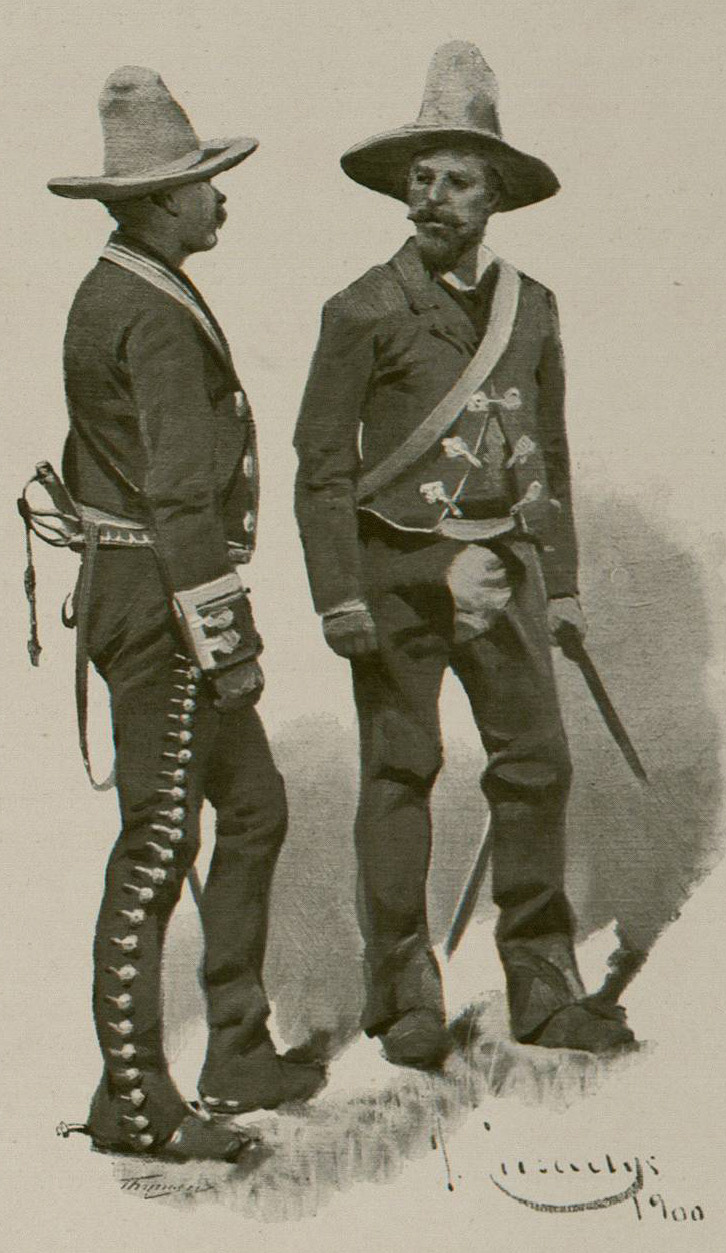
- Rurales in parade uniform during the Diaz era c. 1900.
- Active: 1861–1914 (first stage); 1920s–1950s (second stage); 1970s–present (modern)
- Country: Mexico
- Branch: Mexican Army
- Type: Gendarmerie
- Nickname: Rurales
- Engagements: Historic mounted police force: Franco-Mexican War; Mexican Indian Wars; Skeleton Canyon Massacre; Guadalupe Canyon Massacre; Garza Revolution; Cananea strike; Mexican Revolution; Modern militia: Cristero War; Mexican drug war

In Mexico, the term Rurales (Spanish) is used to refer to two armed government forces. The historic Guardia Rural ('Rural Guard') was a rural mounted police force, founded by President Benito Juárez in 1861 and expanded by President Porfirio Díaz (r. 1876–1911). Under Díaz, it served as an effective force of repression and a counterweight to the Mexican Army during the nineteenth and early twentieth centuries. The rurales were dissolved during the Mexican Revolution.

The modern Cuerpo de Defensa Rural ('Rural Defense Corps') is a modern part-time voluntary militia, generally used to support Federal forces.

== Rural Guard 1861–1914 ==
The Guardia Rural was established as a federal constabulary by the Liberal regime of Benito Juárez in 1861. This mounted rural police force became best known during the long rule of President Porfirio Díaz (1876–1911).

=== Origins ===
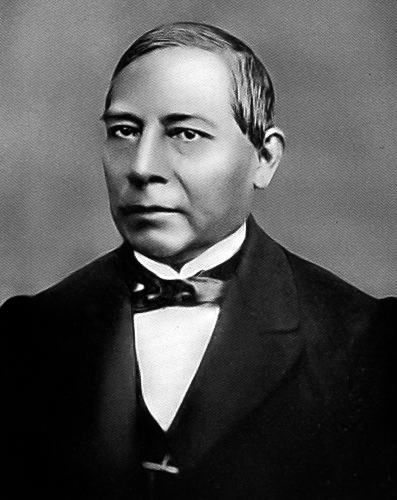
President Benito Juárez, founder of the rurales in 1861

As originally constituted under President Juárez the Rurales lacked the numbers and organization to effectively control the banditry widespread in Mexico during the 1860s and 1870s. The concept of an armed and mobile rural police organized on military lines, was derived from Spain's Civil Guard ("Guardia Civil"). Established in 1844 the Spanish Guardia Civil had quickly won a reputation as an effective but often oppressive force.

On May 6, 1861, four corps of Rural Police were authorized by the Juárez government; each having an establishment of 20 officers and 255 other ranks. Recruitment was intended to be by voluntary enlistment. Pay was set at a higher level than that of the conscript based army. Control of the new force was divided between the Ministers of the Interior and of War - a policy intended to maintain a balance of power within the government.

=== French intervention ===
The existing Corps of Rurales was absorbed into the Republican Army and irregular forces opposing the French intervention of 1862–1867. However the Imperial regime of Emperor Maximilian (1862–1867) created a parallel force known as the Resguardo, which by October 1865 numbered 12,263; indicating that the concept of a rural mounted police force had become well established. Following the Republican victory, Los Cuerpos Rurales were re-established.

=== Under Porfirio Diaz ===
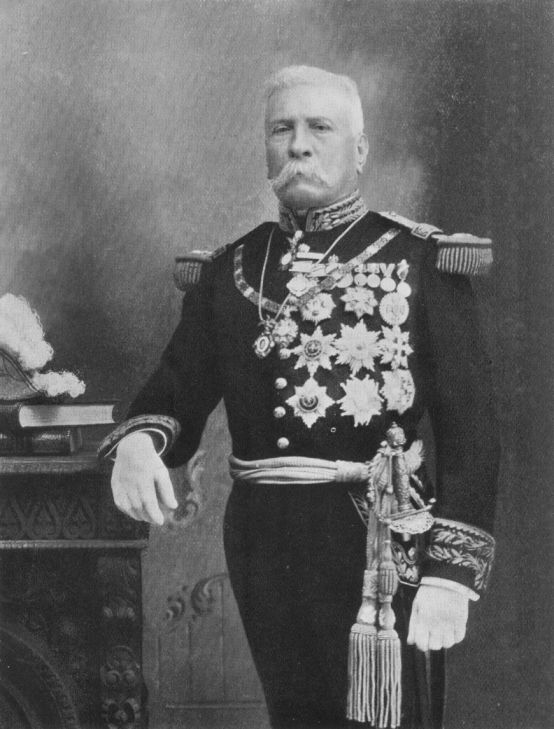
General Porfirio Díaz, President of Mexico, who expanded the use of the rurales to suppress rural unrest and create "order and progress."

Described as "well-mounted active men ... in handsome uniform" the rurales were reconstituted in 1869 as part of the reconstruction of the Mexican Republic following the Franco/Maximilian episode. The corps was placed under the Ministro de Gobernación and specifically tasked with providing mounted patrols for rail and road links, escorting gold and other valuable shipments, providing support for the Federal Army when called upon, and ensuring security when local elections were held.

A detachment of Rurales in field uniform during the Diaz era

By 1875 the corps numbered about one thousand members, organized in forty-two squads primarily responsible for patrolling the Mexico valley region. While their performance was uneven - with charges being made of both aggressive behavior against the public and slackness in enforcing their responsibilities - the rural guards had been successful in eliminating a number of bandit groups.

Following his accession to power in 1877, President Porfirio Díaz expanded the Rurales to nearly 2,000 by 1889 as part of his programme of modernization and (eventually) repression. Initially some captured guerrilleros were forcibly inducted into the Rurales, as had been the case under Juárez. The system of recruitment however subsequently became a more conventional one of volunteer enlistment. Officers were either seconded from the Federal Army or promoted through the Rurale ranks. The Rurales were heavily armed; carrying cavalry sabers, Remington carbines, lassos and pistols. They were divided into ten corps, each comprising three companies of about 76 men each.

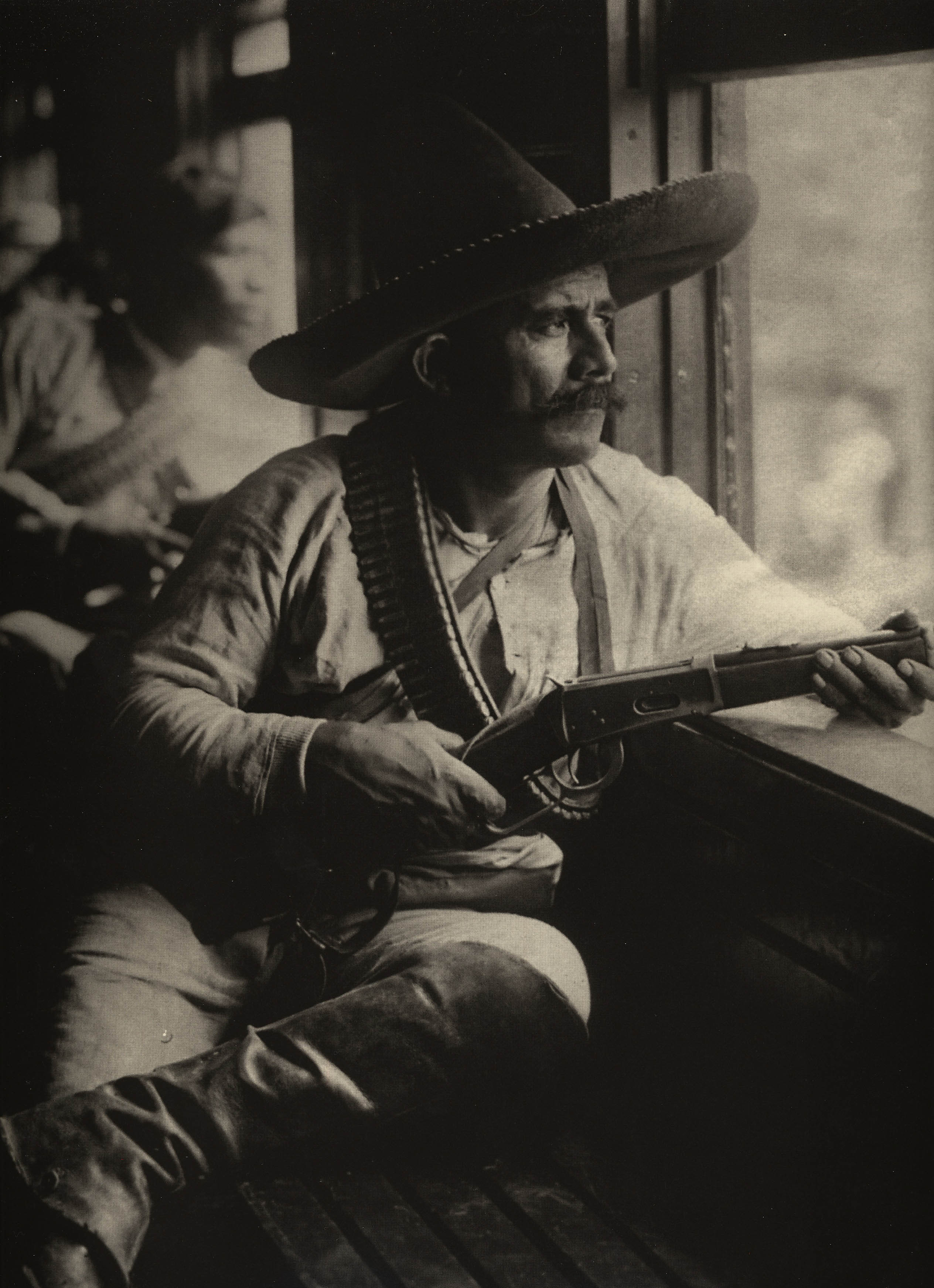
Rural Guard on board a train. Photograph by Manuel Ramos, published in La Revista de Revistas May 1912

The Porfirian regime deliberately fostered the image of the Rurales as a ruthless and efficient organization which – under the notorious ley fuga ("law of flight") – seldom took prisoners and which inevitably got its man. However research by Professor Paul J. Vanderwood, during the 1970s involving detailed examination of the records of the corps, indicated that the Rurales were neither as effective nor as brutal as regime publicists had suggested. The daily pay of 1.30 pesos was not high and up to 25% of recruits deserted before completing their four-year enlistments. This term of service was extended to five years after 1890. Only one rurale in ten re-enlisted after completing his first term; a low proportion that may have been influenced by slow and limited promotion.

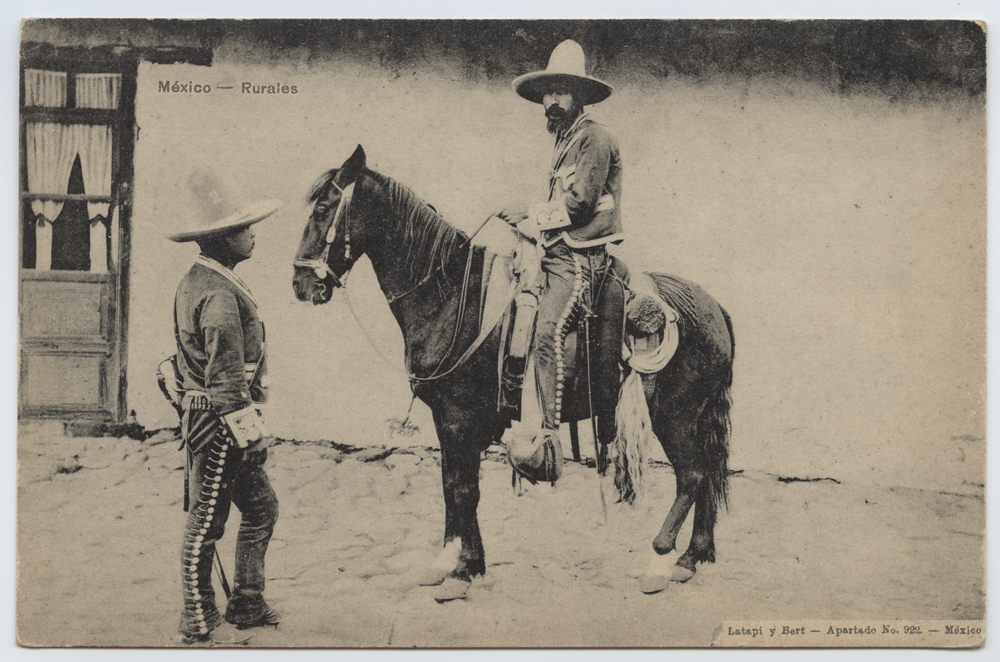
Public image of the rurales in charro style dress c1890. Photo Abel Briquet

Never numbering more than about 4,000 men and located in small detachments, the Rurales were too thinly spread to ever eliminate unrest in the Mexican countryside. They did however impose a superficial order, especially in the central regions around Mexico City, which encouraged the foreign investment sought by Díaz and his científico advisers. To a certain extent the regime saw the Rurales as a counterweight to the much larger Federal army and in the later years of the regime they were increasingly used to control industrial unrest, in addition to the traditional task of patrolling country areas. While in theory a centralized organisation, the rural guards often came under the direct control of local politicians (Jefes) or landowners.

The Rurales achieved a high profile internationally, rather like that of the Royal Canadian Mounted Police or the Texas Rangers, whose roles they paralleled. They wore a distinctive dove grey uniform braided in silver, which was modelled on the national charro dress and included wide felt sombreros, bolero jackets, tight fitting trousers with silver buttons down the seams, and red or black neckties. Senior officers wore elaborate rank insignia in the form of Austrian knots and sombrero braiding, which cost hundreds of pesos. The corps number appeared in silver on both the headdress and a leather carbine cross-belt. Protective leather chaps and canvas fatigue clothing were often worn as field service dress.

The grey and silver dress, the frequent involvement of Rurales in ceremonial parades and their general reputation, drew the attention of foreign visitors to Mexico during the Porfiriato. They were variously described as "the world's most picturesque policemen" and "mostly bandits". The former may have been true but the latter was a distorted memory of the rough-and-ready early days of the corps. Some of the Mexican states maintained their own rural mounted police forces and a separate city police force operated in Mexico City, but none matched the Federal Rurales in notoriety or glamour.

=== Under Francisco Madero and Victoriano Huerta ===
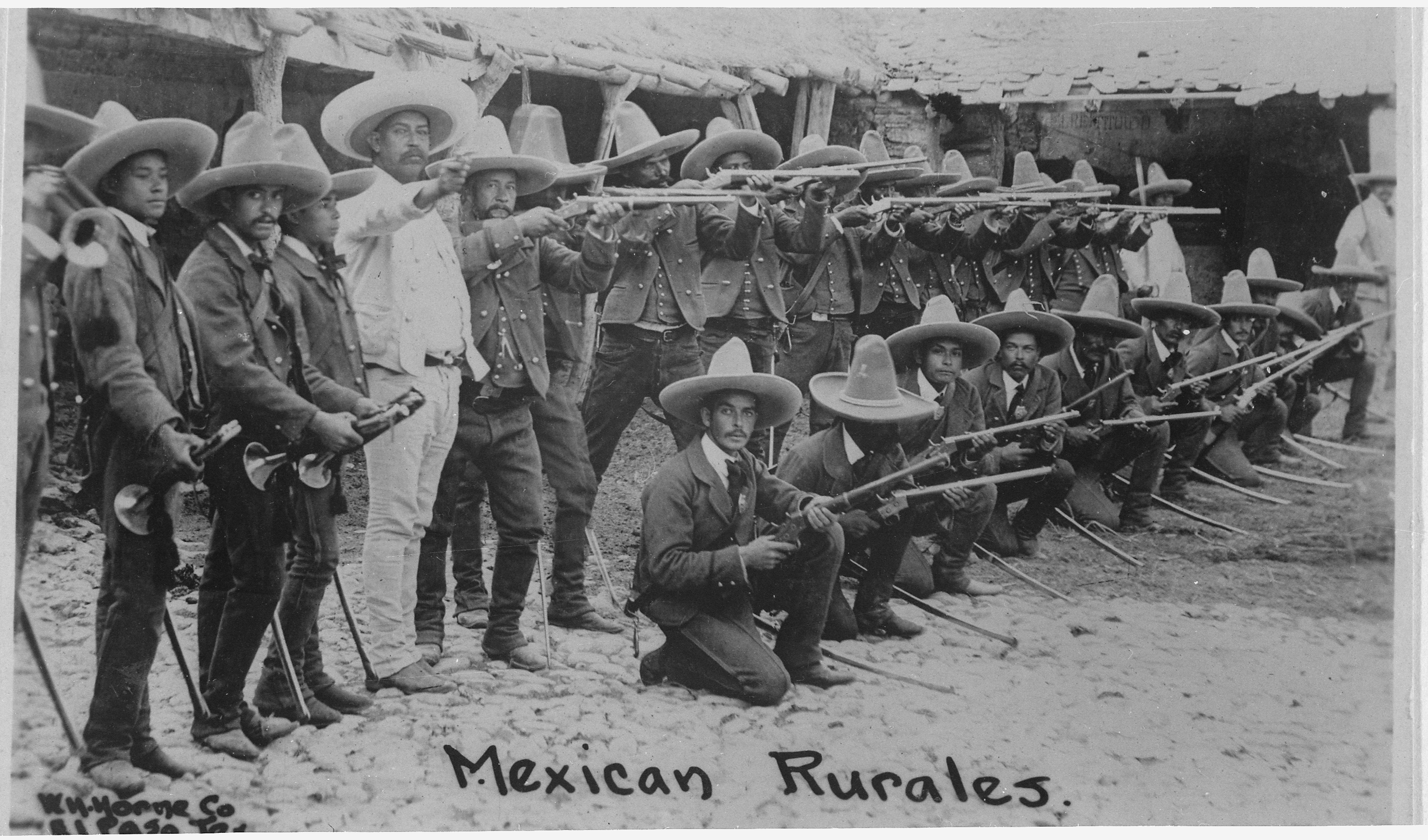
Mexican Rurales before disbandment in 1914. Officers in white and buglers at left.

During the early stages of the Mexican Revolution of 1910, detachments of Rurales served alongside Federal troops against the rebel forces. While retaining an elite image (one revolutionary fighter commented to an American writer that Rurales never surrendered "because they are police", and a report to the U.S. Army rated them as individually superior to any of Pancho Villa's irregulars), the force was too weak in numbers and dispersed in deployment to play a decisive role.

After the overthrow of Díaz in 1911, the Rurales continued in existence under Presidents Francisco I. Madero (1911–1913) and Victoriano Huerta (1913–1914). Madero left the force essentially unchanged, although introducing legislation intended to prevent corpsmen, other than senior officers, from carrying out summary executions without due trial process. In practice the induction of large numbers of Maderista fighters on a temporary basis while awaiting discharge simply diluted such efficiency as the corps had retained. Huerta saw a more central role for the Rurales and directed officers of the Corps to murder Madero after the "Ten Tragic Days" of 1913. During the fighting that marked this internecine conflict, part of the rurales remained loyal to the Madero government. Three hundred rural guardsmen of the 18th Corps were ambushed by rebel machine gunners in the centre of Mexico City, losing 67 dead and wounded. It is uncertain whether the destruction of the 18th Corps was the result of a tactical blunder or a measure deliberately arranged by General Huerta to weaken the Madero forces.

Huerta then proposed to expand the existing Rurale units into a field force of over ten thousand men serving alongside the regular Federal troops. Recruiting problems and desertions prevented this ever becoming a realistic project. The remains of the Guardia Rural were finally disarmed and disbanded during July–August 1914, along with the old Federal Army, when Huerta fled into exile.

=== The Rurales in fiction ===
- The Rurales of the Diaz era make an appearance in O. Henry's short story, "Hostages to Momus". O. Henry, writing through the first-person narration of the character Tecumseh Pickens, gives a colorful sketch of the Rurales:

"Rurales? They're a sort of country police; but don't draw any mental crayon portraits of the worthy constable with a tin star and a gray goatee. The rurales—well, if we'd mount our Supreme Court on broncos, arm 'em with Winchesters, and start 'em out after John Doe et al. we'd have about the same thing."

- In his novels "The General From the Jungle" and "Rebellion of the Hanged", the German/Mexican writer B. Traven describes in detail the role of the Rurales during the early years of the 20th century; as an instrument of repression against the exploited peasantry and mahogany cutters of the far south of Mexico.
- In his film Viva Zapata, John Steinbeck portrays the Rurales as guarding a hacienda, escorting a prisoner, breaking up a riot in a village square, and suppressing rural unrest.
- Early in One-Eyed Jacks, a Western film set in the 1880s, American bank robbers played by Marlon Brando and Karl Malden are pursued by Rurales.
- The Rurales appear as the primary law enforcement in the fictional state of Nuevo Paraiso in Red Dead Redemption, with both uniformed and plainclothes officers. The game inaccurately refers to them as "Federales" to distinguish them from the Mexican Army. They will pursue the player if they commit crimes in Mexico and offer side jobs hunting bandits or performing night watch duties for cash.
- In Gordon Rottman's 2014 novel, The Hardest Ride, Rurales are engaged in a battle with Texans pursuing a band of kidnapping banditos into northern Mexico.
- In the film The Magnificent Seven, Chris Adams, played by Yul Brynner, initially suggests to the village leaders that they should request help from the Rurales to fight off bandits plaguing their village

== Cuban Guardia Rural ==
Cuba also maintained the Cuban Rural Guard (Spanish: Guardia Rural Cubana) from 1898 until the revolution of 1959. A militarized and mounted constabulary, it performed the same rural policing functions as its Mexican and Spanish counterparts.

== See also ==
- History of Mexico § Porfiriato (1876–1910)
