= Arellano Félix =

The Arellano Félix is a surname that may pertain to several individuals involved with the Tijuana Cartel (also known as the Arellano Félix Organization).

- Benjamín Arellano Félix (born 1952), Mexican drug lord died
- Carlos Arellano Félix (born 1955), surgeon by training, Mexican drug lord
- Eduardo Arellano Félix (born 1956), Mexican drug lord, now imprisoned
- Enedina Arellano Félix (born 1961), Mexican drug lord, fugitive
- Francisco Javier Arellano Félix (born 1969), Mexican drug lord, now imprisoned
- Francisco Rafael Arellano Félix (1949–2013), Mexican drug lord
- Ramón Arellano Félix (1964–2002), Mexican drug lord
