= Miguel Ángel Félix Gallardo =

Mexican drug lord (1946–2026)

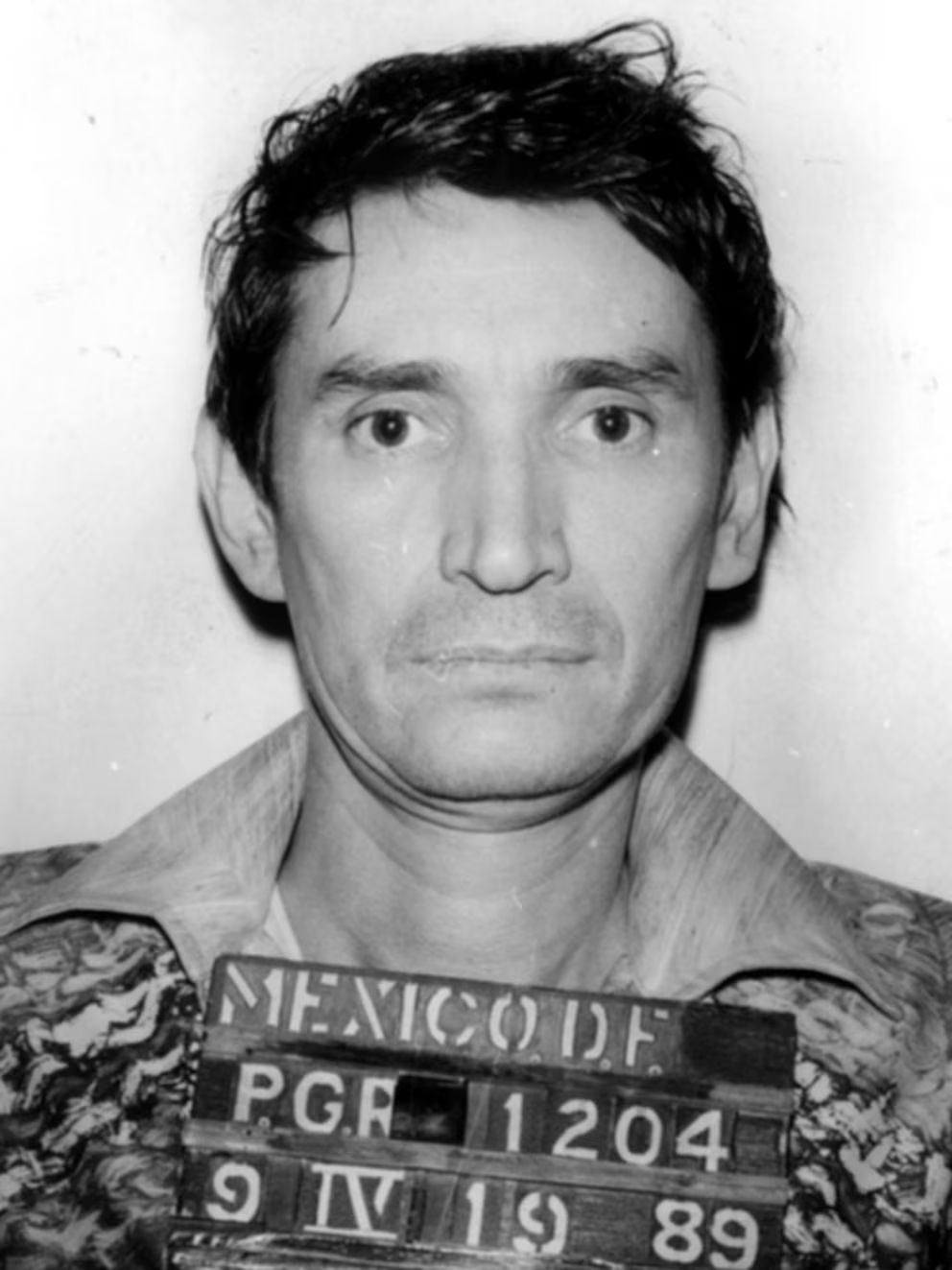
- Mugshot of Félix Gallardo in 1989
- Born: January 8, 1946; Culiacán, Sinaloa, Mexico
- Died: November 15, 2026 (aged 80); Guadalajara, Jalisco, Mexico
- Other names: El Jefe de Jefes (The boss of bosses); El Padrino
- Occupation: Drug lord
- Status: Deceased
- Convictions: Drug trafficking, 1st degree murder
- Penalty: 40-year sentence

Miguel Ángel Félix Gallardo (January 8, 1946 – November 15, 2026), known as "El jefe de jefes" (lit. 'The boss of bosses'), was a Mexican drug lord who was convicted as one of the founders of the Guadalajara Cartel, which controlled much of the drug trafficking in Mexico and the corridors along the Mexico–United States border in the 1980s. The Guadalajara Cartel was regarded as the country's first major drug cartel. He was also seen as an instrumental figure in the founding of the Tijuana Cartel and the Sinaloa Cartel, the latter of which is seen as Mexico's most dominant drug cartel in the 2020s.

Félix Gallardo was arrested in 1989 on charges of ordering the murder of U.S. Drug Enforcement Administration (DEA) agent Enrique "Kiki" Camarena. He was serving his 40-year sentence at the Altiplano maximum-security prison but, due to his declining health, was transferred in 2014 to a medium-security facility where he stayed until his death in 2026.

Félix Gallardo was regarded as "one of the godfathers of Mexico's drug trafficking industry" and an "architect of Mexico's modern drug trade". He was also instrumental in several international drug trade organizations in Latin and South America. The New York Times described Félix Gallardo as a leading figure of the modern drug war.

== Early life ==
Born on January 8, 1946, on a ranch in Bellavista, on the outskirts of Culiacán, Sinaloa, Félix Gallardo graduated from high school and studied business in college (although The Wall Street Journal reported that he only achieved a second-grade education). He took a job as a Mexican Federal Judicial Police agent when he was 17. He worked as a family bodyguard for Governor of Sinaloa Leopoldo Sánchez Celis, whose political connections helped Félix Gallardo build his drug trafficking organization. He was also the godfather of Sánchez Celis's son, Rodolfo.

== Rise of the Guadalajara Cartel ==
Félix Gallardo began his drug career working with Honduran trafficker Juan Matta-Ballesteros in 1975. In the 1970s, Félix Gallardo moved to Guadalajara in search of new territory due to a Mexican Army campaign in the Sierra Madre Oriental codenamed Operation Condor, which destroyed the country's poppy production. This allowed Pedro Avilés Pérez to rise to power through large-scale cocaine trafficking. Félix Gallardo became involved in his drug networks, and was first indicted for drug trafficking in 1971. He initially smuggled cannabis and opium into the United States, but after Avilés was killed in a police shootout in 1978, he took control of his trafficking routes alongside Rafael Caro Quintero and Ernesto Fonseca Carrillo. He partnered with Caro Quintero and formed the Guadalajara Cartel in 1980, which according to InSight Crime would establish "the roots for nearly all of today's drug trafficking activities" and dominate Mexico's trafficking industry during the cocaine boom.

Between the 1970s and 1980s, Félix Gallardo was able to expand his cartel under the protection of corrupt government officials whom he bribed. He eventually linked with Colombian cartels, especially Pablo Escobar's Medellín Cartel, in the 1980s, which had been searching for alternative trafficking routes in Mexico as US interdiction efforts at sea increased. He organized a land route from South America to the US–Mexico border, which received protection via government connections he formed during his time as a bodyguard for Leopoldo Sánchez Celis. The Guadalajara Cartel played a major role in smuggling drugs into the United States, using tactics such as flying light aircraft. He was the first to smuggle cocaine to the US on a large scale and became Escobar's top associate in Mexico. Sometime that decade, he also met Joaquín "El Chapo" Guzmán and put him in charge of his gang's logistics.

Juan Matta-Ballesteros was the Guadalajara Cartel's primary connection to the Colombian cartels, as he had originally introduced Félix Gallardo's predecessor, Alberto Sicilia Falcón, to Santiago Ocampo of the Cali Cartel, one of the largest Colombian drug cartels. Rather than taking cash payments for their services, the smugglers in the Guadalajara Cartel took a 50% cut of the cocaine they transported from Colombia through Félix Gallardo's route, shaping his influence on the global illegal drug trade. This was also extremely profitable for them, with some estimating that the trafficking network, then operated by Félix Gallardo, Fonseca Carrillo and Caro Quintero, was pulling in approximately US$5 billion annually.

Around the end of the 1980s, the Guadalajara Cartel headed by Félix Gallardo (comprising what is known today as the Sinaloa, Tijuana, Juárez and Pacífico Sur cartels) had nearly monopolized the illegal drug trade in Mexico. At its peak, the gang exerted immense influence on Mexico's political landscape, controlling state governorships and police networks. He also managed to amass a large number of properties, including a mansion, 70 houses, 16 ranches, two hotels, an aircraft, and various luxury vehicles. At the time of his arrest in 1989, the Guadalajara Cartel trafficked around four tons of cocaine each month, according to the Drug Enforcement Administration (DEA).

== Murder of DEA agent Kiki Camarena ==
In 1980, DEA special agent Enrique "Kiki" Camarena was assigned to the Administration's resident agency in Guadalajara, Jalisco. Working through informants, Camarena discovered cartel marijuana plantations in the state of Zacatecas. The plantations were raided and destroyed. In 1984, Mexican soldiers, backed by helicopters, destroyed an even larger 1,000-hectare (2,500-acre) marijuana plantation known as "Rancho Búfalo" in Chihuahua, known to be protected by Mexican DFS intelligence agents, as part of "Operation Godfather". Thousands of farmers worked the fields at Rancho Búfalo, and the annual production was later valued at US$8 billion. All of this took place with the knowledge of local police, politicians, and the military.

Camarena was beginning to expose the connections among drug traffickers, Mexican law enforcement, and high-ranking government officials within the Institutional Revolutionary Party (PRI), which Félix Gallardo considered to be a major threat to the Guadalajara cartel's operations throughout Mexico.

In response, Félix Gallardo reportedly ordered the kidnapping of Camarena. On February 7, 1985, Jalisco police officers on the cartel's payroll kidnapped Camarena as he left the U.S. consulate in Guadalajara. His helicopter pilot, Alfredo Zavala Avelar, was kidnapped shortly afterward. They were taken to a residence located at 881 Lope de Vega in the Jardines del Bosque neighborhood, in the western section of Guadalajara, owned by Rafael Caro Quintero. Camarena and Avelar were tortured and interrogated over a period of 30 hours, after which, on February 9, Camarena was executed. Autopsy results indicated that he died after his skull was perforated with a drill. He was injected with adrenaline and other stimulant drugs so as to be kept awake and to avoid his losing consciousness during his torture and interrogation. His body, wrapped in plastic, was found with that of pilot Alfredo Zavala Avelar, in a shallow hole on a ranch in the state of Michoacán.

The murder prompted one of the largest DEA homicide investigations ever undertaken, Operation Leyenda.

Investigators identified Félix Gallardo and his two close associates, Ernesto Fonseca Carrillo and Rafael Caro Quintero, as the primary suspects behind the kidnapping. Under pressure from the US, Fonseca and Caro Quintero were apprehended, but Félix Gallardo still enjoyed political protection.

== Arrest ==
Félix Gallardo kept a low profile, spending time outside Guadalajara, including in Geneva, Switzerland. In March 1987, he returned with his family, although they lived in separate homes. In 1989, Javier Coello Trejo, who was appointed deputy attorney general for Mexico's anti-narcotics unit, organized a team of three men to locate him. Using wiretapped phones, which had been set up in every prison in the country, they located Félix Gallardo after he called his secretary to have seafood delivered to his mansion after partying. The unit was then stationed in a nearby residence, before arresting him on April 8, 1989, stuffing a cloth in his mouth to prevent him from attempting suicide. He was flown to Mexico City and questioned by the office of the Attorney General of Mexico, where he offered a bribe of up to US$20 million for his release. He was charged by the authorities in Mexico and the United States with Camarena's kidnapping and murder, as well as racketeering, drug smuggling, and multiple violent crimes.

According to US officials, Félix Gallardo also spent time as a guest at the home of Sinaloa governor Antonio Toledo Corro, allegations that the governor denied. When asked about his association with Félix Gallardo, Governor Toledo said he was "unaware of any outstanding arrest warrants" against Félix Gallardo.

Hours after the arrest, Guadalajara's entire police force of 300 men was summoned by the army for questioning, with as many as 90 officers defecting in the following days. Additionally, up to 18 officers in the Sinaloa State Judicial Police defected, while Sinaloa's Public Security Director was fired and two police chiefs were jailed.

== Incarceration ==
Félix Gallardo was initially sentenced to 40 years of prison. After serving 28 years, a 2017 trial sentenced him to an additional 37 years. While incarcerated, Félix Gallardo remained one of Mexico's major traffickers, maintaining his organization via mobile phone.

After his arrest, Félix Gallardo decided to divide up the trade he controlled as it would be more efficient and less likely to be brought down by law enforcement. Félix Gallardo instructed his lawyer to convene the nation's top drug narcos in 1989 at a house in the resort of Acapulco where he designated the plazas or territories. The Tijuana route would go to his nephews, the Arellano Félix brothers. The Ciudad Juárez route would go to the Carrillo Fuentes family. Miguel Caro Quintero would run the Sonora corridor. Joaquín Guzmán Loera and Héctor Luis Palma Salazar were left the Pacific coast operations, with Ismael Zambada García joining them soon after and thus forming the Sinaloa Cartel, which was not a party to the 1989 pact. Disputes and conflict arose among the Guadalajara Cartel's descendants, which would eventually lead to the Mexican drug war.

When Félix Gallardo was transferred to a high-security prison in 1993, he lost any remaining control over the other drug lords.

As he aged, Félix Gallardo complained that he lived in poor conditions while in jail. He said that he had vertigo, deafness, loss of an eye, and blood circulation problems. He lived in a 240 cm × 440 cm (8 ft × 14 1/2 ft) cell which he was not allowed to leave, even to use the recreational area. In March 2013, Félix Gallardo started a legal process to continue his prison sentence at home when he reached his 70th birthday (January 8, 2016). On April 29, 2014, a federal court denied Félix Gallardo's petition to be transferred from the maximum-security prison to a medium-security one. On December 18, 2014, federal authorities approved his request to transfer to a medium-security prison in Guadalajara, due to his declining health. However, on February 20, 2019, a court in Mexico City denied his request to complete the remainder of his sentence under house arrest. The court stated that Félix Gallardo's defense did not provide them with sufficient evidence to prove that his health issues were putting his life at risk.

On September 12, 2022, it was reported that Félix Gallardo had been granted house arrest and would be moved on September 13, 2022. President Andrés Manuel López Obrador released a statement about his transfer. "I do not want anyone to suffer. I do not want anyone to be in jail." Félix Gallardo ultimately was not transferred due to issues with his ankle monitor.

=== Death ===
On November 13, 2026, Félix Gallardo was evacuated from Puente Grande prison to the Country 2000 private hospital in Guadalajara, after the prison reported that he was experiencing low oxygen levels. He died from respiratory failure and pneumonia complicated by multiple organ failure at 2:00 p.m. CST on November 15, at the age of 80. His body was removed at around 5:00 p.m., and was picked up by two cars from the Gayosso funeral home, before being repatriated to his family.

== Memoirs ==
In 2008, the investigative journalist Diego Enrique Osorno was able to contact Félix Gallardo through the latter's 13-year-old son. Félix Gallardo secretly wrote about his life and passed the hand-written notes to Osorno. The memoirs include narrative about his arrest and presentation before police, and explains a bit of his family tree, jumping from one topic to another. Selections of the 35 pages were published in the Mexican magazine Gatopardo, with background by the journalist.

== Family ==
Following Miguel Ángel Félix Gallardo's arrest, at least nine of his nieces and nephews took over different roles within the organization, thus forming the Arellano Félix Organization, also known as the Tijuana Cartel. The cartel, once was described as "one of the biggest and most violent criminal groups in Mexico".

Members of the Arellano Félix Organization (Tijuana Cartel)

- Alicia Arellano Félix is his niece.
- Benjamín Arellano Félix (incarcerated), a member and former leader of the Arellano Félix Organization, is his nephew.
- Carlos Arellano Félix is his nephew.
- Eduardo Arellano Félix (incarcerated) is his nephew.
- Enedina Arellano Félix de Toledo, leader of the Arellano Félix Organization, is his niece.
- Fabian Arellano Corona is his grandnephew.
- Francisco Javier Arellano Félix (incarcerated) is his nephew.
- Francisco Rafael Arellano Félix (deceased) was his nephew.
- Javier Benjamin Briseño Arellano is his grandnephew. Also went by the name: Javier Gallardo and his son Javier R. Gallardo is estranged and unknown.
- Luis Fernando Arellano Félix is his nephew.
- Luis Fernando Sánchez Arellano (incarcerated) is his grandnephew.
- Ramón Arellano Félix (deceased), a member and former leader of the Arellano Félix Organization, was his nephew.

Sinaloa Cartel

- Sandra Ávila Beltrán, a former member of the Sinaloa Cartel, is his niece.

== Legacy ==
At the time of his arrest in 1989, Félix Gallardo was described by Mexican officials as the "No. 1 narcotics trafficker" in the country. Through his creation of the Guadalajara Cartel, he was attributed to creating Mexico's first major drug cartel.

Following his death, the Los Angeles Times regarded Félix Gallardo as "one of the godfathers of Mexico’s drug trafficking industry" while also noting his role in the creation of other high-profile drug trafficking organizations in the country such as the Sinaloa cartel. USA Today called him an "architect of Mexico's modern drug trade". In their obituary of Félix Gallardo, the BBC called him "one of the biggest drug smugglers in history" and credited him with building an alliance between criminal groups in Colombia and Mexico. The BBC also regarded him as a "revolutionary" figure in drug trafficking while also noting the influence he had on Mexican politics and law enforcement during his time as leader of the Guadalajara cartel.

The New York Times said that Félix Gallardo helped "build the foundations" of the modern drug trade. The Wall Street Journal noted his impact in Latin America by calling him the region's "most powerful drug traffickers" and a pioneer of the global cocaine trade. CNN noted that he "laid the foundations" for large-scale drug trafficking in Mexico and helped "transform" cocaine routes to the United States.

== In popular culture ==
- In second season of the Colombian TV series El cartel, Félix Gallardo is portrayed by the Mexican actor Guillermo Quintanilla as the character of 'El Golfo'.
- In the TV series Alias El Mexicano, he is portrayed by the Mexican actor Rodrigo Oviedo.
- In the Netflix series Narcos: Mexico, Félix Gallardo is portrayed by Mexican actor Diego Luna.
- A character based on Gallardo is featured briefly in the 2017 television series El Chapo.

== See also ==
- War on drugs
