= Carlos Arellano Félix =

Mexican medical doctor (born 1955)

Carlos Alberto Arellano Félix
- Born: August 20, 1955 (age 71); Culiacán, Sinaloa, Mexico
- Education: Graduated from the Universidad Autónoma de Guadalajara
- Occupations: Surgeon by training. Suspicions that he organises the importation of narcotics into the United States for the Tijuana Cartel
- Parent: Father: Robert Carlos Arellano Mother: Emelia Carlos Arellano
- Status: Not wanted by United States law enforcement

Carlos Alberto Arellano Félix (born August 20, 1955) is a Mexican medical doctor who is known for his illegal involvement in money laundering for the Tijuana Cartel. Carlos was born on the 20th of August in the year 1955 in the city of Culiacán, Sinaloa. Historian Paul Eiss states that Culiacán is the origin of modern drug trafficking and the home of Mexico's most powerful drug cartel. Carlos is currently working as a licensed surgeon. He finished his surgical training at the Universidad Autónoma de Guadalajara The Tijuana Cartel is an organisation that is notorious for being one of the most well-known drug trafficking groups in Mexico to smuggle goods into the United States. Carlos’ family is made up of seven brothers and four sisters who inherited the Arellano Felix Organisation from their godfather, Miguel Ángel Félix. Despite Carlos’ involvement in money laundering for the Tijuana Cartel, he is one of two brothers who remains free and is not wanted by the United States law enforcement.

== Early life ==
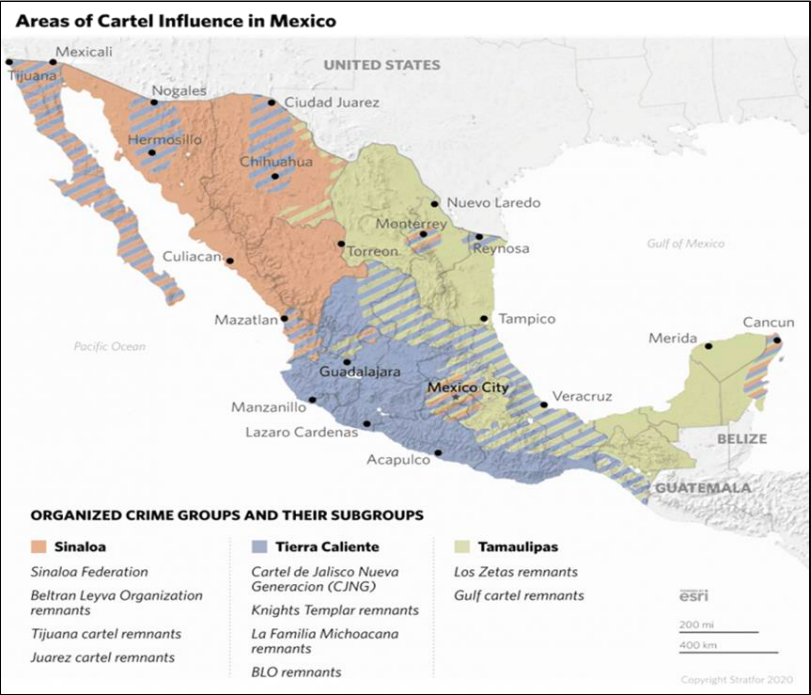
The map indicates region of influence and origin of Mexico's TCOs, DTOs, or cartels.

Carlos Arellano Félix was born in the city of Culiacán, Sinaloa in Mexico. The city is approximately 58,000 square kilometres situated in north-western Mexico between the towering mountains of the Sierra Madre Occidental and the Gulf of California, south of the border of Sonora and north of the beaches of Nayarit Culiacán is situated on a small coastal plain with remote mountain redoubts, secluded tidal marshes and coastal inlands that allow suitable hideouts for rebels, contrabandists and bandits. The Tijuana drug cartel, in which Carlos was involved in, was originally formed in the 1960s in Sinaloa predominantly delivering heroin and marijuana from Sinaloa to the United States. According to Historian Paul Eiss, Culiacán, Sinaloa is a "regional organised crime hub" within Mexico and is the home of one of the most powerful drug cartels Authorities and academics fault the Tijuana's drug trade for the new wave of violence within Mexico. Sinaloa and Culiacán in particular are commonly associated with the values and the aesthetics of drug dealers.

== Family ==
Carlos Arellano Félix's family is composed of seven brothers and four sisters who were brought up in the city of Culiacán. Many of Carlos’ immediate and external family members were also involved in illegal activity through the Arellano Felix Organisation. Carlos’ family all inherited the Arellano Felix Organisation from their god father Miguel Ángel Félix after his incarceration in 1989. Carlos' brothers Eduardo, Ramon, Benjamin and Francisco Javier were the top leaders of the cartel, which dominated the flow of cocaine, marijuana and other drugs between 1986 and 2002. Carlos’ sisters, Enedina and Alicia, are also involved in the organisation's illegal activities. Carlos' nephews, Fabian Arellano Corona and Javier Benjamin Briseño Arellano are also a part of the Tijuana Cartel. Due to Carlos’ family's illegal acts, Mexican prosecutors were pursuing superior Mexican traffickers, including the Arellano family and close associates. Despite Carlos’ active role in money laundering for his family's organisation and an attempted indictment, Carlos and his brother Luis Fernando Arellano Félix are the only brothers who remain free in Mexico and are not wanted for any criminal charges.

=== Eduardo Arellano Félix ===
Eduardo Arellano Félix was Carlos' most ruthless brother who was the chief financial officer of the Tijuana Cartel. He was responsible for laundering hundreds of millions of dollars in illicit drug proceeds alongside Carlos. His role included guiding his brothers to orchestrate the importation of hundreds of tons of cocaine and marijuana into the United States. He ordered several kidnappings and murders and directed the extensive corruption of law enforcement and military personnel in Mexico. Eduardo also personally purchased numerous firearms which were used within the Tijuana Cartel. In October 2008, Eduardo was arrested by Mexican authorities in Tijuana after a shootout with police. His final extradition order was given in 2010.

=== Benjamin Arellano Félix ===
Benjamín Arellano Félix is known to be Carlos' smartest brother who was the prudent and symbolic leader of the Tijuana cartel. He was considered to be the 'brains' of the organisation and participated in drug trafficking, money laundering and aiding and abetting crimes of violence for the Tijuana Cartel. In 2002, Benjamin was detained in Mexico and was extradited to the United States in 2011. In April, he was sentenced to 25 years in prison by a federal court in San Diego after reaching a plea bargain with prosecutors. Despite his arrest, Benjamin continues to have a major influence on the Tijuana Cartel's operations.

=== Ramón Arellano Félix ===
Ramón Arellano Félix is one of Carlos' brothers who was known to be a high-ranking ruthless member of the Tijuana cartel whose role was to lead and implement enforcements within the cartel. He was a drug smuggler who began trafficking contraband electronics, imported clothing and marijuana in Tijuana, working under his brother Benjamín Arellano Félix. While working with the Guadalajara cartel, he developed an ongoing rivalry with Joaquín Guzmán, which was a significant factor that led to the violent conflict between the Tijuana cartel and the Guzmán's cartel. In 2002, Ramon was executed by police in a shootout in the western state of Sinaloa.

=== Francisco Javier Arellano Félix ===
Carlos' youngest brother Francisco Javier Arellano Félix also played a role in the Tijuana Cartel known for laundering money within the organisation. After the arrest of Carlos' brother Benjamín and the death of his other brother Ramón, Francisco became the natural successor to head the organisation. He was in charge of daily operations since 2000, however, was captured by the Coast Guard in August 2006. In November 2007, he was sentenced to life in prison after pleading guilty in September 2007.

=== Francisco Rafael Arellano Félix ===
Carlos' oldest brother Francisco Rafael Arellano Félix was also an active member of the Tijuana Cartel. In 1980, Francisco was arrested in San Diego after supplying cocaine to a DEA agent. Francisco then fled after posting bail and was then captured in Tijuana in 1993. He spent 15 years in United States prisons and was later released in March 2008. Analysts believed that he continued to actively play a role in the cartels organisation when returning to Mexico.

=== Luis Fernando Arellano Félix ===
There is little information available on Carlos' seventh brother, Luis Fernando Arellano Félix. However, he is known to have been involved in family owned businesses and there are suspicions that he participated in money laundering. He remains unwanted by United States law enforcement.

=== Enedina Arellano Felix and Alicia Arellano Félix ===
Carlos' sisters Enedina Arellano Felix and Alicia Arellano Félix currently lead the Tijuana Cartel. Before leading the Tijuana Cartel, they handled much of the organisation's financial operations and money laundering.

== The Tijuana Cartel ==
The drug trafficking organisation that Carlos is predominantly known for is the Tijuana Cartel. Carlos and many of his immediate and external family members were involved in illegal activity through the organisation. The Arellano's who were involved in the organisation were described as 'reasonable business men' by some individuals who trafficked through their territory. However, their use of random violence in exposed settings was problematic and engendered many enemies The former head of Organised Crime Unit of the Mexican Federal Attorney General's Office, states that the organisation was one of the first main Mexican drug trafficking organisation to drastically increase its kidnapping prior to President Calderon's offensive against the cartels. The cartel terrorised the Southwest border and beyond with executions, torture, beheadings, kidnappings, and bribes to law enforcement, military personnel, and government officials According to court documents, the organisation made hundreds of millions of dollars by moving hundreds of tons of cocaine and marijuana from Mexico and Colombia into the United States. Carlos' active role within the cartel was to carry out money laundering operations. Carlos did this through several companies situated within Mazatlán, Guadalajara and Mexico City. These companies consisted of real estate, construction, night clubs, money exchange houses and retailing shops. The organisation's business strategy concentrated on drug trafficking and implemented risk-mitigation strategies such as recruiting attractive, affluent youths with dual citizenships to limit inspection when crossing the border. Carlos' brothers Ramón and Benjamín would recruit them into trafficking and enforcing for the organisation in the most upscale night clubs.

=== History ===
The Tijuana Cartel was originally known as the Arellano Felix Organisation It was originally formed in the 1960s in Sinaloa predominantly delivering heroin and marijuana from Sinaloa to the United States. In the 1980s, the organisation was led by Carlos' godfather, Miguel Ángel Félix Gallardo. Miguel's arrest marked the end of the Pax Padrino period and the beginning of the “territorialising” period of the organisation. After Miguel's arrest in 1989, the organisation was passed down to Carlos and his family members. Carlos' brother Benjamín Arellano-Felix took leadership of the Arellano-Felix organisation. Soon after, conflict began between Chapo Guzmán and the Arellano Felix Organisation, with killings between the two occurring in 1991. They attempted to reconcile their conflict in November 1992, however, Chapo struck an attack the following day. In 1993 the Arellano Felix Organisation recruited hit men who assassinated Cardinal Juan Jesús Posadas Ocampo when attempting to kill Chapo causing a significant crisis for the Arellano's. As a response, they began bribing high-level Mexican government officials to minimise the government response which starved their profits. This led to their involvement in kidnapping to increase profits. From 1993 to 1995 Carlos' brothers Benjamín and Ramón were lying low outside Tijuana and the organisation was left to Ismael Higuera Guerrero. The 2000s, represented the beginning of the success of US–Mexican law enforcement decapitation strategies following the arrests of the cartel's significant leaders, El Chuy and El Mayel. Despite Carlos' brother Ramon's death and his brother Benjamin's arrest in 2002, the organisation stayed resilient. However, the arrest of chief, Javier Arellano Félix in August 2006 led the cartel to fall greatly. Between 2006 and 2008, El Ingeniero, the son of Norma Isabel Arellano, symbolised a new generation of leadership for the organisation and a fundamental restructuring of the drug network.

=== The Tijuana Cartel Today ===
Excluding Carlos, the Tijuana Cartel has lost almost all of its first-generation, superior leadership members to either death or arrest. Since its peak during the 1990s and early 2000s, the Tijuana Cartel has weakened significantly. The arrests and deaths of Carlos’ family members and constant attacks and conflicts negatively affected the organisation. However, in spite of recent contradictory statements by United States authorities, the organisation currently remains active and alive in Tijuana thought to be powerful enough to charge “piso” or tax for shipping drugs through controlled areas. Currently, the organisation primarily operates on the US-Mexico border, Tijuana in namesake city located on the US-Mexico border which is a desired location for smuggling drugs into Southern California. Presently, Carlos' sisters Enedina Arellano Felix and Alicia Arellano Félix alongside Carlos' nephew Luis Fernando Sánchez Arellano lead the Tijuana Cartel. There have been suspicions that the Cartel is forming a truce with former rival the Sinaloa Cartel. However, new reports suggest that the two cartels may be competing again. Although Carlos is presently known to be a licensed surgeon and is unwanted, there are suspicions that he continues to allegedly organise the importation of narcotics into the United States for the Tijuana Cartel.

== Carlos Arellano’s freedom ==
Between 2000 and 2010, the Tijuana Cartel lost almost all of its first-generation and highest leadership members to either arrest or death. However, there are two Arellano Félix brothers who still remain free; Carlos and his brother Luis Fernando Arellano Félix. Both brothers remain free in Mexico with no criminal charges or indictments and are not wanted by United States law enforcement. Despite Carlos’ alleged involvement in money laundering done through multiple companies in central Mexico for the Tijuana Cartel, he went to the Universidad Autónoma de Guadalajara and is currently working as a licensed surgeon. He had formerly been indicted in the United States with many of his other brothers, however was subsequently released from the 1989 indictment which has led to his current freedom.
