= Enedina Arellano Félix =

Alleged Mexican drug lord (born 1961)

- Born: April 12, 1961 (age 65); Mazatlán, Sinaloa, Mexico
- Other names: La Jefa; La Madrina; La Narcomami
- Occupation: Tijuana Cartel drug lord
- Predecessor: Eduardo Arellano Félix
- Criminal charges: Drug trafficking, money laundering
- Criminal status: Fugitive
- Spouse: Luis Raúl Toledo Carrejo
- Relatives: List: Alicia (Sister); Luis Fernando (Nephew); Benjamín (Brother); Carlos (Brother); Eduardo (Brother); Francisco Javier (Brother); Francisco Rafael (Brother); Ramón (Brother)

Enedina Arellano Félix de Toledo (born April 12, 1961) is a Mexican drug lord who, alongside her brothers, founded the Tijuana Cartel and played a role as a logistical accountant for the criminal organization.

Throughout most of the 1990s, the Tijuana Cartel was headed by her six brothers, while Enedina advised and helped them in money laundering and financial administration. But after the fall of a financial mastermind in the cartel in 2000, Enedina took up the position. She first started working behind the scenes as a money launderer for the Tijuana Cartel but then ended up leading the cartel after the arrest of her brother Eduardo Arellano Félix in 2008.

Since most of her brothers are either incarcerated or deceased, Enedina has managed the financial aspect of the organization, overseen alliances, and taken the lead of the Tijuana Cartel alongside Luis Fernando (before his capture in 2014). Her historical contacts with drug suppliers in Colombia managed to keep the organization afloat.

== Early life ==
Enedina Arellano Félix was born in Mazatlán, Sinaloa, on April 12, 1961, in a family of drug traffickers. In 1977, when she was 16, Enedina reportedly harbored a dream of becoming the Mazatlán Carnival Queen but abandoned it after her two brothers, Ramón and Benjamín, were wanted by the United States and the Mexican government. During that time, her older brothers were working for Miguel Ángel Félix Gallardo, who would eventually give them the drug corridor in Tijuana, Baja California.

== Criminal career ==
Enedina enrolled at a private university in Guadalajara, Jalisco, graduating with a bachelor's degree in accounting. By the mid 1980s, Enedina was working with the family business, but was never considered by the authorities as a visible head in the Tijuana Cartel. Nonetheless, after the fall of the former cartel's financial brain, Jesús Labra Avilés, alias El Chuy, in the year 2000, Enedina began to directly manage the money laundering activities of the criminal organization.

=== Family members in the Tijuana Cartel ===
Enedina is the sister of former cartel leaders Benjamín, Carlos, Eduardo, Francisco Javier, Francisco Rafael and Ramón. Luis Fernando Sánchez Arellano captured in 2014, the son of Alicia, Enedina's husband, Luis Raúl Toledo Carrejo, was accused by the United States Department of Treasury in the year 2005 of having links with the Tijuana Cartel. Alicia Arellano Félix, the sister of Enedina, is currently a leader in the Tijuana Cartel.

=== Cartel workings ===
Since the apprehension of Benjamín in 2002, the Mexican government was able to severely undermine the Tijuana Cartel but failed to destroy it. Enedina has been a leader in the organization since 2003. After the arrest of Eduardo in 2008, Enedina finally became the leader of the Tijuana clan along with her nephew.

Enedina has helped contribute a more "business-like vision" instead of the old and violent practices of her brothers, who previously led the Tijuana Cartel before they were arrested or killed. She forged alliances with other criminal organizations, as opposed to her brothers, who often resorted to violence. The Drug Enforcement Administration (DEA) and the Mexican media identify Enedina as the first and one of the few women to lead a criminal organization in the world other than Sandra Avila Beltran in Mexico and Griselda Blanco in Colombia and the USA, activities historically reserved for men.

Enedina has several aliases, including: La Jefa, La Madrina, and La Narcomami. The authorities in the United States and Mexico consider Enedina the "financial brains" of the Tijuana Cartel.

=== Kingpin Act ===
In June 2000, the United States Department of the Treasury sanctioned Enedina under the Foreign Narcotics Kingpin Designation Act.

== In media ==
Enedina Arellano Félix is portrayed in Narcos: Mexico by Mayra Hermosillo.

== See also ==
- Griselda Blanco
- Illegal drug trade
- Mexican drug war
- Women in the Mexican drug war

== Bibliography ==
- Vulliamy, Ed (2010). Amexica: War Along the Borderline. Macmillan Publishers. ISBN 978-0374104412.
- Blancornelas, Jesús (2010). El cártel: Los Arellano Félix: la mafia más poderosa en la historia de América Latina. Random House. ISBN 978-9707809628.
