= Edgardo Leyva Escandón =

Mexican drug trafficker (born 1969)

- Edgardo Leyva Escandón as depicted in the U.S. Department of State Narcotics Rewards Program
- Born: September 17, 1969 (age 56); Tijuana, Baja California, Mexico
- Other name: 24, El 24
- Employer: Tijuana Cartel (suspected)
- Height: 5’ 11"

Notes
- US$2 million reward.

Edgardo Leyva Escandón is a Mexican suspected criminal and high-ranking member of the Tijuana Cartel, a criminal group based in Baja California.

== Bounty ==
Since the August 16, 2006 capture of Javier Arellano Félix, Leyva Escandón has kept a low profile and is still a fugitive from justice. In October 2009 all of his accounts were frozen under the Kingpin Act. The Act further prohibits anyone from conducting financial or commercial transactions with Edgardo Leyva Escandon.

Leyva-Escandon has been indicted in the Southern District of California, United States, for unlawfully possessing large quantities of ammunition. The U.S. Department of State is offering a reward of up to US $2 million for information leading to the arrest and/or conviction of Edgardo Leyva Escandón.

== Kingpin Act sanction ==
On 22 October 2009, the United States Department of the Treasury sanctioned Leyva Escandón under the Foreign Narcotics Kingpin Designation Act (sometimes referred to simply as the "Kingpin Act"), for his involvement in drug trafficking along with five other international criminals and one entity. The act prohibited U.S. citizens and companies from doing any kind of business activity with him, and virtually froze all his assets in the U.S.

== See also ==
- List of fugitives from justice who disappeared
