= Francisco Rafael Arellano Félix =

Mexican drug lord (1949–2013)

- Born: 24 October 1949; Culiacán, Sinaloa, Mexico
- Died: 18 October 2013 (aged 63); Los Cabos, Baja California Sur, Mexico
- Cause of death: Traumatic brain injury (From gunshot wounds)
- Other names: Aliases: Pancho; El Pelón; El Menso; La Pancha; El Escorpión
- Occupation: Former Tijuana Cartel drug lord
- Criminal charges: Illegal arms possession, drug charges and murder

Francisco Rafael Arellano Félix (24 October 1949 – 18 October 2013) was a Mexican drug lord and former leader of the Tijuana Cartel, a drug trafficking organization. He was the oldest of seven brothers and headed the criminal organization early in the 1990s alongside them. Through his brother Benjamín, Francisco Rafael joined the Tijuana Cartel in 1989 following the arrest of Miguel Ángel Félix Gallardo, one of the most prominent drug czars in Mexico during the 1980s. When the Arellano Félix took control of the organization in the early 1990s, tensions with the rival Sinaloa Cartel prompted violent attacks and slayings from both fronts.

The drug lord was arrested in 1993 in Tijuana, Baja California, and imprisoned at Federal Social Readaptation Center No. 1, a maximum security prison. In 2006, he was extradited to the United States pending charges on drug trafficking in a California federal district court. He was released from prison two years later and deported back to Mexico. Back in his home country, Francisco Rafael had no other pending criminal charges. While celebrating his birthday in Los Cabos, Baja California Sur, on 18 October 2013, a gunman disguised as a clown shot him dead.

== Early life ==
Francisco Rafael Arellano Félix was born in Culiacán, Sinaloa, on 24 October 1949, to Benjamín Francisco Arellano Sánchez (father) and Norma Alicia Félix Zazueta (mother). (Note: Other sources state that his mother's name was Alicia Isabel Félix Zazueta.) His father was from the state of Durango but emigrated to Sinaloa, where he met his wife, in the 1940s. The couple had eleven children, Francisco Rafael being the eldest of his seven brothers (Benjamín, Carlos Alberto, Eduardo, Ramón Eduardo, Luis Fernando, Francisco Javier) and four sisters (Alicia María, Enedina, Norma Isabel and Leticia). He also had two half-brothers, Jesús and Manuel Arellano, but their second surnames remain confidential. Francisco Rafael grew up in a modest house in Miguel Hidalgo St. #566 in Culiacán, blocks away from the Autonomous University of Sinaloa, and lived there for about 20 years. Neighbors recall that the Arellano Félix brothers were "cheerful boys" without addictions and inclined to selling clothes, licor, and candy that they brought illegally from the United States. Francisco Rafael went to "Álvaro Obregón" elementary school a couple of streets away from their house. He later attended "Emilio Obeso" middle school in the same neighborhood. At a young age, Francisco Rafael dropped out of middle school to help out his father, a mechanic. Alongside his brothers Benjamín and Ramón, however, he also smuggled contraband from Tijuana. His affinity towards music led him and his two brothers to form a musical group known as "Sonido Escorpión" and later renamed as "Los Escorpiones". By the 1970s, his family moved to Guadalajara, Jalisco, but Francisco Rafael stayed in Culiacán, where he owned an event center known as "El Chaplín". He then moved years later to Mazatlán and opened a discothèque, "Frankie Oh". The discothèque was a major nightlife attraction in Mazatlán during the mid-1980s. With an estimated US$5 million investment to build it, "Frankie Oh" had the capacity to host 2,500 people; it had an internal waterfall and a large dance floor surrounded by a fish tank. The nightclub's theme also mirrored a zoo because it had several exotic animals, including two lions, in the entrances and in the surroundings. The only non-living animal was a giant metal statue of a scorpion which was both a water fountain and the logo of the nightclub. Francisco Rafael usually carried a diamond-encrusted scorpion necklace in reference to his astrological sign, the Scorpio.

The disco hosted several famous Mexican and international artists, including but not limited to Luis Miguel, Emmanuel, Mijares, and Nelson Ned, Ricardo Montaner, among others. It also hosted car and motorcycle shows where Francisco Rafael performed with his Harley-Davidson. With his popularity rising in Mazatlán, he was named "Businessman of the Year" by a local radio station. Aside from managing the disco, Francisco Rafael organized beauty contests, sports tournaments, and made frequent appearances in social magazines. He was a close friend of former World Champion Mexican boxer Julio César Chávez, whom he considered as close as a brother of his. Francisco Rafael lived most of his early life as a businessman and playboy while his brothers, Benjamín and Ramón, became involved in the drug trade after moving to Tijuana in the 1980s. Francisco Rafael was first married to Victoria Barrionuevo and had three children (Francisco, Benjamín Arellano Barrionuevo, and an unnamed daughter); after separating and divorcing, he remarried, to Rocío del Carmen Lizárraga Lizárraga, whom he abducted several months after she was declared Carnival Queen of Mazatlán just after her 18th birthday in May 1990.

== Crimes ==
Francisco Rafael's maternal aunt, Agustina Félix Zazueta, married Jesús Labra Avilés (alias "El Chuy"), a drug trafficker under the tutelage of Miguel Ángel Félix Gallardo, the former leader of the Guadalajara Cartel and a high-profile drug lord in Mexico. Other sources say that the Arellano Félix brothers were nephews of the drug lord Félix Gallardo, who allegedly introduced them to the drug trade in Baja California. Benjamín worked with the drug trafficker Javier Caro Payán (cousin of Rafael Caro Quintero), who later fled to Canada after Félix Gallardo was arrested in 1989 and after he feared a coup from the Arellano Félix.

With the leadership void open, Benjamín started to work full-time with his uncle Labra Avilés; Francisco Rafael, Ramón, and Javier later join them in Tijuana. The arrest of Félix Gallardo led to the disintegration of the Guadalajara Cartel into several drug trafficking organizations: in the western coast, a faction formed the Sinaloa Cartel; in the Ciudad Juárez border area, another group formed the Juárez Cartel; and in the Baja California border region, others formed the so-called Tijuana Cartel, which was formed by the Arellano Félix clan and lieutenants previously loyal to Félix Gallardo in the area. In December 1989, the Arellano Félix ordered their gunmen to decimate the Machi Ramírez, a once-prominent crime family that controlled the drug trade in Tijuana prior to their arrival. Once established in Tijuana, the Arellano Félix clan forged important relations with some of the most prominent families in the region.

The flight, eventual arrest, and murder of Caro Payán angered his associates that headed the Sinaloa and Sonora Cartels. Two leaders of the Sinaloa Cartel, Joaquín "El Chapo" Guzmán, now jailed in the United States, and his business partner Héctor "El Güero" Palma, attempted to take control of Tijuana from the hands of the Arellano Félix in the early 1990s. The antagonism lasted for several years and was accompanied by violent acts in the states of Baja California, Sonora, Sinaloa, Durango, Jalisco, Guerrero, Michoacán and Oaxaca.

In 1989, "El Chapo" Guzmán sent Armando López (alias "El Rayo"), one of his most-trusted men, to speak with the Arellano Félix in Tijuana. Before he had a chance to speak face-to-face with them, López was killed by Ramón. The corpse was disposed in the outskirts of the city and the Tijuana Cartel ordered a hit on the remaining family members of the López family to prevent future reprisals. Two years later, Ramón killed another Sinaloa Cartel associate, Rigoberto Campos Salcido (alias "El Rigo"), prompting ever more intense conflicts with the rival cartel. In September 1992, the Tijuana Cartel ordered another hit against their rivals; in Iguala, Guerrero, lawyers of Félix Gallardo and several of his family members were kidnapped and killed by gunmen. "El Güero" Palma responded to the attacks by ordering several of his men to kill eight members of the Arellano Félix organization at the Christine discothèque in Puerto Vallarta, Jalisco. Ramón and Francisco Javier were the prime targets but they escaped uninjured.

The rivalry reached its apex on 24 May 1993 when gunmen affiliated with the Tijuana Cartel attempted to kill "El Chapo" Guzmán in the Guadalajara International Airport. In the raging fire, gunmen shot a luxurious vehicle thought to hold Guzmán; however, among those aboard was the Roman Catholic Cardinal, Juan Jesús Posadas Ocampo, who was killed at the scene, along with six other civilians. Guzmán successfully escaped the assassination attempt by leaving in a taxi. (Note: The official line of investigation was that Posadas Ocampo was a victim of mistaken identity; however, some theorize that the attack may have been targeted because he knew too much about high-level corruption in the Mexican government.) On 4 December 1993, Francisco Rafael was arrested by the Federal Judicial Police (PJF) in Tijuana for charges on drug trafficking, illegal use of weaponry under Mexican law, and complicity in the murder of Posadas Ocampo. He was sentenced to 10 years and three months and imprisoned at the Federal Social Readaptation Center No. 1, a maximum security prison in Almoloya de Juárez, State of Mexico. Unlike his brothers who eventually led the Tijuana Cartel and made it one of the leading and most violent drug trafficking organizations in Mexico during the 1990s, Francisco Rafael was not a key player in the cartel's hegemony. His arrest in 1993 came before the family's downfall and the arrests and/or deaths of his brothers. In the Tijuana Cartel, his task was to coordinate the buying and selling of narcotics to the United States.

=== Extradition to the U.S. ===
A 1980 US indictment said that Francisco Rafael was under investigation by the DEA for alleged cocaine and heroin distribution in the San Diego area. The DEA had identified him as one of the cocaine suppliers and set up an undercover operation to arrest him and his associates by purchasing multi-ton shipments of cocaine. He admitted to have worked with drug distributor Ramón Torresillos-Rendón, and that he used him as a mediator for a drug transaction with an undercover federal agent. In court, Francisco Rafael admitted having sent Torresillos-Rendón and four other individuals to sell nine ounces of cocaine to the agent. He was arrested in California on 7 August 1980 and remained under custody until or around 8 September 1980 after paying a US$150,000 bond and promising to appear at every court session. Nonetheless, he fled to Mexico shortly afterwards and did not appear in court on 8 October 1980.

On 2 June 2003, United States authorities requested the Mexican government to extradite Francisco Rafael. A Mexican federal judge approved the request the following year but the drug lord was not extradited to the United States until September 16, 2006. He was flown from Matamoros, Tamaulipas, via helicopter and handed over to U.S. authorities in a prison in Brownsville, Texas, after a 10-year sentence in Mexico. He was then transferred to the state of California pending federal charges on drug trafficking. On 18 June 2007, he pleaded guilty to the possession and distribution of cocaine before U.S. District Judge Irma E. Gonzalez in a San Diego federal court. In his testimony, he admitted to selling about 250 grams of cocaine to a supplier who negotiated with an undercover Drug Enforcement Administration (DEA) agent in an unnamed motel in San Diego in 1980. In October 2007, Francisco Rafael was sentenced to six years in prison and with possibility to parole in four months given the time he had already served in prison.

=== Release and deportation ===
Though sentenced to six years in prison, Francisco Rafael was released on 4 March 2008 after serving only a year and five months. His lawyer confirmed he was credited with time served in Mexican jails. Once released, he was deported to Mexico through the Paso del Norte International Bridge ("Santa Fe") international bridge in Ciudad Juárez, Chihuahua, and El Paso, Texas. He had no pending charges in his home country. Mexican authorities watched Francisco Rafael from a distance as he merged through the multitude of people close to the border. It was unknown if his family was notified of his deportation but the authorities allege that shortly after his arrival he took a flight to Tijuana to see his wife and children. (Note: Another source says that his family was waiting for him near the border in Ciudad Juárez and drove him off.) Upon his arrival, he moved to Mazatlán before relocating to Los Cabos, a resort town in the Baja California peninsula. He lived there with his wife in Cumbres del Tezal, an upper-middle-class neighborhood on a hill and with view towards the Arco de Cabo San Lucas. Instead of his actual name, Francisco Rafael went by his pseudonym Mauro Vázquez, and posed as a businessman, avid motorcyclist, and music producer.

== Death ==
Drawing depicting the murder of Francisco Rafael, provided by Tijuana-based magazine Zeta.

Francisco Rafael was celebrating his 64th birthday along with his wife, children, and friends at Ocean House, a beachfront banquet hall owned by Hotel Marbella in Los Cabos, Baja California Sur on 18 October 2013. (Note: Preliminary reports incorrectly stated that he was killed at a children's party. Mexican officials later confirmed that Francisco Rafael was killed at "his own party".) There were about 80 to 100 attendees at the party, including prominent businessmen, politicians, celebrities, and sport figures such as former Mexican footballer Jared Borgetti and professional boxer Omar Chávez. The party also hosted a number of musical groups, including banda La Cabeña, El Mariachi de Los Cabos, and the former leading vocalist of Banda El Recodo. At around 8:00 p.m. that day, a black-colored SUV entered the private property and parked near the entrance of the ballroom. In the front seats of the car, according to eye-witness reports, were two men; in the back seat was a man dressed as a clown, who descended from the vehicle and headed towards the door that led to the kitchen. Once inside the ballroom, the clown identified Francisco Rafael at the center of the room and began to walk towards him. When the clown was about 1 m (3.3 ft) close, he pulled out a pistol from his costume and shot him point-blank in his head and then several times more as he fell to the ground, killing him on the scene. As the former drug lord lay dead near the entrance, the assassin ran through a rear exit while the attendees yelled, fell to the ground, and hid under the tables. Four more shots were heard outside the ballroom shortly after the attack; according to eyewitnesses, the clown had done this to scare off one of Francisco Rafael's sons, who was chasing him. The suspect then fled the crime scene in the black-colored SUV and headed towards the highway. (Note: Other eye-witnesses stated that the assassins fled on a vehicle to drive to the shore and escape in a speed boat.)

The first to arrive at the crime scene were the municipal authorities of Los Cabos, followed by the Mexican Armed Forces and the federal and state police forces. Upon the arrival of the authorities, Francisco Rafael's wife—in between tears—informed them of the former drug lord's identity. (Note: Another report stated that the corpse of Francisco Rafael was identified by one of his sons.) The autopsy revealed that Francisco Rafael died of severe traumatic brain injury from shots in the thorax and head with a FN Five-seven pistol. The murder of Francisco Rafael initially fell under state jurisdiction because he was not wanted by the federal government when he was killed. Therefore, the murder investigation was started by the Baja California Sur authorities and not by the Office of the General Prosecutor (PGR). However, the PGR joined the case after it was requested by the state authorities.

=== Funeral ===
On 19 October 2013, the Baja California Sur state police escorted the corpse of Francisco Rafael and his family members to the port of Pichilingue. The body was then shipped by boat to his home state of Sinaloa. It was initially reported by the media that his corpse was to be cremated in Mazatlán; however, his remains were taken to the city of Los Mochis in the municipality of Ahome for cremation on 20 October 2013.

=== Aftermath and investigation ===
Roughly twenty-four hours after the death of Francisco Rafael, the Mexican federal police arrested Manuel Aguirre Galindo (alias "El Caballo" – "The Horse"), a founder of the Tijuana Cartel and a high-ranking leader and money launderer who had been a fugitive for more than 20 years, in Mexico City. It is unknown who notified the authorities of his whereabouts but they allege that they were either notified by a rival gang or by members of the Arellano Félix clan. Among the hypotheses presented by Zeta, a Tijuana-based magazine known for its investigative reports on the Tijuana Cartel, are as follows: (1) shortly after the murder of Francisco Rafael, the police interrogated his family and several of the party invitees, who may have shared information that led to Aguirre Galindo's arrest, given that the drug lord was allegedly responsible for providing security to Francisco Rafael; (2) the other hypothesis is that Aguirre Galindo's location was tipped by members of the Tijuana Cartel who were mad at him for failing to protect Francisco Rafael.

Screenshot from a video depicting the alleged assassin seconds prior to the murder.

The motives behind the murder case are officially unknown but Mexican authorities believe that given the circumstances and the players involved, the suspected source of fire was organized crime and that the motives possibly stemmed from "unpaid old debts, and old retributions". The authorities are working with two separate lines of investigation: (1) the first line alleges that Francisco Rafael was killed by members of the Beltrán-Leyva Cartel, a drug trafficking organization that fights for the control of the smuggling routes in the Baja California peninsula against the Sinaloa Cartel; (2) the second line alleges that Francisco Rafael was killed by members of the Sinaloa Cartel, specifically on orders of "El Chapo" Guzmán, the cartel's leader. "El Chapo" was nearly captured by the Mexican federal police in Los Cabos in March 2012, after an anonymous call informed the DEA that the drug lord was possibility hiding in three properties. Investigators allege that Francisco Rafael, although he was no longer involved in organized crime, might have tipped the authorities to his whereabouts and incurred "El Chapo's" wrath. They also believe that the attack might have been carried out by a local drug-dealing group in Los Cabos; the main suspect of this allegation is a man named Javier López Rivera or Javier Acosta López (alias "El Javier" and/or "El Javi"), the supposed leader of this crime cell. In this line of investigation, the authorities believe that the drug dealer sent two of his men to pick up the assassin who had arrived from Sinaloa at the Los Cabos International Airport. Two of the three men involved in the murder case, they allege, go by the aliases "Caín" and "El Chapito".

According to the Mexican authorities, the murder plot was possibly carried out with the collaboration of the Tijuana Cartel because no security measures were taken during the party and because the entrances were open to the public (when they are usually closed for private events). The investigation was further complicated by the fact that many of the invitees—fearing for their lives—fled from the scene when Francisco Rafael was killed by the clown. Out of the 80 to 100 attendees, only 20 of them stayed, many of them family members and employees of the banquet hall. When the authorities interrogated those who stayed and asked them whether they had recognized the assassin or any other physical features, none of them were able to give any details. Some stated that they did not even pay attention to the clown when he entered the crime scene, while others stated that they did not even recall exactly what the clown was wearing, remembering only that the assassin was wearing a blue-striped or purple shirt, a multicolored wig, and a red clown nose.

On 7 November 2013, a person who was at the murder scene uploaded a 1:04 minute video on YouTube showing the scene before Francisco Rafael was killed. The video starts with the former vocalist of Banda El Recodo singing "El Señor de las Canas", a song by Vicente Fernández, alongside a mariachi group. As the film progresses, the camera turns to the sides and shows former footballer Jared Borgetti sitting at a table with Rocío del Carmen Lizárraga, wife of Francisco Rafael. Towards the last seconds of the video, a bald-looking man passes through the back of the tables in front of the camera and apparently gives a hand signal to the assassin before walking away. Then, a man dressed as a clown (the presumed assassin) passes through the crowd and heads towards Francisco Rafael. Seconds later, one shot was heard; most of the invitees were not aware of what had happened, and the music continued. Shortly afterwards, four more shots were heard from the rear. Following the second round of shots, the music stopped and the invitees started screaming. The video only captured a few seconds after the last four shots before concluding. The Baja California Sur authorities believe that the bald-looking man that appeared on the video shortly before the clown and apparently gave him a hand signal is involved in the murder plot. Eyewitnesses who sat at a table with the suspect stated that they did not know who he was but that they saw him greet Francisco Rafael during the party. The suspect reportedly made three phone calls during the party and sent several text messages. Investigators believe that the man was possibly communicating with the assassin; the authorities are investigating the text messages and phone calls made that day in the area through the Telcel database. With the surface of the video, the authorities were able to also gather more information about the assassin and the murder. They were able to identify other invitees, including former Cruz Azul footballer Héctor López. The video allowed the authorities to identify the physical characteristics of the assassin, including his skin color, approximate height, and the color of his clothing. The authorities are investigating whether any purchases made in custom or fabric stores in the area might lead them to the murderers.

In January 2014, the PGR stated that the alleged mastermind of the murder was possibly José Rodrigo Aréchiga Gamboa (alias "El Chino Ántrax"), the leader of Los Ántrax, an armed squadron of the Sinaloa Cartel. The agency revealed through several photographs that Francisco Rafael and Aréchiga Gamboa met at the fight promotion event of boxers Omar Chávez and Joachim Alcine in Los Cabos two days prior to the murder. The PGR hypothesized that the murder was possibly stemmed from Francisco Rafael's involvement in money laundering activities and as a message from the Los Ántrax to show that they were in charge of organized crime in Los Cabos. They also believe that Ismael "El Mayo" Zambada, a top leader of the Sinaloa Cartel, might have ordered the attack. The state authorities identified two other possible murderers: Noé Castro (alias "R1"), Aréchiga Gamboa's right-hand man in Los Cabos; and a man known by his alias "R13". They also conducted anthropometry studies to conclude if Aréchiga Gamboa fit the physical descriptions of the man featured in the video.

== In popular culture ==
In Narcos: Mexico, Francisco Rafael Arellano Félix is played by Mexican actor Francisco Barreiro.

== See also ==
- Mexican drug war
- List of Mexicans
