= Gilberto Landeros Briseño =

Mexican military commander

General Gilberto Landeros Briseño
- Military career
- Allegiance: Mexico
- Branch: Mexican Army
- Rank: Brigadier general
- Unit: Second Military Region
- Conflicts: Mexican drug war, Operation Baja California

Brigadier General Gilberto Landeros Briseño is second in command (under General Alfonso Duarte Múgica) of the second military region in Tijuana. He served in the military unit combatting organized crime groups such as the Tijuana Cartel and the Sinaloa Cartel. In 2019 he was approved as Police chief and he works in Hermosilloen 2022 se le asignó el cargo como secretario de seguridad pública del estado de Baja California
