= Operation Baja California =

Mexican anti-drug operation

- Part of Mexican drug war
Date	2 January 2007 – present
Location	Baja California, Baja California Sur, Mexico
Result	Ongoing

Belligerents
Mexico: Mexican Army; Mexican Marines; Baja California; Baja California Sur	Tijuana Cartel	Unknown

Commanders and leaders
(Mexico) Andrés Manuel López Obrador (2018–present); (Mexico) Luis Cresencio Sandoval (2018–present); (Mexico) José Rafael Ojeda Durán (2018–present); (Baja California) Marina del Pilar Ávila Olmeda (2021–present); (Baja California Sur) Víctor Manuel Castro Cosío (2021–present); Former commanders: (Mexico) Felipe Calderón; (Mexico) Enrique Peña Nieto; (Mexico) Guillermo Galván Galván; (Mexico) Salvador Cienfuegos; (Mexico) Mariano Francisco Saynez Mendoza; (Mexico) Vidal Francisco Soberón Sanz; (Baja California) Eugenio Elorduy Walther; (Baja California) José Guadalupe Osuna Millán; (Baja California) Francisco Vega de Lamadrid; (Baja California) Jaime Bonilla Valdez; (Baja California Sur) Narciso Agúndez Montaño; (Baja California Sur) Marcos Covarrubias Villaseñor; (Baja California Sur) Carlos Mendoza Davis	Luis Fernando Sánchez Arellano (POW)	Unknown

Strength
3,000	1,000+	Unknown

Casualties and losses
Unknown	Unknown	Unknown

Operation Tijuana or Operation Baja California (Spanish: Operativo Tijuana or Operación Baja California) of the Government of Mexico is taking place in Tijuana and the surrounding areas of Baja California and Baja California Sur. This operation is part of the Joint Operation Against Drug Trafficking.

== Joint forces ==
The operation was launched on 2 January 2007, with the deployment of 3,296 officers of the Secretaries of Defense, Navy, Public Security and the department of the Attorney General of Mexico. The Secretariat of Defense sent 2,620 soldiers, 21 airplanes, 9 helicopters, 28 ships, 247 tactical vehicles and ten drug-sniffing dogs. The Navy sent a sea patrol, three interceptor patrols, one helicopter, two support vehicles and 162 marines. The Department of Public Security took the tasks of patrolling, intelligence and investigation as well as taking part in executing orders of arrests, searches and seizures. The Attorney General's Office (PGR) took the tasks of elaborating a map of priorities and provide the tools for information exchange in real-time to facilitate detentions. The PGR will also be present in the 48 local prosecution offices to seize property and take down drug-processing labs. In May 2007, the operations were extended to lesser crimes. The Federal Police, formed by the Federal Agency of Investigation, were to provide 510 officers to participate in tactical analysis, crime investigation, regional security and special operations.

== 2007 ==
=== The arrest of The "Cop Killer" ===
On 3 April, The leader of a band of kidnappers Víctor Magno Escobar Luna (a.k.a. "El Matapolicías", "Cop killer") was apprehended, he was thought to have had links with the state police for at least ten years. He is also thought to have been a member of the state police for a few years.

=== General Hospital shootout ===
On 18 April 2007, a band of criminals entered the General Hospital of Tijuana, took hostages and tried to free a mafia boss that was being treated in the hospital. The liberation was unsuccessful, the criminals exchanged fire with the local police and Army units and were later intercepted but not apprehended by the state and federal police. Three people were reported dead after the shooting and five people apprehended later.

=== Other encounters ===
On 27 August, police officers found three headless bodies in a rubbish dump in Tijuana, killed by drug cartels.

=== Disarmament of local police ===
On 29 December, the entire police force in the town of Playas de Rosarito, Baja California, are disarmed from their weapons after suspicion of collaborating with drug cartels.

=== 2007 Results ===
The federal forces took away the weapons of the local police officers giving an official explanation of doing a fingerprint-check on them. During this time crime increased 40% to 50% since police officers were left unarmed. Kidnappings decreased from six to two compared to 2006. Federal police officers have also been caught receiving bribes. Deaths by firearm dropped from only 27 in January 2006 to 23 in January 2007. Local police departments also reported increases of 400% of crime between minors.

In May 2007, after the disappointment of the population, President Felipe Calderón asked the public to be patient and declared that it may not be in his administration when the results of these operations will be seen.

== 2008 ==
On 28 January, army personnel from the Army's 5th special forces battalion and 2nd Motorized Cavalry Regiment succeeded in the arrest of Alfredo Araujo Avila a.k.a. El Popeye in Tijuana. Alfredo Avila is known to be one of the most active assassins from the 1980s to the early 1990s of the Tijuana Cartel in the states of Sinaloa and Baja California.

On 26, 15 April gunmen from the Tijuana Cartel were killed in a gunbattle against rivals.

On 18 May, In the city of Playas de Rosarito, Baja California, the 28th Infantry Battalion received a tip that men were unloading packages from a boat to three vehicles, immediately the army were dispatched to the area. Upon arriving the Air Recon team confirmed the report. Realizing they've been caught the men dispersed the area but were apprehended, 11 suspects were arrested along with 2 tons of marijuana.

=== Eduardo Arellano Félix ===
On 26 October, Federal Police supported by special forces from 5th Special Forces Battalion capture drug lord Eduardo Arellano Félix a.k.a. "The Doctor" after a shootout in Tijuana.

== 2009 ==
On 3 October, the government ordered 300 Marines and Federal Police forces as "immediate response" to Tijuana, BC. the move comes after a serious number of attacks on Municipal Police officers.

== 2010 ==
- 12 January - Federal Police forces captured Tijuana drug lord Teodoro García Simental a.k.a. "El Teo" in his home in La Paz, Baja California Sur. Later on that day he was transported to Mexico City.
- 16 January - Due to concerns of the increase of violence by the capture of El Teo, 1,000 military personnel both army and marines were sent to the most violent areas of Tijuana by the request of Baja California Governor José Guadalupe Osuna Millán.

Note: (From April 16 to 30 State Preventive Police anti - drug operations are listed below)

- 16 April - Mexicali, In the Colonias of Carranza and Naranjos, six people who belong to the Sinaloa Cartel are arrested. 125.8 kilos of cocaine, 17.6 kilos of "ICE", assault rifles, rifle magazines and 25 vehicles were seized.
- 27 April - Tijuana, In The Colonia of Lomas de la Presa four suspects were arrested who were in possession of 112 kilos of marijuana.
- 28 April - Tijuana, In the Colonias of Gas and Anexas, three people who are assumed members of the Tijuana Cartel and who were under the command of Luis Fernando Sánchez Arellano were arrested. 2 assault rifles, 124 rifle magazines, 700 grams of "crystal", and 490 grams of marijuana were seized.
- 29 April - In Mexicali in the Colonia of Alamitos, one known drug trafficker name Jorge Aaron Samanduras Hernandez, 24 years old was arrested in possession of $110,000, 9 pistols, and 297 pistol magazines.
- 30 April - Baja California's State Preventive Police (PEP) arrested 5 individual's that are link to the Sinaloa Cartel, after raiding a tire garage in Mexicali. Close to a ton of marijuana, 1 grenade launcher, 1 M2 Browning machine gun, various machine guns and rifle magazines were also seized during the operation.
- 8 June - Mexican army troops arrested two Arellano Felix cartel members in the municipality of Comondú. Inés Zamudio Beltrán & Obed Güereña Arvizu are assumed to be Tijuana Cartel lieutenants of that municipality. Ines Zamudio Beltran is said to have links to the family of the municipality's Mayor Joel Villegas Ibarra. He was freed a month later.

== 2011 ==
- 7 November - Mexican army troops arrested Juan Francisco Sillas Rocha, Sillas Rochas was considered as the lieutenant of Luis Fernando Sánchez Arellano.

== 2012 ==
- 27 April - Baja California's State Preventive Police (PEP) arrested Octavio Leal Hernandez (El Chapito) a close lieutenant of Luis Fernando Sánchez Arellano.
- 3 July - Mexican army troops arrested Julio Cesar Salas Quiñonez, Salas Quiñonez was considered as the lieutenant of Luis Fernando Sánchez Arellano.

== 2023 ==
On 13 July 2023, a nearly 20 year investigation against dozens of Tijuana Cartel defendants concluded when former cartel hitman Juan Francisco Sillas Rocha pled guilty to three charges, including conspiracy to commit murder, in a U.S. federal court in Fargo, North Dakota.

== See also ==
- La Familia Michoacana
- Gulf Cartel
- Illegal drug trade
- Juárez Cartel
- Mérida Initiative
- Mexican drug war
- Sinaloa Cartel
- Tijuana Cartel
- Los Zetas
