= Landeros =

Landeros is a surname. Notable people with this name include:

- Gerardo Vargas Landeros (born 1962), Mexican businessman
- Gilberto Landeros Briseño, Mexican Army brigadier general
- Nikko Landeros (born 1989), ice hockey player
- Rob Landeros, computer game designer

== See also ==
- Landeros v. Flood, 1976 lawsuit
- Landero surname page
