= Nabor Vargas García =

Mexican drug trafficker (born 1976)

- Born: 12 July 1976 (age 49); Pachuca, Hidalgo, Mexico
- Other names: Z-20; El Débora
- Organization: Los Zetas (2005–2007)
- Criminal status: Imprisoned at Altiplano
- Military career
- Allegiance: Mexico
- Branch: Mexican Army
- Service years: 1995–1999

Nabor Vargas García (born 12 July 1976) is a Mexican suspected drug lord and one of the founders of Los Zetas, a criminal group formed by former soldiers of the Mexican Armed Forces.

He joined the Mexican Army in the summer of 1995, and served at the Presidential Guard assault battalion unit at some point in his military career until he resigned in 1999. After not finding a job, Vargas García was recruited to work as a lieutenant for Los Zetas and the Gulf Cartel, a drug trafficking organization, in 2005. He eventually became one of the leading members in Los Zetas until he was arrested along with a kidnapping ring in 2007.

== Criminal career ==
Nabor Vargas García was born in Pachuca, Hidalgo on 12 July 1976. He joined the Mexican Army on 28 June 1995 but stepped down from active duty four years later on 1 July 1999, registering for the Army reserves. During his tenure in the Army, he had served at the Presidential Guard assault battalion. After being unemployed for at least six years, Vargas García was recruited by Osiel Cárdenas Guillén, the former leader of the drug trafficking organization known as the Gulf Cartel. Vargas García later became one of the leading lieutenants and founders of the cartel's former muscle, Los Zetas. During the late 1990s, several other members of the Mexican military deserted to form part of the Gulf Cartel and Los Zetas, and were given better payments than in the Armed Forces.

While working in Los Zetas, Vargas García commanded a group of Zeta members in the Mexican states of Campeche, Tabasco, and Chiapas. He was a pioneer in smuggling narcotics for Los Zetas through this region of southern Mexico, and was able to create a pathway for illegal goods flowing from Cancún to Matamoros, Tamaulipas in the northeastern part of the country. Vargas García worked for the drug lords Heriberto Lazcano Lazcano and Jorge Eduardo Costilla Sánchez after Cárdenas Guillén was extradited to the United States. He also controlled human trafficking rings of illegal aliens from Central America.

He was also involved in several kidnappings in Campeche, including the abduction of four syndicate leaders of a petroleum company.

In March 2010, the Office of Foreign Assets Control (OFAC) listed several drug traffickers, including Vargas García, on the Foreign Narcotics Kingpin Designation Act (the "Kingpin Act"), which freezes all their assets in the U.S. and prohibits American companies from doing business with them.

=== Arrest ===
The extinct Federal Preventive Police (PFP), the SIEDO agency and Office of the General Prosecutor (PGR), along with Mexican soldiers and the Campeche state police, arrested Vargas García and 20 kidnappers of the Gulf Cartel in Ciudad del Carmen on 18 April 2007.

Vargas García, alias Z-20 and El Débora, is currently imprisoned at the Federal Social Readaptation Center No. 1 ("Altiplano") in central Mexico. He had pending charges on drug trafficking, kidnapping, and for violating the Mexican federal law prohibiting the use of illegal weaponry.

In fears of retaliation from organized crime, the sub attorney general of Campeche, Jorge Obrador Capellini, along with subdirector of security in the municipality, Néstor Hernández Domínguez, including four policemen, resigned from their duties several days after the arrest of Vargas García. Exactly three months after the arrest on 18 July 2007, the municipal police chief of Ciudad del Carmen, Germán Soto López, was assassinated by unknown gunmen. His body was found dead by law enforcement with three gunshot wounds on his face inside a Chevrolet Tornado. The motives behind his death are unclear, but several local media outlets indicated that Soto López's assassination may be linked to the arrest of Vargas García.

==== Informant role ====
After Vargas García was arrested, he became an informant for the Mexican authorities, and confessed several aspects of the logistics structure in Los Zetas. He explained to the authorities that Los Zetas employed a project called La Expansión, which meant in the insides of the criminal underworld when several members of Los Zetas would go into a city and establish smuggling routes, and control or kill off opposition groups. The second phase of this process was known as La Contracción, when they would set up networks of radiocommunication in an area, organize safe houses, and call on gunmen to protect specific places.

He also confessed in 2007 that the Gulf Cartel and Los Zetas had several training camps in the states of Nuevo León and Tamaulipas, where their members would learn how to use assault rifles and received military training. This training intended to keep gunmen at a top level to ensure that the top leaders of the criminal organization were protected, secure drug shipments, and eliminate potential threats from rival gang members.

== Kingpin Act sanction ==
On 24 March 2010, the United States Department of the Treasury sanctioned Vargas García under the Foreign Narcotics Kingpin Designation Act (the "Kingpin Act"), for his involvement in drug trafficking along with fifty-three other international criminals and ten foreign entities. The act prohibited U.S. citizens and companies from engaging in any kind of business activity with him, and virtually froze all his assets in the U.S.

== See also ==
- Mexican drug war

== Sources ==
=== Bibliography ===
- Grayson, George W. (2012). The Executioner's Men: Los Zetas, Rogue Soldiers, Criminal Entrepreneurs, and the Shadow State They Created. Transaction Publishers. ISBN 9781412846172.
