= Alfonso Duarte Múgica =

Mexican general

General Alfonso Duarte Múgica
- Military career
- Allegiance: Mexico
- Branch: Mexican Army
- Rank: Divisional General
- Unit: Second Military Region
- Conflicts: Mexican drug war, Operation Baja California

Alfonso Duarte Múgica is a Mexican general who leads a battalion that combats the drug cartels (such as the Tijuana Cartel and the Sinaloa Cartel) in Tijuana. In March 2009, President Felipe Calderón "hailed the Baja California anti-drug offensive as a model for the country."

General Duarte received media attention in 2011 after a video was released in which he commented that Cuauhtémoc Cardona, the secretary-general of Baja California, was "drunk, rude and disrespectful."
