= Landero =

Landero is a surname. Notable people with the surname include:

- Humberto Gómez Landero (1904–1968), Mexican screenwriter and film director
- José Francisco Landero (b. 1971), Mexican politician
- Leticia López Landero (b. 1962), Mexican politician
- Max Landero (b. 1991), German politician
- Tomás López Landero (b. 1950), Mexican politician
- Toto Landero (1995–2022), Filipino professional boxer
- Alejandro Landero Gutiérrez (b. 1975), Mexican politician

== See also ==
- Landeros surname page
