= Federal Social Readaptation Center No. 1 =

Maximum security federal prison in Mexico

- Location within Mexico Location within State of Mexico
- Location: Almoloya de Juárez, Estado de México, Mexico; 19°25′15″N 99°44′56″W
- Security class: Maximum
- Capacity: 724
- Opened: 1990
- Former name: Maximum Security Penitentiary No. 1

The Federal Social Readaptation Center No. 1 (Spanish: Centro Federal de Readaptación Social Número 1) is a maximum-security federal prison located in Almoloya de Juárez, Mexico. Commonly referred to as El Altiplano, it is considered Mexico's principal maximum-security facility and has housed numerous high-profile inmates, including several of the country's most-wanted drug lords.

== Names ==
The prison was originally known as Maximum Security Penitentiary No. 1 "Almoloya de Juárez" (Penal de Máxima Seguridad No. 1 Almoloya de Juárez). It was later renamed Federal Social Readaptation Center No. 1 "La Palma" (Centro Federal de Readaptación Social No. 1 La Palma), before adopting its current name, Federal Social Readaptation Center No. 1 (Centro Federal de Readaptación Social Número 1).

== Construction ==
The prison was built between 1988 and 1990 under President Carlos Salinas de Gortari and received its first inmates in November 1991. Of significant concern to Mexican authorities is the risk that the prison could be attacked from the outside as part of an organized prison break. Therefore, the walls have been reinforced to as much as 1 meter (3.3 ft) in thickness to discourage ramming. Furthermore, the air space near the facility is restricted, and the authorities claim that cell phone transmissions are limited within 10 km (6.2 mi) of the prison to stymie communications between the inmates and their colleagues outside. Additionally, armored personnel carriers are based near the facility to protect it during a potential assault.

This facility is located in the Santa Juana Centro neighborhood of Almoloya de Juárez, in the State of Mexico, 25 kilometers (16 mi) from Toluca.

== Escapes ==
This prison was thought to be impenetrable until July 11, 2015, when Joaquín "El Chapo" Guzmán escaped through a tunnel nearly a mile long to a farm house located near Mexican Highway 134.

== Notable inmates ==
- Miguel Ángel Félix Gallardo (known as "El Padrino" and "El Jefe De Jefes"): The founder of the modern Mexican drug trade, former leader and founder of the Guadalajara Cartel, one of the first Mexican cartels which was formed as an alliance of the Sinaloa Cartel, the Tijuana Cartel, and the Juarez Cartel. The cartel had connections to the Medellin Cartel and the Cali Cartel, and transported cocaine to the United States for them
- Rafael Caro Quintero (known as "El Narco de Narcos"): former drug lord of the Guadalajara Cartel, extradited to the United States on February 27, 2025
- Héctor Luis Palma Salazar (known as "El Güero"): former drug lord of the Sinaloa Cartel
- Joaquín "El Chapo" Guzmán: former drug lord of the Sinaloa Cartel, extradited to the United States on January 19, 2017
- Mario Aburto Martínez: accused assassin of presidential candidate Luis Donaldo Colosio
- Miguel Treviño Morales (known as "Z-40"): former leader of the Los Zetas Cartel, extradited to the United States on February 27, 2025
- Eduardo Arellano Félix (known as "El Doctor"): former leader of the Tijuana Cartel
- Luis Fernando Sánchez Arellano (known as "El Ingeniero"): former deputy leader of the Tijuana Cartel
- Dionisio Loya Plancarte (known as "El Tío"): former leader of the Knights Templar Cartel
- Servando Gómez Martínez (known as "La Tuta"): former leader of the Knights Templar Cartel, extradited to the United States on August 12, 2025
- Omar Treviño Morales (known as "Z-42"): former deputy leader of the Los Zetas Cartel, extradited to the United States on February 27, 2025
- Osiel Cárdenas Guillén: former leader of the Gulf Cartel and Los Zetas
- Abigael González Valencia (known as "El Cuini"): former deputy leader of the Jalisco New Generation Cartel, extradited to the United States on August 12, 2025
- José Maria Guizar Valencia (known as "Z-43"): former top lieutenant of the Los Zetas Cartel
- Ovidio Guzmán López (known as "El Ratón"): former high-ranking member of the Sinaloa Cartel, extradited to the United States on September 15, 2023
- José Antonio Yépez Ortiz (known as "El Marro"): former leader of the Santa Rosa de Lima Cartel
- Guillermo Héctor Álvarez Cuevas (known as "Billy Álvarez"): former general director of 'La Cooperativa La Cruz Azul S.C.L.', former president of the Mexican football club Cruz Azul and former footballer.
- Daniel Arizmendi López (known as "El Mochaorejas"): leader of Kidnapping express, a kidnapping gang
- Various alleged members of the Los Zetas Cartel: Jaime González Durán (known as "El Hummer"), Nabor Vargas García (known as "El Débora") and "El Barbas"
- Teodoro García Simental (known as "El Teo"): drug lord who broke off from the Arellano Félix organization
- Various alleged Zapatistas
- Marco Antonio García Simental (known as "El Cris" & "El 8-9"): lieutenant in the Arellano Félix organization and older brother of "El Teo".

== In popular culture ==
The 2017 Netflix-Univision series, El Chapo, depicts Joaquín "El Chapo" Guzmán's incarceration and experience in the prison, and his escape through a tunnel on July 11, 2015, which disproved the assumption that the prison was impenetrable.
