= Luis Fernando Sánchez Arellano =

Mexican drug trafficker (born 1977)

Luis Fernando Sánchez Arellano Lerma
- Born: ca. 1977; Tijuana, Baja California, Mexico
- Other names: El Ingeniero, El Alineador
- Occupation: Leader of Tijuana Cartel
- Predecessor: Eduardo Arellano Félix
- Status: Arrested
- Reward amount: Mexico: $30 million Mexican pesos; US: US$5 million

Luis Fernando Sánchez Arellano (b. ca. 1977), commonly referred to by the alias El Ingeniero ("The Engineer"), is a Mexican suspected drug lord and former leader of the Tijuana Cartel, a drug trafficking organization based in Tijuana, Baja California. He competed with three other major cartels, the Juárez Cartel, the Gulf Cartel, and the Sinaloa Cartel, for the illegal drug corridors into the United States.

The Tijuana Cartel (or Arellano Félix Organization) has been described as one of the biggest and most violent criminal groups in Mexico. The Tijuana Cartel was initially composed of seven brothers and four sisters, who inherited the organization from Miguel Ángel Félix Gallardo upon his incarceration in Mexico in 1989 for his complicity in the murder of DEA Special Agent Enrique Camarena.

Following the death or arrest of the Arellano Félix family members, and especially following the arrest of his uncle Eduardo Arellano Félix on October 25, 2008, Luis Fernando Sánchez took the cartel leadership. He is the son of Alicia María Arellano Félix and not Enedina Arellano Félix as is often reported.

He remained head of the Tijuana Cartel until he was arrested and imprisoned in Mexico in June 2014.

== Sánchez Arellano lieutenants ==
On November 7, 2011, Juan Francisco Sillas Rocha, nicknamed El Sillas and La Rueda, was captured by the Mexican Army in the border city of Tijuana. He was the second-in-command in the Tijuana cartel, and considered by Secretaría de la Defensa Nacional as "one of the most violent" drug traffickers in Mexico, responsible for a number of murders. Sillas Rocha, under the tutelage of Sánchez Arellano, fought Teodoro García Simental (El Teo) for the control of the criminal activities in Tijuana between 2008 and 2010. He is also accused of kidnapping three women who were relatives of Ismael Zambada García (El Mayo), a drug baron of the Sinaloa cartel. Sillas Rocha was believed to be retaliating for the disappearance of his sister in 2010.

== Bounty ==
The Attorney General of Mexico offered a $30 million peso (US$2.5 million) bounty for information leading to his arrest.

== Arrest ==
At around 16:00 local time on June 23, 2014, Sánchez Arellano was arrested by soldiers of the Mexican Army and federal agents of the Procuraduría General de la República (PGR) at a Carl's Jr. fast food restaurant in the Mesa de Otay borough in Tijuana, Baja California, while watching the FIFA World Cup game between Mexico and Croatia. Sánchez Arellano was wearing the Mexico national team jersey and had the team's colors painted on his face. The arrest was made without a single shot fired. The security forces also confiscated US$100,000 he had with him at the moment of his arrest.

The following day, he was transferred to the SEIDO installations, Mexico's organized crime investigatory agency, in Mexico City to give his statement and be interrogated by law enforcement. The Mexican government accused Sánchez Arellano of being involved in organized crime, drug trafficking, and of violating Mexico's Federal Law of Firearms and Explosives. Authorities also believed he was responsible for several extortions, kidnappings, and homicides in the Baja California municipalities of Tijuana, Playas de Rosarito, Tecate and Ensenada.

On 25 June 2014, the PGR's Agency of Criminal Investigation (Spanish: Agencia de Investigación Criminal) officially confirmed the identity of Sánchez Arellano using DNA testing and photograph comparisons. The agency used the DNA samples the government had on its database of his relatives who were also involved in organized crime: his uncles Ramón, Benjamín, and Francisco Rafael Arellano Félix, along with his alleged mother Enedina. The results showed that Sánchez Arellano is biologically related to them and the Arellano Félix crime family, as initially presumed by law enforcement. In addition, the agency used at least five photographs law enforcement had of Sánchez Arellano to confirm similarities in its facial features. (Note: The PGR had another photograph of Sánchez Arellano on their most-wanted files that was not actually his. In 2011, they confirmed that the man in the picture was Raúl Inda González, an engineer from Ensenada, Baja California uninvolved with the Tijuana Cartel.) The images analyzed corresponded to one that circulated on the Internet, one that was from an I.D. card the drug lord took at Sam's Club under the alias Fernando Canalles Villanueva, one from his Baja California driver's license under the name Fernando Canales Villanueva, one from his passport under the name Fernando Canales Villanueva, one from the DEA's database, and the one taken during his arrest.

=== Imprisonment and trial ===
On 27 June 2014, Sánchez Arellano was transferred to the Federal Social Readaptation Center No. 1 (also known as "Altiplano") maximum-security prison in Almoloya de Juárez, State of Mexico. The imprisonment was allowed after a federal court found sufficient evidence against him. Three days later, a federal court in Toluca sent his trial to motion for his alleged criminal activities.

== See also ==
- Mexican drug war
