= Oaxaca Cartel =

Mexican drug cartel

- Founded: 1970s
- Founded by: Pedro Díaz Parada Cruz
- Founding location: Mexico
- Years active: 1980 - 2011
- Territory: Oaxaca
- Ethnicity: Mexican
- Criminal activities: Drug trafficking, money laundering, extortion, murder and arms trafficking
- Allies: Tijuana Cartel; Juárez Cartel

The Oaxaca cartel (Spanish: Cártel de Oaxaca or Díaz-Parada cartel (Note: The name is a reference to the founder of the Oaxaca Cartel, Pedro Díaz Parada Cruz, aka "El Capo del Istmo".) or Cártel del Istmo ) was one of the smaller drug cartels operating in Mexico and at the service of the Tijuana Cartel; it focused on marijuana and cocaine trafficking and operated in southern Mexico, particularly in the states of Oaxaca and Chiapas.

The cartel was led by the Díaz-Parada brothers, Pedro, Eugenio Jesús a.k.a. 'Don Chuy' and Domingo Aniceto a.k.a. 'Don Cheto'. Pedro Díaz-Parada was first arrested by the Mexican Army in 1985 and then by Federal Police agents in January 2007. Pedro Díaz Parada was sentenced to 33 years' imprisonment in 1985, but subsequently escaped prison twice – once in 1987 and again in 1992. The Oaxaca cartel reportedly joined forces with the Tijuana Cartel in 2003 and press reports indicate that Díaz Parada was the most important representative of the Tijuana cartel in southeastern Mexico at the time of his latest arrest in January 2007.

Pedro Díaz Parada began his days in the drug trafficking world by sowing marijuana in San Pedro Totolapa, Oaxaca, during the 1970s. He extended his activity to cocaine trafficking by using speed boats and light aircraft. He was arrested and sentenced in 1985 to 33 years in prison and held in the Santa María Ixcotel prison, from where he escaped a few days later. In September 1987, Judge Villafuerte Gallegos was murdered near his home in Cuernavaca, Morelos, where he had been moved in order to protect him from the threats of Díaz Parada. Díaz was arrested a second time in 1990 and again escaped prison in 1992 from the 'Reclusorio Oriente' prison in Mexico City. He was arrested a third time in January 2007. His possible substitutes may have been his brothers Eugenio Jesús Díaz Parada and Domingo Aniceto Díaz Parada.

== See also ==
- Mexican drug war
- Mérida Initiative
- War on drugs
