= Teodoro García Simental =

Mexican organized crime figure

- Born: 1974 (age 51–52); Culiacán, Sinaloa, Mexico
- Other names: El Teo, El Tres Letras, El Lalo, El Alamo; El K-1
- Occupation: Drug lord
- Employer(s): Tijuana Cartel, Sinaloa Cartel
- Known for: Drug trafficking, kidnapping, extortion
- Successor: Manuel Garcia Simental

Notes
- 2 million USD bounty. Arrested on January 12, 2010.

Teodoro García Simental (a.k.a.: El Teo and El Tres Letras, born 1974) is a former drug lord and lieutenant of the Mexican criminal organization known as the Tijuana Cartel, and later allied with the Sinaloa Cartel. He was arrested by Mexican Federal Police - Special Forces on 12 January 2010 in La Paz, Baja California Sur.

== Biography ==
García started working for the Tijuana Cartel in 1995, along with his brother, Antonio García Simental (alias "8-9" or "El Chris"), who was a cartel enforcer, under the orders of Ramón Arellano Félix. When the Tijuana Cartel leader Eduardo Arellano Félix was arrested on October 25, 2008, a violent power struggle erupted between García and Luis Fernando Sánchez Arellano over the leadership of the Tijuana Cartel. García left the organization, formed his own gang, and forged an uneasy alliance with the rival Sinaloa Cartel. When splitting from the Tijuana Cartel, his faction engaged in a war with it, which caused violent crime in Tijuana to increase significantly. According to Tijuana's Chief of Police, García was principally responsible in the late 2000s for the increase in the number of homicides in the city.

García is best known for running an extortion and kidnapping network, and is also known for dissolving the bodies of those who were in business with rival drug gangs by drowning them in caustic soda. Upon being arrested, García's lieutenant, Santiago Meza López — known as the Stew Maker, claimed to have dissolved over three hundred bodies this way in 2008. The Mexican Army stated that it believed Meza's claims to be true.

== Arrest ==
The Mexican Federal Police was offering a two million USD bounty for information leading to the capture of Teodoro García Simental. He was also wanted by the U.S. Drug Enforcement Administration (DEA).

García was arrested on January 12, 2010, by Mexican Federal Police in a luxury home complex named Fidepaz, located in La Paz, Baja California Sur. He was arrested together with an individual named Diego Raymundo Guerrero García. One month later, on February 7, 2010, Manuel García Simental, García's younger brother and lieutenant, was arrested in the Baja California port city of La Paz. Authorities feared that the younger García was planning to reignite a gang war for control of Tijuana's drug trafficking routes.

== See also ==
- Mérida Initiative
- Mexican drug war
- List of Mexico's 37 most-wanted drug lords
- War on drugs
