= Benjamín Arellano Félix =

Mexican drug trafficker

- Born: Benjamín Arellano Fèlix; March 12, 1952 (age 74); Culiacán, Sinaloa, Mexico
- Other names: Mín, El Señor El patron
- Occupations: Tijuana Cartel founder and leader
- Children: 2
- Status: Incarcerated at USP Coleman I
- Conviction: Found Guilty
- Criminal charges: Drug trafficking, money laundering, murder
- Penalty: 25 years in a US federal prison

Benjamín Arellano Félix (born 12 March 1952) is a Mexican former drug lord who alongside his brothers founded and led the Tijuana Cartel or "Arellano-Félix Organization” until his arrest in March 2002.

== Biography ==
Benjamín Arellano Félix, who worked closely with his brothers, was one of Mexico's most powerful drug lords and the supplier of one-third of the U.S.'s cocaine. Benjamín had six brothers:

- Francisco Rafael Arellano Félix (24 October 1949-18 October, 2013) – Shot dead by gunmen disguised as clowns at his birthday party, on 18 October 2013.
- Carlos Arellano Félix (believed to have been born 20 August 1955), a medical doctor, is not currently wanted.
- Eduardo Arellano Félix (born 11 October 1956) – Captured in 2008.
- Ramón Arellano Félix (born 31 August 1964) – Shot dead by police in 2002.
- Luis Fernando Arellano Félix (believed to have been born 26 January 1966) is not currently wanted.
- Francisco Javier Arellano Félix (born 11 December 1969) – Captured in 2006.

He also has four sisters. Two of them, Alicia and Enedina, are most active in the cartel's affairs.

Benjamín was first arrested on 18 June 1982, in Downey, California, for receiving 100 kilos of cocaine smuggled through the San Ysidro border. However, he escaped custody.

The Arellano Félix brothers obtained their first big break in 1989, when they inherited the organization from their uncle, Miguel Ángel Félix Gallardo, after they showed early promise smuggling consumer electronics over the U.S.–Mexico border. By 1998, the Arellano brothers had been indicted in the U.S. for drug trafficking, and Ramón had been put on the FBI's 10 Most Wanted list.

Despite the brothers' audacity, they remained untouchable for 13 years. This was accomplished, in part, with large amounts of cash bribes to Mexican politicians and police commanders, at the cost of an estimated US$1 million per week.

Benjamín Arellano tried to clear his name after the 1993 murder of Cardinal Juan Jesús Posadas Ocampo, in which he had been implicated. That high-profile assassination brought international attention to his trafficking organization and, although this forced Benjamín to lie low and adopt false names, he continued to live in casual confidence, apparently unafraid of capture. He had a secret meeting with the Apostolic Nunciature to Mexico, Girolamo Prigione on December 1, 1993. Another of Benjamin's brothers, Francisco, was arrested soon afterward on drug charges, and Benjamín, Ramón, and Javier officially became fugitives.

== Kingpin Act sanction ==
On 1 June 2000, the United States Department of the Treasury sanctioned Benjamín under the Foreign Narcotics Kingpin Designation Act (sometimes referred to simply as the "Kingpin Act"), for his involvement in drug trafficking, along with eleven other international criminals. The act prohibited U.S. citizens and companies from doing any kind of business activity with him, and virtually freezing all his assets in the U.S.

== Arrest ==
The U.S. DEA learned that Benjamín's oldest daughter had a very recognizable and rare facial deformity, and that she was the "soft spot" in her father's violent life. By tracing her, they found her father. Benjamin was arrested on 9 March 2002 by the Mexican Army in the state of Puebla, Mexico. He had a $2 million USD bounty for his arrest.

Authorities are not sure where Benjamin's money went, beyond some real estate investments in Tijuana. Mexican officials say it has been invested in U.S. real estate, while their U.S. counterparts say much of it is hidden in cash in Mexico.

Benjamin was extradited to the United States on 29 April 2011 to face charges of trafficking cocaine into California. On January 4, 2012, he pleaded guilty to racketeering and conspiracy to launder money, and was sentenced to 25 years in prison on 2 April 2012.

Some objects that were confiscated from him during his arrests are on display at the Museo del Enervante in Mexico City.

As of September 2025 Benjamin is incarcerated at USP Coleman I with a BOP Register Number of 00678-748. He is scheduled for release on April 28, 2032.

== In popular culture ==
- In the 2017 Netflix and Univision series, El Chapo, Carlos Hernán Romo plays Benjamín Avendaño (a fictionalized portrayal of Benjamín Arellano Félix).
- He is portrayed by Alfonso Dosal in the Netflix series Narcos: Mexico.
- A 2003 Mexican film, El fin de los Arellano (The End of the Arellanos), featured characters supposedly based on the Arellano brothers; however, its plot bore practically no resemblance to the actual events.
- The Arellano brothers were allegedly an inspiration for the two secondary characters of "the Obregón brothers", featured in the 2000 US film Traffic.

== See also ==
- Illegal drug trade
- Mérida Initiative
- Mexican drug war
- War on drugs
- El Chapo
- List of Mexicans
