= Sandra Ávila Beltrán =

Mexican drug cartel leader

- Born: 16 October 1960 (age 66); Tijuana, Baja California, Mexico
- Other names: La Señora de Acero (The Lady of Steel); La Reina del Pacífico (The Queen of the Pacific)
- Criminal charges: Money laundering and possession of illegal firearms
- Criminal status: Released in 2015
- Relatives: Miguel Ángel Félix Gallardo (uncle); Rafael Caro Quintero

Sandra Ávila Beltrán (born 16 October 1960) is a Mexican drug lord, dubbed "La Reina del Pacífico" (The Queen of the Pacific) by the media. She was arrested on September 28, 2007, and was charged with organized crime and conspiracy to drug trafficking. Some charges were later dropped but she was still held on possession of illegal weapons and money laundering, pending her extradition to the United States. On August 10, 2012, she was extradited to the United States to answer to criminal charges by the U.S. government.

Mexican and U.S. officials consider her as an important link between the Sinaloa Cartel in Mexico and the Colombian Norte del Valle Cartel.

== Biography ==
Ávila Beltrán was born in Baja California, Mexico, the daughter of María Luisa Beltrán Félix and Alfonso Ávila Quintero, a family member of Rafael Caro Quintero, a former leader of the Guadalajara Cartel. Family connections have played a major role in her criminal career, having kinship with the Beltrán-Leyva Brothers, then top heads of the Sinaloa cartel "federation." Ávila Beltrán was in fact a "third-generation" drug trafficker in her family. Officials in Mexico say Ávila Beltrán is the niece of Miguel Ángel Félix Gallardo, the godfather and the boss of bosses of the Mexican drug trade who is now serving a 40-year sentence for his involvement in the 1984 murder of Enrique Camarena, a U.S. Drug Enforcement Administration (DEA) special agent. Her great uncle Juan José Quintero Payán was extradited to the United States on drug trafficking charges. On her mother's side, the Beltráns got involved in heroin smuggling in the 1970s and later diversified into cocaine. DEA officials state that Ávila Beltrán never shrank from employing the violence that comes with the turf and that "she used the typical intimidation tactics of Mexican organizations."

She reportedly had affairs with several well-known drug barons in her youth. She was married twice; both of her husbands were ex-police commanders who became drug traffickers and both were later killed by hired assassins. The police attribute her rise to power in the drug world primarily to her most recent relationship with Juan Diego Espinoza Ramírez, alias The Tiger, who is said to be an important figure in the Colombian Norte del Valle Cartel. Ávila Beltrán lived in Guadalajara, Jalisco, and Hermosillo, Sonora until the police found more than 9 tons of cocaine on a ship in the Pacific port of Manzanillo, Colima in 2001 and tracked the shipment to her and her lover Espinoza Ramírez.

== Arrest ==
Despite her high-profile lifestyle, Beltrán long avoided leaving police any evidence. In 2002, however, she unexpectedly contacted authorities for help when her teenage son was kidnapped for a US$5 million ransom. She eventually got her son back, but not without raising suspicions that launched an investigation. It took more than four years and 30 federal agents to close in and finally arrest Ávila. She was arrested, along with Espinoza Ramírez, on 28 September 2007, in Mexico City. She was charged with and convicted of laundering money for billions of dollars' worth of drugs smuggled from Colombia to Mexico.

In a tape of her police interrogation, she describes herself as a housewife who earns a little money on the side "selling clothes and renting houses." When asked why she had been arrested, she responded, "Because of an extradition order to the United States." Her life behind bars at the Santa Martha Acatitla women's prison in Mexico City has apparently not been to her liking as she filed a complaint with a Mexico City human rights commission, saying her cell had insects, which she referred to as noxious fauna. She also said the ban on bringing in food from restaurants violated her human rights.

In January 2011 an investigation was launched after a doctor was allowed to enter the prison to give Beltrán a Botox injection treatment, a therapy that is not authorized for inmates. The prison's director and hospital chief were relieved of their duties. All of the drug charges were dropped in early 2011. As of February 2015 Sandra is free according to CNN "Now, after more than seven years behind bars, the woman known as 'The Queen of the Pacific' is free."

=== Extradition and deportation ===
In June 2012 several Mexican judges ruled out major obstacles to extradite Ávila Beltrán to the United States on cocaine trafficking charges that date back to 2001. Originally, previous requests seeking to extradite Ávila Beltrán had been denied twice by a panel and then by a judge, but Ávila Beltrán had to answer to the charges by the United States for several cocaine shipments seized in Chicago. On 10 August 2012, Ávila Beltrán was extradited to the United States and flown to Florida to face cocaine possession and trafficking charges. Ávila denied the charges and as part of the plea deal said she provided "financial assistance for travel, lodging, and other expenses" to Espinosa from 2002 to 2004.

On April 23, 2013, Avila Beltran pled guilty to being an accessory after the fact to the crime of drug trafficking, and on July 25 she was sentenced to 70 months in federal prison, with credit for time served.

Avila Beltran was released from the U.S. Bureau of Prisons July 30 and turned over to ICE custody. At that time, she was processed to be administratively deported to Mexico as an aggravated felon, where she was immediately arrested on money laundering charges on 20 August 2013 and was sentenced to five more years in prison and a fine. She was imprisoned at the Federal Social Readaptation Center No. 4 federal prison in Tepic, Nayarit. She was released in 2015 and now lives in the city of Guadalajara. Since her arrest in 2007, she spent a total of seven years in prison, including two years in isolation.

== Popularity ==
=== Literature ===
She also published a book, The Queen of the Pacific: Time to Talk, based on a series of prison interviews she gave to Mexican journalist Julio Scherer.

Arturo Pérez-Reverte, author of the book The Queen of the South (2002), stated that the story of his heroine Teresa Mendoza is partly based on Sandra Ávila Beltrán's life.

=== Music ===
Los Tucanes de Tijuana wrote a folk ballad that pays homage to Sandra Ávila as "a top lady who is a key part of the business."

Los Tigres del Norte wrote a song called "La Reina del Sur", based on the story of Teresa Mendoza, the fictional drug lord in La Reina del Sur by Arturo Pérez-Reverte.

Los Tucanes de Tijuana wrote a song called "La Señora de Acero", based on the story of Sara Aguilar, the fictional drug lord in Señora Acero by Telemundo.

=== Television ===
- In the second season of the TV Series El cartel, Ávila is portrayed by the Mexican actress Patricia Manterola as the character of Andrea Negrette.
- Isabella Bautista, a character in the Netflix series Narcos: Mexico portrayed by Teresa Ruiz, is loosely based on Ávila.
- Two shows based on the novel La reina del sur by Arturo Pérez-Reverte based on Ávila's life exist: La Reina del Sur and Queen of the South.
