= Foreign Narcotics Kingpin Designation Act =

US anti-trafficking act

- Other short titles: Department of Energy Sensitive Country Foreign Visitors Moratorium Act; International Narcotics Trafficking Act; Kingpin Act
- Long title: An Act to provide for the imposition of economic sanctions on certain foreign persons engaging in, or otherwise involved in, international narcotics trafficking.
- Acronyms (colloquial): FNKDA
- Nicknames: Intelligence Authorization Act for Fiscal Year 2000
- Enacted by: the 106th United States Congress
- Effective: December 3, 1999

Citations
- Public law: 106-120
- Statutes at Large: 113 Stat. 1606 aka 113 Stat. 1626

Codification
- Titles amended: 21 U.S.C.: Food and Drugs
- U.S.C. sections created: 21 U.S.C. ch. 24 § 1901 et seq.

Legislative history
- Introduced in the House as H.R. 1555 by Porter Goss (R–FL) on April 26, 1999; Committee consideration by House Intelligence (Permanent Select), House Armed Services; Passed the House on May 13, 1999 (passed voice vote); Passed the Senate on July 21, 1999 (passed voice vote); Reported by the joint conference committee on November 5, 1999; agreed to by the House on November 9, 1999 (agreed voice vote) and by the Senate on November 19, 1999 (agreed voice vote); Signed into law by President Bill Clinton on December 3, 1999

The Foreign Narcotics Kingpin Designation Act, better known as the Kingpin Act, is landmark federal legislation in the United States intended to address international narcotics trafficking by imposing United States sanctions on foreign persons and entities involved in the drug trade.

The Act allows the president of the United States and United States secretary of the treasury to publicly identify "significant foreign narcotics traffickers" and to freeze their assets. The Act also prohibits any "United States person" from conducting business with any designated foreign narcotics traffickers, and provides for both civil penalties and criminal prosecution for violations.

The work of enforcing the Act has been delegated to the Treasury's Office of Foreign Assets Control (OFAC), overseen by United States Congress and advised by several United States federal executive departments, the United States Intelligence Community, and federal law enforcement agencies.

The creation of the Kingpin Act followed President Bill Clinton's use of Executive Order 12978 to target and isolate members of the Cali Cartel of Colombia beginning in 1995. Paul Coverdell and Porter Goss championed the legislation with the support of Clinton in 1999. Since then, the president and Treasury have invoked the Kingpin Act to target a variety of foreign drug trafficking organizations.

== Legislative history ==
Before the Kingpin Act, President Bill Clinton invoked the National Emergencies Act and International Emergency Economic Powers Act through his Executive Order 12978 of 1995. The Order targeted the leadership of the Cali Cartel, at the time the largest narcotrafficking organization in Colombia, by adding their names to the Treasury's Specially Designated Nationals and Blocked Persons List.

A Treasury report to Congress reported the E.O. 12978 sanctions as successful, and that 40 cartel-related companies with estimated combined annual sales of over $200 million were either liquidated or in the process of liquidation.

Senator Paul Coverdell and Representative Porter Goss championed the legislation in Congress. It was folded into the Intelligence Authorization Act for Fiscal Year 2000 through a joint conference.

Bill Clinton approved the final legislation with a signing statement:

This Act contains a provision, known as the ‘‘Foreign Narcotics Kingpin Designation Act,’’ that establishes a global program targeting the activities of significant foreign narcotics traffickers and their organizations. The new Act provides a statutory framework for the President to institute sanctions against foreign drug kingpins when such sanctions are appropriate, with the objective of denying their businesses and agents access to the U.S. financial system and to the benefits of trade and transactions involving U.S. businesses and individuals. Working with other nations, I intend to use the tools in this provision to combat the national security threat posed to the United States by international drug trafficking.

The first designation under the Kingpin Act was made on June 1, 2000. This initial list included members of four Mexican cartels Jesús Amezcua Contreras and Luis Ignacio Amezcua Contreras (of the Colima Cartel), Benjamín Arellano Félix and Ramón Arellano Félix (of the Tijuana Cartel), Rafael Caro Quintero (of the Guadalajara Cartel); and Vicente Carrillo Fuentes (Juárez Cartel); two accused traffickers from the Golden Triangle, Wei Hsueh-kang and Chang Chi-fu; and Nigerian brothers Abeni O. Ogungbuyi and Oluwole A. Ogungbuyi.

The Kingpin Act legislation delegated rulemaking authority to the U.S. Department of the Treasury. The Treasury's adopted rules were first published in 65 FR 41336 as "Reporting and Procedures Regulations; Foreign Narcotics Kingpin Sanctions Regulations" on July 5, 2000

As of February 2022, 2,182 individuals and entities have been added to the Counter Narcotics Trafficking Sanctions list.

== Provisions ==
The Kingpin Act contains details about how narcotics traffickers and their associates are identified and designated for sanctions; how property is blocked; enforcement against violations; and the ongoing review of the program.

=== Executive and legislative powers ===
The legislation provides that the president submit an annual report to the U.S. Congress to identify "the foreign persons that the President determines are appropriate for sanctions," and to detail "the President's intent to impose sanctions upon these significant foreign narcotics traffickers pursuant to this chapter."

The names and much other information are released publicly and to several Congressional Committees. However, as much of the information used to justify targeting a significant foreign narcotics trafficker is Classified or Law Enforcement Sensitive a more detailed classified report is provided solely to the United States House Permanent Select Committee on Intelligence and United States Senate Select Committee on Intelligence.

=== Designation process ===
The presidential report to Congress is the main means for designating a significant foreign narcotics traffickers are designated under authorities granted by 21 U.S.C. § 1904(b)(1).

Additionally, the United States Secretary of the Treasury may make "derivative designations" in consultation with the U.S. Attorney General, the U.S. Director of National Intelligence, the Director of the Federal Bureau of Investigation, the Administrator of Drug Enforcement, the U.S. Secretary of Defense, and the U.S. Secretary of State.

These include foreign persons (including corporate persons) found to be:

- "materially assisting in, or providing financial or technological support for or to, or providing goods or services in support of, the international narcotics trafficking activities of a significant foreign narcotics trafficker so identified in the report"
- "owned, controlled, or directed by, or acting for or on behalf of, a significant foreign narcotics trafficker"
- playing "a significant role in international narcotics trafficking."

When announcing new or revised sanctions, Treasury Office of Foreign Assets Control has released network map illustrations detailing relationships between and among designated significant foreign narcotics traffickers and derivative designees in alleged drug trafficking organizations, e.g., the relationships of "Tier I" traffickers Benjamín Arellano Félix and Ramón Arellano Félix with "Tier II" subordinates and front companies within the Tijuana Cartel.

=== Blocking assets and prohibiting transactions ===
After the president or Treasury's designation, the named person or entity is subjected to an asset freeze of "all such property and interests in property within the United States, or within the possession or control of any United States person." There is also a reciprocal prohibition placed on all United States persons against any transaction with a person or entity designated under the Act.

For purposes of each of these measures, "United States person" is defined expansively and includes any United States citizen or national, permanent resident alien, an entity organized under the laws of the United States (including its foreign branches), or any person within the United States. As with many United States sanctions programs, the Kingpin Act imposes a set of requirements for those involved in international trade.

Regulations created under the Act elaborate on the scope of transactions prohibited and types of property affected.

=== Enforcement and penalties ===
The Kingpin Act forbids United States persons from activities that have "the effect of evading or avoiding, and any endeavor, attempt, or conspiracy to violate" prohibitions against transacting business with designated narcotraffickers. Regulations further point to use of the statute against making false statements.

The Act provides for maximum criminal penalties for corporate officers can reach up to $5 million and 30 years’ imprisonment and for corporations up to $10 million. Others may face fines pursuant to Title 18 U.S. Code and up to 10 years in prison. A civil penalty of over $1.6 million per violation may also be assessed.

Regulations created under the Act detail a process by which the Director of OFAC may issue a "prepenalty notice" to a suspected violator detailing alleged conduct, allowing the suspected violator to respond and enter informal settlement.

== Use of the act ==
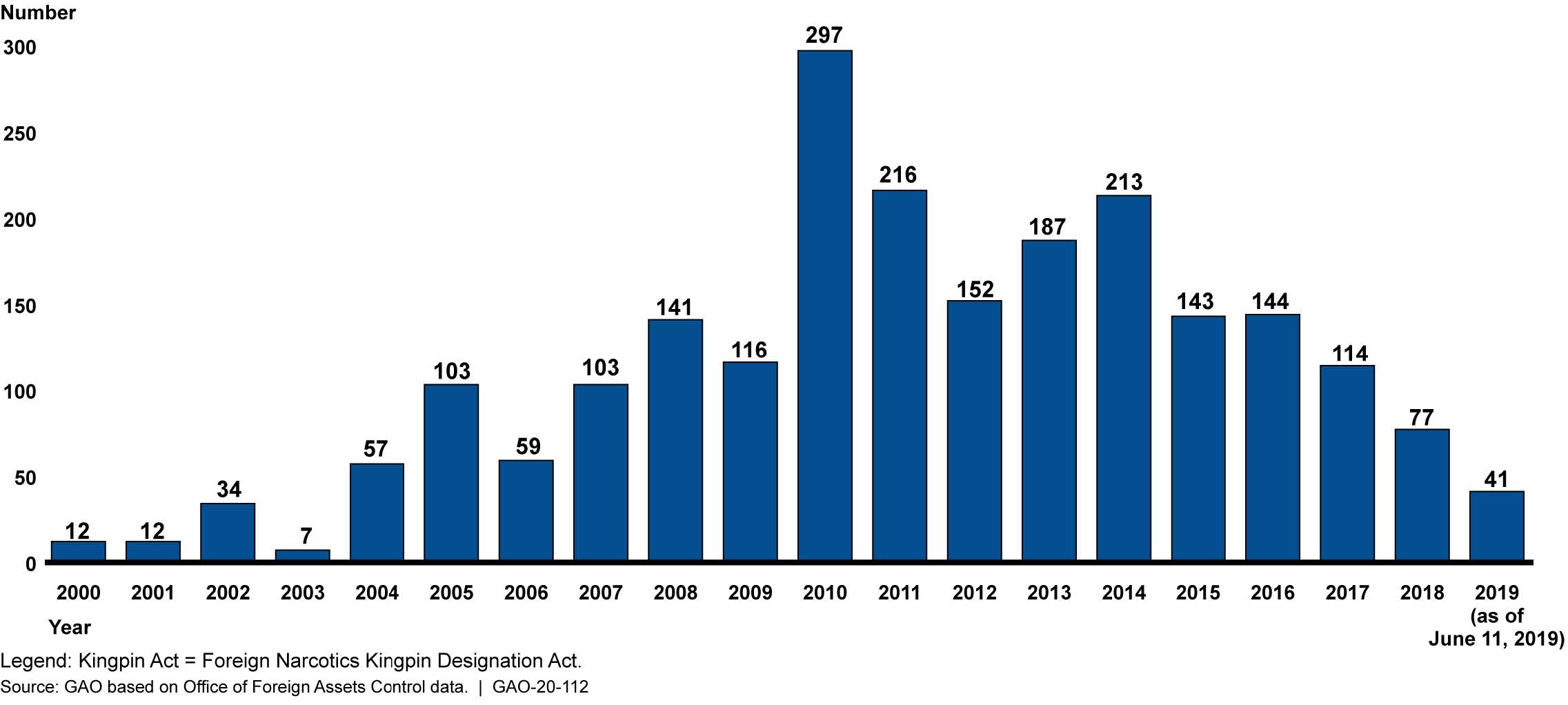
Kingpin Act designations, 2000–2019

Every presidency since 2000 has made Kingpin Act designations, including Bill Clinton, George W. Bush, Barack Obama, Donald Trump, and Joseph R. Biden.

The New York Times has said that the act has been used for the US to pursue dozens of criminal organizations involved in narcotics across the world. It also wrote that, "The act allows the Treasury Department to freeze any assets of the cartels found in United States jurisdictions and to prosecute Americans who help the cartels handle their money."

=== Civil penalties ===
In 2008, A.G. Edwards subsidiary A.G. Edwards and Sons voluntarily disclosed that it failed to block investment accounts and had processed transactions of accounts owned by narcotics traffickers. It settled by remitting $122,358.35.

On October 7, 2015, a case concerning the Honduran Banco Continental was the first time the act had been used against a bank outside the United States.

On July 27, 2016, the OFAC issued a Finding of Violation against BBVA USA for maintaining the accounts of two persons on OFAC's List of Specially Designated Nationals and Blocked Persons. The two persons are accused of being money launderers for Rafael Caro Quintero, a DEA Most Wanted Fugitive.

In August 2016, AXA Equitable Life Insurance Company and Humana, Inc each received a Finding of Violation for failing to cease transacting business with three customers who were named under the Kingpin Act. The products in question were health insurance policies. Neither company nor their subsidiaries were fined as they cooperated with the OFAC investigation.

=== Criminal cases ===
The criminal portion of the Kingpin Act is specific to U.S. persons. While there have been thousands of designated foreign traffickers under the Kingpin Act since 2000, there have been few prosecutions under the act itself. In December 2020, Chief United States District Judge of the United States District Court for the District of Columbia Beryl A. Howell wrote in a Memorandum Opinion that "in the last five years, two individuals were convicted under 21 U.S.C. § 1904," citing statistics received from the United States Sentencing Commission.

Since that Opinion, the Kingpin Act charge of "Engaging in Transactions and Dealings in Properties of a Designated Significant Foreign Narcotics Trafficker" has been employed twice against the Mexican-American relatives of high-profile Mexican cartel narcotraffickers.

==== United States v. Jessica Johanna Oseguera González ====
In February 2020, the Drug Enforcement Administration arrested Jessica Johanna Oseguera González, a dual-nationality Mexico/U.S. citizen. Oseguera González had been attending a proceeding for her brother, Rubén Oseguera González (alias, "El Menchito") in the United States District Court for the District of Columbia, where he was accused of participation in the narcotrafficking of the Jalisco New Generation Cartel (CJNG).

The United States Attorney for the District of Columbia charged Oseguera González with the Kingpin Act crime of Engaging in Transactions or Dealings in Properties of a Designated Foreign Person for her role as nominal owner and officer of six businesses designated for providing material support to the narcotics trafficking activities of the CJNG and her father, the fugitive and accused CJNG boss Nemesio Oseguera Cervantes, “El Mencho.” The U.S. Attorney also charged Oseguera González of assisting her uncle, Abigael González Valencia, leader of the CJNG-allied gang Los Cuinis. Gonzalez pleaded guilty in March 2021. She was sentenced to 30 months in prison and 24 months supervised release.

==== United States v. Emma Coronel Aispuro ====
Coronel was arrested at Dulles International Airport on February 22, 2021. The Federal Bureau of Investigation's arrest warrant stated their probable cause included evidence of Coronel shuttling messages from Guzman to Sinaloa Cartel associates, assisting Guzman's escape from Federal Social Readaptation Center No. 1 "Altiplano" in 2015 through bribery and, following his recapture, and helping coordinate another escape attempt aborted following Guzman's extradition. The affidavit cited a handwritten letter written and signed by Guzman, as well as the statements of two unnamed cooperating witnesses who had worked with Guzman.

On June 10, 2021, the United States Attorney for the District of Columbia and Coronel Aispuro agreed to a plea deal, in which she waived indictment and pleaded guilty in the U.S. District Court for the District of Columbia to a felony criminal information with three counts:

- Conspiracy to Distribute Heroin, Cocaine, Marijuana and Amphetamines for Unlawful Importation to the United States (21 U.S.C. §§ 959, 960, 963)
- Conspiracy to launder Monetary Instruments (18 U.S.C. § 1956)
- Engaging in Transactions and Dealings in Properties of a Designated Significant Foreign Narcotics Trafficker (21 U.S.C. §§ 1904 1906)

On November 30, 2021, Judge Rudolph Contreras of the U.S. District Court for the District of Columbia sentenced Coronel to three years in prison, followed by four years of supervised release. Judge Contreras did not sentence Coronel to the four years requested by prosecutors, noting that she was a teenager when she married Guzman and admitted her guilt upon capture.

== See also ==
- Aviation Drug-Trafficking Control Act of 1984
- Chemical Diversion and Trafficking Act
- People sanctioned under the Foreign Narcotics Kingpin Designation Act
- Mexican drug war
- Plan Colombia
- Specially Designated Nationals and Blocked Persons List
- United Nations Convention Against Illicit Traffic in Narcotic Drugs and Psychotropic Substances
- United States sanctions
