= Eduardo Arellano Félix =

Mexican drug trafficker

- Born: October 11, 1956 (age 70); Culiacán, Sinaloa, Mexico
- Other names: El Gualín, El Doctor
- Occupation: Drug lord
- Employer: Tijuana Cartel
- Height: 5'10''
- Predecessor: Francisco Javier Arellano Félix
- Successor: Luis Fernando Sánchez Arellano
- Criminal penalty: 15 years' imprisonment
- Relatives: Brothers: Leonidas Arellano, Ramón, Javier, and sister: Enedina Arellano Félix

Notes
- $5 million reward. Arrested on October 26, 2008, in Tijuana, Mexico.

Eduardo Arellano Félix (born October 11, 1956) is a Mexican drug trafficker, brother of Benjamín, Ramón, Javier and sister, Enedina, all drug traffickers. The Arellano-Félix Organization, also known as the Tijuana Cartel, has been responsible for numerous murders and the smuggling of thousands of tons of marijuana, cocaine, heroin and methamphetamine for more than a decade. The DEA believes that the Arellano-Félix brothers were responsible for the numerous smuggling tunnels that were found in January 2006.

Arellano is believed to be one of the most sophisticated brothers and had taken control of the cartel. He was wanted by Mexican and United States authorities in connection with the smuggling of several tons of marijuana and cocaine from Mexico into the U.S. each year. He and his sister, Enedina Arellano Félix, became the leaders of the drug cartel after their brother Javier Arellano Félix was arrested by U.S. authorities in Baja California on August 16, 2006. His brother Ramón Arellano Félix, believed to be the most ruthless member, was eventually killed in a Mazatlán shootout with the Federal Police in February 2002. Another brother, Benjamín Arellano Félix, "the mastermind", was arrested in March 2002.

== Kingpin Act sanction ==
On 1 June 2004, the United States Department of the Treasury sanctioned Arellano Félix under the Foreign Narcotics Kingpin Designation Act (sometimes referred to simply as the "Kingpin Act"), for his involvement in drug trafficking along with nine other international criminals and two entities. The act prohibited U.S. citizens and companies from doing any kind of business activity with him, and virtually froze all his assets in the U.S.

== Arrest ==
Arellano was captured by the Mexican Federal Police after a shootout in Tijuana, Baja California, on October 26, 2008. Eduardo was sought by Interpol in 180 countries, and the U.S. State Department had been offering US$5,000,000 for information leading to his arrest. Eduardo Arellano Félix was charged in the U.S. Southern District of California with conspiracy to import cocaine and marijuana.

Authorities say Arellano did not go down without a fight, despite having his 11-year-old daughter near him. On the same day, the Mexican military also arrested another alleged lieutenant of the Tijuana Cartel in a separate incident: Luis Ramirez Vázquez, known as El Güero Camarón, or The Blond Shrimp. Although the arrests were blows to the Arellano Félix cartel it did not dismantle the organization, which was afterwards led by Eduardo's nephew, Luis Fernando Sánchez Arellano. and is now led by Eduardo's sister Enedina, after Luis Fernando's own arrest.

=== Extradition and sentence ===
On September 1, 2012, he was extradited to the U.S. to face charges of money laundering and drug trafficking among other crimes. He is the last Arellano Félix brother named in a 2003 indictment to be extradited. On August 18, 2013, he was sentenced to 15 years in prison. His sentence, however, was shorter than the one his brothers received because the U.S. court deemed that he was "less involved in the unsavory aspects" on the Tijuana Cartel. U.S. District Judge Larry A. Burns reminded Arellano that he was convicted either way because he was well-aware of the violent doings of his criminal organization, and told him that he should be embarrassed by his actions because they had a negative effect on the community and on the relationship between Mexico and the U.S. After having completed 8 years in the U.S., he has been deported back to Mexico in August 2021 and immediately transferred to the Federal Social Readaptation Center No. 1 maximum security prison in Almoloya de Juárez, State of Mexico.

== See also ==
- Continuing Criminal Enterprise
- Mexican drug war
- Tijuana Cartel
- List of Mexicans
