= Ramón Arellano Félix =

Mexican drug trafficker (1964–2002)

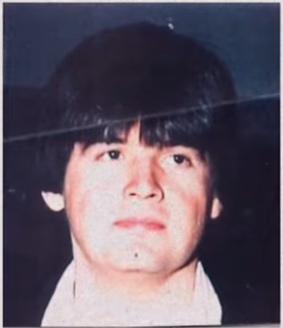

FBI Ten Most Wanted Fugitive
- Charges: Conspiracy to import cocaine and marijuana
- Alias: Món; Comandante Món; Colores

Description
- Born: Ramón Eduardo Arellano Félix; 31 August 1964; Culiacán, Sinaloa, Mexico
- Died: 10 February 2002 (aged 37); Mazatlán, Sinaloa, Mexico
- Cause of death: Gunshot wound
- Height: 6 ft 2.5 in (189 cm)

Status
- Added: September 18, 1997
- Number: 451
- Deceased prior to capture

Ramón Eduardo Arellano Félix (31 August 1964 – 10 February 2002) was a Mexican drug lord who alongside his brothers founded and led the Tijuana Cartel (a.k.a. the Arellano-Félix Organization). He was the leader of the enforcement wing of the organization until his death on 10 February 2002.

== Biography ==
Standing 189 cm (6 ft 2 1/2 in) tall and weighing 114.7 kg (253 lb), Ramon Arellano Félix was allegedly one of the most ruthless members of the cartel and was a suspect in various murders. Arellano Félix ordered the 1998 massacre of nineteen members of the Castro Ramírez family outside of Ensenada, Baja California. The family was related to an alleged associate of the Arellano-Félix Cartel, and oversaw the production and transport of cannabis to Tecate and Tijuana. By murdering the Ramírez family, the Arellano-Felix Cartel eliminated the last obstacle to them taking full control of the area. The massacre broke an unspoken pact amongst druglords: "don't touch the family" (el de a la familia no se le toca).

While in hiding in Los Angeles in 1995, Arellano Félix was unwittingly the subject of a televised prank when he was approached outside Mann's Chinese Theatre in Hollywood by Rupert Jee, who was filming a segment for the Late Show with David Letterman.

On 18 September 1997, Ramon Arellano Félix became the 451st fugitive to be placed on the Ten Most Wanted list. Leading to his Most Wanted Fugitive listing in the United States, he had been charged in a sealed indictment in the United States District Court for the Southern District of California, with Conspiracy to Import Cocaine and Marijuana in drug trafficking.

=== Kingpin Act sanction ===
On 1 June 2000, the United States Department of the Treasury sanctioned Ramón under the Foreign Narcotics Kingpin Designation Act (sometimes referred to simply as the "Kingpin Act"), for his involvement in drug trafficking, along with eleven other international criminals. The act prohibited U.S. citizens and companies from doing any kind of business activity with him, and virtually froze all his assets in the U.S.

=== Death and aftermath ===
On 10 February 2002, Ramón Arellano Félix was killed in a gunfight in Bugambilia Street, Mazatlán, Sinaloa, where he was stopped due to a traffic infraction by Mexican police officer, Ángel Antonio Árias Torres. Arellano Félix drew his gun and mortally wounded Árias Torres twice in the chest, who fired back and killed Arellano Félix with a single bullet in the head while falling to the ground and dying. According to Ismael Zambada García (alias "El Mayo"), Joaquín "El Chapo" Guzmán ordered Árias Torres to enact the traffic stop and Arellano Félix's execution.

Arellano's older brother, Benjamín Arellano Félix, the cartel's mastermind, was arrested weeks later on 9 March. On 14 August 2006, the youngest of the Arellano brothers, Francisco Javier Arellano Félix, was arrested with some associates at sea, by the United States Coast Guard. They were in international waters 25 km (16 mi) off the coast of Cabo San Lucas, Baja California Sur. Francisco Javier was extradited to the U.S. on 16 September 2006.

The only brother of the Arellano Félix cartel then at large, Eduardo Arellano Félix, was captured by the Mexican Army on 26 October 2008. At the time, the US State Department had been offering a reward of up to US$5 million for information leading to his arrest. According to a Mexican official, at the time of Eduardo Arellano Félix's capture, control of the cartel passed to Luis Fernando Sánchez Arellano, a son of Eduardo Arellano Félix's sister Alicia.

At around 16:00 local time on 23 June 2014, Sánchez Arellano was arrested by soldiers of the Mexican Army and federal agents of the Procuraduría General de la República (PGR) at a Carl's Jr. fast food restaurant in the Mesa de Otay borough in Tijuana, Baja California, while watching the FIFA World Cup game between Mexico and Croatia. Sánchez Arellano was wearing the Mexico national team jersey and had the team's colors painted on his face. The arrest was made without a single shot fired. The security forces also confiscated US$100,000 he had with him at the moment of his arrest.

== In popular culture ==
In the 2017 Netflix and Univision series, El Chapo, Rolf Petersen plays Ramón Avendaño (a fictionalized portrayal of Ramón Arellano Félix).

Arellano Félix is portrayed by Manuel Masalva in the 2018 crime drama, Narcos: Mexico.

A 2003 Mexican film, "El fin de los Arellano" ("The End of the Arellanos"), featured characters supposedly based on the Arellano brothers; however, its plot bore practically no resemblance to the actual events.

The Arellano brothers were allegedly an inspiration for the two secondary characters of "the Obregón brothers", featured in the 2000 US film Traffic.

== Gallery ==
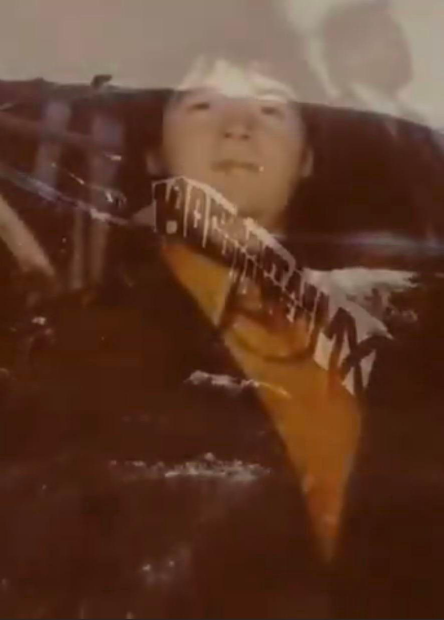
Ramón Arellano Félix as a kid

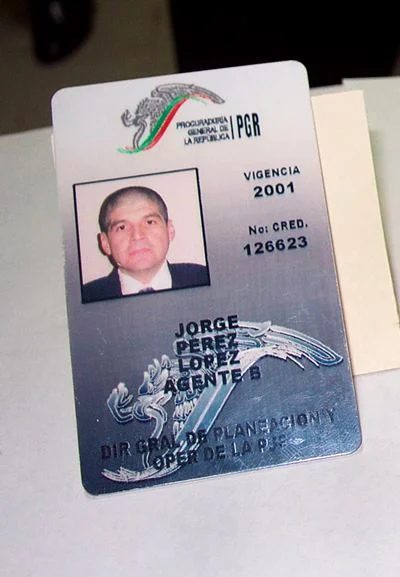
Fake ID retrieved from Ramón's body

== See also ==
- Illegal drug trade
- Mérida Initiative
- Mexican drug war
