= Tijuana Cartel =

Criminal organization based in Tijuana, Mexico

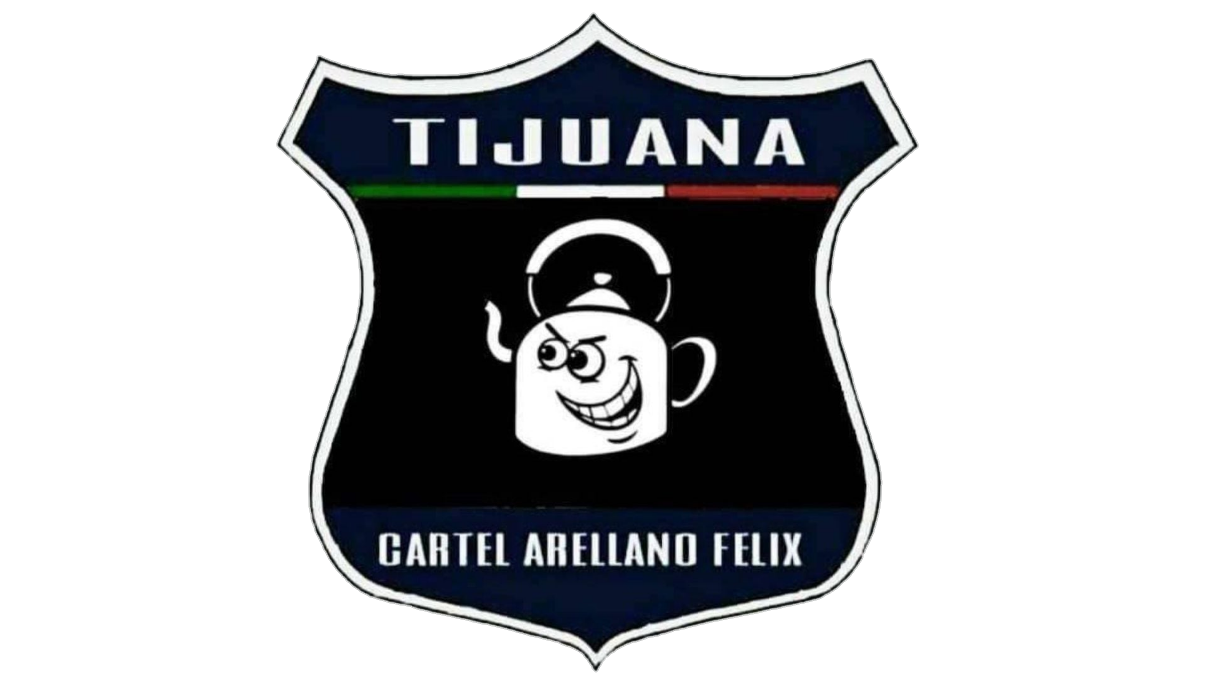
- Founded: 1987; 39 years ago
- Founded by: Benjamín Arellano Félix; Ramón Arellano Félix
- Founding location: Tijuana, Baja California, Mexico
- Years active: 1987–present
- Territory: Tijuana; Ensenada
- Ethnicity: Mexican
- Membership: 1,000-3,000
- Leaders: Enedina Arellano Félix; Edgardo Leyva Escandón
- Activities: Drug trafficking, money laundering, people smuggling, murder, arms trafficking, bribery
- Allies: Logan Heights Gang; Russian mafia Cali Cartel (defunct); Norte del Valle Cartel (defunct); Oaxaca Cartel (defunct) los chapitos (Sinaloa Cartel splinter)
- Rivals: Sinaloa Cartel; Gulf Cartel; La mayiza

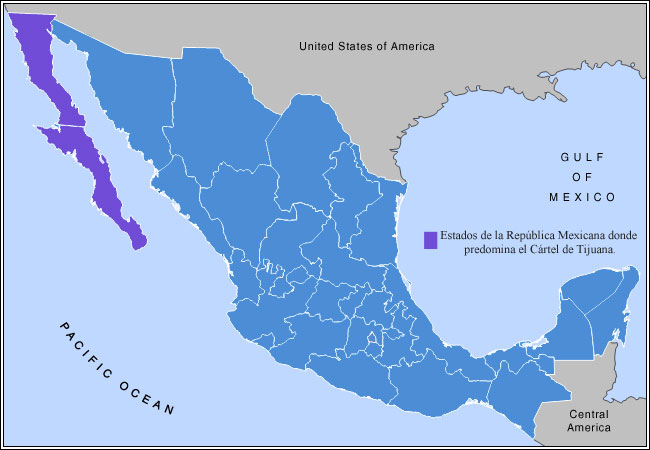
Areas predominantly controlled by the Tijuana Cartel shown in purple, 2008

The Tijuana Cartel (Spanish: Cártel de Tijuana, pronounced [ˈkaɾtel ðe tiˈxwana]), formerly also known as the Arellano-Félix Cartel (Spanish: Cártel de los Arellano Félix, CAF), is a diminished Mexican drug trafficking organization, based in Tijuana, Baja California, Mexico.

Founded by the Arellano-Félix family as a branch (“plaza”) of the Guadalajara Cartel, the branch would become an independent cartel following the 1989 arrest of Guadalajara leader Miguel Ángel Félix Gallardo.

The cartel, once was described as "one of the biggest and most violent criminal groups in Mexico", has been reduced to a few cells following a series of conflicts. Incursions by the Sinaloa Cartel into Tijuana-held Baja California in 2006, the arrests or deaths of all founding Arellano-Félix members by 2013, and infighting between two rival factions from 2008 to 2010 severely fractured and weakened the cartel by the mid-2010s.

In 2016, remnants of the Tijuana Cartel allied themselves with, and became partially absorbed by, the Jalisco New Generation Cartel (CJNG), becoming known as the Cartel de Tijuana - Nueva Generación (English: New Generation Tijuana Cartel), along with remnants of the Beltrán-Leyva Organization (BLO) to create an anti-Sinaloa Cartel alliance.

The current status of the cartel is unknown, as it operates as a vassal of the CJNG but retains some independent identity and command.

== History ==
Miguel Ángel Félix Gallardo, the founder of the Guadalajara Cartel, was arrested in 1989. While incarcerated, he remained one of Mexico's major traffickers, maintaining his organization via mobile phone until he was transferred to a new maximum security prison in the 1990s. At that point, his old organization broke up into three factions: the Tijuana Cartel led by his nephews, the Arellano Félix brothers, the Juarez Cartel, led by Amado Carrillo Fuentes, and the Sinaloa Cartel, run by former lieutenants Héctor Luis Palma Salazar and Joaquín Guzmán Loera, a.k.a. El Chapo.

Currently, the majority of Mexico's smuggling routes are controlled by three key cartels: Gulf, Sinaloa and Tijuana—though Tijuana is the least powerful. The Tijuana cartel was further weakened in August 2006 when its chief, Javier Arellano Félix, was arrested by the U.S. Coast Guard on a boat off the coast of Baja California. Mexican army troops were sent to Tijuana in January 2007 in an operation to restore order to the border city and root out corrupt police officers, who mostly were cooperating with the Tijuana cartel. As a result of these efforts, the Tijuana cartel is unable to project much power outside of its base in Tijuana. Much of the violence that emerged in 2008 in Tijuana was a result of conflicts within the Tijuana cartel: on one side, the faction led by Teodoro García Simental (a.k.a. El Teo) favored kidnappings. The other faction, led by Luis Fernando Sánchez Arellano (a.k.a. El Ingeniero), focused primarily on drug trafficking. The faction led by Sánchez Arellano demanded the reduction of the kidnappings in Tijuana, but his demands were rejected by García Simental, resulting in high levels of violence. Nonetheless, most of the victims in Tijuana were white-collar entrepreneurs, and the kidnappings were bringing "too much heat on organized crime" and disrupting the criminal enterprises and interests of the cartel.

The Mexican federal government responded by implementing "Operation Tijuana", a coordination carried out between the Mexican military and the municipal police forces in the area. To put down the violence, InSight Crime states that a pact was probably created between military officials and members of the Sánchez Arellano faction to eliminate Simental's group. The U.S. authorities speculated in 2009 that Tijuana's former police boss, Julián Leyzaola, had made agreements with Sánchez Arellano to bring relative peace in Tijuana. With the arrest of El Teo in January 2010, much of his faction was eliminated from the city of Tijuana; some of its remains went off and joined with the Sinaloa Cartel. But much of the efforts done between 2008 and 2010 in Tijuana would not have been possible without the coordination of local police forces and the Mexican military – and possibly with a cartel truce – to put down the violence.

The relative peace in the city of Tijuana in 2010–2012 has raised speculations of a possible agreement between the Tijuana Cartel and the Sinaloa Cartel to maintain peace in the area. According to Mexican and U.S. authorities, most of Tijuana is under the dominance of the Sinaloa cartel, while Luis Fernando Sánchez Arellano of the Tijuana cartel remains the "head of that puppet empire". To be exact, experts told InSight Crime that the peace exists because Joaquín Guzmán Loera wants it that way, and argued that his organization—the Sinaloa Cartel—has become spread too thin with its wars with Los Zetas and the Juárez Cartel and that opening a third war would be inconvenient. The Tijuana cartel, however, has something their rivals do not have: a long-time family with business and political connections throughout the city. InSight Crime believes that this could explain why the Sinaloa cartel has left Sánchez Arellano as the figurehead, since it might be too costly for El Chapo financially and politically to make a final push. Moreover, the Tijuana cartel charges a toll ("piso") on the Sinaloa cartel for trafficking drugs in their territory, which serves as an illustration of the Tijuana cartel's continued hegemony as a local group. Despite the series of high-ranking arrests the cartel suffered throughout 2011–2012, its ability to maintain a highly centralized criminal infrastructure shows how difficult it is to uproot cartels who have long established their presence in a community.

Despite being a shell of what it once was in the early 2000s, the group appears to retain significant control in the state of Baja California, as of 2020.

In June 2020, it was reported that the Sinaloa Cartel controlled much of the Tijuana Cartel's former territory. Around this time, the Tijuana Cartel formed an alliance with the Jalisco New Generation Cartel (CJNG), which resulted in the cartel being rebranded as the Tijuana New Generation Cartel (Cartel de Tijuana Nueva Generación), but this alliance disintegrated very quickly when the Jalisco Cartel showed it intended to take the place of the Sinaloa Cartel rather than aid in helping the Tijuana Cartel reestablish dominance and independence. As a result, the Tijuana Cartel reversed their branding back to Cartel Arellano Félix. Afterwards, they planned the assassination of Cabo 33, the Jalisco Cartel's head of operations in Baja California. After effectively removing the Jalisco Cartel's influence in Baja California, the Tijuana Cartel further engaged the Sinaloa Cartel for control of the Tijuana plaza and surrounding areas. With the release of Luis Fernando Sánchez Arellano in 2023 and the consolidation of power in Baja California, as well as an alliance with Rafael Caro Quintero and the Sonora plaza, it is speculated that the Tijuana Cartel may rise again to become a dominant player in Baja California.

In November 2020 it was reported emissaries from the Los Chapitos faction of the Sinaloa Cartel had been seen in Tijuana attempting to form an alliance with the now resurgent Tijuana Cartel. Following the defection of El Mayo's head of operations in Tijuana and the reintegration of its Cabo San Lucas branch, the Arellano-Félix Organization has retaken control of Tijuana from outside influences as well as other important hubs in Baja California, leaving Mexicali and Rosarito as the last known Sinaloa Cartel outposts in Baja California. How long they will remain under the cartel's control is unknown, with the rapid defection of Sinaloa Cartel operatives in traditionally Arellano-Félix territories.

== Organization ==
The Arellano Félix family was initially composed of seven brothers and four sisters, who inherited the organization from Miguel Ángel Félix Gallardo upon his incarceration in Mexico in 1989 for his complicity in the murder of DEA Special Agent Enrique Camarena. The brothers' death and arrests during the 2000s impacted the Arellano Félix cartel, but they did not dismantle the organization.

The Tijuana Cartel has infiltrated the Mexican law enforcement and judicial systems and is directly involved in street-level trafficking within the United States. This criminal organization is responsible for the transportation, importation, and distribution of multi-ton quantities of cocaine and marijuana, as well as large quantities of heroin and methamphetamine.

The organization has a reputation for extreme violence. Ramón Arellano Félix ordered a hit which resulted in the mass murder of 18 people in Ensenada, Baja California, on September 17, 1998. Ramón was eventually killed in a gun battle with police at Mazatlán in Sinaloa, on February 10, 2002.

The Arellano Félix family has seven brothers:

- Rafael Arellano Félix† (born 24 October 1949) – captured (1993), released (2008), murdered on 18 October 2013
- Benjamín Arellano Félix (born 12 March 1952) – captured on March 9, 2002, extradited on April 29, 2011
- Carlos Arellano Félix (born 20 August 1955) – not currently wanted
- Eduardo Arellano Félix (born 11 October 1956) – captured on October 26, 2008, extradited on August 31, 2012
- Ramón Arellano Félix† (born 31 August 1964) – deceased, shot by police in February 2002
- Luis Fernando Arellano Félix (believed to be born 26 January 1966) – not currently wanted
- Javier Arellano Félix (born 11 December 1969) – captured in August 2006

They also have four sisters, of whom Alicia and Enedina are most active in the cartel's affairs.

Eduardo Arellano Félix was captured by the Mexican Army after a shootout in Tijuana on October 26, 2008; he had been the last of the Arellano Félix brothers at large. Luis Fernando Sánchez Arellano took over the cartel's operations. His two top lieutenants were Armando Villareal Heredia and Edgardo Leyva Escandon. Fernando Sánchez Arellano was arrested by Mexican police in June 2014. Leyva remains at large and Villareal was captured in July 2011.

On November 5, 2011, Mexican troops arrested cartel lieutenant Francisco Sillas Rocha, who was reported to be the cartel's number two leader, and some of his close associates. Observers argued that Rocha's arrest put the Tijuana Cartel "on the ropes", though some differed on whether or not the arrest put "the final nail in the coffin" for the Tijuana Cartel.

In February 2020, senior cartel operator Octavio Leal Hernández, also known as "Chapito Leal," was arrested with seven others by Tijuana police for stealing cars from a used-car dealership at gunpoint and possessing marijuana.

== Activities ==
The Tijuana cartel is present in at least 15 Mexican states, with important areas of operation in Tijuana, Mexicali, Tecate, and Ensenada in Baja California, in parts of Sinaloa, and in Zacatecas. After the death in 1997 of the Juárez Cartel's Amado Carrillo Fuentes, the Tijuana Cartel attempted to gain a foothold in Sonora. The Oaxaca Cartel reportedly joined forces with the Tijuana Cartel in 2003.

Fourteen Mexican drug gang members were killed and eight others were injured in a gun battle in Tijuana near the U.S. border on Saturday, April 26, 2008, that was one of the bloodiest shootouts in the narco-war between the Tijuana Cartel and the Sinaloa Cartel. On December 1, 2011, William R. Sherman, acting special agent in charge of the Drug Enforcement Administration's office in San Diego, announced that the cartel had been annihilated and that the Sinaloa Cartel now controlled a large number of the drug routes the Tijuana Cartel once had. On December 12, 2011, Tijuana Police Chief Alberto Capella Ibarra announced that captured cartel lieutenant Francisco Sillas Rocha had confessed that the Tijuana Cartel and the Sinaloa Cartel had formed a truce and that the Tijuana Cartel was seeking to merge with the Sinaloa Cartel. After Benjamin Arellano-Felix pleaded guilty to racketeering and conspiracy to launder money on January 4, 2012, it was accepted that the Tijuana Cartel had greatly lost influence. It was also reported that the cartel had lost their former Tijuana hotbed to the Sinaloa Cartel. The clan of the Arellano Felix continues, although diminished after the capture of their leaders.

== Captures and trial ==
In October 1997, a retired U.S. Air Force C-130A that was sold to the airline Aeropostal Cargo de México was seized by Mexican federal officials, who alleged that the aircraft had been used to haul drugs for the cartel up from Central and South America, as well as around the Mexican interior. Investigators had linked the airline's owner, Jesús Villegas Covallos, to Ramón Arellano Félix.

On August 14, 2006, Francisco Javier Arellano Félix was apprehended by the United States Coast Guard off the coast of Baja California Sur. On November 5, 2007, Francisco was sentenced to life in prison, at ADX Florence, after pleading guilty in September 2007 to running a criminal enterprise and laundering money. It was later reduced to 23 1/2 years in 2015.

Benjamin Arellano Felix, who was arrested on March 9, 2002, by the Mexican Army in the state of Puebla, was extradited to the United States on April 29, 2011, to face charges of trafficking cocaine into California. He later pleaded guilty to racketeering and conspiracy to launder money, and was sentenced to 25 years in jail on April 2, 2012. Once that is served, he will be sent back to Mexico to finish another 22 years for a conviction there.

On August 31, 2012, Eduardo Arellano Felix was extradited to the United States to face trial for racketeering, money laundering and narcotics trafficking charges in the Southern District of California. He pleaded guilty to money laundering and is serving 15 years.

On July 13, 2023, a nearly 20 year investigation against dozens of Tijuana Cartel defendants concluded when former cartel hitman Juan Francisco Sillas Rocha pled guilty to three charges, including conspiracy to commit murder, in a U.S. federal court in Fargo, North Dakota.

== Los Palillos ==
Los Palillos ("The Toothpicks") was a group operating within Tijuana Cartel, who worked as the armed wing of the Tijuana Cartel in the United States, for the control of the criminal activities in California and Nevada.

They were a criminal organization that operated from San Diego to Los Angeles and other California and Nevada cities. To avoid constant confrontations with the police and police interest reducing his wealth, Ramon Arellano Felix began bribing almost any official possible. Felix received money from members of the criminal group and local criminals to "kick up" money from their illegal activities such as kidnapping and contract killing take half of the money and give it to the Tijuana Cartel to launder it. That was how the Arellano Felix brothers' operation included other clans in Tijuana, San Diego and Los Angeles.

== Presence in Colombia ==
The Tijuana Cartel is believed to have ties with FARC, a Colombia guerrilla group that also has ties with other Mexican drug cartels. In the 1990s, the Tijuana Cartel decided to expand their market opportunities in Colombia, exchanging drugs for weapons. In the 1990s they formed an alliance with the Cali Cartel and Norte del Valle Cartel for the cocaine business.

== United States Involvement ==
The Arellano-Felix Organization, also known as "The Tijuana Cartel," located in Tijuana, Mexico attested great influence and impact on the United States in its prime era of operation. So strongly, that Mexican authority proves not enough to control the infiltration of the American people. Its decentralized location in Mexico and proximity to the United States border allowed the Arellano-Felix brothers easy routes to control the illicit drug markets in Tijuana and southern California. The infamous drug cartel led by the Arellano-Felix family spent years transporting, importing, and distributing cocaine, marijuana, methamphetamine, and heroin into the United States. In its most successful era of drug distribution, the Arellano-Felix Organization was solely responsible for a significant portion of the cocaine distribution to the United States. The impacts on the United States population were deemed so significant that Members of Congress proposed further changes to migrant policies in border cities like Tijuana. The Congressional Research Service identified the Tijuana Cartel as one of the four dominant drug trafficking organizations in 2020. The impact on the United States was so significant that heavy involvement by the American government was required. Action by the Mexican Authority alone could not maintain the needed control. Control was difficult as the Arellano-Felix Organization focused on strategic coordination, protection, and security. Their protection strategy and preparations have been described as "paramilitary in nature" by Mexican enforcement officials. International connections as well as internal communication centers provide the Tijuana Cartel with strong surveillance and awareness of government infiltration and plans. With such sophisticated precautionary measures, the Arellano-Felix brothers proved difficult to counter. American strategy included instituting a Joint Task Force in southern California. This task force included sectors of the Drug Enforcement Administration and the Federal Bureau of Investigation. By 2008, the United States was able to capture the last of the five influential Arellano-Felix brothers. The story does not end here. Although one cartel was weakened, simple economics demonstrate how the illicit drug market and organized crime continues to prosper despite cartels coming and going. The downfall and desizing of one cartel, like the Tijuana Cartel, provides the opportunity for another to retake territory and expand their business. In this case, the Sinaloa Cartel outweighed the falling Arellano-Felix Organization and gained control of the Tijuana/ San Diego route. While the United States proved successful in minimizing and fighting the Arellano-Felix Organization, the effectiveness on combating the war on drugs was unsuccessful.

== See also ==
- Illegal drug trade in Colombia
- List of gangs in Mexico
- List of Mexico's 37 most-wanted drug lords
- Mérida Initiative
- Mexican drug war
- War on drugs

== Bibliography ==
- Longmire, Sylvia (2011). Cartel: The Coming Invasion of Mexico's Drug Wars. Palgrave Macmillan. ISBN 978-0230111370.
