= Francisco Javier Arellano Félix =

Mexican drug lord (born 1969)

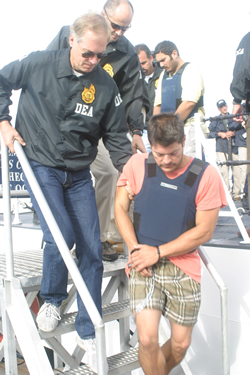
- Félix being escorted by the DEA
- Born: December 11, 1969 (age 56); Culiacan, Sinaloa, Mexico
- Other name: El Tigrillo
- Height: 1.75 m (5 ft 9 in)
- Criminal charges: Organized crime, money laundering
- Penalty: Life imprisonment; commuted to 23 1/2 years imprisonment

Francisco Javier Arellano Félix (born 11 December 1969) is a former Mexican drug lord who alongside his brothers founded and led the Tijuana Cartel (a.k.a. the Arellano-Félix Organization) until his capture by the United States Coast Guard on August 16, 2006.

The Tijuana Cartel used to be one of the largest Mexican drug cartels. It is well known for its employment of enforcers recruited from Mexican and San Diego street gangs. In addition to enforcers, many Latin American street gangsters were trained to become assassins in the cartel, which has a reputation for extreme brutality and violence. At its height in the late 1990s, the cartel was believed to be responsible for supplying nearly half the cocaine sold in the United States.

The gang made headlines in January 2006 after it was discovered they had dug tunnels from Tijuana, Baja California, into the United States at Otay Mesa, California.

== Kingpin Act sanction ==
On 1 June 2004, the United States Department of the Treasury sanctioned Arellano Félix under the Foreign Narcotics Kingpin Designation Act (sometimes referred to simply as the "Kingpin Act"), for his involvement in drug trafficking along with nine other international criminals and two entities. The act prohibited U.S. citizens and companies from doing any kind of business activity with him, and virtually froze all his assets in the U.S.

== Capture and prosecution ==
Arellano Félix, nicknamed "El Tigrillo" ("Little Tiger") and "El Titi", was captured by the Coast Guardsmen aboard the USCGC Monsoon on August 16, 2006, while fishing on the Dock Holiday some 25 km off the coast of Baja California Sur, in international waters. Arellano Félix was brought into United States Coast Guard Sector San Diego by USCG Cutter Petrel, commanded by Master Chief Petty Officer M. Martin. The Drug Enforcement Administration had received a tip about his whereabouts. A US$5 million bounty had been offered for his capture, but the information leading to his capture was apparently not from someone seeking the reward. On November 5, 2007, he was sentenced to life in prison after pleading guilty in September 2007 to running a criminal enterprise and laundering money. The final decision as to where he would be housed rested with the Federal Bureau of Prisons (BoP).

In June 2015, Arellano Félix's sentence was reduced to 23 1/2 years for cooperation with authorities during his incarceration. His present location and the date of his release both rest with and are guarded by the Bureau of Prisons and the U.S. Marshal Service.

== In popular culture ==
A character very loosely based on Francisco Javier Arellano Félix was featured in the 2017 television series El Chapo.

== See also ==
- Mexican drug war
- Tijuana Cartel
- Juan Jesús Posadas Ocampo
- List of crime bosses convicted in the 21st century
- Ramón Arellano Félix
