= Mexican Federal Highway 36 =

Highway in Mexico

Federal Highway 36
- Carretera federal 36

Route information
- Maintained by Secretariat of Infrastructure, Communications and Transportation
- Length: 229.00 km (142.29 mi)

Major junctions
- West end: Topia, Durango
- East end: Los Herrera, Durango

Location
- Country: Mexico
- State: Durango

Highway system
- Mexican Federal Highways; List; Autopistas; State Highways in Durango
← Fed. 35	→ Fed. 37

Federal Highway 36 (Spanish: Carretera Federal 36, Fed. 36) is a toll-free part of the federal highways corridors (Spanish: los corredores carreteros federales) of Mexico. The highway construction is entirely within the state of Durango. The official start of the highway indicates it begins in the city of Topia then runs eastward to the town of Los Herrera. However, the paved and graded portion of the road does not go to Topia. Along the graded and paved road at a point about 96 km (60 mi) from Santiago de Papasquiaro a narrow and ungraded road leads off of Fed. 36 (at 25.142227 -106.452685) and extends 28 km (17 mi) to Topia, Durango. The road from Fed. 36 to Topia is a narrow dirt road. The paved and graded road system continues past that intersection and has been extended year by year in a westward direction to the crest of the Sierra Madre Occidental and down the western slope of the Sierras, following the drainage of the Topia River, past Canelas, Durango and then on to the end of construction in a dead end about 24 km. beyond Canelas at the remote village of La Angostura. This village just happens to be the home of Ines Coronel Barreras, a cattle rancher and Sinaloa drug lord, who is the father of Emma Coronel Aispuro, the Mexican beauty queen and wife of the internationally notorious drug lord Joaquin "El Chapo" Guzman, currently indicted and in jail in the United States for drug related crimes. This terminus of the graded and paved road is only 32 km (20 mi) by direct line from Tamazula de Victoria, Durango. It is unknown whether there will be further road construction beyond La Angostura to Tamazula de Victoria in the coming years though that would be feasible from an engineering standpoint. Until the completion of the highway construction an alternative route which is ungraded branches off the paved road on the crest of the mountains and continues on to highways in the state of Sinaloa. Those routes are all noted below.

== The Eastern Terminus of Fed. 36 ==
Fed. 36 has an eastern terminus that starts from a "T" intersection with Fed. 23, as that highway extends between Santiago Papasquiaro Municipality and Tepehuanes Municipality. The intersection of Fed. 36 with Fed. 23 is at 25.1233581 -105.4772634, a point 10 km north of Santiago Papasquiero and 42 km south of Tepehuanes. This intersection is 5 km. south of Las Herreras, Durango so this town may is referred to as the eastern terminus of the highway.

== The Route of Fed. 36 to the End of Pavement ==
From the intersection with Fed. 23, Fed. 36 climbs up into a chain of coastal mountains to the west. The graded and paved road passes first through Cienega de Salpica el Agua, Durango, at 25.026032 -105.760208, and then Cienega de Nuestra Senora de Guadalupe, Durango at 25.065278 -106.329167, and then extends past a turn off (at 25.142227 -106.452685) of a rough, dusty ungraded side road to Topia, Durango, after which the paved and graded road continues to the crest of the Sierra Madre Occidental, and then continues down the west side of the range, passing a side road to Canelas, Durango at 25.105064 -106.554766, and continues on for 24 km (15 mi) before coming to a dead end. This improved and paved extension of MJH 36 has been extended periodically in the last 10 years. It terminates at the remote village of La Angostura, beyond Canelas, Durango on the west side of the Sierra Madre Occidental, in the drainage of the Topia River. This village just happens to be the home of Ines Coronel Barreras, a cattle rancher and Sinaloa drug lord, who is the father of Emma Coronel Aispuro, the Mexican beauty queen and wife of the internationally notorious drug lord Joaquin "El Chapo" Guzman, currently indicted and in jail in the United States for drug related crimes. This terminus of the graded and paved road is only 32 km (20 mi) by direct line from Tamazula de Victoria, Durango. It is unknown whether there will be further road construction to Tamazula de Victoria in the coming years though that would be feasible from an engineering standpoint.

== Side Road to Topia ==
At a point about 96 km (60 mi) from Santiago de Papasquiaro a road leads off of Fed. 36 (at 25.142227 -106.452685) and extends 28 km (17 mi) to Topia, Durango. The road from Fed. 36 to Topia is a narrow dirt road. Although Topia is sometimes listed as the western terminus of Fed. 36, the pavement and improved construction for Fed. 36 does NOT extend to Topia, and in fact goes far beyond this intersection to the crest of the Sierra Madre Occidental and then goes down the west side, to an unfinished dead end some 24 km (15 mi) beyond Canelas, Durango, as noted in the next section.

== Recent extension of pavement of MFH 36 from the crest of the mountains to an unfinished end, at La Angostura, Durango ==
An improved and paved extension of MJH 36 has been extended periodically in the last 10 years. It runs to the remote village of La Angostura, beyond Canelas, Durango on the west side of the Sierra Madre Occidental, in the drainage of the Topia River. This village just happens to be the home of Ines Coronel Barreras, a cattle rancher and Sinaloa drug lord, who is the father of Emma Coronel Aispuro, the Mexican beauty queen and wife of the internationally notorious drug lord Joaquin "El Chapo" Guzman.

After passing through the small village of La Canada del Macho, Durango (25.11871 -106.472833) on the crest of the Sierra Madre Occidental, the paved road descends some 20 km (12 mi) to a turn off (at 25.104064 -106.554766) to the village of Canelas. From this point a paved road continues about 7.5 km (4.7 mi) to Canelas, Durango (25.122475 -106.546284). This road of total length of about 26.5 km (16.5 mi) distance from the crest of the Sierras to Canelas, Durango descends from an altitude of 2550 m. on the crest of the Sierra Madre Occidental to about 1360 m. at Canelas.

From the Canales turn off (at 25.104064 -106.554766), a graded and partially paved road continues on down the west side of the Sierra Madre Occidental for about 25 km (16 mi) to the small community of Angostura, where the graded road ends at 25.08391 -106.686261.

It is unknown if any road construction is being planned beyond the current end of grading. Since this road ends at the small community of Angostura, Durango, which happens to be the home of Ines Coronel Barreras, a cattle rancher and Sinaloa drug lord, who is the father of Emma Coronel Aispuro, the Mexican beauty queen and wife of the internationally notorious drug lord Joaquin "El Chapo" Guzman, it is uncertain whether there is any plan to construct the road down to Tamazula de Victoria, Durango, which lies only 32 km (20 mi) to the west. If completed this road would then be another reliable road crossing the Sierra Madre Occidental.

== Network of current unimproved roads branching off the pavement and continuing down the west side of the Sierra Madre Occidental to connect to Pacific coast highways ==
About 7 km (4.3 mi) after the paved highway passes through the small community of La Cañada del Macho (25.118271, -106.472833), a unpaved and unimproved road branches off (at 25.072852 -106.483743) the pavement and continues down off the western slope of the Sierra Madre Occidental finally reaching highways on the Pacific coast. From Canada del Macho these roads pass south through the village of Santa Efigenia (24.993033° -106.503020°), then south to a point (24.948837° -106.516770°), and then west to Llano Blanco (24.953691° -106.601568°), south through El Bajio (24.934765° -106.625653°) and La Huerta (24.861016° -106.610385°), to a fork (24.822571° -106.632597°) where the road turns west and descends down the mountain to Chacala, Durango (24.811031 -106.738821) and southwest to Bayosa, Durango (24.771525 -106.766086) and southwest through Mezcaltitan, Sinaloa (24.681667 -106.814444) until intersection with a paved road (24.624593 -106.827472) running between Culliacan and Cosala, Sinaloa via Presa El Comodero.

This road is in an area well known for active and continuous drug cultivation, and there is no signage for intersections, of which there are many. Though not as notorious as the unpaved area of Mexican Federal Highway 24, the travel on this route off the west side of the Sierras should be considered to be one in which unpredictable dangers could be encountered.
