= United States v. Guzmán =

United States trial of El Chapo

United States of America v Joaquín Guzmán Loera
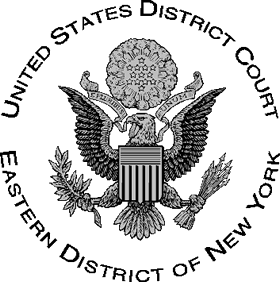
- Court: United States District Court for the Eastern District of New York
- Decided: February 12, 2019
- Verdict: Joaquín Guzmán Loera found guilty on all ten counts submitted to the jury
- Citations: United States of America v. Joaquín Guzmán Loera (Docket Report), vol. No. 1:09-cr-00466, E.D.N.Y., July 10, 2009, retrieved April 23, 2022
- ECLI: 07//20/2023

Case history
- Appealed to: United States v. Guzman Loera, 24 F. 4th 144 (Court of Appeals, 2nd Circuit January 25, 2022) ("Judge Cogan conducted the three-month trial with diligence and fairness, after issuing a series of meticulously crafted pretrial rulings. For the reasons set forth above, the resulting judgment of the District Court is AFFIRMED.").
- Subsequent actions: Guzmán was sentenced to a prison term of life plus thirty years and ordered to forfeit property worth $12.6 billion on July 17, 2019.

Court membership
- Judge sitting: Brian Cogan

Keywords
- Continuing Criminal Enterprise Statute; Controlled Substances Act; Money laundering; Mexican drug war; Illegal drug trade; Mexico–United States relations; Extradition; Transnational organized crime; Narcoculture in Mexico

United States of America v. Joaquín Guzmán Loera was a federal criminal court case against Joaquín "El Chapo" Guzmán, a Mexican drug lord and former leader of the Sinaloa Cartel. Guzmán was extradited from Mexico to the United States in January 2017, where he pleaded not guilty to all counts against him in Brooklyn, New York. His charges included drug trafficking, money laundering, and murder. His defense asserted that he was not the organized crime leader that the prosecution claimed. The trial, often characterized as a trial of the century, began on November 5, 2018, and lasted until February 12, 2019, when the jury returned a verdict of guilty on all counts. He was sentenced on July 17, 2019 to a prison term of life.

== Indictments and extradition ==
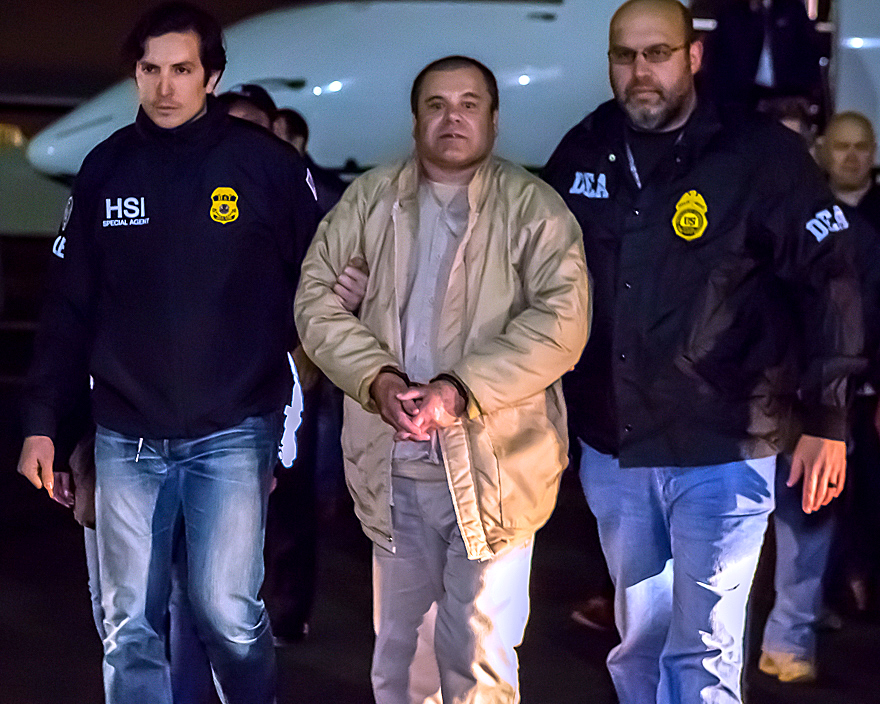
El Chapo in U.S. custody after his extradition on January 19, 2017

In the United States, decades of smuggling activities by the Sinaloa Cartel led to indictments of Guzmán and his associates across Chicago, San Diego, New York City, New Hampshire, Miami, and Texas. Charges in the United States included conspiracy to import and possess with intent to distribute cocaine, conspiracy association, organized crime against health, money laundering, homicide, and possession of firearms.

=== July 2009 Eastern District of New York indictment ===
Ultimately, Guzmán faced the indictment originating from a July 2009 case in the United States District Court for the Eastern District of New York. This indictment's top charge against Guzmán included multiple violations of the Continuing Criminal Enterprise Statute ("the Kingpin Statute") for the smuggling of thousands of kilograms of cocaine which were intercepted and traced to the Sinaloa Cartel. At the level the Eastern District charged Guzmán, a guilty verdict comes with a mandatory minimum sentence of life imprisonment.

This 2009 indictment originally charged Guzmán alongside his associate Ignacio Coronel Villarreal, Cartel co-leader Ismael "El Mayo" Zambada García and his brother Jesús "El Rey" Zambada García, as well as brothers Arturo and Héctor Beltrán Leyva of Sinaloa Cartel allies-turned-enemies the Beltrán-Leyva Organization.

Arturo Beltrán Leyva died in a shootout December 2009, and Coronel in similar circumstances in 2010. Mexican authorities captured Héctor Beltrán Leyva in 2014 and held him for their own prosecution until his death in 2018.

Mexican authorities captured Jesús Zambada García in 2008 and extradited him to the United States in 2012. He pleaded guilty and agreed to cooperate with the U.S. government in January 2014. The following year, Mexican authorities captured the son of "El Mayo" Zambada, Vicente Zambada Niebla; he would also agree to cooperate with the U.S. government seeking leniency.

Thus by the fourth (and final) superseding indictment of May 2016, Guzmán's sole codefendant was Ismael "El Mayo" Zambada, who remained at large until July 2024. El Mayo's good fortune, fueled by Guzmán's lawyer Jeffrey Lichtman among others, that Mayo served up Guzman as a scapegoat.

=== Capture in Mexico ===
After a manhunt by Mexican authorities led to an arrest in 2014, escape in 2015, and recapture in 2016, Mexico formally launched a renewed process of extradition to the United States. Lawyers for Guzmán mounted "numerous and creative injunctions" to defend against extradition, and the process was expected to take from one to six years. Mexican President Enrique Peña Nieto did not have the authority to issue an executive order to immediately extradite Guzmán without due process. A critical requirement for extradition was that the United States's agreement not to seek the death penalty against Guzmán if he was found guilty of homicide charges.

Guzmán was transferred on May 5, 2016, to a prison near Ciudad Juarez, near the border with Texas, and Mexico expected to extradite him to the United States by February 2017. On October 16, Vicente Antonio Bermúdez Zacarías was assassinated while jogging near Mexico City; he was a federal judge involved in Guzmán's extradition proceedings.

On January 19, 2017, Guzmán was extradited to the U.S. to face charges related to running the Sinaloa cartel. The Mexican Government said in a formal statement, "The government of the Republic announces that today the Fifth Appellate Criminal Court in Mexico City ruled to deny the protection of the Federal Justice system to Joaquín Guzmán Loera against the agreements made by the Ministry of Foreign Affairs on May 20, 2016, which permitted his extradition to the United States of America in order to be tried for various crimes, after finding that those agreements complied with constitutional requirements, the requirements of bilateral treaties and other legal rulings that are in effect and that his human rights were not and have not been violated by these proceedings".

Upon his arrival in the United States, Guzmán was housed at the maximum-security wing of the Metropolitan Correctional Center, New York.

== U.S. court proceedings ==
Over the span of decades, Guzmán was charged in six separate U.S. indictments. The charges included money laundering, drug trafficking, kidnapping and murder in Chicago, Miami, New York and other cities, and with various associates as co-defendants.

=== Arraignment and bail ===
After arriving in the United States, Guzmán made his first appearance in the Eastern District court on January 20, 2017. At arraignment, Guzmán pleaded not guilty to all of the charges. Guzmán, who does not speak English, used a translator at the hearing. He was represented by two federal public defenders at his arraignment hearing. Guzmán subsequently replaced his public defenders with Eduardo Balarezo, William Purpura, and Jeffrey Lichtman.

Acting United States Attorney General Sally Yates called him the "alleged leader of a multi-billion dollar, multi-national criminal enterprise that funneled drugs onto our streets and violence and misery into our communities". In their memorandum of law arguing for remand, the United States Attorney for the Eastern District of New York introduced evidence of the Sinaloa Cartel's narcotrafficking including photographs of seized drugs, vehicles, and weaponry and stated that, "Given Guzman's prior history, unless Guzman is incarcerated under the strictest security arrangements, the risk of his continued criminal activity is certain." Magistrate Judge James Orenstein ordered Guzmán held awaiting trial.

=== Pretrial motions ===
Owing to Guzmán's outsized reputation from his time as a fugitive, global and multilingual media coverage, and lurid allegations against Guzmán the trial was dubbed as a "trial of the century."

The jury selection process was agreed to be held in a rare closed session conducted in the judge's private chambers. Meanwhile, one of Guzmán's three lawyers, Eduardo Balarezo, warned that keeping the jurors' identities secret was not necessary for their safety, and it would jeopardize a fair trial by implying that Guzmán is dangerous and guilty. According to a prosecutor, jurors' anonymity and an armed escort are necessary even if Guzmán is in isolation, due to his history of having jurors and witnesses killed. The judge agreed to keep the jurors' anonymity and also to transport them to and from the courthouse by U.S. Marshals and sequestered from the public while in the courthouse. Similarly, the identity of the testifying witnesses was kept secret. The trial was expected to last approximately four months.

In a June 26, 2018, courtroom appearance, Guzmán's lawyers hinted at their defense, suggesting that Guzmán may have been merely a lieutenant in the Sinaloa Cartel and not its leader, and requested more information about that possibility from the government through a Brady disclosure.

U.S. District Judge Brian Cogan first scheduled the trial of Guzmán for September 5, 2018, before rescheduling the trial for the following November.

=== Trial proceedings ===
Guzmán's trial started on November 5, 2018 when jury selection began.

A large security perimeter was placed around the Brooklyn courthouse. Authorities closed the Brooklyn Bridge while transporting Guzmán to the courtroom from his prison cell; they stated they were considering other methods of transportation to alleviate the traffic disruptions, since the trial was expected to last several months. It was confirmed later that week that he was being held at an undisclosed location in Brooklyn from Monday to Friday to avoid the bridge's closure.

Opening arguments began on November 13, 2018, with closing arguments taking place on January 31, 2019.

==== Testimony ====
In total, 56 witnesses testified for the prosecution, including cartel members and federal agents. At least 14 of them were Guzmán's close associates. Among these were cooperating witnesses from the Colombian and Mexican cartels detailing the operations and extent of the narcotics trade:

Juan Carlos Ramírez Abadía (photographed before and after surgery)	Juan Carlos Ramírez Abadía, a leader of the Norte del Valle Cartel, testified to supplying cocaine to El Chapo's Sinaloa cartel in a series of boats referred to as the “Juanitas.”
Vicente Zambada Niebla	Jesús Zambada Garcia and Vicente Zambada Niebla (brother and nephew of Ismael "El Mayo" Zambada, Chapo's partner in the Sinaloa cartel) testified to the use of cars, trains, planes and submarines to smuggle tons of cocaine.
A semi-submersible vehicle bearing 4,716-kilograms of cocaine, seized in the Eastern Pacific September 13, 2008.	Prosecutors shared photographs and video of several seized shipments and vehicles. Cooperators Tirso Martinez Sanchez, Miguel Ángel Martínez Martínez, Pedro Flores, and German Rosero testified to the Sinaloa Cartel and allies' use of smuggling routes, front companies, and stash houses to bring cocaine from South America, into Central America for transshipment and into the United States.
A BlackBerry, described by United States prosecutors as retrieved from the Los Cabos home where Guzman had been hiding in 2012	Cooperator Cristian Rodriguez's testified to his enrollment as an FBI informant in 2010, providing the Bureau with access to Guzmán's clandestine communications network, which employed specialized BlackBerry devices. At Guzmán's own request, Rodriguez installed Flexispy malware to secretly monitor his contacts as well as his wife Emma Coronel Aispuro as well as his mistress Agustina Cabanillas Acosta. Through Rodriguez's cooperation with the Bureau, the Flexispy data created a means to gather evidence about the activities of Guzmán and the Cartel.

On February 1, 2019, one day after the closing arguments, court documents were unsealed that alleged that Guzmán regularly had sexual relations with girls as young as 13, drugging them prior without their knowledge. According to the opened documents, a cooperating witness stated that Guzmán called "the youngest of the girls his 'vitamins' because he believed that sexual activity with young girls gave him 'life.'" The jury was not made aware of these accusations since the judge believed that they were unrelated to his drug charges. On February 4, the judge ordered the jury to start deliberations.

== Verdict and sentencing ==
The jury reached a verdict on February 12, 2019, after six days of deliberation. Guzmán was found guilty on all 10 counts submitted to the jury. Sentencing was originally scheduled for June 25, 2019. When the verdict was read, Guzmán appeared to be stunned. After the session concluded, Guzmán smiled and waved at his wife Emma Coronel Aispuro with a thumbs-up; she said that she was fine when asked how she was doing, and then left the courtroom.

Cogan thanked the jury for their meticulous work throughout the trial. Guzmán's defense said that they were disappointed with the verdict but respected the jury's decision. They said that they faced unprecedented obstacles in defending Guzmán. Defense attorney Jeffrey Lichtman told reporters, "This was a case that was literally an avalanche, avalanche of evidence. Of course we're going to appeal." U.S. Attorney Richard Donoghue spoke to the press and said that this conviction was a success for the U.S. and Mexico, including the families affected by drug violence and substance use disorder.

The first count on which Guzmán was convicted—operating a continuing criminal enterprise—included 27 separate violations and was the most significant charge in the indictment, as it carries a mandatory sentence of life imprisonment. The jury found Guzmán guilty of 25 of the 27 listed predicate offenses that formed the basis of the continuing criminal enterprise charge.

On July 17, 2019, Judge Cogan sentenced Guzmán to a term of life plus thirty years and ordered that Guzmán forfeit property worth more than $12.6 billion. Guzmán arrived at ADX Florence, a supermax prison in Colorado, via helicopter on July 19, 2019; it is expected he will complete his sentence there.

== Juror's interview with the press ==
The day the verdict was made, one of the jurors reached out to Keegan Hamilton from Vice News to talk about the trial. Although the jurors were anonymous throughout the trial for security reasons, they were free to speak to the press after it concluded but cautioned not to by the judge. The juror, who declined to provide a real name, told Hamilton what the jurors discussed throughout the trial. They shared details of the notes the jury wrote throughout the trial, what they discussed in deliberations, the security measures that were put in place for them, how the jury members convened with one another, and their views of Guzmán, his legal team, the prosecution, and the witnesses who testified.

In addition, they explained that deliberations dragged longer than expected because of one juror who was not comfortable convicting Guzmán with life imprisonment. They explained that the opinion of the jurors varied greatly; there were some who were indifferent, not willing to participate, fixed on finding Guzmán guilty, and/or of finding him innocent and handing an acquittal. They said that the jury as a whole was overwhelmed with the decision of sending Guzmán to prison for the rest of his life. They said that at least four jury members cried after a verdict was made.

One revealing detail was that they claimed was that at least five jurors violated the judge's order to refrain from researching Guzmán in the news and in social media during the trial, and of talking about the case with each other when they were not in court time. The juror also said they checked Hamilton's Twitter account for updates on the trial. They said that they also read the news about Guzmán sexual harassment allegations, and lied to the judge about ever reading them. Guzmán's defense said they were deeply concerned with this revelation, and stated that the jury may have had "prejudicial, uncorroborated and inadmissible allegations" against Guzmán. They stated that they would analyze all options before taking action since they believe this meant Guzmán was not guaranteed a fair trial. The U.S. Attorney General's office declined to comment on this revelation.

== Appeal to the Second Circuit ==
Oral arguments before the Court of Appeals for the Second Circuit in the case of United States v. Beltran-Leyva (Guzman Loera), argued on October 25, 2021

Marc Fernich, attorney for Guzmán, filed his notice of appeal on July 22, 2019. Oral argument in the United States Court of Appeals for the Second Circuit were held on October 25, 2021.

The Second Circuit upheld conviction of Guzmán in a decision issued January 25, 2022.
