= Jeffrey Lichtman =

American lawyer

- Born: June 5, 1965 (age 61); Newark, New Jersey, U.S.
- Education: Emory University (BA); Duke University (JD)
- Occupation: Lawyer
- Website: www.jeffreylichtman.com

Jeffrey Harris Lichtman (born June 5, 1965) is a New York-based criminal defense lawyer.

== Early life and education ==
Jeffrey Lichtman was born on June 5, 1965, in Newark, New Jersey, United States. He grew up in Clark, New Jersey. He attended Emory University for his bachelor's and graduated in 1987. He then went to Duke University School of Law and graduated in 1990. He opened his own law firm in 1999.

== Career ==
Lichtman's law offices are located in midtown Manhattan. He represented John Gotti Jr., and secured a dismissal of three charges of murder conspiracy, an acquittal on a $25 million securities fraud charge, and a hung jury on every remaining count brought against him. Some of his other clients include rappers The Game (who had his case dismissed) and Fat Joe.

In 2010, Lichtman's client—who was convicted of multiple counts of sexual assault—had his 27-year sentence vacated, and was released after Lichtman successfully argued that trial counsel was ineffective.

In 2011, Lichtman achieved an acquittal after trial for WPIX television reporter Vince DeMentri, on assault charges.

From 2011 to 2013, Lichtman hosted a radio talk show on AM 970 The Answer during the drive time.

In 2018, Lichtman represented Khari Noerdlinger, son of former New York City Hall aide Rachel Noerdlinger, on charges including manslaughter. After discovering that evidence was withheld which exonerated his client, the charges were dropped.

In 2018, he was hired by suspected Mexican drug lord Joaquín "El Chapo" Guzmán to represent him in his federal trial in Brooklyn, which lasted from November 2018 to February 2019. Guzmán was found guilty of all 10 counts in February 2019.

In 2021, Lichtman was hired by Emma Coronel Aispuro, the wife of Joaquín "El Chapo" Guzmán in connection with her indictment in federal court in the District of Columbia. She ultimately received a three year sentence for drug trafficking and money laundering.

In 2022, Lichtman was hired as counsel in Bronx rapper Kay Flock's murder case.

== Known Jeffrey Lichtman's clients ==
- John Gotti Jr., American mobster, former acting boss of Gambino Crime Family and son of John Gotti
- The Game, American West Coast rapper
- Fat Joe, American East Coast rapper
- Vince DeMentri, American broadcast journalist
- Joaquín "El Chapo" Guzmán, Mexican drug lord and one of the founders of the Sinaloa Cartel (Mexico's most powerful drug cartel). He also has representated his following family members:
  - Emma Coronel Aispuro, wife
  - Ovidio Guzmán López, son
  - Joaquín Guzmán López, son
- Kay Flock, American drill rapper
- Andrew "Andy Mush" Russo, former acting boss and high-ranking member of the Colombo crime family

== See also ==
- United States of America v. Joaquín Guzmán Loera
