= Aispuro =

Aispuro is a Basque surname. Notable people with the surname include:

- Emma Coronel Aispuro (born 1989), U.S.-born Mexican former teenage beauty queen
- José Rosas Aispuro (born 1961), Mexican lawyer and politician
