= Domingo Arrieta León =

Mexican general

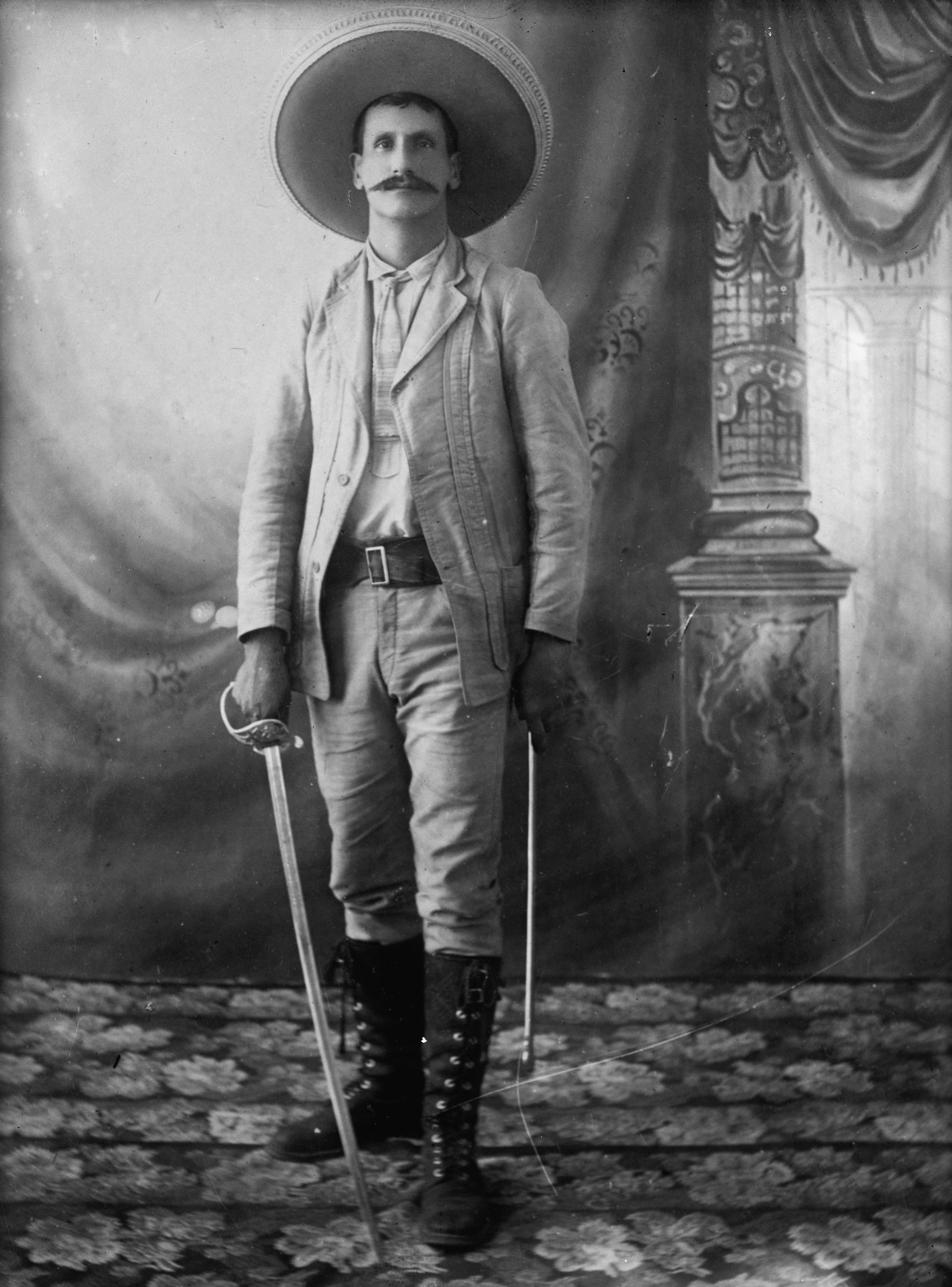
- Domingo Arrieta Leòn in 1915
- Born: August 4, 1874; Vascogil in Canelas, Durango
- Died: November 18, 1962 (aged 88); Durango, Durango
- Military career
- Allegiance: Constitutional Army; Mexican Army
- Service years: 1913–1920 (CA); 1920–1940 (MA)
- Rank: general (CA); General (MA)
- Commands: Auxiliary Cavalry Regiment “Guadalupe Victoria”
- Conflicts: Mexican Revolution; Capture of Culiacán; Battle of Torreón; Capture of Zacatecas
- Other work: Governor of Durango, Federal Mexican Senator

Domingo Arrieta León (August 4, 1874 – November 18, 1962) was a Mexican general and statesman who fought in the Mexican Revolution of 1910 and was later elected the governor of Durango State, Mexico.

== Early life ==
Arrieta León was born in Canelas, in the Mexican state of Durango on August 4, 1874. He was the son of Teófilo Arrieta and Soledad León Clark. He worked as a ranchero in his youth, and earned enough to set up as an entrepreneur muleskinner, transporting goods by mule around the region. Although illiterate, Arrieta León was said to have an excellent memory. His extensive travels provided him with an intimate knowledge of the northwest region of Durango, particularly the Sierra Madre Occidental mountain range.

During this time, Arrieta León also became witness to the exploitation of miners, day laborers, and peasant farmers by landowners in the area. The remoteness of the area made it difficult for the exploited persons to escape their situation or communicate about it.

== Revolutionary beginnings ==
Porfirio Díaz, then the president of Mexico, was perceived as benefiting from this exploitative system, and in 1910, his opponent Francisco I. Madero called for an armed rebellion with the publication of the Plan of San Luis Potosí. This rebellion would escalate into the Mexican Revolution. Arrieta León and his nine brothers, including Mariano Arrieta León and Eduardo Arrieta León, assembled an improvised army in order to fight in the rebellion as maderistas, or supporters of Madero.

On the appointed date, November 20, 1910, Arrieta León and his army, supported by the forces of Conrado Antuna and Ramon Iturbe rose up at Mesa de Guadalupe in Carnelas.

== First phase of the revolution: 1910-1911 ==
Between December 1910 and May 1911, Arrieta León and his brothers led the rebel groups in their area to seize towns and mines in Durango, culminating in the seizure of the town of Santiago Papasquiaro on March 29, 1911.

In May 1911, Arrieta León's army, by then numbering around 4,000 men, took the city of Durango, the capital of the state. Shortly after, the peace treaty of Ciudad Juarez was signed, officially ending the conflict between the forces of Díaz and Madero. Arrieta León was granted the rank of colonel as a reward and returned to the mountains with his brothers.

== Securing power: 1913-1917 ==
By 1913, Victoriano Huerta had seized power from Madero. Venustiano Carranza, leader of the Constitutional Army, proclaimed the Plan of Guadalupe on March 26, 1913, calling for armed opposition to Huerta. As a result, former maderistas rose up to oppose him, including Arrieta León, his brother Mariano Arrieta León, and their army. In April 1913, the Arrieta brothers' army was besieging the city of Durango, but were forced to withdraw after the arrival of the forces of Cheché Campos. Arrieta León fell back to Canatlán, and in May, he defeated the Campos forces there.

After Campos' defeat, the revolutionaries were able to take the city of Durango in July 1913. Arrieta León forced civilian governor Pastor Rouiax to withdraw, declaring his forces to be the provisional government in the region. By the end of the summer of 1914, Arrieta León and his brothers commanded nearly 5,000 men and had complete control of the local government.

Arrieta León supported General Pancho Villa in capturing Torreon in April 1914, and later participated in the Battle of Zacatecas supporting the forces of General Panfilo Natera. In September of the same year, after the breakdown between Villa and Carranza, Arrieta León remained a supporter of Carranza.

In 1917, Arrieta León was elected governor of Durango, winning 7,020 votes to his opponent Miguel Laveaga's 2,454.

== Retirement and death ==
After the death of Venustiano Carranza, Arrieta León was pardoned and retired. He died on November 18, 1962.

== Works cited ==
- Cumberland, Charles C. (1952). 'Mexican Revolution: Genesis Under Madero. Austin: University of Texas Press.
- Knight, Alan (1990). The Mexican Revolution: Counter-revolution and reconstruction. University of Nebraska Press. ISBN 0803277717.
