= Carlos Manuel Hoo Ramírez =

Drug lord in Mexico

- Born: 15 October 1978 (age 47); Los Mochis, Sinaloa, Mexico
- Other name: El Cóndor
- Organization: Sinaloa Cartel

Carlos Manuel Hoo Ramírez
- Allegiance: Mexico
- Branch: Mexican Army
- Service years: 1997 - 2000

Carlos Manuel Hoo Ramírez (born 15 October 1978), commonly referred to by his alias El Cóndor, is a former Mexican Special Forces commando and imprisoned high-ranking member of the Sinaloa Cartel, a drug trafficking organization. He was the alleged communications chief and personal bodyguard of Joaquín "El Chapo" Guzmán, once considered Mexico's most-wanted drug lord. On 22 February 2014, he was arrested by the Mexican Navy along with Guzmán at a beach resort area in Mazatlán, Sinaloa.

== Early life and career ==
Carlos Manuel Hoo Ramírez, also known by his alias "El Cóndor", was born in Los Mochis, Sinaloa, Mexico on 15 October 1978. On 1 June 1997, when he was eighteen years old, he enlisted in the Mexican Armed Forces as an infantry soldier in the Mexican Army. At that time, Hoo Ramírez was single, had a middle school degree, and was already in the workforce as a laborer. Following a medical and psychological entrance exam, he was accepted into the military. During his tenure in the Army, he was relocated three times: on 1 November 1998, 16 December 1998, and on 16 March 1999. He was also a member of the 209 Grupo Aeromovil de Fuerzas Especiales (GAFEs), an elite special forces unit of the Army, with their center of operations in Culiacán, Sinaloa. As a special forces soldier, Hoo Ramírez was trained in the jungles and learnt several survival skills in extreme environments, patrolling protocols, basic and advance navigation skills, about the flora and fauna in combat environments, among other things. By the end of the training session, the special soldiers were required to be able to swim more than 1,300 m (4,265 ft) with their uniforms, weapon, and equipment. After more than three years, however, Hoo Ramírez applied to be discharged from the Army on 1 September 2000, citing that there were family issues that required his full attention.

An anonymous source from the Mexican Armed Forces confirmed that Hoo Ramírez was recruited by the Sinaloa Cartel, a Mexican drug trafficking organization, shortly after its leader Joaquín "El Chapo" Guzmán escaped from prison on 19 January 2001. Guzmán had a preference for recruiting former members of the Mexican Armed Forces; given Hoo Ramírez's military background, he was an ideal candidate for the drug lord's repertoire, and quickly rose in the cartel's ranks as one of the men in his inner circle. By 2010–2011, Hoo Ramírez grew closer to Guzmán and started to gain his trust. He was considered well-versed with high-tech, and was the alleged communication's chief of Guzmán. During his three years on the job, Hoo Ramírez became one of Guzmán's most trusted lieutenants, and worked as his personal assistant and bodyguard.

== Manhunt of Guzmán ==
During his time on the run, Guzmán became the top leader of the Sinaloa Cartel and Mexico's most-wanted drug lord. He dodged law enforcement efforts to re-arrest him for more than thirteen years. However, by late 2013 and early 2014, authorities began to arrest several high-ranking enforcers in the cartel and got closer to Guzmán's whereabouts. On 17 February 2014, Guzmán and Hoo Ramírez were tracked down by Mexican law enforcement at a security house in Libertad neighborhood in Culiacán after they intercepted the drug lord's cellphone signal. When the Mexican Navy tried to break down the entrance door of the property, they discovered that the door was steel-reinforced; when they finally gained access to the premises, the house was empty. The soldiers made their way to every room and soon discovered that the bathtub in the restroom was raised with a hydraulic lift and that there was a secret tunnel underneath it that connected to the city's sewage system. They made their way into the tunnel and attempted to follow Guzmán, but both of them had a ten-minute start advantage. After more than a mile in pursuit, the soldiers reached a dead end while Hoo Ramírez and Guzmán managed to escape. A day before this incident, U.S. authorities successfully tracked down the signal of Hoo Ramírez's cellphone, and managed to use that information to locate other high-ranking members of the Sinaloa Cartel, in addition to identifying a stash house owned by the cartel.

After Hoo Ramírez and Guzmán managed to lose their tail from law enforcement, they escaped from the sewage system through a storm drain outside of Culiacán, where they were picked up by a Sinaloa Cartel associate and then transferred to another vehicle. That same day, Mexican authorities raided the domicile of Hoo Ramírez in Culiacán but no one was inside the house when the raid took place. On 20 February 2014, Hoo Ramírez turned on his cellphone to contact one of his aides, and authorities tracked down the signal to Mazatlán, Sinaloa. Thinking that Guzmán had already retreated to one of his hideouts in the mountains, they decided to move on to apprehend Hoo Ramírez in efforts to track down the drug lord's inner circle even more.

=== Arrest and imprisonment ===
The signal of Hoo Ramírez's cellphone took authorities to Hotel Miramar, a fourteen story condominium complex at a beach resort area in Mazatlán. From the registration records, they discovered that two apartments there had been rented the previous day, on the fourth and sixth floors. When the soldiers of the Mexican Navy made their way to the fourth floor, they saw Hoo Ramírez guarding the entrance door of Apartment #401 with an AK-47 assault rifle. Seeing that he stood no chance against them, Hoo Ramírez surrendered and was arrested. The soldiers then entered the apartment, located Guzmán in one of the bedrooms, and proceeded to apprehend him as well. By 6:40 a.m. on 22 February 2014, the Mexican Navy had arrested Hoo Ramírez and Guzmán without a single shot fired.

Following his arrest, Hoo Ramírez was transferred to the federal installations of SEIDO, Mexico's anti-organized crime investigatory agency, where he gave his statement and was interrogated by law enforcement. He remained at the SEIDO installations for three days. On 26 February 2014, he was transferred by the Procuraduría General de la República (PGR) to the Federal Social Readaptation Center No. 1 (sometimes referred to simply as "Altiplano"), a maximum-security prison in Almoloya de Juárez, State of Mexico, accused of violating Mexico's Federal Law of Firearms and Explosives. That day, he appeared before a federal judge in Toluca to face the charges against him. At the moment of his arrest, he had 60 cartridges, an assault rifle, and a grenade-launcher. On 7 March 2014, a federal judge in the State of Mexico set his trial to motion and formally charged him for his alleged violations of Mexican law.

On 22 February 2015, Hoo Ramírez was granted a writ of amparo (effectively equivalent to an injunction) by a federal court after his defense claimed that authorities did not follow the judicial protocol accordingly after his client was arrested. The purpose of the injunction was to work for the removal of Hoo Ramírez's formal charges.

== See also ==
- Mexican drug war
