= Inés Coronel Barreras =

Mexican drug lord

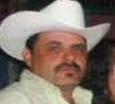
- Born: 21 January 1968 (age 58); Canelas, Durango, Mexico
- Other names: El Uno; El Suegro
- Organization: Sinaloa Cartel
- Criminal charges: Drug trafficking Illegal possession of firearms
- Spouse: Blanca Estela Aispuro Aispuro
- Children: Emma Coronel Aispuro
- Relatives: Joaquín "El Chapo" Guzmán (son-in-law); Ignacio Coronel Villarreal

Inés Coronel Barreras (born 21 January 1968) is a Mexican convicted drug lord and former high-ranking leader of the Sinaloa Cartel, a criminal group based in Sinaloa. He is the father-in-law of Joaquín "El Chapo" Guzmán, the former leader of the cartel and once considered Mexico's most-wanted man. Coronel Barreras was arrested by Mexican security forces in Agua Prieta, Sonora on 30 April 2013. He was sentenced to 10 years in prison on 28 April 2017 for drug trafficking and illegal possession of firearms.

== Early life and career ==
Inés Coronel Barreras was born on 21 January 1968 in Canelas, Durango, Mexico. He has also been known by the nicknames "El Uno" (The One) and "El Suegro" (The Father-in-Law). His wife is Blanca Estela Aispuro Aispuro, and his daughter, Emma Coronel Aispuro, is married to Joaquín "El Chapo" Guzmán, the former leader of the Sinaloa Cartel and once Mexico's most-wanted drug lord. Coronel Barreras was also related to Ignacio "Nacho" Coronel Villarreal, a former Sinaloa Cartel chief who was killed in a firefight with Mexican security forces in 2010. Coronel Barreras was officially a cattle rancher in the rural community of La Angostura, Canelas, Durango. However, people from the local area stated that he reportedly cultivated marijuana and opium poppies.

On 9 January 2013, the United States Department of the Treasury sanctioned Coronel Barreras under the Foreign Narcotics Kingpin Designation Act (sometimes referred to simply as the "Kingpin Act"), for his involvement with the Sinaloa Cartel's illicit activities and coordinating drug trafficking operations for Guzmán. The designation also sanctioned Damaso López Núñez (alias "El Licenciado"), another Sinaloa Cartel chief who worked directly with Guzmán. Under the Kingpin Act, the Office of Foreign Assets Control (OFAC) virtually froze all the assets Coronel Barreras had in the U.S. and prohibited U.S. citizens from doing any kind of business with him.

His area of operations was in Durango and Sonora, particularly in the municipalities of Agua Prieta, San Luis Río Colorado, and Cananea, where he coordinated marijuana plantations and drug trafficking shipments through the U.S.-Mexico border in Arizona.

== Arrest ==
On 30 April 2013, the Mexican Federal Police arrested Coronel Barreras, his son Inés Omar Coronel Aispuro, and three other people at a warehouse in Agua Prieta, Sonora without a single shot fired. The authorities seized four automatic rifles, a handgun, and at least 550 pounds (250 kilograms) of cannabis at the scene. At the time of his arrest, the authorities alleged that Coronel Barreras coordinated drug trafficking shipments for the Sinaloa Cartel from Mexico through the Arizona border crossing, and that he played an important role in the overall operations of Guzmán.

That afternoon, he was flown from Sonora to the Mexico City International Airport in a Boeing 727 owned by the Federal Police. He was then transferred to the SEIDO, Mexico's anti-organized crime investigatory agency, for his legal declaration. Coronel Barreras was later imprisoned at a federal penitentiary in Tamaulipas state; he was again transferred, to a prison in Sinaloa, in December 2013.

=== Prison break rumors ===
On 26 May 2014, local media outlets reported that Coronel Barreras had escaped from the penitentiary in Culiacán, Sinaloa with several other inmates. The Mexican government disputed this story through Twitter, stating that the story was false and that he was imprisoned at the Federal Social Readaptation Center No. 11, a maximum-security prison in Hermosillo, Sonora. The government confirmed, however, that three inmates escaped from the prison in Culiacán: Ramón Ruiz Ojeda, Adrián Campos Hernández, and Adelmo Niebla González (alias "El Señor"), a top drug trafficker for the Sinaloa Cartel and former business partner of Guzmán.

=== Conviction ===
On April 28, 2017, a federal judge in Sonora found Coronel Barreras guilty of marijuana trafficking and for being in possession of military-exclusive firearms. He was sentenced to 10 years, 5 months, and 9 days in prison, and was ordered to forfeit $MXN15,930. The sentencing also extended to his son, who was convicted of marijuana trafficking and given 10 years and 3 months, and ordered to forfeit $MXN15,542.

== See also ==
- Mexican drug war
