= Topia =

City in the Mexican state of Durango

- Municipal seat and city
- Location within Durango Location within Mexico
- Coordinates: 25°13′N 106°34′W
- Country: Mexico
- State: Durango
- Municipality: Topia

Population (2010)
  - Total: 2,051
- Time zone: UTC-6 (Central)

Topia is a city and seat of the municipality of Topia, in the state of Durango, north-western Mexico. As of 2010, the town of Topia had a population of 2,051.

== Geography ==
=== Climate ===
Climate data for Topia (1951–2010)
Month	Jan	Feb	Mar	Apr	May	Jun	Jul	Aug	Sep	Oct	Nov	Dec	Year
Record high °C (°F)	29.5 (85.1)	30.5 (86.9)	37.5 (99.5)	35.5 (95.9)	34.5 (94.1)	38.5 (101.3)	35.0 (95.0)	32.0 (89.6)	38.0 (100.4)	31.5 (88.7)	30.5 (86.9)	29.5 (85.1)	38.5 (101.3)
Mean daily maximum °C (°F)	18.4 (65.1)	19.9 (67.8)	22.0 (71.6)	25.1 (77.2)	27.3 (81.1)	27.8 (82.0)	24.7 (76.5)	24.7 (76.5)	24.7 (76.5)	24.1 (75.4)	22.0 (71.6)	19.7 (67.5)	23.4 (74.1)
Daily mean °C (°F)	13.0 (55.4)	13.8 (56.8)	15.4 (59.7)	18.2 (64.8)	20.5 (68.9)	21.7 (71.1)	20.0 (68.0)	20.0 (68.0)	20.1 (68.2)	18.8 (65.8)	16.3 (61.3)	14.1 (57.4)	17.7 (63.9)
Mean daily minimum °C (°F)	7.5 (45.5)	7.7 (45.9)	8.9 (48.0)	11.4 (52.5)	13.7 (56.7)	15.6 (60.1)	15.4 (59.7)	15.4 (59.7)	15.4 (59.7)	13.4 (56.1)	10.5 (50.9)	8.6 (47.5)	12.0 (53.6)
Record low °C (°F)	−2.0 (28.4)	0.0 (32.0)	0.0 (32.0)	2.0 (35.6)	6.5 (43.7)	6.5 (43.7)	8.0 (46.4)	4.0 (39.2)	8.0 (46.4)	6.0 (42.8)	0.0 (32.0)	−2.0 (28.4)	−2.0 (28.4)
Average precipitation mm (inches)	110.7 (4.36)	40.3 (1.59)	26.8 (1.06)	11.7 (0.46)	14.8 (0.58)	106.2 (4.18)	277.2 (10.91)	228.0 (8.98)	160.4 (6.31)	95.2 (3.75)	47.7 (1.88)	104.5 (4.11)	1,223.5 (48.17)
Average precipitation days (≥ 0.1 mm)	4.9	2.5	1.7	1.4	1.8	10.4	24.0	21.6	14.1	6.2	2.7	4.8	96.1
Source: Servicio Meteorologico Nacional
