= Ignacio Coronel Villarreal =

Mexican drug lord (1954–2010)

- Born: 1 February 1954; Canelas, Durango, Mexico
- Died: 29 July 2010 (aged 56); Zapopan, Jalisco, Mexico
- Cause of death: Gunshot wound to the head
- Other names: "King of Crystal" "El Nacho" "El Coronel"; Ignacio Valdés Urrutia
- Employer(s): Sinaloa Cartel Founder, Juarez Cartel
- Partner(s): Joaquín Guzmán, Ismael Zambada García, Juan José Esparragoza Moreno
- Relatives: Inés Coronel Barreras, Emma Coronel Aispuro

Ignacio "Nacho" Coronel Villarreal (1 February 1954 – 29 July 2010) was a Mexican suspected drug lord and a founder of the Sinaloa Cartel, a criminal group based in Sinaloa. He worked alongside Joaquín "El Chapo" Guzmán, Mexico's most-wanted drug lord. His stronghold was Jalisco.

== Biography ==
In the 1980s, Coronel began his criminal career as the leader of the Juarez Cartel in the state of Nayarit. He worked at that time under the shadow of Amado Carrillo Fuentes "the Lord of The Skies" and Eduardo González Quitarte "El Flaco". After the death of Carrillo Fuentes, Coronel, Juan Jose Esparragoza Moreno "El Azul" and Ismael "El Mayo" Zambada broke away from the Juarez cartel and joined the Sinaloa cartel, which regained its status as Mexico's top cartel in 2001 after El Chapo Guzman's escape from prison in Puente Grande, Jalisco. At that time Coronel was associated with Luis Valencia Valencia, head of the cartel del Milenio and the Beltran Leyva brothers. Years later, when the Beltran Leyva brothers broke away from Guzman, Coronel stood firmly with the Sinaloa cartel. Coronel was responsible for moving multi-ton quantities of cocaine via fishing vessels from Colombia to Mexico and on to the United States states of Texas and Arizona during the early 2000s. His influence and operations penetrated throughout the United States, Mexico, and several other European, Central American, and South American countries. In Mexico, he was known as the "King of Crystal" for his domination of crystal methamphetamine production and trafficking.

Both the governments of the United States and Mexico had an outstanding arrest warrant for Coronel; in addition, the United States Department of State was offering a reward of up to US$5 million for information leading to his capture.

== Kingpin Act sanction ==
On 1 June 2005, the United States Department of the Treasury sanctioned Coronel under the Foreign Narcotics Kingpin Designation Act (sometimes referred to simply as the "Kingpin Act"), for his involvement in drug trafficking along with seven other international criminals and one entity. The act prohibited U.S. citizens and companies from doing any kind of business activity with him, and virtually froze all his assets in the U.S.

== Death ==
Coronel was killed on 29 July 2010 in Zapopan, Jalisco, during a shootout with the Mexican Army. During the raid, Coronel killed a soldier and wounded another. Sometime during the shootout, Coronel was fatally shot in the head, which killed him instantly. A statement from the federal Attorney General's Office says soldiers found jewelry, luxury watches, guns, two hand grenades, three vehicles, and US$7 million in cash in the house where Coronel was killed.

== Personal life ==
On 3 April 2010, alleged gunmen of Los Zetas abducted and killed Coronel's son, Alejandro Coronel (aged 16), in Bahía de Banderas, Nayarit. Coronel sought vengeance and responded three days later by sending over 100 of his henchmen to kidnap and kill 14 people.

A few days after Coronel was killed on 29 July 2010, his nephew Mario Carrasco Coronel ("El Gallo") was killed by the special forces of the Mexican Army in Guadalajara, Jalisco. Mario reportedly aided his uncle Ignacio directly in the cartel activities and was his alleged successor.

His niece, Emma Coronel, is married to Joaquín "El Chapo" Guzmán, formerly Mexico's most-wanted drug lord. Emma is the third or fourth wife of Guzmán, who at one time was a partner of Coronel.

In January 2010, several members of the Coronel clan were arrested: Ernesto Coronel Peña, Juan Jaime Coronel, Juan Ernesto Coronel Herrera, and Gael Carbel Aldana. His cousin José Ángel Coronel Carrasco ("El Changel") was arrested by Mexican soldiers in Culiacán on 20 January 2013. He was the successor of Coronel Villarreal and top leader of La Corona Cartel, a Sinaloa Cartel-affiliated gang founded between late 2012 and early 2013.

His nephew and regional cartel leader in Durango, Humberto Rodríguez Coronel ("El Canelo"), was arrested by the Navy on 24 March 2013. His nephew Martín Beltrán Coronel (alias "El Águila") was released from prison on 24 September 2014.

== See also ==
- Mexican drug war
- Mérida Initiative
- List of Mexico's 37 most-wanted drug lords
