= Canelas, Durango =

Town in the Mexican state of Durango

Canelas
- Municipal seat and city
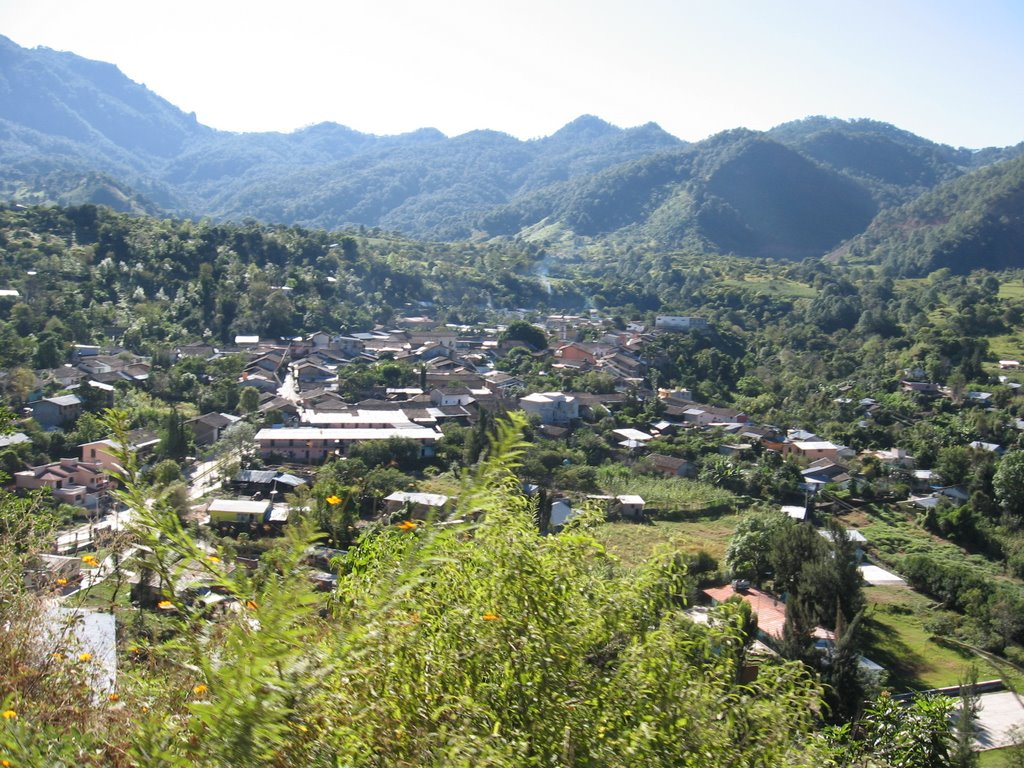
- Canelas, Durango

- Location in Mexico
- Coordinates: 25°06′N 106°34′W
- Country: Mexico
- State: Durango
- Municipality: Canelas
- Elevation: 1,369 m (4,491 ft)

Population (2010)
  - Total: 734
- Time zone: UTC-6 (Central Standard Time)

Canelas is a town and seat of the municipality of Canelas, in the state of Durango, northwestern Mexico. Canelas is also known for a wedding that took place, that of the famous Mexican drug lord Joaquín Guzmán Loera and Emma Coronel Aispuro. Reports indicate that this wedding took place in 2007 in Canelas. As of 2010, the town had a population of 734.

== Geography ==
Canelas is located in the Sierra Madre Occidental. It is surrounded by pine trees. Its location gives Canelas humid sub-tropical weather. Many people have benefited from the natural resources of the forest and are involved in logging.

== Notable people ==
- Domingo Arrieta León (1874-1962), Mexican general and statesman
- Ignacio Coronel Villarreal, known as Nacho Coronel (1954-2010), Mexican drug lord and one of the founders of the Sinaloa Cartel
- Inés Coronel Barreras (born 1968), Mexican drug lord, high-ranking leader of Sinaloa Cartel and the father of Emma Coronel Aispuro, El Chapo's wife
