= Canelas Municipality =

Municipality in the Mexican state of Durango

Canelas
- Municipality
- Municipality of Canelas in Durango
- Coordinates: 25°07′N 106°33′W
- Country: Mexico
- State: Durango
- Municipal seat: Canelas

Area
  - Total: 683.4 km^{2} (263.9 sq mi)

Population (2015)
  - Total: 4,683
- Time zone: UTC-6 (Zona Centro)

Canelas is a municipality in the Mexican state of Durango. The municipal seat lies at Canelas. The municipality covers an area of 683.4 km^{2}.

As of 2015, the municipality had a total population of 4,683. It is located in the Sierra Madre Occidental.

== Settlements ==
Canelas has some 70 small villages and ranches. Some of these locations have sawmills and produce wood. This region of Durango has a variety of minerals. These two natural resources provide many people with jobs in Canelas.

Location	Population
Municipality	4,683
Canelas	734
La Tembladora De Camellones	202
El Salto De Camellones	186
La Yerbabuena	166
