= Topia Municipality =

Municipality in the Mexican state of Durango

Topia
- Municipality
- Municipality of Topia in Durango

- Location in Mexico
- Coordinates: 25°12′43″N 106°34′15″W
- Country: Mexico
- State: Durango
- Municipal seat: Topia

Area
  - Total: 1,617.8 km^{2} (624.6 sq mi)

Population (2010)
  - Total: 8,581
  - Density: 5.304/km^{2} (13.74/sq mi)
- Time zone: UTC-6 (Zona Centro)

Topia is a municipality in the Mexican state of Durango. The municipal seat lies at Topia. The municipality covers an area of 1,617.8 km^{2}.

As of 2010, the municipality had a total population of 8,581, up from 7,984 as of 2005.

As of 2010, the town of Topia had a population of 2,051. Other than the town of Topia, the municipality had 318 localities, none of which had a population over 1,000.
