= Emma Coronel Aispuro =

American born, Mexican former teenage beauty queen (born 1989)

- Born: Emma Modesta Coronel Aispuro; July 2, 1989 (age 37); San Francisco, California, U.S.
- Occupation: Beauty pageant contestant
- Spouse: Joaquín Guzmán (m. 2007)
- Children: 2
- Parent: Inés Coronel Barreras
- Relatives: Ignacio Coronel Villarreal

Emma Modesta Coronel Aispuro (Spanish: [ˈema moˈðesta koɾoˈnel ajsˈpuɾo]; born July 2, 1989) is an American former teenage beauty queen. She is the wife of Joaquín "El Chapo" Guzmán, considered Mexico's most-wanted drug lord until he was imprisoned for life. In February 2021, she was arrested in the United States on charges of conspiracy to unlawfully import and distribute illegal drugs, money laundering, and transacting business with a significant foreign narcotics trafficker designated under the Foreign Narcotics Kingpin Designation Act. Coronel served a three-year prison sentence and was released in September 2023.

== Early life ==
Emma Modesta Coronel was born July 2, 1989, near San Francisco, California, US, to Blanca Estela Aispuro Aispuro and Inés Coronel Barreras, a cattle rancher and deputy of Guzmán who was sanctioned by the United States Department of the Treasury under the Foreign Narcotics Kingpin designation. She grew up in the remote Durango village of La Angostura.

Coronel entered the 2007 Coffee and Guava Festival beauty pageant in Canelas, Durango, Mexico. Each contestant was required to host a party in honor of her candidacy; Coronel held hers on Three Kings Day. In this event, Coronel reportedly met Joaquín "El Chapo" Guzmán, who traveled to Canelas to meet her. Both of them reportedly agreed to marry that day. Their wedding was held on July 2, 2007 in La Angostura. (Note: In an interview conducted by the Mexican magazine Proceso in 2010, Guzmán's associate Ismael "El Mayo" Zambada claimed that Guzmán never married Coronel.)

== Arrest, incarceration, plea deal and prison sentence ==
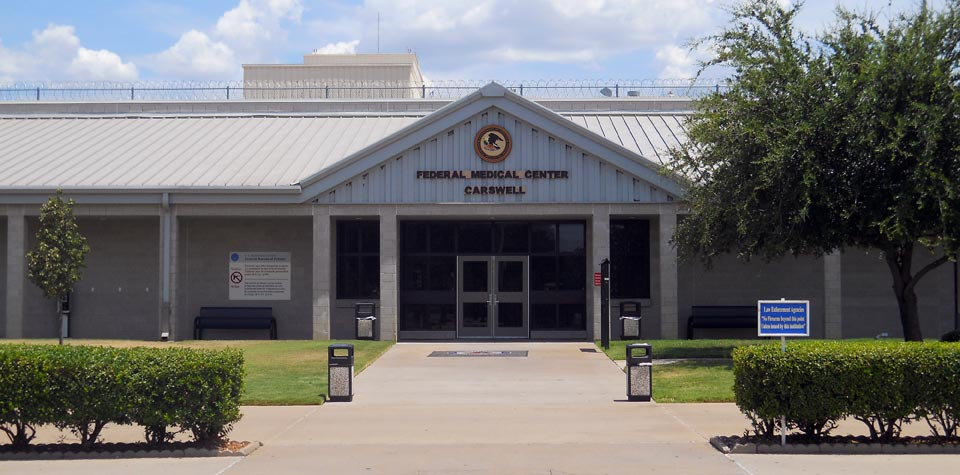
Coronel served her sentence at the Federal Medical Center, Carswell.

Coronel was arrested at Dulles International Airport on February 22, 2021. The Federal Bureau of Investigation's arrest warrant stated their probable cause included evidence of Coronel shuttling messages from Guzman to Sinaloa Cartel associates, assisting Guzman's escape from Federal Social Readaptation Center No. 1 "Altiplano" in 2015 through bribery and, following his recapture, helping coordinate another escape attempt aborted following Guzman's extradition. The affidavit cited a handwritten letter written and signed by Guzman, as well as the statements of two unnamed cooperating witnesses who had worked with Guzman. (Note: Affidavit Of Special Agent Eric S. Mcguire In Support Of An Application For A Criminal Complaint And Arrest Warrant (PDF) (Court Filing), D.D.C., February 17, 2021 – via RECAP)

Sources who spoke to Vice News on the condition of anonymity claimed that Coronel voluntarily surrendered and was seeking a court settlement. A lawyer representing Guzman and Coronel, Jeffrey Lichtman, denied it. The Department of Justice declined to comment, as did a spokesperson for the FBI. Coronel's lawyer Mariel Colón denounced her conditions in Alexandria City Jail, saying she spent 22 hours per day in a small cell with nothing to do but read.

On June 10, 2021, the United States Attorney for the District of Columbia and Coronel Aispuro agreed to a plea deal, in which she waived indictment and pleaded guilty in the U.S. District Court for the District of Columbia to a felony criminal information with three counts:

- Conspiracy to Distribute Heroin, Cocaine, Marijuana and Amphetamines for Unlawful Importation to the United States (21 U.S.C. §§ 959, 960, 963)
- Conspiracy to launder Monetary Instruments (18 U.S.C. § 1956)
- Engaging in Transactions and Dealings in Properties of a Designated Significant Foreign Narcotics Trafficker (21 U.S.C. §§ 1904 1906) (Note: INFORMATION as to EMMA CORONEL AISPURO (1) count(s) 1, 2, 3. (PDF) (Court Filing), D.D.C., March 26, 2021 – via RECAP) (Note: PLEA AGREEMENT as to EMMA CORONEL AISPURO (PDF) (Court Filing), D.D.C., June 10, 2021 – via RECAP) (Note: Statement of Facts in Support of Plea Agreement (PDF) (Court Filing), D.D.C., June 10, 2021 – via RECAP)

On November 30, 2021, Judge Rudolph Contreras of the U.S. District Court for the District of Columbia sentenced Coronel to three years in prison, followed by four years of supervised release. (Note: Judgment (PDF) (Court Filing), D.D.C., December 2, 2021 – via RECAP) The prison sentence was later reduced to 31 months. Judge Contreras did not sentence Coronel to the four years requested by prosecutors, noting that she was a teenager when she married Guzman and admitted her guilt upon capture. She served her sentence in Federal Medical Center, Carswell and was released on September 13, 2023.

== Personal life ==
In the summer of 2011, Coronel traveled to Lancaster, California, to give birth to twin girls at Antelope Valley Hospital. Guzmán's name was left off the children's birth certificates because the U.S. Department of State was offering a bounty of five million dollars for his capture.

In a 2016 Telemundo interview conducted by investigative reporter Anabel Hernández, Coronel argued that the life of her husband was in danger and begged for justice on his behalf. In 2019 she attended the New York trial of El Chapo with her children. She attended the courtroom almost every day of the trial, in what the press described as solidarity with her husband. She was interviewed in the reality show Cartel Crew on VH1.

== See also ==
- Mexican drug war
