= Torres (surname) =

Torres (sometimes Torrez or Torrès) is a surname in the Catalan, Portuguese, and Spanish languages, meaning "towers".

== History ==
A surname derived from any of several towns called Torres, plural of torre (tower), from Latin "turris." Torres is the 50th most common surname in the United States and the 11th most common Spanish surname. It is a common surname in Puerto Rico, Dominican Republic, Spain, Portugal, Colombia, Peru, Cuba, Mexico, Venezuela and the Philippines, among others. In Italy, among other countries, it is found as a Sephardic surname.

== People with the surname ==
=== Athletes ===
- Abraham Torres (born 1968), Venezuelan boxer
- Albert Torres (born 1990), Spanish racing cyclist
- Andrés Torres (born 1978), Puerto Rican baseball player
- Arturo Torres (soccer) (born 1980), American soccer player
- Aureliano Torres (born 1982), Paraguayan footballer
- Carlos Alberto Torres (1944–2016), Brazilian footballer
- Carolina Torres (born 1979), Chilean pole vaulter
- Dara Torres (born 1967), American swimmer
- Dilson Torres (born 1970), Venezuelan baseball player
- Erick Torres (born 1975), Peruvian footballer
- Eve Torres (born 1984), American wrestler
- Facundo Torres (born 2000), Uruguayan footballer
- Félix Ricardo Torres (born 1964), Paraguayan footballer
- Fernando Torres (born 1984), Spanish footballer
- Ferran Torres (born 2000), Spanish footballer
- Francisco Javier Torres (born 1983), Mexican footballer
- Georgie Torres (born 1957), Puerto Rican basketball player
- Gleyber Torres (born 1996), Venezuelan baseball player
- Héctor Torres (born 1945), Mexican baseball player
- Isa Torres, American softball player
- Ismael Torres (1952–2003), Argentine cyclist
- Joe Torres (baseball) (born 1982), American baseball coach
- Johnny Torres (born 1976), American soccer player
- José Torres (1936–2009), Puerto Rican boxer
- José Torres (1938–2010), Portuguese footballer and coach
- José Francisco Torres (born 1987), American soccer player
- Juan Francisco Torres (born 1985), Spanish footballer
- Liberman Torres (born 2002), Ecuadorian footballer
- Macnelly Torres (born 1984), Colombian footballer
- Marco Torrès (1888–1963), French gymnast
- Mariano Torres (born 1987), Argentine footballer
- Matthew Torres (born 2001), American Paralympic swimmer
- Michelle Torres, American tennis player
- Miguel Angel Torres (born 1981), American MMA fighter
- Miguel Torres Gómez (born 1986), Spanish footballer
- Mike Torres (born 1994), Dominican basketball player
- Norbert Torres (born 1990), Filipino-Canadian basketball player
- Óliver Torres (born 1994), Spanish footballer
- Óscar Torres (basketball) (born 1976), Venezuelan basketball player
- Pau Torres (born 1997), Spanish footballer
- Raffi Torres (born 1981), Canadian ice hockey player
- Raymundo Torres (boxer) (1941–1972), Mexican boxer
- Raymundo Torres (footballer) (born 1984), Mexican footballer
- Richard Torrez (born 1999), American boxer
- Roger Torres (born 1991), Colombian footballer
- Rusty Torres (born 1947), Puerto Rican baseball player
- Salomón Torres (born 1972), Dominican baseball player
- Sandra Torres (born 1974), Argentine marathon runner
- Sergio Torres (born 1981), Argentine footballer
- Tecia Torres (born 1989), American mixed martial artist
- Todd Torres (born 1968), Puerto Rican swimmer
- Xavi Torres (born 1986), Spanish footballer

=== Performers and media figures ===
- Albert Torres (1956–2017), Puerto Rican American salsa dancer and promoter
- Antonio Torres Jurado (1817–1892), Spanish guitarist and guitar maker
- Bartolomé de Torres Naharro (1485–1530), Spanish dramatist
- Coraima Torres (born 1973), Venezuelan actress
- Dayanara Torres (born 1974), Puerto Rican actress
- Diego Torres (born 1971), Argentinian pop singer
- Eddie Torres (1923–2000), Puerto Rican American salsa dance instructor
- Eduardo Serrano Torres (1911–2008), Venezuelan composer
- Eugenio Torres Villarreal (born 1964), Mexican wrestler, television host and rapper
- Fernanda Torres (born 1965), Brazilian actress
- Fernando Torres (1927–2008), Brazilian actor
- Gina Torres (born 1969), Cuban American actress
- Guillermo José Torres, Puerto Rican American TV reporter
- Joe Torres, American actor
- José Torres (born 1958), Cuban-Polish musician and percussionist
- Judy Torres (born 1968), Puerto Rican American pop musician and dancer
- Liz Torres (born 1947), American actress, singer and comedian
- Néstor Torres (born 1957), Puerto Rican jazz flautist
- Rawy Torres (born 1975), Puerto Rican musician
- Rhoda Torres (born 1978), Venezuelan actress
- Roberto Torres (born 1938), Cuban musician
- Samantha Torres, Spanish model
- Stephany Karina Zreik Torres
- Torres (born 1991), American musician
- Tico Torres (born 1953), Cuban American musician and Bon Jovi drummer
- Tommy Torres (born 1971), Puerto Rican musician
- Xavier Enrique Torres, Puerto Rican actor

=== Artists and writers ===
- Alberto Torres (politician), Brazilian social thinker
- Ana Teresa Torres (born 1945), Venezuelan writer
- Andrés Torres Queiruga (born 1940), Galician theologian, writer and translator
- Angelo Torres (born 1932), American cartoonist
- Ben Fong-Torres (born 1945), American rock journalist
- Diego de Torres Vargas, Puerto Rican historian
- Diego de Torres Villarroel (1693–1770), Spanish writer
- Edwin Torres, American/Puerto Rican poet
- Eloy Torrez, American painter
- Félix González-Torres (1957–1996), Cuban artist
- Fernanda Torres (born 1965), Brazilian singer and actress
- Fernando Torres (born 1984), Mexican singer
- Fina Torres (born 1951), Venezuelan filmmaker and writer
- Héctor Torres (born 1945), Venezuelan writer
- Joaquín Torres-García (1874–1949), Uruguayan artist
- José Torres (born 1925), Venezuelan actor
- Julio Romero de Torres (1874–1930), Spanish painter
- Julio Torres, Salvadoran filmmaker and actor
- María Torres Frías, Argentine poet and writer
- Raymunda Torres y Quiroga, Argentine writer and women's rights activist
- Tanya Torres, Puerto Rican artist, author, and poet
- Tereska Torrès (1920–2012), French novelist

=== Politicians and public figures ===
- Abdelkhalek Torres (1910–1970), journalist and nationalist leader in Morocco
- Aníbal Torres (born 1942), Peruvian lawyer and politician
- Art Torres (born 1946), American politician
- Camilo Torres Restrepo (1929–1966), Colombian Roman Catholic priest
- Camilo Torres Tenorio (1766–1816), Colombian politician
- Carlos Torres y Torres Lara (1942–2000), Peruvian politician
- Edwin Torres (born 1931), American state supreme court judge
- Eloy Torres Arias (1918-2006), Venezuelan politician
- Esteban Edward Torres (1930–2022), Californian politician
- Francisco José Torres (1790–1850), Venezuelan militar
- Gerver Torres, Venezuelan economist and politician
- Guillermo Torrez (born 1973), Bolivian politician
- Gumersindo Torres (1875–1947), Venezuelan lawyer and politician
- Gabriel de Torres (1782–1835), Spanish militar
- Henry Torrès (1891–1966), French lawyer, politician, and writer
- Hugo Torres Jiménez (1948–2022), Nicaraguan activist
- Jaime Torres Bodet (1902–1974), Mexican politician
- Juan José Torres (1920–1976), Bolivian President
- Lucy Torres-Gomez (born 1974), Filipino politician
- Manuel Torres (1762–1822), Colombian diplomat
- Manuel Montt Torres (1809–1880), Chilean statesman and scholar
- Miki Torres (born 1980), Peruvian politician
- Pedro León Torres (1778–1822), Venezuelan militar
- Raul Torres (born 1955), American politician
- Pedro Torres Ciliberto, Venezuelan entrepreneur and politician
- Ritchie Torres (born 1988), American politician
- Ruben Torres (born 1941), Filipino politician
- Sandra Torres (born 1955), Guatemalan politician

=== Scientists and explorers ===
- Belindo Adolfo Torres (1917–1965), Argentinian entomologist
- Carlos Torres, Chilean astronomer
- Leonardo Torres Quevedo (1852–1936), Spanish engineer and mathematician
- Luís Vaz de Torres, Spanish explorer of the Pacific

=== Criminals ===
- Javier Torres Félix (1960), Mexican convicted drug lord
- Manuel Torres Félix (1958–2010), Mexican suspected drug lord
- Raúl Meza Torres (1991–2010), Mexican suspected assassin

=== Others ===
- Carlos Torres (born 1978), Venezuelan professional umpire in Major League Baseball since 2015
- Chumel Torres (born 1982), Mexican comedian
- Emma Torres, Mexican-American migrant rights activist from Arizona
- Esther Torres (1897–1975), Mexican trade unionist
- Fernando Torres de Portugal y Mesía, the 16th-century viceroy
- Hortensia Torres (1924–1989), Catalan anarchist and anti-fascist activist
- Jacques Torres (born 1959), French pastry chef
- Susan Torres (1978–2005), American woman who gave birth while brain dead
- Tomás de Torres, Portuguese astrologer

== Fictional characters ==
- Adam Torres, a character in Degrassi: The Next Generation
- Alex Torres, a character in Knight Rider (2008 TV series)
- B'Elanna Torres, a character in Star Trek: Voyager
- Callie Torres, a character in Grey's Anatomy
- Cesar Torres, a character in the analog horror series The Mandela Catalogue
- Dante Torres, a character in the NBC series Chicago P.D.
- Diego Torres, a character in the Netflix series 13 Reasons Why
- Drea Torres, a character in Netflix Original Do Revenge
- Drew Torres, a character in Degrassi: The Next Generation
- Eddie Torres, a character in New York Undercover
- Fabiola Torres, a character from Never Have I Ever
- Izzie Torres, a character in Doctors
- Lisa Torres, a character in Doctors
- Matias Torres, a character in ACE COMBAT 7: Skies Unknown
- Nick Torres, a special agent from NCIS
- Eva "Papi" Torres, a character in The L Word
- Pépé Torres, the young killer in John Steinbeck's 1938 short story Flight (Steinbeck story)

== See also ==
- Luis Torres (disambiguation), several people
