= Hydrangea (disambiguation) =

Hydrangea is a genus of flowering plants.

Hydrangea may also refer to:

- USCGC Hydrangea (WAGL-236), a ship
- USS Hydrangea (1862), a ship
- Hydrangea (horse) (foaled 2014), an Irish Thoroughbred racehorse

== See also ==
- Hortensia (disambiguation)
