= José Figueroa =

Mexican general and politician (1792–1835)

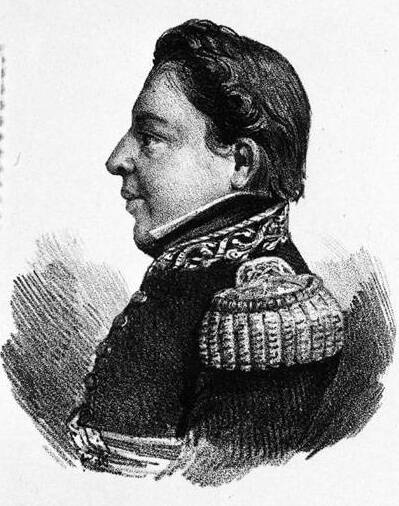
- Lithograph from C. L. Prudhomme, Álbum Mejicano (Mexico, 1843)

6th Governor of Alta California
- In office 15 January 1833 – 29 September 1835
- Appointed by: Anastasio Bustamante
- Preceded by: José María de Echeandía (south); Agustín V. Zamorano (north)
- Succeeded by: José Castro (civil); Nicolás Gutiérrez (military)

Commandant general of the Estado de Occidente
- In office 29 April 1828 – 1830
- In office December 1824 – 1827

Deputy in the Constituent Congress of the State of Mexico
- In office 2 March 1824 – December 1824
- Constituency: Cuernavaca

Personal details
- Born: 1792 Jonacatepec, Kingdom of Mexico, Viceroyalty of New Spain (now Morelos, Mexico)
- Died: 29 September 1835 (aged 42–43) Monterey, Alta California, Mexico
- Resting place: Mission Santa Barbara
- Spouse: María Francisca Gutiérrez (m. 1811)
- Occupation: Military officer; politician
- Awards: Order of Guadalupe

Military service
- Allegiance: Mexican Insurgency; Army of the Three Guarantees; Mexico
- Branch/service: Mexican Army
- Years of service: 1811–1835
- Rank: Brigadier general
- Battles/wars: Mexican War of Independence; Capture of Oaxaca; Battle of La Chincúa; Battle of El Tamo; Yaqui Wars; Yaqui Revolts in Estado de Occidente

José Secundino Figueroa y Parra (1792 – 29 September 1835), was a Mexican military officer and politician who served as governor and comandante general of Alta California from 1833 until his death. A veteran of the Mexican War of Independence, he served as an envoy in the negotiations between Vicente Guerrero and Agustín de Iturbide that preceded the Plan of Iguala which secured Mexican independence. In the decade after independence he held senior military commands in northern Mexico, most notably in the Estado de Occidente, where he campaigned against and then negotiated a settlement with the Yaqui leader Juan Banderas.

Sent to Alta California in 1832, Figueroa ended the 1832–33 split between acting officials in Monterey and San Diego, began implementation of the Mexican secularization laws, issued numerous land grants, placed Mariano Guadalupe Vallejo on the northern frontier opposite Fort Ross, and in 1835 published the Manifiesto a la República Mejicana, the first book-length work printed in California. He died in office at Monterey and was buried at Mission Santa Barbara.

== Early life ==
Figueroa was born in 1792 at Jonacatepec, in the southeastern borderlands of the present-day state of Morelos. He had a brother, Francisco, and a sister whose name is not recorded; nothing firm is known of his parents, but it is believed they were of Indigenous origin. Figueroa himself was described as "dark-skinned, short of stature, and proud of his Indian blood." Later California writers repeated the same physical description and his public pride in Indigenous ancestry. On 20 December 1811, at age nineteen and newly married to María Francisca Gutiérrez of Jonacatepec, he joined the southern insurgency of José María Morelos at the head of about twenty men from a local hacienda and was made a captain the same day.

== Mexican War of Independence ==
For two years Figueroa served under Morelos's second-in-command, the priest-general Mariano Matamoros, whose parish of Jantetelco lay a few miles from Jonacatepec. He took part in the capture of Oaxaca in November 1812 with the infantry regiment Nuestra Señora del Carmen, and in April 1813 accompanied Matamoros on the campaign toward the Guatemalan frontier that defeated the royalist lieutenant colonel Manuel Servando Dambrini at the Battle of La Chincúa. On 1 January 1813 Matamoros placed him in charge of the military treasury of his division. That service ended when Matamoros was captured after the Battle of Puruarán and executed on 3 February 1814.

Figueroa then served under Morelos's direct command. On 3 December 1814 Morelos appointed him secretary of the Intendency of Tecpan, the coastal province Morelos had created out of the insurgent-controlled territory in present-day Guerrero. After Morelos's capture and execution, Figueroa remained at his post and from 1817 to 1819 served as treasurer of the mobile insurgent provisional government as it moved through the tierra caliente.

In September 1818 he fought under Vicente Guerrero at the Battle of El Tamo, a victory over the royalist colonel José Gabriel de Armijo. On 25 November 1819 Guerrero promoted him to colonel of the Regimiento del Carmen, citing his “honesty, patriotism, knowledge, and the positive services he has rendered the motherland.” Historian C. Alan Hutchinson described Guerrero's relation to Figueroa as that of a "benefactor" and "close friend." Insurgent officers in the western part of the province shortly afterward acclaimed him comandante general of that sector.

=== Envoy to Iturbide and the Plan of Iguala ===
In early 1821 the royalist commander Agustín de Iturbide, sent south to suppress Guerrero, opened talks aimed at a joint independence. On 10 January Iturbide wrote to Guerrero suggesting he send a trusted intermediary; one of the four names he listed was Colonel Figueroa. Guerrero gave Figueroa full powers. Lucas Alamán, one of Guerrero's biggest detractors, later claimed that Guerrero’s correspondence in which he demanded total independence and citizenship without caste distinction was written by Figueroa. Iturbide later reported to Viceroy Juan Ruiz de Apodaca that Guerrero himself would not meet him:

Not having been able to inspire the necessary confidence in that caudillo to answer with me, we managed to get the individual who deserves all his trust, namely Don José Figueroa, to come.

On 24 February Iturbide proclaimed the Plan of Iguala, the political program under which the Army of the Three Guarantees brought the war to a close. Whether Guerrero and Iturbide ever met in person remains disputed. Lorenzo de Zavala and Carlos María de Bustamante popularized a face-to-face embrace, while Alamán held that Figueroa was the insurgent who treated with Iturbide because Guerrero would not appear. Figueroa marched with the newly formed army that triumphantly entered Mexico City on 27 September 1821.

== Career in independent Mexico ==
Upon Mexico's independence, Figueroa remained in the army and was promoted to brigadier general. On 29 July 1822 the imperial government named him a supernumerary of the Imperial Order of Guadalupe. After the fall of the Mexican Empire, Figueroa sat in the constituent congress of the State of Mexico. He appeared as a deputy from Cuernavaca when the congress opened on 2 March 1824, served as one of its secretaries, and was president of the congress in August 1824, when he signed the state's provisional organic law on 9 August. Around the same time he presented to the Commission on the Development of the Californias an ambitious and unrealized colonization scheme to be financed by the empresario John Hale, who then went bankrupt.

In December 1824 President Guadalupe Victoria appointed him comandante general inspector of the newly created Estado de Occidente (modern-day Sonora, Sinaloa and southern Arizona). His instructions included peacekeeping with the Indian nations of the north, building new presidios, inspection of mines, and developing an overland route from Sonora to Alta California. He reached his post at Arizpe by June 1825.

=== Yaqui War, 1825–1827 ===
State legislation that treated Yaqui, Mayo and Ópata communities as taxpaying citizens, together with attempts to raise auxiliary units and survey pueblo lands, provoked a major rising in 1825–26 under Juan Banderas, who appealed to other nations of the northwest and invoked a flag he said had belonged to Montezuma. Figueroa, then on a reconnaissance toward the Gila–Colorado confluence, turned back when the rising spread along the Yaqui and Mayo rivers.

On 6–7 August 1826 Figueroa defeated Banderas near Pitic in a two-day battle. The war continued into 1827. Despite criticism that he was too lenient, and despite a 16 February 1827 order naming Colonel José Joaquín Calvo as his successor, Figueroa closed the first phase of the war before Calvo arrived. On 13 April 1827, at five in the afternoon in the village of Potam near the mouth of the Yaqui River, Banderas and some two hundred men handed over their arms. Figueroa, moved by the condition of the starved and ragged fighters and their families, accepted a settlement rather than the extermination some locals demanded. Addressing his troops the next day he ordered them to “treat our unfortunate compatriots with love and consideration . . . let us treat the Yaquis and Mayos as our beloved President has ordered: like friends in peacetime and enemies in war.” Banderas was granted pardon, recognized as a captain-general of the Yaqui, and was given a salary. He rose again in 1832 and was captured and executed after Figueroa had already left for California.

=== Later roles and imprisonment, 1827–1832 ===
After the 1827 settlement Figueroa was transferred to Durango as comandante general. President Victoria sent him back to Occidente on 29 April 1828. On 5 September 1828 the state congress declared him a citizen of Occidente and renamed the town of Altar as Altar Villa de Figueroa.

In March 1830, after Vice-president Anastasio Bustamante had overthrown Vicente Guerrero, Figueroa was arrested in Mexico City on a rumor that he and others were plotting to restore Guerrero. No evidence of a conspiracy appeared; he was released after about a month in the former Inquisition jail. On 17 April 1832 the Bustamante government appointed him inspector and comandante general of Alta California. On 9 May he was also named jefe político, keeping the joint civil-military command.

== Alta California governorship ==
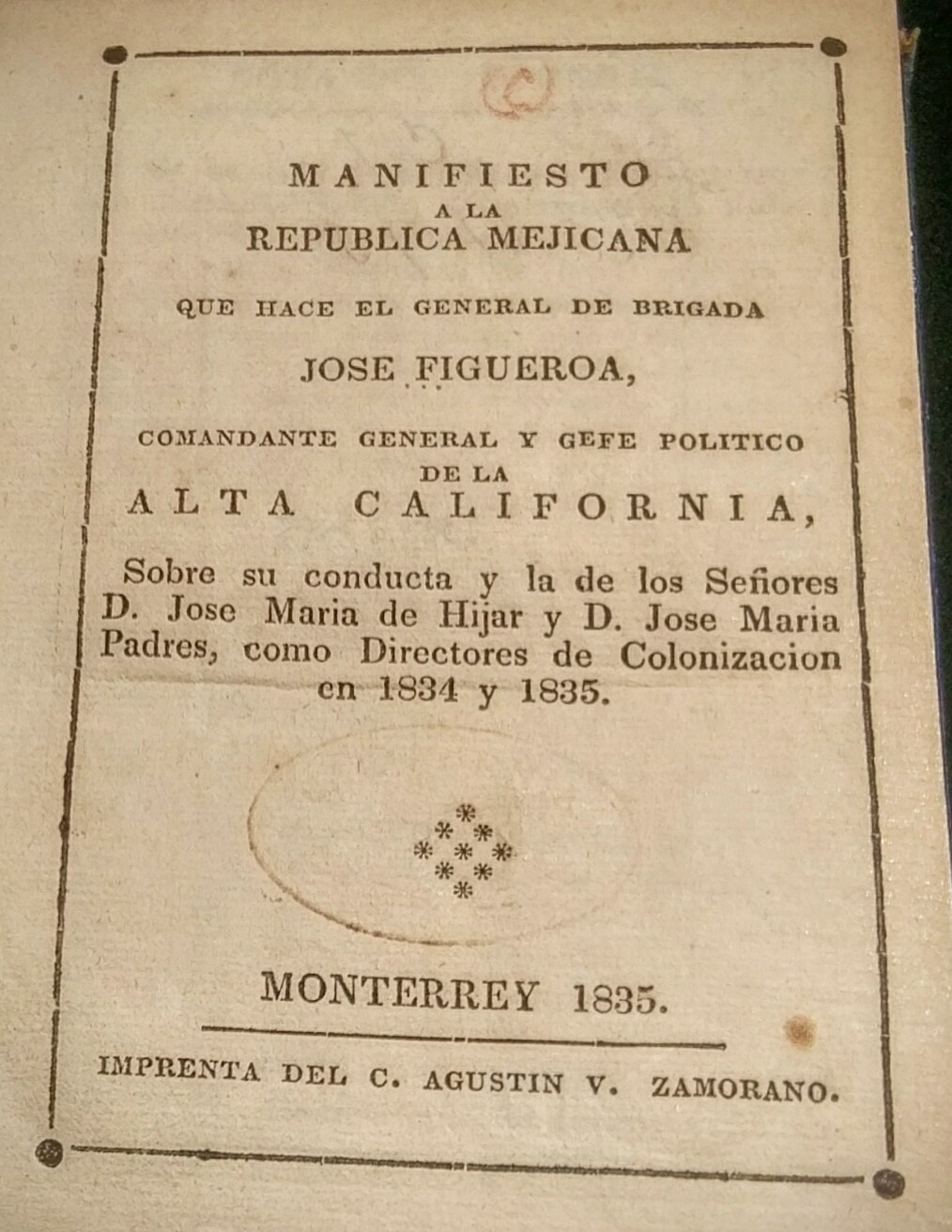
Figueroa's 1835 Manifesto, published in Monterey, was the first book printed in California.

After the overthrow of Manuel Victoria in December 1831, the southern diputación and the Plan of San Diego restored the jefatura política to José María de Echeandía at San Diego and Los Angeles. At Monterey a junta led by Captain Agustín V. Zamorano, Victoria's former secretary, rejected that plan. It declared the diputación's acts illegal and the civil office vacant until the supreme government named a successor; it filled only the comandancia general ad interim, by seniority, with Zamorano. In May 1832 the two sides agreed to a military partition pending an assignment from Mexico: Echeandía south of San Gabriel, Zamorano north of San Fernando. Figueroa landed on 14 January 1833. Zamorano received him the next day and transferred the northern command; Echeandía then gave way in the south, and the government was reunited.

His instructions from Mexico City included caution toward the growing foreign presence, encouragement of artisans and settlers, exploration north of San Francisco Bay, and construction of a presidio on that frontier as a counter to Fort Ross and the Hudson's Bay Company activity from the Columbia River. To carry out his order to occupy the northern frontier, Figueroa sent Lieutenant Mariano Guadalupe Vallejo north in 1833, granted him Rancho Petaluma in 1834, and on 24 June 1835 named him military commandant and director of colonization of the northern frontier, with instructions to found the pueblo of Sonoma. That commission made Vallejo the principal Mexican authority north of San Francisco Bay for years to come.

=== Secularization ===
The Mexican Congress's law of 17 August 1833 ordered secularization of the California missions. On 9 August 1834 he promulgated the Reglamento Provisional para la secularización de las Misiones de la Alta California, drafted with the territorial diputación. It directed that ten missions be converted into pueblos at once and the rest in succession; that friars be confined to spiritual ministry; that each head of a family or unmarried man over twenty receive a plot of between 100 and 400 square varas from mission lands; that remaining temporalities pass to government-appointed comisionados and mayordomos, civil administrators appointed to take the missions from the friars pending approval from Mexico City. By the end of 1834 nine missions had in fact been secularized: San Luis Rey, San Juan Capistrano, San Gabriel, San Fernando, Santa Bárbara, Purísima, Santa Cruz, San Francisco, and San Rafael.

On paper the Reglamento reserved a substantial share of mission land and stock for emancipated Indians and denied incoming colonists a prior claim. After his death the large estates went instead, through grants and through Californio comisionados, to the ranchero class.

=== Híjar-Padrés colony ===
To hasten secularization Acting president Valentín Gómez Farías, a liberal reformer, coupled the process with a colonization project. He named José María de Híjar director of colonization and prospective governor, and José María Padrés military commander, and dispatched some 239 selected colonists on the ships Morelos and La Natalie to occupy mission lands and stiffen Mexican settlement against Russia and the United States. While the colonists were at sea, Antonio López de Santa Anna resumed full power and revoked Híjar's appointment as governor. A courier, often identified as Rafael Amador, rode from Mexico City to Monterey in forty days and reached Figueroa before the ships did. Híjar arrived to find he had no civil authority.

Figueroa refused to turn the missions over to the colony. He argued that at least half the lands should go to California Indians under the old trust doctrine and that the territorial diputación, not a newly arrived directorate, should administer secularization. On 7 March 1835 a handful of colonists briefly seized the Los Angeles town hall; the revolt collapsed and its leaders were arrested. Figueroa then had Híjar and Padrés detained and shipped back to Mexico. Many of the ordinary colonists remained and entered local society.

=== Manifiesto a la República Mejicana ===
In 1835, on Agustín Zamorano's press at Monterey, Figueroa published Manifiesto a la República Mejicana que hace el general de brigada José Figueroa, comandante general y gefe político de la Alta California, sobre su conducta y la de los Señores D. José María de Híjar y D. José María Padrés, como directores de colonización en 1834 y 1835. It is a duodecimo of 183 pages of text plus printer's note, errata and a short obituary added after Figueroa died while the book was still in the press. It is the first book-length work printed in California and stands on the Zamorano Eighty list. C. Alan Hutchinson published a facing-page English edition in 1978. The book is both a legal-political defense of Figueroa's refusal to yield the missions to Híjar and Padrés.

== Illness, death and burial ==
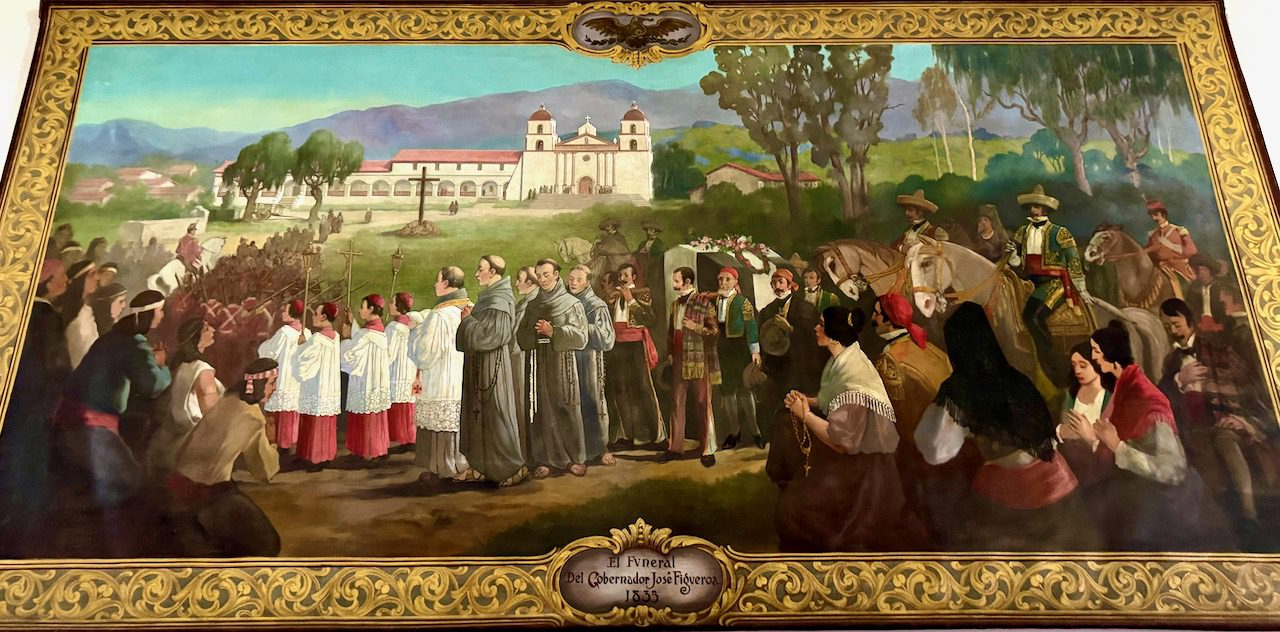
El Funeral del Gobernador José Figueroa (The Funeral of Governor José Figueroa); mural at Santa Barbara Courthouse by Theodore Van Cina; c. 1930.

Francisco García Diego y Moreno, who later became California's first bishop, reported that Figueroa was "greatly agitated on account of the disturbances that the colonists caused", and set out on a strenuous voyage in 1835 to calm the political turmoil. He sailed from Monterey to San Francisco, and with very little rest, on to San Diego and then he returned to Monterey in June, 1835, and was "already ailing". Although he was initially able to continue his work, he felt weak and did not recover. He attended the territorial assembly on 25 August, asked for leave on 27 August, and on 22 September resigned the civil command to José Castro, the senior vocal of the diputación, while the military command passed to Nicolás Gutiérrez.

On 27 September, he wrote his last will, asking that his body be preserved and buried at Mission Santa Barbara. He died at Monterey on the afternoon of 29 September 1835, aged about forty-three. The body was shipped south and reached Santa Barbara on 27 October, where it was placed in a crypt under the mission church. Rumors of poison circulated. García Diego later reported to Mexico City that Figueroa had shown symptoms of apoplexy and that blood clots were found in the brain when the body was prepared. In 1912 the coffin was opened: the remains were those of a man of small stature (no more than about 5 ft 2 in) in a Mexican military uniform, consistent with contemporary descriptions. The Monterey diputación, on a motion of Juan Bautista Alvarado, resolved in sessions of 10–14 October 1835 to hang Figueroa’s portrait in its hall with the inscription Bienhechor del territorio de la Alta California (“Benefactor of the Territory of Alta California”). The diputación also voted a monument at Monterey. The ayuntamiento drafted a inscription in Latin and Spanish calling Figueroa padre de la patria, but the work was never built.

== Legacy ==
Early 20th-century historian J. M. Guinn wrote that "He [Figueroa] is generally regarded as the best of the Mexican governors sent to California". Historian Kevin Starr wrote that Figueroa was "the most competent governor of California during the Mexican era".

Landmarks named after General José Figueroa include:

- Altar, Sonora was named Altar de Villa de Figueroa in 1828.
- Figueroa Mountain, in the San Rafael Mountains, Los Padres National Forest, Santa Barbara County, California
- Figueroa Street and Figueroa Avenue, in Los Angeles
  - Figueroa Street Tunnels
  - Figueroa at Wilshire

=== Figueroa rancho land grants ===
Selected land grants associated with Figueroa’s administration
Grant	Date	Grantee	Approximate area	Present location
Rancho Tecate	1833	Juan Bandini	4,439 acres (17.96 km^{2})	Tecate Municipality, Baja California
Rancho San Ramón	1833	Bartolomé Pacheco and Mariano Castro	8,917 acres (36.09 km^{2})	Contra Costa County
Rancho Ausaymas y San Felipe	1833	Francisco Pérez Pacheco	35,504 acres (143.68 km^{2})	Santa Clara County
Rancho Yerba Buena	1833	Antonio Chaboya	24,332 acres (98.47 km^{2})	Santa Clara County
Rancho Soquel	1833	Martina Castro	34,370 acres (139.1 km^{2})	Santa Cruz County
Rancho El Molino	1833	John B. R. Cooper	17,892 acres (72.41 km^{2})	Sonoma County
Rancho Sespe	1833	Carlos Antonio Carrillo	8,881 acres (35.94 km^{2})	Ventura County
Rancho Petaluma	1834	Mariano Guadalupe Vallejo	44,000 acres (180 km^{2}) (later enlarged to 66,622 acres (269.61 km^{2}))	Sonoma County
Rancho San Ramón	1834	José María Amador	20,968 acres (84.85 km^{2})	Contra Costa County
Rancho Monte del Diablo	1834	Salvio Pacheco	17,922 acres (72.53 km^{2})	Contra Costa County
Rancho San Pascual	1834	Juan Mariné	14,403 acres (58.29 km^{2})	Los Angeles County
Rancho El Sur	1834	Juan Bautista Alvarado	8,949 acres (36.22 km^{2})	Monterey County
Rancho Los Alamitos	1834	Juan José Nieto (partition of the old Nieto concession; later purchased by Figueroa)	28,027 acres (113.42 km^{2})	Orange / Los Angeles counties
Rancho Cañón de Santa Ana	1834	Bernardo Yorba	13,328 acres (53.94 km^{2})	Orange County
Rancho San Francisco de las Llagas	1834	Carlos Antonio Castro	22,283 acres (90.18 km^{2})	Santa Clara County
Rancho Salsipuedes	1834	Manuel Jimeno Casarín	31,201 acres (126.27 km^{2})	Santa Cruz County
Rancho Las Posas	1834	José Carrillo	26,623 acres (107.74 km^{2})	Ventura County
Rancho Paso de Bartolo	1835	Juan Crispín Pérez	10,075 acres (40.77 km^{2})	Los Angeles County
Rancho Aguajito	1835	Gregorio Tapia	3,323 acres (13.45 km^{2})	Monterey County

== See also ==
- Vicente Guerrero
- Plan of Iguala
- Yaqui Wars
- Secularization Act of 1833
- Agustín V. Zamorano
- Mariano Guadalupe Vallejo
- Ranchos of California

== Bibliography ==
- Hutchinson, C. Alan. “General José Figueroa’s Career in Mexico, 1792–1832.” New Mexico Historical Review 48, no. 4 (1973): 277–297.
- Bancroft, Hubert Howe. History of California. Vol. III. San Francisco: The History Company, 1886.
