= Raúl Meza =

Raúl Meza may refer to:

- Raúl Meza Ontiveros (1966–2007), Mexican suspected drug lord
- Raúl Meza Torres (1991–2010), Mexican suspected assassin
- Raul Meza Jr. (born 1960), American serial killer
