= Hortensia (disambiguation) =

Hortensia is a common name for the flowering plant genus Hydrangea.

Hortensia may also refer to:

== People ==
- Hortensia gens, an ancient plebeian family in Rome
- Hortensia (orator) (fl. 42 BC), a skilled orator, daughter of Quintus Hortensius Hortalus
- Hortensia Amaro (fl. from 1982), Cuban-American educator
- Hortensia Antommarchi (1850–1915), Colombian poet
- Hortensia Arnaud (1901–?), Argentine dancer, vedette, and actress
- Hortensia Arzapalo (born 1981), Peruvian runner
- Hortensia Bussi (1914–2009), wife of Chilean President Salvador Allende
- Hortensia Aragón Castillo (born 1960), Mexican politician
- Hortensia Fussy (born 1954), Austrian sculptor
- Hortensia García (1930–2016), Mexican-American athlete
- Hortensia Herrero (born 1950), Spanish businesswoman
- Hortensia Mata (1849–1934), Ecuadorian businesswoman
- Hortensia von Moos (1659–1715), Swiss scholar
- Hortensia Papadat-Bengescu (1876–1955), Romanian novelist
- Hortensia Blanch Pita (1914–2004), Spanish writer
- Hortensia Soto (fl. from 2001), Mexican-American mathematics educator
- Hortensia Torres (1924–1989), Catalan anarchist and anti-fascist activist

== Other uses ==
- Hortensia (insect), a genus of sharpshooters in the tribe Cicadellini
- 13116 Hortensia, a minor planet
- Hortensia (ballet step), a ballet step for male dancers
- Hortensia, a fictional character from the video game Fire Emblem Engage

== See also ==
- Hortensia diamond, part of the French Crown Jewels
- Lex Hortensia, a law passed in Ancient Rome in 287 BC
- Região das Hortênsias, a tourist destination in Brazil
- Villa Hortensia (Rosario), a mansion in Rosario, Argentina
