= Misael Torres Urrea =

Mexican drug lord (born 1991/92)

- Born: 1991 or 1992 (age 33–34)
- Other names: El M2
- Employer: Sinaloa Cartel
- Criminal penalty: Drug trafficking; Illegal possession of firearms
- Criminal status: Convicted (9 years)
- Spouse: Karen López (wife)
- Parent: Javier Torres Félix (father)

Misael Torres Urrea (Spanish pronunciation: [misa'el 'tores u're.a]; born 1991 or 1992), commonly referred to by his alias "El M2", is a Mexican convicted drug lord and former high-ranking leader of the Sinaloa Cartel, a criminal group based in Sinaloa. He is the son of Javier Torres Félix (alias "El JT"), a former leader of the Sinaloa Cartel who worked under Ismael "El Mayo" Zambada, one of Mexico's most-wanted men. In addition to his involvement in organized crime, he held a government post as syndic for a rural community in Cosalá, Sinaloa. He was the only candidate to run for this position, and held the role for less than a year.

Torres Urrea first came to public attention in 2008, when the Mexican Army discovered a photo of him with uncle Manuel Torres Félix (alias "El M1") following a raid in one of his uncle's ranches. At the scene they also discovered multiple assault rifles, drugs, an armored vehicle, among other suspicious belongings. Since then investigators have linked him to the Sinaloa Cartel and considered him one of the 122 most-wanted men in Mexico. In 2014, Torres Urrea was arrested by the Army in Culiacán, Sinaloa, and imprisoned at the Federal Social Readaptation Center No. 2, a maximum-security prison in Jalisco, where he serves a nine-year sentence.

== Personal life ==
Misael Torres Urrea, commonly referred to by his alias El M2, was born on 1991 or 1992 to Javier Torres Felix (alias "El JT") and Agapita Urrea. (Note: His date of birth was calculated based on his age (22) at the day of his arrest, 2 October 2014.) He had at least four siblings: Joel Torres Jiménez (sometimes spelled Joel Torres Urrea), María Luisa Torres Urrea, Marisol Torres Urrea, (Note: Marisol Torres Urrea died of lupus in Culiacán on 1 May 2015.) and Jesús Javier Torres Urrea. (Note: Jesús Javier Torres Urrea was arrested in November 2017 along with his uncle Rito Torres Félix.) His father was a high-ranking member of the Sinaloa Cartel, a criminal group based in Sinaloa. El JT worked directly under Ismael "El Mayo" Zambada, one of Mexico's most-wanted men, along with his brother Manuel Torres Félix (alias "El M1"). El JT was arrested in 2004 and extradited to the U.S. in 2006, where he was convicted of drug trafficking. Multiple members of the Torres clan were involved in drug trafficking; some of them, including Torres Urrea's father, siblings, uncles, and cousins, have been killed by security forces, rival criminal groups, or arrested for their alleged involvement in organized crime.

Torres Urrea was active on social media and uploaded content on Facebook and Twitter. Between 2008 and 2013, he uploaded pictures of his personal life, family, hobbies, and Christian beliefs; his activity on social media was closely monitored by journalists and investigators. He had pictures of himself with his daughter while hunting deer, fishing, and in religious sites. One of the pictures he took showed him posing in front of nativity of Jesus monument. Another one showed him at a site of Our Lady of Guadalupe. During his Valentine's Day, he uploaded the exorbitant gifts he gave to his wife Karen López. The picture showed fifteen balloons, two iPhone boxes, a Gucci purse, two dogs, a box of Godiva Chocolatier, and other undisclosed presents. He also uploaded pictures of his political campaign and displayed the party colors of red and green, suggesting he was probably supported by either the Institutional Revolutionary Party (PRI) or the Ecologist Green Party of Mexico (PVEM), which have those party colors.

According to government files, Torres Urrea was also a registered beneficiary of Secretariat of Agriculture, Livestock, Rural Development, Fisheries and Food (Sagarpa) and was on file as a bovinae producer. In 2011, he received MXN$7,200 from the Component for the Attention of Natural Disasters (CADENA) program. The following year, he received MXN$4,950 from the Livestock Productivity Stimulus Program (PROGRAN), where he was also registered as a producer of bovine meat in the village of Llanos del Refugio in Cosalá.

== Criminal career ==
On 20 September 2008, the Mexican Army raided a ranch owned by Torres Urrea's uncle in El Carrizal, a village close to El Salado in Culiacán Municipality. The operative began after they noticed a vehicle trying to flee from them and heading towards the property in an apparent attempt to let the occupants know of law enforcement's presence. Investigators stated that the occupants left the scene before the Army arrived. However, once authorities arrived at the scene, they discovered the following items: thirteen assault rifles, 4,894 cartridges, a 40 mm grenade, five bullet-proof vests and one bullet-proof jacket, an armored vehicle, uniforms from the Sinaloa State Police, military camouflage pants, a cash counting machine, radio communication equipment, and approximately 250 grams (8.8 oz) of cocaine and 120 grams (4.2 oz) of marijuana.

In addition, authorities discovered a photograph of El M1 and Torres Urrea. With this photograph, Mexico's Office of the General Prosecutor (PGR) decided to open a case against Torres Urrea in order to investigate him for his possible links to the Sinaloa Cartel and its leadership structure. The photo showed El M1 and Torres Urrea hugging shoulder to shoulder; Torres Urrea was sporting a side bag with a grenade attached to it and a handgun tucked to his belt just like his uncle. The Army leaked the picture to the press later that day, and it gained popularity on social media and among several narcocorrido (drug ballad) composers, including the Mexican music producer group El Movimiento Alterado, which used this photo to promote its songs. The leak was first time that Torres Urrea was publicly displayed.

With his father in prison, Torres Urrea reportedly succeed his role as a top operator within the Sinaloa Cartel and worked alongside his uncle El M1 and in-law Raúl Meza Ontiveros. This meant that Torres Urrea allegedly worked under El Mayo. According to Renato Salas Heredia, the head of Mexico's National Security Commission (CNS) (es), Torres Urrea was one of Mexico's 122 most-wanted criminals. Another of his family members on the list was Inés Enrique Torres Acosta, his cousin and son of El M1.

== Political career ==
Torres Urrea ran for a syndic position in La Ilama, a rural community in Cosalá, Sinaloa. (Note: In Sinaloa, each municipality is broken down in separate subdivisions, known as sindicaturas in Spanish. Cosalá had five: Cosalá, Santa Cruz de Alayá, Guadalupe De Los Reyes, San José De Las Bocas, and La Ilama.) He won the elections in March 2014 after being the only candidate to run for the position. He was paid MXN$10,000 every month and among his responsibilities were to help citizens during natural disasters. According to Cosalá mayor Samuel Zacarías Lizárraga Valverde, Torres Urrea legally met all the requirements for the position; since he did not have a criminal record at a state and municipal level, he was eligible to run for office. The mayor also stated that the municipal government open the position to its citizens and said they could not control the amount of applicants interested in the role. When asked about his relationship with Torres Urrea, the mayor clarified that he only met him the day Torres Urrea went to register as a candidate; he clarified that he knew the other syndics in Cosalá from years back. He also stated that his arrest would not cause disruptions in the municipal projects Torres Urrea was working on because there were other Cosalá officials working in them and were managing them more directly. (Note: Municipal officials stated that they began looking for Torres Urrea's replacement on 8 October 2014.)

In an interview with the press, state official Gerardo Vargas Landeros discarded the possibility that Torres Urrea had any criminals links with Lizárraga Valverde, and stated that he was not aware of any investigations by the PGR against the mayor, although he did not discard the possibility that one could arise as a result of Torres Urrea's arrest. When questioned about Torres Urrea's syndic eligibility, he stated that Torres Urrea presented a criminal background check form and came out clear at a state and municipal level. He said that it was up to federal authorities to determine if Torres Urrea was guilty of the criminal activities he was accused of. When registering as a candidate, Torres Urrea did not mention his political affiliation since the syndic position is mostly apolitical and is a citizen-driven position. He concluded the interview by stating that he did not believe that Torres Urrea's arrest damaged Sinaloa's political image.

The case reached the Governor of Sinaloa, Mario López Valdez, who stated that he did not know Torres Urrea and was not aware that he was son of El JT, the former leader of the Sinaloa Cartel. (Note: This was not the first time a member of the Torres family was found to be involved in politics. The former deputy of Sinaloa, Óscar Félix Ochoa, is a brother-in-law of Torres Urrea's father.) He said it was complicated for the state government to investigate the family ties of all its residents. Sinaloa's Noroeste newspaper criticized the government for claiming to be unaware of Torres Urrea's family background since the picture that showed him with his uncle El M1 had been circulating years prior to his election. He also clarified that he was not aware that Torres Urrea was wanted by the federal government. When questioned about the mayor's possible connection with Torres Urrea, the governor stated that he would not investigate him because Torres Urrea met the legal requirements to become a syndic. He stated that the state government would consider implementing a process to research state officials' backgrounds in more detail to determine their criminal history before they run for office.

Journalists also questioned López Valdez for a picture Torres Urrea took posing next to an AgustaWestland AW119 Koala state-owned helicopter used by the Sinaloa State Police. López Valdez responded by stating that as a part of their official duties, syndics often collaborate with security forces. He said that picture was likely taken in the Cosalazo, an annual off-road driving event in Sinaloa, and that it was not uncommon for civilians to take such pictures during public events. He clarified that Torres Urrea was likely participating as a local representative during the Cosalazo because the event is state-sponsored and many residents of Cosalá and elsewhere attend every year. He concluded the interview by saying that the state government did not believe that Torres Urrea used his syndic position to further his alleged criminal activities.

== Raid and arrest ==
On 2 October 2014, (Note: Another source stated the arrest happened on 1 October 2014.) Torres Urrea was arrested following a raid at his home in Camino Real neighborhood in Culiacán. (Note: Preliminary reports indicated that the Mexican Army carried out a raid inside Torres Urrea's home, but stated it was not confirmed that he had been arrested. The arrest was confirmed later that day. Another preliminary source incorrectly stated that the neighborhood where Torres Urrea was arrested was Rincones del Parque.) The operative was carried out at 4:00 a.m. by members of the Mexican Army and the Subprocuraduría Especializada en Investigación de Delincuencia Organizada (SEIDO), Mexico's organized crime investigatory agency. Three Army vehicles were used in the operation. One of them blocked the road to prevent other vehicles from accessing the street while others raided the property to apprehend Torres Urrea. When security forces forced their way into the property, Torres Urrea woke up and told his wife to go to their daughter's room and remain together. Torres Urrea was tied up on a chair while investigators searched his belongings. They took several weapons registered under the Army, money, and jewelry. By 8:00 am, other federal agents arrived at the scene and began questioning him on what he did for a living, where he kept his money, drugs, weapons, and what other houses he had. Neighbors reported that they heard gunshots during the operative. Investigators later confirmed that there were no injuries.

Security forces remained at Torres Urrea's home for most of the afternoon. They had breakfast and lunch at the scene while investigators conducted additional searches and continued their proceedings. Authorities confirmed that they also raided another house in Chapultepec neighborhood in Culiacán that they thought was linked to Torres Urrea. They claimed that multiple calls to Torres Urrea's home in Camino Real were made from this property. However, they were not able to officially confirm this information nor any links to Torres Urrea, and left the premises shortly after raiding it. At noon, investigators allowed María Luisa and Agapita, Torres Urrea's sister and mother, to enter the property and confirm that Torres Urrea was fine. The Army set up several checkpoints in the neighborhood to supervise those in the area, and would momentarily stop and search vehicles they thought looked suspicious. Several suspected Sinaloa Cartel scouts and Torres Urrea's family members surveilled the nearby area throughout the entire day, but only neighbors living in the same street where Torres Urrea lived were allowed to access the street while the officers were stationed there.

By 7:30, they put Torres Urrea in handcuffs and took him to the Culiacán International Airport. He was transported by at least 30 law enforcement officers and in a military convoy. Torres Urrea's family and friends followed the convoy to the airport. He was then transported to Mexico City and placed under preventative arrest. López and their six-year-old daughter were kept under custody and released hours later. Torres Urrea arrived at the SIEDO installations at 5:30 a.m. the following morning, where he gave his first legal declaration. The judge he faced charged him with organized crime involvement and for being in possession of a small quantity of narcotics. Torres Urrea's family stated that they did not trust the Army and that they were going to sue them for reportedly stealing multiple of his belongings from his home during the raid.

== Imprisonment and conviction ==
Torres Urrea was imprisoned at the Federal Social Readaptation Center No. 2 (also known as "Puente Grande"), a maximum-security prison in Jalisco. On 6 October 2014, Torres Urrea's sister Marisol and wife issued a writ of amparo at a court in Sinaloa requesting for Torres Urrea's release. The request stated that Torres Urrea was subject to cruel and unusual punishment, a violation of Article 22 of the Constitution of Mexico. They stated he was beaten, tortured, and kept away from communicating with his family. The judge who presided over the case reached out to officials responsible for raids, arrest warrants, and preventative detentions. The writ of amparo also reached the Mexican Navy, the Mexican Air Force, the Army, and the PGR. The presiding judge, however, denied the request on 24 October 2014.

On 3 May 2017, Torres Urrea was sentenced to nine years in prison for drug trafficking and illegal possession of military-exclusive weaponry. He was ordered to pay MXN$6,377 in fines. The PGR had initially charged him with money laundering as well, but they did not provide evidence to the prosecution, which only moved forward with the first two charges mentioned. On 15 May 2018, the PGR was able to provide evidence of money laundering and issued a formal charge against Torres Urrea. The defendant appealed the motion, but a judge denied the request in August 2018. The defense issued another appeal, but this one was denied as well. According to the PGR, the day Torres Urrea was arrested, authorities discovered he had MXN$409,200 and US$10,430 in cash. They were not able to confirm the origin of the money and suspect it came from illicit activities. Torres Urrea said it came from his cattle business.

On 28 November 2018, a judge from a Mexico City penal court denied Torres Urrea's request to move him from Puente Grande to Penal de Aguaruto, a lower security prison in Culiacán. The transfer request was denied because of his criminal background, his social adaptability in prison, and for his familial ties with other members of the Sinaloa Cartel. The judge acknowledged that the prison conditions in Culiacán were not adequate for a high-profile criminal like Torres Urrea because of the prison breaks reported in the facility.

== See also ==
- Mexican drug war
