= Raúl Meza Torres =

Mexican criminal

- Born: César Raúl Meza Torres; 31 October 1991; Culiacán, Sinaloa, Mexico
- Died: 25 April 2010 (aged 18); Zapopan, Jalisco, Mexico
- Cause of death: Gunshot wounds
- Other name: El Mini 6
- Employer: Sinaloa Cartel (suspected)
- Partner: Teresa Zambada Niebla (girlfriend)
- Parent: Raúl Meza Ontiveros (father)

César Raúl Meza Torres (Latin American Spanish: [ˈsesaɾ raˈul ˈmesa ˈtores]; 31 October 1991 – 25 April 2010), commonly referred to by his alias "El Mini 6", was a Mexican suspected assassin of the Sinaloa Cartel, a criminal group based in Sinaloa. He was the son of Raúl Meza Ontiveros (alias "El M6"), a leader of the Sinaloa Cartel. By the age of 15, Meza Torres aspired to be like his father and became involved in organized crime. He was popular on social media for posing in pictures with his weapons and for following his father's footsteps. Meza Torres's pictures later served as inspiration for other teenagers aspiring to join organized crime in Mexico.

His criminal career was short-lived, however. Meza Torres was killed at the age of eighteen following a routine traffic stop in Zapopan, Jalisco, on 25 April 2010. According to the police, Meza Torres and one of his accomplices were pulled over, but they tried to intimidate the policemen by flashing their weapons. When the officers ordered them to turn themselves in, Meza Torres killed one officer but was mortally wounded by another. He was taken to a private hospital and was pronounced dead that morning.

== Early life and background ==
César Raúl Meza Torres was born in Culiacán, Sinaloa, Mexico, on 31 October 1991. His birth certificate was registered in Cosalá, Sinaloa, on 7 February 1992. His parents were Raúl Meza Ontiveros (father) and Aida Elizabeth Torres Félix (mother). (Note: The information on his birth certificate can be retrieved in the cited source by using his Unique Population Registry Code (CURP), METC911031HSLZRS02, along with one of his parents' name.) His father was reportedly a high-ranking leader of the Sinaloa Cartel, a criminal group based in Sinaloa. His mother was the sister of Javier Torres Félix (alias "El JT") and Manuel Torres Félix (alias "El M1"), who worked alongside his father. Meza Torres was often referred to by his alias El Mini 6, in reference to his father, whose alias was El M6. He was also nicknamed Raulillo and Raulito, diminutives of his middle name Raúl.

Many of Meza Torres's relatives were involved in drug trafficking just like his father. Several of Meza Torres's relatives, including his father, uncles, and cousins, have been killed by security forces, rival criminal groups, or arrested for their alleged involvement in organized crime. Meza Torres was also romantically involved with Teresa Zambada Niebla, sister of imprisoned Sinaloa Cartel leader Vicente Zambada Niebla (alias "El Vicentillo") and daughter of Ismael "El Mayo" Zambada, a high-ranking Sinaloa Cartel leader who his father and brother-in-laws reported to.

== Criminal career ==
Since he was young, Meza Torres aspired to be like his father. By the age of 15, he got involved in the organized crime activities in the Sinaloa Cartel and began following his father's footsteps. He joined the Sinaloa Cartel as one of its young assassins. On social media, he had multiple pictures of himself posing with firearms; most of them were uploaded by him or his friends. His friends admired him and often commented on how he was poised to become as influential as his father. Meza Torres was popular on Facebook and MetroFLOG, and his image later helped inspire other young Mexican boys to pursue careers as organized crime hit men.

On 9 October 2007, a few months after his father was killed, (Note: His father Raúl Meza Ontiveros was killed in Culiacán, Sinaloa, on 27 March 2007. Meza Torres was 15 years old when this happened.) Meza Torres (aged 15) was pulled over by the transit police in Las Quintas neighborhood in Culiacán for driving an armored vehicle without license plates. He was subsequently arrested after not having paperwork that accredited him as the legal owner of the vehicle. He was a minor at that time and was with two other underage boys, Brayan Raúl Rodríguez Verdugo (aged 14) and Jesús Arley Pérez (aged 17). In the police report, Meza Torres address was in Villa Satélite neighborhood in Culiacán.

Meza Torres found himself in more legal trouble two years later. On 19 June 2009, he was drag racing in Las Quintas when the transit police showed up. When the police arrived at the scene and ordered the two vehicles to stop, several gunmen got off from their vehicles and began shooting at the officers. A shootout between the transit police and the assailants broke out. The gunmen eventually fled the scene and abandoned one of the two vehicles. When state authorities arrived at the location to investigate the crime scene, they discovered that the abandoned vehicle was owned by Meza Torres, and that there was a license plate inside the vehicle that corresponded to one reported as stolen. At the scene, they discovered FN 5.7×28mm (used for the FN Five-seven pistol), .223 Remington, .38 Super, and .45 ACP cartridges. One policeman was injured in the attack.

== Shootout and death ==
On 25 April 2010, Meza Torres (aged 18) was killed in a shootout with municipal police officers in Zapopan, Jalisco. (Note: Preliminary sources incorrectly identified Meza Torres as Raúl Mendoza López, José Luis Pérez López, and/or José Luis Quiñones Flores, and with an older age.) The confrontation began in early hours of the morning when police officers were patrolling Las Águilas neighborhood, in the intersection between Sierra Tapalpa and Avenida 18 de Marzo streets, and noticed a vehicle they found suspicious. When the policemen ordered the vehicle to stop for a routine search, Meza Torres and his accomplice Fidel Rojas Félix (aged 22) taunted them by pulling their weapons and shooting straight up into the air. The officers asked them to calm down and turn themselves in, but both men then attacked the officers. Meza Torres killed police officer Jaime Vicente Morales Domínguez; he died instantly after being shot in the head. Police officer José Luis Monroy suffered three gunshot wound injuries in his hand, leg, and thorax. However, Monroy was able to respond to the aggression and mortally wound Meza Torres.

After seeing that Meza Torres was shot, Rojas Félix attempted to flee the scene by jumping onto the rooftop of a property. He was arrested there by other policemen. The police confirmed that both men were from Sinaloa. At the scene, the police officers confiscated a .38 Super (used by Rojas Félix) and 9 mm (used by Meza Torres) handguns, 22 rounds of ammunition, and two cartridges. Rojas Félix was taken into custody by state officials from the Intentional Homicide Office of the General Prosecutor, where the government would determine his criminal status. When interrogated, Rojas Félix stated that Meza Torres and him had met with Ignacio "Nacho" Coronel Villarreal, a suspected leader of the Sinaloa Cartel, days prior. He also stated that the weapons they were carrying were owned by Coronel Villarreal. Investigators asked Rojas Félix to discuss the topics covered in the supposed meeting and to help them locate the property where it took place, but Rojas Félix said he could not remember. This investigation reached the Subprocuraduría de Investigación Especializada en Delincuencia Organizada (SIEDO), Mexico's former organized crime investigatory agency, but they declined to investigate.

=== Burial and aftermath ===
The Zapopan Municipal Police stated they planned to carry out a ceremony in memory of officer Domínguez. Meza Torres was taken in a private vehicle to the hospital to treat his gunshot wounds. He was pronounced dead at 3:40 a.m. after medical intervention. His autopsy report confirmed that Meza Torres had a gunshot wound and multiple blunt injuries in his head, likely produced by pistol-whipping. His body was handed over to Meza Torres's aunt María Luisa Torres Félix and his sister Adriana Meza Torres. It was then transferred to Culiacán that same morning, where his family held a wake at a funeral home on Emilio Zapata boulevard. His body stayed at the funeral home for three days before it was sent by his family to Meza Torres's home, where another wake was held. He was buried on 29 April 2010 in a silver casket.

In his court presentation, Rojas Félix stated he was innocent and that he did not know Meza Torres was involved with organized crime. Rojas Félix said he was unarmed and that Meza Torres was the one that attack the two policemen. When asked about what they were doing in Guadalajara, he stated that they were in town to visit some of their family members. He also stated that he was tortured by Zapopan police and forced to place his fingerprints on the evidence. The policemen stated that Rojas Félix was also armed and fired his gun at them before attempting to flee the scene. Rojas Félix was charged with homicide and attempted homicide.

== Legacy ==
When Meza Torres was a teenager, musicians composed two narcocorridos (drug ballads) about him. The first one was made by Jesús Arley Pérez, a long-time friend of his. The second one talked about his military uniform, lifestyle as a criminal, and the firearms he used and appeared with in multiple pictures. After he died, other narcocorridos detailing his life and death were composed. Several of them were available on YouTube.

== See also ==
- Mexican drug war
