= María Torres Frías =

Argentine poet

María Torres Frías (Note: In this name that follows Hispanic American naming customs, the first or paternal surname is Torres and the second or maternal family name is Frías.) (1877/1883–1953 or 1954) was an Argentine poet and writer.

== Biography ==
Torres Frías was born in Salta. She first published during her teenage years and went on to teach at the Escuela Normal de Salta. Highly regarded as a poet, she wrote for various literary journals, such as La Revista and El Búcaro Argentino, founded by Peruvian writer Clorinda Matto de Turner. On the cover of issue No. 10 of 15 November 1898, her portrait appeared on the magazine's cover and was featured in a complimentary article about the writer.

According to El Búcaro Argentino, "Her work earned her recognition from critics in the country and abroad, especially with the publication of her books Aurora Borealis (1934) and Phosphorescences (1930), which were recommended as reading texts for schools dependent on the Education Council of the province of Salta."

== Selected works ==
- Violetas (1899)
- Hojas de rosa (1902)
- Oro y nieve (1907)
- Camino del ensueño (1923)
- Ritmo sonoro (1941)
- Hontanar (1941)
