= Jardines Del Humaya =

Narco Cemetery in Culiacán, Sinaloa, Mexico

Coordinates: 24.7572°N 107.3603°W

Jardines del Humaya is a cemetery outside the city of Culiacán, in the Mexican state of Sinaloa, established in 1969. The cemetery has gained notoriety for its mausoleums built for deceased cartel members that are unique and lavish in their style. They resemble real life houses and the associated opulence that these cartel members were used to prior to their deaths.

== Notable burials ==
- Marcos Arturo Beltrán Leyva (1967–2009) – Drug lord
- Inés “El Ingeniero” Calderón Quintero (1954–1988) – Organized crime figure
- Manuel Clouthier (1934–1989) – Politician
- Ignacio Coronel Villarreal (1954–2010) – Drug lord
- Manuel Torres Félix (1958–2012) – Drug lord
