= Manuel Torres Félix =

Mexican drug lord and cartel leader

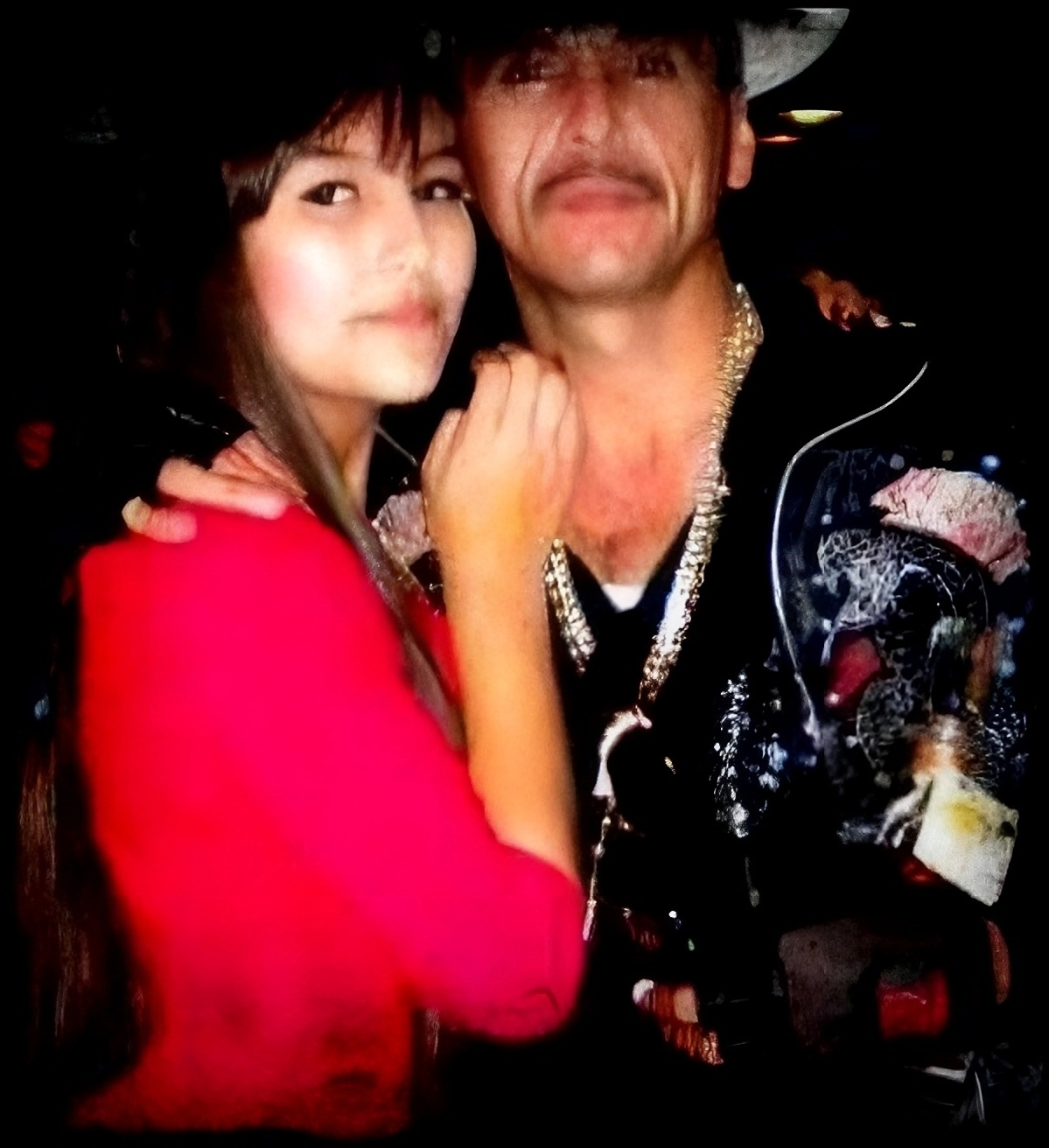
- Manuel Torres Félix (undated photo)
- Born: Manuel Fidel Torres Félix; 9 February 1958; Cosalá, Sinaloa, Mexico
- Died: 13 October 2012 (aged 54); Culiacán, Sinaloa, Mexico
- Cause of death: Gunshot wounds
- Burial place: Jardines Del Humaya, Cualiacán
- Other name: El M1, El 14, El Ondeado
- Occupation: Sinaloa Cartel lieutenant
- Employer(s): Ismael Zambada; Joaquín Guzmán Loera
- Known for: Drug trafficking, murder
- Predecessor: Javier Torres Félix

José Manuel Torres Félix (Spanish pronunciation: [xoˈse maˈnwel ˈtores ˈfeliɣs]; 28 February 1958 – 13 October 2012), also known as El M1, EL 14, and/or El Ondeado, was a Mexican drug lord and high-ranking leader of the Sinaloa Cartel.

Born in a small town in the state of Sinaloa, Torres Félix began working for the Sinaloa Cartel in the 1990s and later ascended to the apex of the cartel after his brother Javier Torres Félix was arrested in 2004. He then began to work with Ovidio Guzmán López, the son of Joaquín Guzmán Loera, Mexico's former most-wanted man, and oversaw drug trafficking shipments coming in from South America into Mexico under the tutelage of Ismael Zambada García.

When his son was killed by rival gang members of the Beltrán-Leyva Cartel in 2008, Torres Félix reportedly lost his mind and went on a killing spree, torturing the perpetrators at his home in Culiacán. This earned him the nickname of "El Ondeado" ('The Crazy One') for his emotional instability and explosive personality.

Torres Félix was gunned down in a clash with the Mexican Army on 13 October 2012.

== Criminal career ==
José Manuel Torres Félix was born on 3 September 1958 in the town of Llanos del Refugio in Cosalá, Sinaloa. He had worked for the Sinaloa Cartel since 1990, but ascended to a high-ranking position after the capture of his brother Javier Torres Félix in 2004. Along with Ovidio Guzmán López, the son of Joaquín Guzmán Loera, Torres Félix oversaw drug shipments coming in from South America into the Mexican states of Chiapas and Oaxaca.

In September 2008 under the Operation Sinaloa, the Mexican military located a safe house owned by Torres Félix, where they confiscated several firearms, narcotics, radio communications equipment, and an armored vehicle. The Mexican military also found a photo of Torres Félix accompanied by Misael Torres Urrea, nicknamed El M2, his nephew and son of Javier Torres Félix. Torres Félix was placed on the most-wanted drug traffickers list under the Foreign Narcotics Kingpin Designation Act by the U.S. government on 1 June 2011, along with Gonzalo Inzunza Inzunza (a.k.a. El Macho Prieto), another high-ranking lieutenant of the Sinaloa cartel. The PGR offers up to $3 million Mexican pesos for information leading to their arrests.

Manuel reportedly lived in the hills and valleys of Sinaloa, rarely frequenting urban areas. He would often go two or three days without sleep, always in alert.

=== Death of his son ===
According to the United States Department of the Treasury, Torres Félix got public attention on 18 April 2008 when rival members of the Beltrán-Leyva Cartel assassinated his son Anastasio Torres Acosta in an ambush attack, injuring his daughter Alondra (aged 4) and sister-in-law Sandra Rivas Heredia (aged 24). At the crime scene, the gunmen left a written message on the behalf of Arturo Beltrán Leyva:

"On behalf of your friend [Arturo] and his nephews Los Zetas. So you can understand, Manuel Torres."

With the death of his son, Torres Félix reportedly "went crazy" and took revenge of the perpetrators by torturing them in his home. According to police reports, the death of Anastasio marked the beginning of the cartel war in the state of Sinaloa.

Torres Félix became one of the most dangerous drug traffickers in Sinaloa; hundreds of deaths were attributed to the commandos led by Torres Félix, who earned the pseudonym of "El Ondeado" ('The Crazy One') for his emotional instability that started after the death of Anastasio.

== Death ==
Torres Félix was killed in a gunbattle in the community of Oso Viejo in Culiacán, Sinaloa early in the morning on 13 October 2012. His body was sent to the forensic center and was guarded by the military in order to prevent his henchmen from snatching the body.

After the shootout, the military confiscated several stashes of weapons, ammunition, and other materials.

Prior to his death, Torres Félix was a key figure and major drug trafficker for Ismael Zambada García and Joaquín Guzmán Loera, Mexico's most wanted man.

=== Funeral ===
After his death, Torres Félix's corpse was sent to the San Martín funeral house in Culiacán, where family members and friends visited to pay their respects. Outside the parlor, the Mexican Army guarded the area and established checkpoints in the nearby streets.

Torres Félix was then buried in Jardines Del Humaya, a cemetery outside the city of Culiacán where the remains of his son Atanasio lie too.

=== Aftermath ===
The Mexican Armed Forces increased their presence in the state of Sinaloa to prevent any violent reprisals from organized crime for Torres Félix's death. A Facebook page was set up just hours after his death, which include personal photos. As of November 2012 the page has nearly 40,000 fans.

On the morning of 16 October 2012, three days after the death of Torres Félix, at least three "narcomantas" ('narcobanners') appeared throughout the city of Culiacán denouncing Ismael Zambada García of betraying and setting up Torres Félix to be killed by the Mexican Army.

=== Analysis of repercussions ===
According to the Mexican Army, the death of Torres Félix dealt a huge blow against the internal structure of the Sinaloa Cartel because he was the right-hand man of Zambada García and a major administrative figure in the organization. InSight Crime, on the other hand, believes that it is unclear exactly how much impact Torres Félix's absence will have on the cartel. Given the organization's immense size and influence, the agency alleges that Torres Félix will not affect the overall drug trafficking logistics of the Sinaloa Cartel. His death, however, can serve as a reminder that the Mexican government is willing to take down top leaders in the Sinaloa Cartel in their home turf. If what the authorities say is true about Torres Félix's importance, Zambada García is probably uneasy by the news. At the same time, however, InSight Crime points out that Zambada García may have purposely set up Torres Félix to get killed.

== Family ==
Manuel is brother of Javier Torres Félix (a.k.a. El JT), a close associate and leader of a group of hitmen headed by Ismael Zambada, a drug lord of the Sinaloa cartel; Javier was arrested in 2004 and extradited to the United States in December 2006. The son of Javier is Misael Torres Urrea, M-2.

Raúl Meza Ontiveros, El M-6, was the brother-in-law of Manuel; he was killed by gunfire in March 2007. His sons were César Raúl Meza Torres El Mini-6, and Arturo Meza Torres, and his brother was Faustino Meza Ontiveros, killed on 8 January 2009. On 18 April 2008, Atanacio Torres Acosta, the 20-year-old son of Manuel, was shot dead in Culiacán, Sinaloa. His daughter Alondra (aged 4) was injured in the attack and subsequently lost her forearm. The next day, Manuel responded by killing two gunmen allegedly responsible for killing his son.

Joel Torres Jiménez, the son of Javier and nephew of Manuel, was shot in Culiacán with three other people on 28 February 2010. Joel Torres is still alive today though being attacked 3 occasions and surviving.

His nephew, and son of Raúl Meza Ontiveros, was Raúl Meza Torres, El Mini 6, who was killed in Zapopan, Jalisco, on 25 April 2010 after a shootout with the police.

Arturo Salazar Aispuro, alias El Tury and a nephew of Manuel, was killed with four other gunmen on 24 January 2011 in Mexicali.

The son-in-law of Manuel, Onorio Félix Gutiérrez, was ambushed and killed by a group of gunmen in Culiacán on 18 March 2011. He was married to Yazira Torres, the daughter of Manuel, and the couple had a son.

His nephew Francisco Torres, alias El 50, was killed in a gunfight with the Mexican Army in Culiacán on 3 July 2013. Francisco was a main operator of the Sinaloa Cartel in that city, responsible for carrying out several violent acts and overseeing the retail drug sales.

== Narcocorridos ==
A narcocorrido, of the Movimiento Alterado subgenere, sung by the musical groups El Komander, Los Buitres de Culiacan, Los Buchones de Culiacan, Rogelio Martinez el RM, Los Nuevos Elegantes, Noel Torres, Erik Estrada, Oscar Garcia, and Los 2 Primos and titled Sanguinarios del M1 on YouTube ("The Bloodthirsties of M1") exalts Torres Félix for leaving decapitated and mutilated bodies in the trunk of cars as a message to his rivals. The lyrics of the song dedicated to Torres Félix start with the following:

With an AK-47 and a bazooka on our heads
cutting off heads that cross our path
We're bloodthirsty and crazy – We love to kill
Bullets fired and extortions carried out, just like the best of us
Always in a convoy of armored cars, wearing bullet-proof vests and ready to execute people.

The album sold 100,000 copies and had over 12 million hits on YouTube by March 2012. Reportedly, the daughter of Torres Félix sent a Facebook message to one of the band members thanking him on the behalf of the drug lord, "saying [Manuel Torres Félix] liked [the song]."
