= Francisco Iriarte y Conde =

Francisco Iriarte y Conde (1790–1832) was the governor of Occidente State and later of Sinaloa during the 1820s and early 1830s.

Iriarte y Conde was from a family involved in the mining business of the region. Iriarte y Conde inherited a silver and gold mine from his father. He was one of the main advocates of the separation of Sinaloa and Sonora.

== Sources ==
- short webpage on Iriarte y Conde
- Sinaloa congress article on Iriarte y Conde
