= Hortensia Mata =

Ecuadorian businesswoman and philanthropist

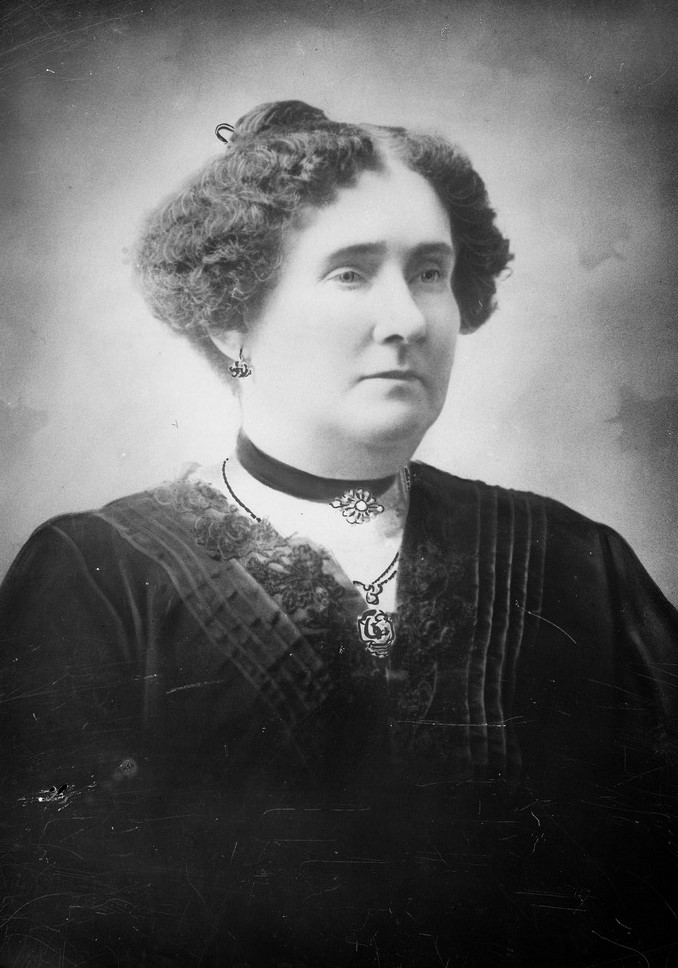
- Hortensia Mata in 1915
- Born: May 11, 1849; Guayaquil, Ecuador
- Died: January 24, 1934 (aged 84); Cuenca, Ecuador
- Resting place: Cuenca Patrimonial Cemetery
- Occupation(s): businesswoman and philanthropist
- Spouse: José Miguel Ordóñez Lazo
- Children: 16
- Parent(s): Gral. Antonio Mata and Viteri Carmen Lamota Tello

Hortensia Mata Lamota (May 11, 1849 – January 24, 1934) was an Ecuadorian businesswoman and philanthropist. She was considered the First Lady of Cuenca due to her political, economic, and cultural influence. She made financial contributions and raised funds during the Peru-Ecuador Conflict.

== Biography ==
Hortensia Mata was born in Guayaquil, on May 11, 1849. She was the daughter of Gral. Antonio Mata y Viteri and Carmen Lamota Tello. In 1855, she and her family traveled to Quito, where she studied at the Colegio de los Sagrados Corazones. In 1865 she settled in Cuenca and carried out civic and charitable works.

In 1907, she attended and hosted the French Academics of the Second Geodesic Mission at her home. In 1910 she presided over the "Patriotic Board of Ladies of Cuenca". During the Conflict with Peru, she collaborated with "10 mil Sucres" for the "Caja de Guerra" and raised funds for the purchase of food and supplies; she was the largest subscriber to Banco del Azuay shares in 1913; she also hosted the Manager of the Pichincha bank, Carlos Pérez Quiñónez; to Alfredo Baquerizo Moreno, Archbishop Manuel María Pólit Lazo and aviator Elia Liut.

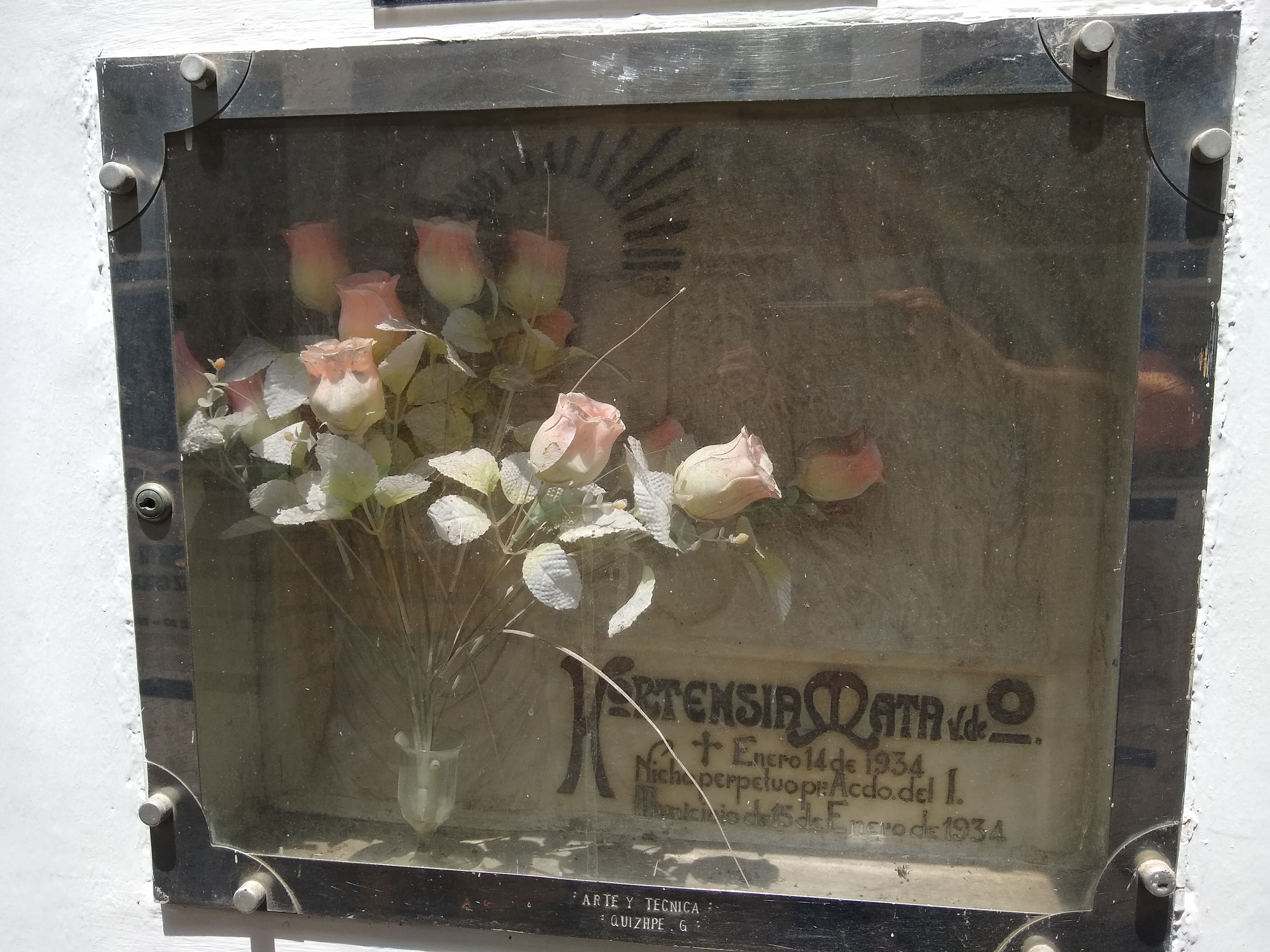
Grave of Hortensia Mata

== Personal life ==
Hortensia married José Miguel Ordóñez Lazo, a man from Cuenca with a very good economic position; The marriage was held at The Church of the Society of Jesus, in Quito, on May 20, 1865, from this marriage 16 children were born, Hortensia's assets were inherited and managed by Dr. David Ponce.
