= Raúl Meza Ontiveros =

Mexican drug lord

- Born: 11 December 1966; Tamazula, Durango, Mexico
- Died: 27 March 2007 (aged 40); Culiacán, Sinaloa, Mexico
- Cause of death: Gunshot wounds
- Other names: El M6
- Employer: Sinaloa Cartel (suspected)
- Predecessor: Javier Torres Félix
- Children: César Raúl Meza Torres

Raúl Meza Ontiveros (Latin American Spanish: [raˈul ˈmesa ontiˈβeɾos]; 11 December 1966 – 27 March 2007), commonly referred to by his alias "El M6", was a Mexican suspected drug lord and high-ranking leader of the Sinaloa Cartel, a criminal group based in Sinaloa. He was the right-hand man of Javier Torres Félix (alias "El JT"), the former leading operator of Ismael "El Mayo" Zambada, one of Mexico's most-wanted drug lords. In 1997, he was arrested with several of his accomplices in Cancún in possession of 348 kilograms (767 lb) of Colombian cocaine. He was sentenced to ten years in prison, but was released in 1998 for inconsistencies in the case. Investigators suspected that he rejoined organized crime after his release and climbed up the leadership chain of the Sinaloa Cartel.

Upon the arrest of El JT in 2004, Meza Ontiveros worked closely with Manuel Torres Félix (alias "El M-1") and Misael Torres Urrea (alias "El M-2"). In 2007, he was killed by armed men in Culiacán, Sinaloa. The official details regarding his death are unknown. In the following years, his family suffered several losses. In 2009, his sibling Faustino was killed by suspected organized crime members. His son César Raúl Meza Torres (alias "El Mini-6"), who tried to follow Meza Ontiveros' footsteps, joined the Sinaloa Cartel as a young assassin. He was killed by security forces in 2010.

== Early life and career ==
Raúl Meza Ontiveros, commonly referred to by his alias El M6, was born in La Mesa del Rodeo, a rural community in Tamazula, Durango, Mexico, on 11 December 1966. Though originally from the state of Durango, he did most of his criminal career in Sinaloa. In 1989, he was arrested by the Sinaloa Ministerial Police for homicide and false declaration charges. In 1990, he was charged by Sinaloa's Office of the General Prosecutor for kidnapping, rape, and for concealing rape evidences against two women.

According to Mexico's Office of the General Prosecutor (PGR), Meza Ontiveros was a high-ranking member of the Sinaloa Cartel, a criminal group based in Sinaloa. He worked under Javier Torres Félix (alias "El JT), a leading operator of Ismael "El Mayo" Zambada, one of Mexico's most-wanted drug lords. He was also a close associate of other suspected Sinaloa Cartel leaders like Manuel Torres Félix (alias "El M-1"), brother of El JT, and Misael Torres Urrea (alias "El M-2"), El JT's son. On 27 May 1997, Meza Ontiveros was arrested by the Federal Judicial Police in Cancún, Quintana Roo, (Note: In the 1990s, Cancún was a major drug corridor for Zambada. He used this city to import Colombian cocaine heading to the United States.) with El JT and two other men, Ramón López Serrano and Manuel Meza Zamudio. (Note: Another source cites an additional accomplice, Fernando Ruffo Álvarez.) Following their arrest, authorities were led to a safe house that contained 348 kilograms (767 lb) of Colombian cocaine that Meza Ontiveros and the others who were with him had reportedly received from traffickers in the Caribbean Sea. At the scene, they also discovered several vehicles modified with compartments where investigators believe smugglers intended to conceal the drugs for further distribution in northern Mexico. They also seized two boats and multiple weapons.

Meza Ontiveros was sent to the military camp in Cancún once he was in custody. He was sentenced to ten years in prison that year, but a judge granted his release on 16 December 1997. He left prison on 11 March 1998. According to court indictments, the judge absolved Meza Ontiveros and the rest of his accomplices because of a mistake the PGR did in assembling evidence. The judge cited multiple "inconsistencies" in the lawsuit presented against the defense. The Subprocuraduría de Investigación Especializada en Delincuencia Organizada (SIEDO), Mexico's former organized crime investigatory agency, identified him as a leader of the Sinaloa Cartel since his release. His role within the Sinaloa Cartel increased when his boss El JT was arrested in Culiacán, Sinaloa, in January 2004. With this arrest, Meza Ontiveros succeeded him as a main operator under Zambada. Other sources stated that his relatives El M-1 and El M-2 reportedly took over El JT's activities in the Sinaloa Cartel following his arrest.

== Death ==
On Tuesday, 27 March 2007, Meza Ontiveros was killed in Culiacán. The Sinaloa Ministerial Police stated that they did not have official information about how Meza Ontiveros died. They were called to a location in Las Quintas neighborhood because they were notified of a shootout between armed suspects. When they arrived at the scene the shootout had ended, but they were told that three armed assailants had taken a wounded man, Meza Ontiveros, to a private clinic. The police headed to the clinic but were impeded entry by Meza Ontiveros' family. The clinic personnel confirmed that Meza Ontiveros was killed. One account stated that Meza Ontiveros was dropping off his girlfriend in Montebello neighborhood when several men, who were waiting for him at the domicile, shot him in point-blank range. At least two gunshot wounds reportedly stuck his face.

According to his autopsy report, he had a coup de grâce wound, showed signs of having been beaten, and had three wounds in his skull that were made with a sharp object. Investigators confirmed that Meza Ontiveros was tortured, but authorities did not disclose the details surrounding his death. The family denied investigators entry to the clinic, and requested the medics who attended Meza Ontiveros to keep the details confidential. His family only authorized the clinic personnel to release his name, age, and that he had died as a result of multiple gunshot wounds.

== Family ==
Meza Ontiveros was the brother-in-law of El JT and El M-1. He had a son, César Raúl Meza Torres (alias "El Mini 6"). El Mini 6 was a nickname he used from his father's alias El M6. César Raúl followed his father's footsteps and joined the Sinaloa Cartel as a young assassin. He was killed in a shootout with security forces on 25 April 2010 in Zapopan, Jalisco, after he killed a police officer earlier in the confrontation. (Note: Another source stated César Raúl was killed on 25 April 2010.) One source stated that Meza Ontiveros had another son, Arturo Meza, who was killed on 8 May 2008. However, he was confused with Arturo Meza Cázares, son of suspected Sinaloa Cartel leaders Arturo Meza Gaspar and Blanca Margarita Cázares Salazar.

Meza Ontiveros' sibling Faustino Meza Ontiveros (aged 27) was killed by armed suspects in Culiacán on 8 January 2009. He was driving a vehicle in the streets of Culiacán when a pick-up truck with armed suspects tried to cut him off the road in an attempt to pull him over and kidnap him. Faustino got out of his vehicle and fled to a store, but the gunmen went after him and killed him inside the premises. Eyewitnesses notified the police of the incident, but no arrests were made.

== See also ==
- Mexican drug war
