= USS Hydrangea =

Gunboat of the United States Navy

History

United States
- Ordered: as Hippodame
- Laid down: date unknown
- Launched: 1862
- Acquired: 16 October 1863
- Commissioned: 18 April 1864
- Decommissioned: 1 September 1865
- Stricken: 1865 (est.)
- Home port: Hampton Roads, Virginia; Port Royal, South Carolina
- Fate: Sold, 25 October 1865

General characteristics
- Displacement: 224 tons
- Length: 120 ft (37 m)
- Beam: 20 ft 3 in (6.17 m)
- Draught: depth of hold 9 ft 6 in (2.90 m)
- Propulsion: steam engine; screw-propelled
- Speed: 11 knots
- Complement: not known
- Armament: one 20-pounder Parrott rifle; two 12-pounder howitzers

USS Hydrangea was a steamer acquired by the Union Navy during the American Civil War. She served the Navy in various ways: as a tugboat, a dispatch boat, a ship's tender, and as a gunboat in waterways of the Confederate States of America.

== Built at Buffalo, New York, in 1862 ==
Hydrangea, a wooden steam tug, was built as Hippodame in 1862 at Buffalo, New York, and purchased by the Navy at New York City, from her owner, C. TV. Copeland, 16 October 1863. She commissioned at New York Navy Yard 18 April 1864.

== Assigned to the North Atlantic blockade ==
Reporting to Hampton Roads, Virginia, for duty with the North Atlantic Blockading Squadron, Hydrangea spent May towing monitors and acting as tender to Onondaga. She then took up station in the James River, where she acted as a tug and mail boat.

Making two trips a day from Deep Bottom, near the front lines, to the large supply base at City Point, Virginia, she helped support the Union efforts to break the military stalemate around Richmond, Virginia.

== Transferred to the South Atlantic blockade ==
Hydrangea was then transferred to the South Atlantic Blockading Squadron 23 July 1864, and after repairing reported to Port Royal, South Carolina, 30 September.

She was used as a blockading ship and tug inside the Charleston Bar until the end of the war.

== Post-war decommissioning, sale, and subsequent career ==
Hydrangea decommissioned at New York City 1 September 1865, and was sold 25 October to S. and J. M. Flanagan. Silverstone records Hydrangea as serving with the North Atlantic and South Atlantic blockading squadrons in 1864–65 before being sold out of naval service and subsequently becoming the merchant vessel Norman. Redocumented Norman 4 January 1866, she returned to private service and was stranded and lost off Cape May, New Jersey, 17 November 1886.
