= Hortensia Aragón Castillo =

Mexican politician

- Born: 31 May 1960 (age 66); Chihuahua, Chihuahua, Mexico
- Occupation: Politician
- Political party: Party of the Democratic Revolution

Hortensia Aragón Castillo (born 31 May 1960) is a Mexican politician from the Party of the Democratic Revolution. She represents Chihuahua and the first electoral region in the Chamber of Deputies for the LXIII Legislature of the Mexican Congress.

== Life ==
Aragón Castillo has a lengthy history of socialist activism and teaching. She joined the Mexican Communist Party in 1976, when she served on the student council of the Rural Normal School of Saucillo, Chihuahua. At the same time, she joined the United Federation of Rural Socialist Students of Mexico. In 1980, she graduated from the Regional Normal Education Center of Aguascalientes as an accredited primary school teacher, and in the mid-1980s, she added a technical degree in Mexican Folkloric Dance and a degree in Middle Education — Social Sciences from institutions in Chihuahua, beginning a 29-year teaching career. Meanwhile, she joined the Unified Socialist Party of Mexico and its successor, the Mexican Socialist Party, and upon the foundation of the PRD in 1989, she joined that party.

Aragón primarily spent the early 1990s learning, as she almost completed a degree in anthropology from the National School of Anthropology and History; she served on the Chihuahua unit's student council between 1992 and 1995. She would also obtain a master's degree in Educational Development from the Chihuahua Graduate Center.

In 1995, Aragón became the head of the PRD in Chihuahua, a position she held for two years, and a national party councilor; she also founded women's organizations within the PRD, serving as its delegate to Socialist International Women from 1998 to 2003 and its women's secretary from 1999 to 2000. She also sat on a 1996 commission that reformed Chihuahua's constitution and state electoral law. In addition, in 1996, Aragón helped to found the Foro Nuevo Sol, an internal political faction within the PRD.

After making a failed bid in 1997, the PRD sent Aragón, representing the state of Nuevo León in the second region, as a proportional representation deputy to the Chamber of Deputies for the LVIII Legislature between 2000 and 2003. She was a secretary on a special commission that followed the investigation of femicides in Ciudad Juárez and sat on a range of others, including Public Education and Educational Services; Justice and Human Rights; Population, Borders and Migratory Matters; Attention to Vulnerable Groups; and Science and Technology. She also sat on the Executive Committee for the Network of Parliamentary Women of the Americas, a branch of the Parliamentary Confederation of the Americas, between 2001 and 2002.

The rest of the 2000s were spent in a variety of PRD positions; she sat on the PRD's state Board of Directors in Chihuahua between 2003 and 2005 and served as the national secretary of Political Relations and Alliances from 2005 to 2008. In 2008, Aragón Castillo became the party's secretary general, its second-highest position, holding the job for three years.

From 2013 to 2015, Aragón Castillo served as a local deputy in the LXIV Legislature of the Congress of Chihuahua, heading its PRD faction. She was the president of the Science and Technology Commission and also headed the Editorial Matters, Information and Library Committee, in addition to serving on other special and regular commissions. She was just one of ten deputies with a master's degree in the local congress, of a total of 33.

In 2015, the PRD returned Aragón to the Chamber of Deputies, this time representing her home state of Chihuahua, for the LXIII Legislature. She presides over the Public Education and Education Services Commission and sits on those dealing with Government and Gender Equality.

== Personal ==
Aragón's sister, María Guadalupe Aragón Castillo, was the interim leader of the PRD in Chihuahua from 2015 to 2016 and is the alternate deputy to Hortensia.
