= Tanya Torres =

Puerto Rican artist and writer

- Born: 1969 (age 56–57); New York City, New York, U.S.
- Education: City College of New York

Tanya Torres (born 1969 in New York City) is a Puerto Rican artist, author, and poet. After being born in New York, her family moved back to San Germán, Puerto Rico where she grew up until she was 15 years old and then returned to New York.

== Education ==
She received her B.A. in Art Education at the City College of New York and was offered a scholarship for an M.F.A. in Printmaking with a minor in Painting.

== Life and artwork ==
In 1997 she moved to El Barrio where she created the artistic space Mixta Gallery. Her artwork has been presented at the United Nations Organization, the Center for Puerto Rican Studies Library, the Museum of the 19th Century Dominican Family in Santo Domingo (Dominican Republic), the Porta Coeli Museum of the Institute of Puerto Rican Culture, and the Prague Congress Centre in the Czech Republic, among other cultural institutions.

Torres is also the force behind "Children Without a Nationality" project which she describes as: "The idea came about when I told a friend that I was going to exhibit the Battle Body pieces in Santo Domingo, Dominican Republic. She told me that she had recently found out that children born of Haitian parents in the Dominican Republic do not have the right to Dominican citizenship and live in the worst conditions."

== Awards ==
The New York City daily El Diario/La Prensa selected her as one of the newspaper's annual 50 Women of the Year for 2002.
