= Elia Liut =

Italian aviator

- Born: Elia Antonio Liut; March 6, 1894; Fiume Veneto, Italy
- Died: May 12, 1952 (aged 58); Quito, Ecuador
- Occupation: Aviator
- Known for: First man in the world to fly across the Andes of Ecuador
- Spouse: Carmela Angulo
- Parent(s): Felice Liut and Teresa Giust

Elia Antonio Liut (Fiume Veneto, March 6, 1894 - Quito, May 12, 1952) was an Italian aviator who was the first to fly across the Andes of Ecuador on 4 November 1920, where he is regarded as a national hero.

== Biography ==
His parents were Felice Liut and Teresa Giust; he was the second of eight children. At the age of 10, Liut moved to Argentina with his younger brother, following his father's emigration a few months before; he remained in South America for 8 years before returning to Italy.

Liut was 20 when in 1914 World War I broke out in Europe. He joined the military, and after basic training, he asked to join its air force. He got his pilot's license in 1915, and partook in many battles and aerial reconnaissance missions throughout Europe.

After settling in Ecuador he married Carmela Angulo from Quito.

== First Trans-Andean Flight ==
Liut's move to Ecuador began when the consul of Ecuador in Rome, Miguel Valverde Letamendi, invited him to Ecuador to help it develop its aviation program. At the same time, the owner of the Ecuadorian newspaper "El Telégrafo", José Abel Castillo, who was informed of the event, was looking for a way to increase the number of subscribers to his paper. When Castillo found out that Liut was invited to Ecuador, he hired Liut, and his mechanic Giovanni Fedelli, and took on the costs associated with bringing a plane from Italy to Guayaquil. Castillo then intended to employ the plane to distribute his newspaper daily throughout other parts of Ecuador.

In July 1920, Elia Liut arrived in Guayaquil accompanied by two mechanics, Giovanni Fedelli and Giovanni Ancilloto. The plane they brought with them, the Macchi-Henrit HO, had the name “Telégrafo I” painted on it. They test flew the plane in Guayaquil successfully, and this became national news. It was then that the Centennial Board of Cuenca asked Liut to perform a flight exhibition in Cuenca as they celebrated their 100th year of independence.

The Centennial Board began thinking of ways to get the plane from the coastal city of Guayaquil to the mountainous city of Cuenca. The original plan was to dismantle the plane and transport it from Guayaquil to Huigra via the railroad, and from there to Cuenca by human strength. Liut thought the idea was awful and expressed to the Board that the best way to get the plane from Guayaquil to Cuenca was to fly.

Once Castillo gave his permission for the flight, the date of the flight was set for November 3, 1920. They then defined what course to take, and informed telegraph operators what route they would take so that the plane's location could be reported as they flew over each town, and they also flattened a landing strip so that the plane could land when it arrived at its destination. But on the day of the flight, bad weather conditions precluded the plane from taking off, and the flight rescheduled to the next day.

That is how the Telégrafo I flew out of Guayaquil on November 4, 1920, at 10:30am and arrived about an hour later in Cuenca. (Note: The plane was reported by a telegraph operator to be over Biblián at 11:25, and arrived at Cuenca "a short time later".) The plane was met in Cuenca by thousands of its residents who had come to watch the plane land, they waved their handkerchiefs and hats.

He was then taken by the crowd to the city center, where he was acclaimed and recognized as the "Conqueror of the Andes", and also proclaimed the “Andean Condor”. According to his own words it was "... the most lovely and honorary title I have yet had in my life ...".

== Legacy ==
A biography of him was written under the title of "Un as de alto vuelo" by the prestigious Ecuadorian writer and poet Luis Zúñiga.
