= Battle of La Chincúa =

War of Mexican Independence battle

- Part of the Mexican War of Independence
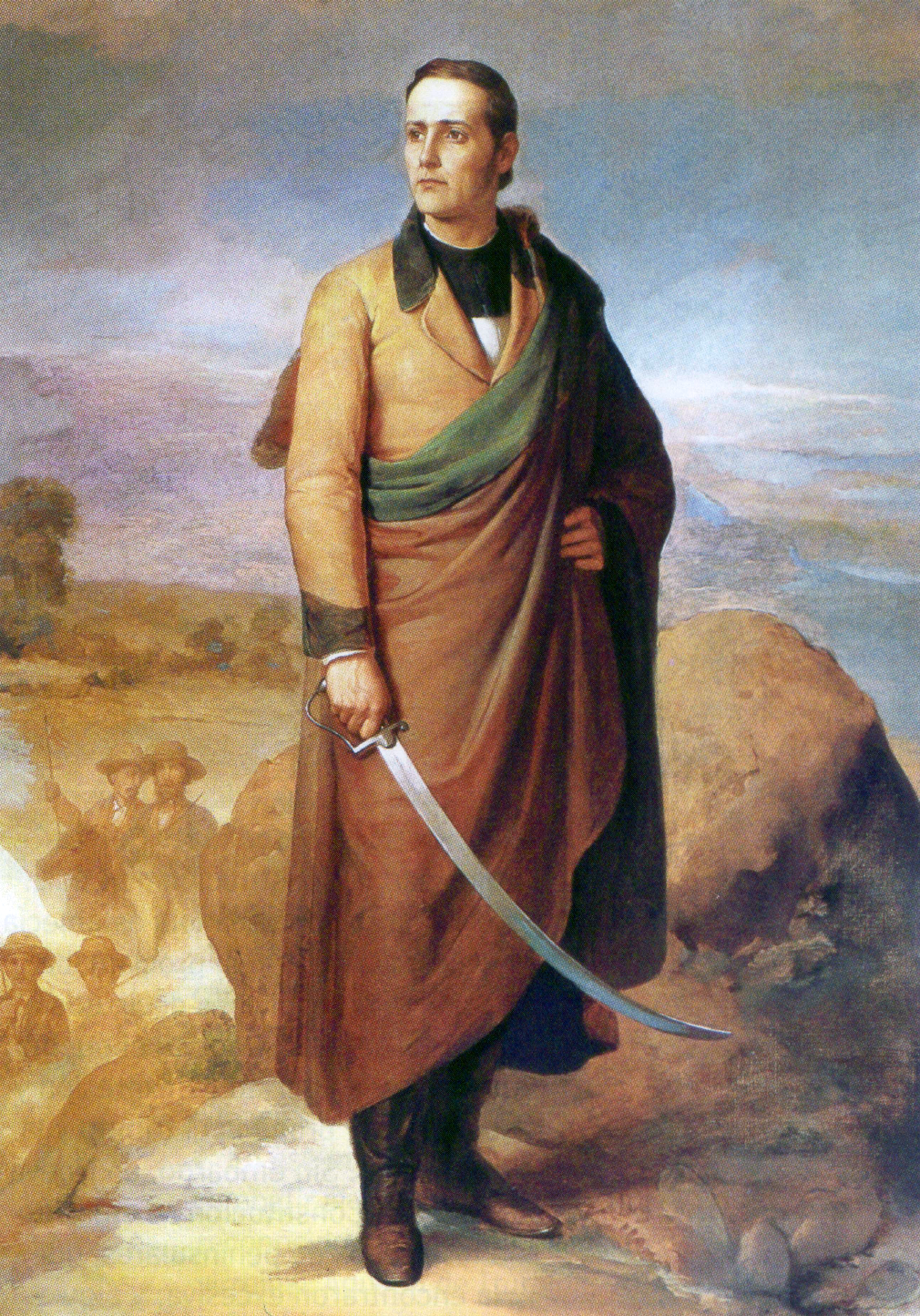
- A portrait of Mariano Matamoros who commanded the Mexican rebel forces in the battle.
| Date | 19 April – 28 May 1813 |
| Location | Tonalá, Chiapas, Mexico |
| Result | Mexican rebel victory |

Belligerents
| Mexican Rebels | Spanish Empire |

Commanders and leaders
| Mariano Matamoros y Guridi | Miguel Dambrini |

Strength
| 1,000 soldiers | |

The Battle of La Chincúa was a battle of the War of Mexican Independence that occurred from 19 April through 28 May 1813 at a ranch at Tonalá, Chiapas. The battle was fought between the royalist forces loyal to the Spanish crown, commanded by General Miguel Dambrini, and the Mexican rebels fighting for independence from the Spanish Empire, commanded by Mariano Matamoros y Guridi. The battle resulted in a victory for the Mexican rebels.

== Context ==
Matamoros had fewer than 1,000 soldiers with which to confront the royalist forces under Miguel Dambrini. Dambrini, knowing of the insurgent offensive began a retreat towards Guatemala. When the two armies finally met 6 kilometers from Tonalá, Chiapas, the first skirmishes took place resulting favorably for the rebel forces.

== The battle ==
After this retreat, the royalist forces were pursued by the rebel cavalry where after they were obliged to take refuge at a ranch at Tonalá. When Matamoros arrived, Dambrini was obliged to capitulate, surrendering all his arms, munitions and provisions. The Spanish prisoners were all executed in the Paredón Bay. During the battle, Matamoros was wounded in the leg and was thereafter forced to stay for a time at the ranch. Soon after this victory, he was promoted to Teniente General.
