= Luis Torres =

Luis Torres may refer to:

== Arts and entertainment ==
- Luis Lloréns Torres (1876–1944), Puerto Rican poet, playwright, and politician
- Luis Torres Nadal (1943–1986), Puerto Rican playwright, poet and theatrical director
- Luis Torres (musician), DJ with Dzeko & Torres

== Explorers ==
- Luis de Torres (died 1493), Christopher Columbus's interpreter on his first voyage
- Luís Vaz de Torres (c. 1565–c. 1607), Spanish maritime explorer

== Politicians ==
- Luis Raúl Torres Cruz (born 1960), Puerto Rican politician
- Luis Torres (judge) (1880–1959), Filipino supreme court justice (List of justices of the Supreme Court of the Philippines)
- Luis Torres (Chilean politician) (fl. 1930s), Chilean politician
- Luis Vargas Torres (1855–1887), Ecuadorian revolutionary and national hero

== Sportspeople ==
- Luis Torres (footballer, born 1952), Paraguayan football midfielder
- Luis Torres (footballer, born 1981), Colombian football defender
- Luis Marcelo Torres (born 1997), Argentinean football forward

== See also ==
- Luis Torres, Sons of Anarchy character
- Louis Torres (born 2001), French football left-back
