= Juan Banderas =

Yaqui military leader in Mexico

Juan Ignacio Jusacamea
- húsakameʔa

Captain-general of the Yaqui pueblos
- In office 13 April 1827 – 1831
- Governor: Simón Elías González; Francisco Iriarte; José María Gaxiola
- Preceded by: Office established
- Succeeded by: Office abolished

Personal details
- Born: near Bacatete, Sonora
- Died: January 1833 Arizpe, Sonora, Mexico
- Cause of death: Execution by firing squad
- Mother tongue: Yaqui, Spanish
- Nickname(s): Juan Banderas; El Yaqui

Military service
- Allegiance: Yaqui
- Battles/wars: Yaqui Wars

Juan Ignacio Jusacamea (Yaqui: húsakameʔa; c. late 18th century – 1833), better known by the nicknames Juan Banderas and El Yaqui, was a Yaqui leader who commanded military and political resistance against Mexican authorities in Sonora from 1825 until his execution in 1833. He is best known for his attempt to forge a multi-ethnic indigenous confederation uniting Yaqui, Mayo, Ópata, and Pima groups to defend communal lands, autonomy, and traditional governance against post-independence Mexican policies.

Described by contemporaries as a highly eloquent orator, he invoked symbols of Miguel Hidalgo, the Virgin of Guadalupe, the Aztec Empire, and Moctezuma in his appeals. His nickname Banderas derives from a banner bearing the image of the Virgin of Guadalupe, which he presented as originally belonging to Moctezuma.

== Early life ==
Little firm biographical information survives. Local and later accounts associate him with the Bacatete area near Guaymas, Sonora. Some sources note that he held the ceremonial role of Moroyaut connected with the pascola dancers before rising to military leadership. He appears to have been bilingual or to have worked closely with literate Yaqui associates who produced written materials in his name; contemporary reports stated that he himself did not write.

== Historical context and rise to leadership ==
After Mexican independence the 1824 Constitution and the creation of the Estado de Occidente (covering present-day Sonora, Sinaloa, and southern Arizona) introduced measures that threatened Yaqui communal land tenure and de facto autonomy in their eight traditional pueblos. State authorities sought to impose taxes, conduct censuses, measure and allot lands along the fertile Río Yaqui for non-indigenous colonization, and subordinate the pueblos to outside officials.

Initial protests and attacks on yori (non-indigenous) properties occurred in late 1825. Banderas emerged as the principal leader of the factions that refused to submit, framing the struggle as a defense of territorial integrity and ethnic self-determination. He sought alliances with Mayo, Opata, and Pima groups in an attempt to form a broader indigenous confederation.

== Rebellions ==
=== Initial uprising and confederation attempt (1825–1827) ===
By 1826 Banderas’s forces numbered roughly 1,000–2,000 fighters drawn mainly from Yaqui and Mayo communities. They conducted raids across central and southern Sonora, temporarily disrupting communications and controlling substantial territory.

Mexican forces under Comandante General José Figueroa engaged the rebels near Pitic (modern Hermosillo) in a two-day battle on 6–7 August 1826 and soundly defeated them. On 6 August the forces met between San Lorenzo and Santa Rita, with fighting continuing into the night. Banderas then withdrew to seek reinforcements, leaving a subordinate to hold the position. On the morning of 7 August the remaining Yaqui force was defeated, with heavy losses in dead and prisoners; fleeing groups were further dispersed by Captain Ramon Mier.

Indigenous fighters served on both sides. Banderas’s main support came from Yaqui and Mayo communities. While most Ópata and Pima combatants joined the Mexican forces as auxiliaries. On Figueroa’s side, regular Mexican troops were also supplemented by some “friendly” Yaquis who accepted amnesty. A greater number of Yaquis defected after the Pitic defeat.

Pitic did not end the war as Banderas returned to the field with fresh forces. Fighting continued for little over half a year. On 13 April 1827, at five in the afternoon in the pueblo of Potam near the mouth of the Yaqui River, Banderas and approximately 200 followers formally surrendered their weapons and swore allegiance to Occidente's government. Banderas went down on his knees before Figueroa in sign of submission. Moved by the sight of the starved, ragged warriors and their families, Figueroa accepted a negotiated settlement rather than the absolute extermination demanded by some local authorities. The following day he addressed his troops and exhorted them to treat the Yaquis and Mayos “with love and consideration … like friends in peacetime and enemies in war.” Figueroa granted a full pardon, recognized Banderas as captain-general of the Yaqui pueblos, and arranged a salary for him. The settlement temporarily restored peace and acknowledged a degree of Yaqui autonomy. Local critics denounced Figueroa’s measures as excessively lenient.

=== Interlude, renewed conflict, and execution (1827–1833) ===
The peace proved fragile. In 1828–1829 the Estado de Occidente, and after 1831 the separate state of Sonora moved to abolish the captain-general office, subordinate the eight pueblos to the Buenavista district, impose taxes, and promote individual land titles and non-indigenous settlement. Banderas retained substantial influence and opposed these measures. State attempts in 1831 to hold elections that would remove him were rejected by his supporters.

By 1832 he had acquired firearms and gunpowder and renewed hostilities with a force of roughly 1,000 men, including Opata allies under Dolores Gutiérrez. In December 1832 he was captured near Soyopa. He was taken to Arizpe, summarily tried, and executed by firing squad in early January 1833, together with Gutiérrez and other leaders.
