= Javier Torres Félix =

Mexican mob boss (born 1960)

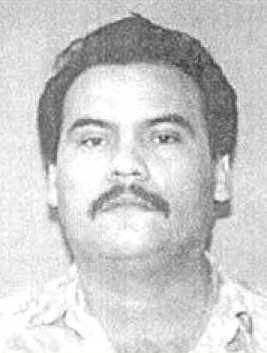
- Born: 19 October 1960 (age 65); Cosalá, Sinaloa, Mexico
- Known for: Drug trafficking Sinaloa Cartel leader
- Successor: Manuel Torres Félix
- Criminal status: Conditional Freedom

Javier Torres Félix (born 19 October 1960) is a Mexican drug lord and former high-ranking leader of the Sinaloa Cartel, a drug trafficking organization. He is the brother of the deceased drug lord Manuel Torres Félix and the former right-hand man of Ismael "El Mayo" Zambada, a top cartel leader. He was released on parole in May 2024.

Born in the state of Sinaloa, Torres Félix entered the drug trade in 1990 under the tutelage of the late Juan Manuel Salcido Uzeta (alias "El Cochiloco"), a Sinaloa Cartel drug trafficker. When his boss was killed, he began to work for Zambada in 1992 and became one of his most trusted associates. In 2001, gunmen of the Tijuana Cartel attempted to kill Torres Félix but they were ultimately unsuccessful. When they failed to find his whereabouts, the gunmen responded by killing 12 villagers at a ranch known as El Cajoncito in his hometown.

He was arrested by the Mexican Army Special Forces in Culiacán in January 2004. He was later extradited to the United States in late 2006, facing charges on drug trafficking. Having completed his sentence, Torres Félix was released and deported back to Mexico. As he crossed the international border, the Mexican authorities arrested him in April 2013 for pending charges on organized crime, homicide, and illegal use of firearms.

== Early life and career ==
Javier Torres Félix was born in Cosalá, Sinaloa, Mexico on 19 October 1960. In 1984, he was arrested in Sinaloa and imprisoned for kidnapping his girlfriend, but he was released months after that. Six years later in 1990, Torres Félix entered the drug trade under the tutelage of the drug lord Juan Manuel Salcido Uzeta (alias "El Cochiloco"), a high-ranking Sinaloa Cartel leader who was killed that same year. In June 1990, he was arrested again by the Mexican Army in Mazatlán while in possession of 4 AK-47s and with over 800 kilograms (1,800 lb) of marijuana. He was released from prison a year later. He started working for Ismael "El Mayo" Zambada in 1992, and was thereby placed in the most-wanted list of the Drug Enforcement Administration (DEA). While in California in 1992, he was arrested for drug trafficking but obtained his release five years later and returned to Mexico to continue to work for the Sinaloa Cartel. In Quintana Roo in May 1997, Torres Félix was arrested once again while in possession of 2 kilograms (4.4 pounds) of cocaine but was released in 1998.

According to reports by the Procuraduría General de la República (PGR), gunmen of the Tijuana Cartel attempted to kill Torres Félix and his brother Manuel on 14 February 2001 at El Limoncito de Alayá, a ranch in the municipality of Cosalá, Sinaloa. After failing to find both of them, the gunmen sought revenge by killing twelve villagers from the area. Reportedly, the Tijuana Cartel leader Ramón Arellano Félix ordered the attack after a dispute over drug shipments. Later that year in October, Torres Félix and "El Mayo" Zambada avoided capture from the Mexican Army and the PGR. In July 2003, the United States Department of Justice indicted "El Mayo" Zambada, Vicente Zambada Niebla, and Torres Félix for conspiracy to traffic and distribute cocaine to the United States from Mexico. That indictment specifically stated that from August 2001 to June 2002, his criminal organization provided 1,003 kilograms of cocaine to the New York–New Jersey area (with an estimated value of US$17 million); 1,770 kilograms of cocaine to the Chicago area (with an estimated value of US$30 million); 23 kilograms of cocaine to the state of California (with an estimated value of US$391,000). In the District of Columbia and the Los Angeles area, several other indictments were filed against Torres Félix for his involvement in drug trafficking and money distribution on behalf of the cartel. The Los Angeles indictment charged the drug lord with importing and distributing 5 kilograms of cocaine, and distributing millions of dollars to finance criminal distribution cells in the city. By then, the U.S. government had identified Torres Félix as one of the top lieutenants of "El Mayo" Zambada and as a leading distributor of multi-ton shipments of narcotics. On 17 May 2007, the United States Department of the Treasury sanctioned Torres Félix under the Foreign Narcotics Kingpin Designation Act (sometimes referred to simply as the "Kingpin Act"), for his involvement in drug trafficking along with eleven other international criminals and six foreign entities. The act prohibited U.S. citizens and companies from doing any kind of business activity with him, and virtually froze all his assets in the U.S.

== Arrest ==
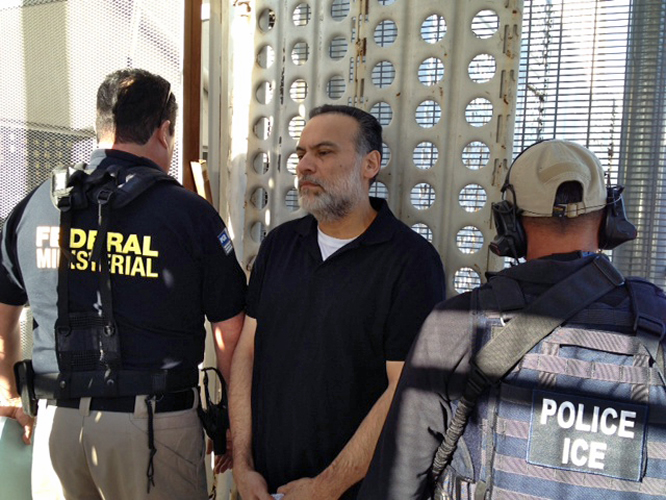
Torres Félix being deported by ICE agents to Mexico (2013).

On the morning of 27 January 2004, a commando of the Grupo Aeromóvil de Fuerzas Especiales (GAFE), the Mexican Army Special Forces, intercepted Torres Félix at a rural community known as La Tula, just outside the city of Culiacán, Sinaloa. To avoid the capture of their boss, at least 30 of Torres Félix's gunmen confronted the GAFE soldiers as the drug lord fled to one of his many safe houses in Culiacán. But Torres Félix was later arrested at Colinas de San Miguel neighborhood in Culiacán. That same afternoon, the Army transferred the drug lord to Mexico City and handed him over to the PGR. Prior to his arrest, Torres Félix was widely regarded as one of the top leaders of the Sinaloa Cartel, and the right-hand man of "El Mayo" Zambada. He operated in the southern parts of Sinaloa and oversaw drug trafficking shipments through Baja California Sur and the United States. Following the arrest, his brother Manuel Torres Félix took his position in the cartel and became one of the most trusted men of El Mayo Zambada.

Torres Félix was imprisoned at Reclusorio Norte in Mexico City at around 10:00 a.m. on 28 January 2004 under solitary confinement. He was kept under tight security and was supervised 24 hours a day, seven days a week. Though initially planned to be transferred to a maximum security prison like Federal Social Readaptation Center No. 1 (also known as "La Palma") due to his criminal profile and importance, Torres Félix was kept in Reclusorio Norte for most of his prison time in Mexico. The U.S. government, however, received intelligence reports that said that Torres Félix had reportedly paid a 1.2 million dollar bribe to escape from prison on 25 December 2004. For almost three years, he tried to stop his extradition process but was ultimately unsuccessful.

Some objects that were confiscated from him during his arrest are on display at the Museo del Enervante in Mexico City.

=== Extradition and sentence ===
On 1 May 2006, a Mexican federal court approved the extradition of Torres Félix to the United States, where he faced drug trafficking charges. On 30 November 2006, he was extradited to McAllen, Texas pending charges on conspiracy to traffic multi-ton shipments of cocaine to the U.S. from Mexico. On 9 September 2008, he was found guilty of the charges and was sentenced to 126 months in a federal prison. He was first imprisoned at Federal Correctional Complex, Yazoo City in the state of Mississippi, but was later transferred to the Federal Correctional Institution, Beckley in West Virginia, where he served a 6-year sentence. According to extraofficial reports, Torres Félix collaborated with U.S. authorities by helping them identify other high-ranking lieutenants within the Sinaloa Cartel in exchange for a shorter sentence. On 12 April 2013 after completing his sentence, Torres Félix was released and deported to Mexico.

=== Deportation and re-arrest ===
Having fulfilled his sentence in the United States, the U.S. authorities deported Torres Félix to Mexico on 12 April 2013. As he crossed the U.S.-Mexico border into Mexicali, he was arrested by the Baja California authorities for organized crime charges, homicide, and for illegal use of weaponry under Mexican law. He was then flown to the Segunda Región Militar installations of the Mexican Armed Forces in the state before he was presented to the SEIDO, Mexico's investigatory organized crime division, in Mexico City. He was kept in custody for at least 70 days. On 3 June 2013, Torres Félix was transferred to the Federal Social Readaptation Center No. 11, a maximum-security prison in Hermosillo, Sonora. Three days later the drug lord was finally transferred to another maximum-security prison, the Federal Social Readaptation Center No. 1, in Almoloya de Juárez, State of Mexico. In January 2014, a Mexican federal judge ordered the PGR to define the legal standing of Torres Félix in 60 days given that the drug lord was granted an appeal.

== Family ==
His son Joel Torres Jiménez was subject of several murder attempts and attacks. On 4 April 2008, he was injured from gunshot wounds at the Guadalupe Victoria neighborhood in Culiacán. Two years later on 18 January 2010, he was kidnapped but released a couple of days later. On 27 February 2010 at Las Quintas neighborhood in Culiacán, unidentified gunmen attempted to kill Torres Jiménez while he was traveling in his vehicle. The attack injured him and a woman, and killed the passenger. (Note: Some media reports incorrectly stated that Joel Torres Jiménez was killed in this attack.) On 10 June 2012, Torres Félix's son was attacked again at Ignacio Allende neighborhood in Culiacán by several armed men. His nephew Atanacio Torres Acosta (son of Torres Félix's brother Manuel) was killed by gunmen on 19 April 2008 in Culiacán. His son Misael Torres Urrea (alias "El M2") was arrested by soldiers of the Mexican Army at his home in Culiacán, Sinaloa on 2 October 2014. His daughter, Marisol Torres Urrea, died Friday, 1 de May, 2015, the cause of death was a long fight against a deadly sickness named lupus erythematosus.

== See also ==
- Mexican drug war
