= Hortensia Torres =

Catalan anarchist and anti-fascist (1924–1989)

- Born: Hortensia Torres Cuadrado; 1924; Lleida, Catalonia, Spain
- Died: 6 June 1989 (aged 64–65); Tolosa, Occitania, France
- Organisations: Red Cross; International Antifascist Solidarity
- Movement: Anarchism, anti-Francoism
- Father: Josep Torres

Hortensia Torres Cuadrado (1924–1989) was a Catalan anarchist and anti-fascist activist. She was a member of the anti-Francoist movement and agitated against the Francoist dictatorship in Barcelona and from exile in Tolosa.

== Biography ==
Hortensia Torres Cuadrado was born in 1924, in the Catalan city of Lleida. The daughter of Josep Torres, a progressive schoolteacher of the Ferrer movement, she was raised into an anarchist family. At the age of 15, she and her family fled the Nationalists' Catalonia Offensive into exile. They were interned in the Argelers concentration camp. After the Nazi occupation of France in 1940, Hortensia Torres was forced back to Spain, while he father was deported to Nazi Germany, where he died the following year.

In Barcelona, Torres lived with her aunt and worked as an ironer. She participated in the underground anti-Francoist movement and helped shelter fugitives. She remained in Spain until 1957, when she again fled Spain back to France. She settled in Tolosa, where she worked for the Red Cross and International Antifascist Solidarity (SIA). In 1968, she secretly crossed the border back into Spain to participate in the protests of 1968. In the 1970s, her son joined the Internationalist Revolutionary Action Groups (GIRA) and was imprisoned for his anti-Francoist activism.

In 1986, Torres was interviewed about her life and activism for the documentary De Toda la Vida. On International Workers' Day of 1988, she participated in a demonstration organised by the National Confederation of Labour (CNT) in Madrid. There she also visited her son in prison. Hortensia Torres died in Tolosa on 6 June 1989, at the age of 65.

== Bibliography ==
- Íñiguez, Miguel (2001). "Torres, Hortensia". Esbozo de una enciclopedia histórica del anarquismo español (in Spanish). Madrid: Fundación de Estudios Libertarios Anselmo Lorenzo. p. 597. ISBN 9788486864453. OCLC 807322760.
- Dupuy, Rolf (24 July 2024) [23 April 2013]. "TORRES CUADRADO, Hortensia". Los de la Sierra (in French).
