= Estado de Occidente =

State of Mexico (1824–1830)

- State of Mexico
- 1824 - 1830
- Flag

- Sonora y Sinaloa within Mexico
- Capital: El Fuerte; Cosalá (unknown date); Álamos (1828-1830)
  - Type: Federal Republic
- History
  - Established: 1824
  - Disestablished: 1830
Preceded by	Succeeded by
Nueva Navarra	Sonora; Sinaloa
- Today part of: Mexico: Sinaloa; Sonora; United States: Arizona; New Mexico

Estado de Occidente (English: Western State; also known as Sonora y Sinaloa) was a Mexican state established in 1824. The constitution was drafted in that year and the government was initially established with its capital at El Fuerte, Sinaloa. The first governor was Juan Miguel Riesgo. The state consisted of modern Sonora and Sinaloa, and also modern Arizona more or less south of the Gila River (although in much of this area the Yaqui, Pima, Apaches, and other native inhabitants at certain times did not recognize the rule of the state).

The constitution was established in 1825 with one of its principles being the making of all inhabitants of the state citizens. This was resented by the Yaqui since they now had to pay taxes, which they had been exempt from before. The Yaqui also considered themselves possessed of sovereignty and territorial rights which were threatened by the state's new constitution.

This led to a new outbreak of war between the Mexicans and the Yaquis (see Yaqui Wars) with Juan Banderas as the leader of the Yaqui forces. As a result of this war the capital of Occidente was moved to Cosalá and then in 1828 to Álamos.

Sonora and Sinaloa were again split into two separate states in 1830.

== One state: Sonora y Sinaloa ==
Under its Constitution of 1824, Sonora y Sinaloa was a single state of the Mexican Republic. The federal constitution used the name "Sonora y Sinaloa." However the state constitution adopted on 31 October 1825 used the name Estado de Occidente. The Sonora y Sinaloa state capital was located at El Fuerte, Sinaloa. The first Governor of Sonora y Sinaloa was the Sonoran Juan Miguel Riesgo.

== Two states: Sonora and Sinaloa ==
On 30 September 1830, due to constant internal disputes, the state was divided into two states: Sonora and Sinaloa. The territory of Sinaloa corresponds to that of the modern-day state of the same name. The territory of Sonora includes all of the modern state of the same name with the exception of the areas that were ceded to the United States during the Mexican Cession and the Gadsden Purchase in 1848 and 1854 respectively.

== Mexican-American War and territory ==
Sonora of the 1820s extended north beyond the present-day United States–Mexico border. Settlements existed only in the extreme south of the current state of Arizona and the northern frontier was not defined. Maps from the period show the northern border above today's international border, as far as either the Gila River or the Colorado River in the Grand Canyon. The Mexican-American War, the 1848 Treaty of Guadalupe Hidalgo, and especially the Gadsden Purchase established the present border.

== Sources ==
- Spicer, Edward H. Cycles of Conquest. Tucson: University of Arizona Press, 1962.
