= Cosalá =

City in the Mexican state of Sinaloa

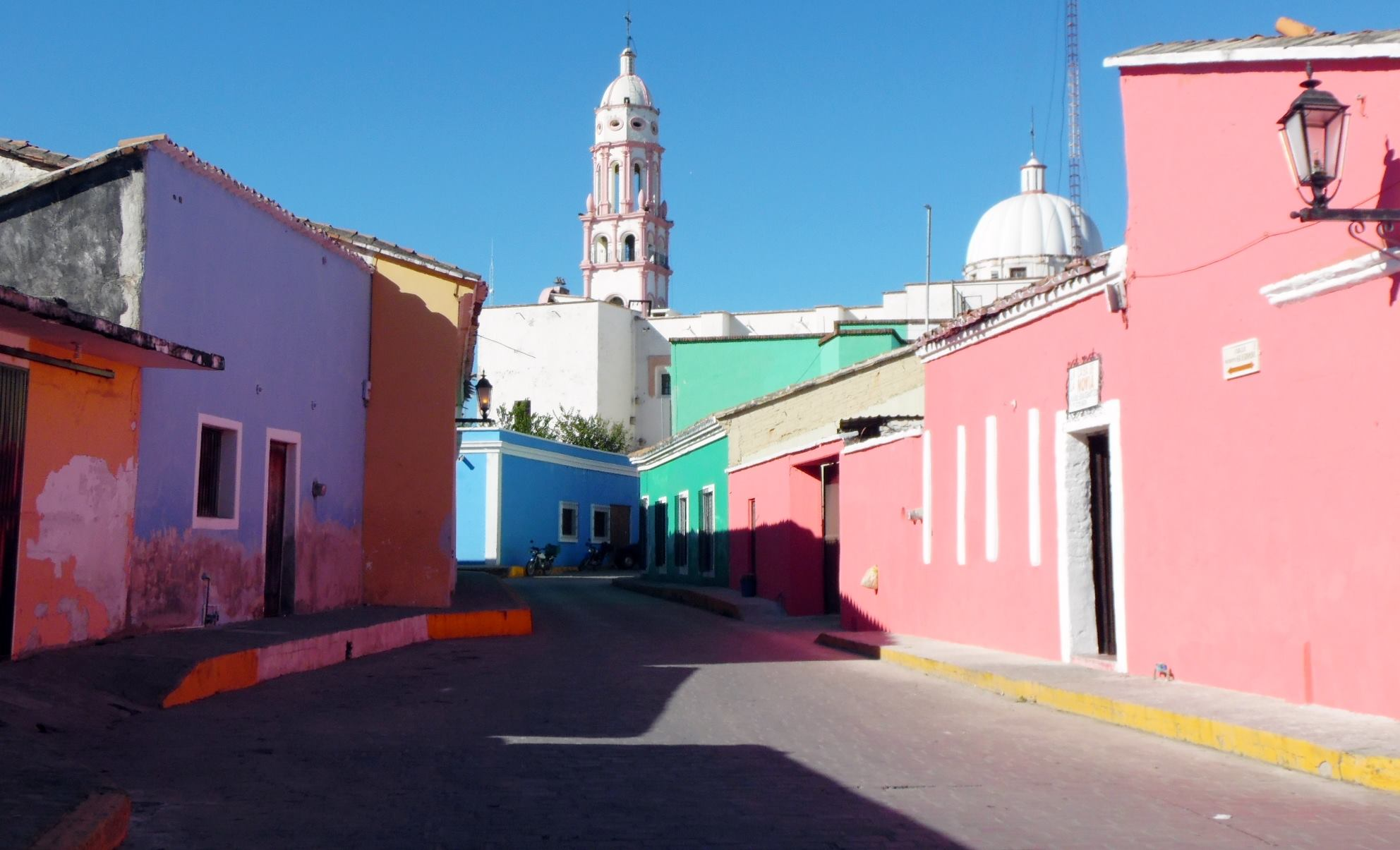

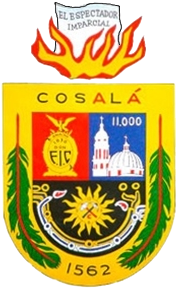
- Seal

- Location in Mexico Cosalá (Mexico)
- Coordinates: 24°24′45″N 106°41′30″W
- Country: Mexico
- State: Sinaloa
- Municipality: Cosalá

Government
  - Municipal president: Mario Padilla (PRI)
- Elevation: 380 m (1,250 ft)

Population (2010)
  - Total: 6,577
- Time zone: UTC-7 (Mountain Standard Time)
- Postal code: 80700 to
- Website: Cosalá Government page

Cosalá (Spanish pronunciation: [kosa'la]) is a small city and the seat of its surrounding municipality in the Mexican state of Sinaloa. It stands at 24°24′45″N 106°41′30″W. The city reported 6,577 inhabitants in the 2010 census.

== Overview ==
The Royal of the Eleven Thousand Virgins, shortened its name to the Royal Mines of Cosalá is the municipal seat.

Francisco Iriarte y Conde, governor of Occidente State declared Cosalá the capital of the western state in 1826. This was due to the growing threat of attack on the former capital El Fuerte, Sinaloa by the forces of Juan Banderas, leader of the Yaqui at that point in the Yaqui Wars.

Iriarte introduced printing in Sonora and Sinaloa and it was in Cosalá that the first newspaper of Sinaloa, "The Impartial Spectator" was published.

In its surroundings are attractions such as the Vado Hondo waterfall and town reservoirs "Comedero" and "El Salto" a few miles from town. Both these lakes are stocked with largemouth bass. The Museum of Mineralogy mainly displays photographs and documents on the history of mining in Sinaloa.

Cosalá was the dominant region in the social and political life of the State of Sinaloa until it became its capital in the early independent Mexico.

== Geography ==
Cosalá is located 155 km. from state capital Culiacán.

=== Climate ===
Cosalá is classified as having a Köppen Tropical Wet and Dry climate (Aw) despite being situated about 1 degree above the Tropic of Cancer. Most municipalities to the north of Cosalá, such as Culiacán, have semi-arid to arid climates, as one moves towards the Sonoran–Sinaloan transition subtropical dry forest, and into the Sonoran Desert.

Cosalá experiences much greater diurnal temperature variations than most Tropical Wet and Dry climates, especially during the winter months, where temperatures regularly drop as low as 10C in January and February (compare this to Mazatlán, located about 1 degree south, inside the Tropic of Cancer, where nighttime temperatures in January and February are about 15C on average). Daytime temperatures also tend to be hotter than most locations further south (highs approaching 37C in May/Jun, compared to 30C-33C for Mazatlán), and as such, Cosala's climate behaves more similarly to a semi-arid climate, in this regard, than a truly tropical climate. The record low temperature of 1C, is also substantially colder than Mazatlan's 7.5C.

Climate data for Cosalá (1951–2010)
Month	Jan	Feb	Mar	Apr	May	Jun	Jul	Aug	Sep	Oct	Nov	Dec	Year
Record high °C (°F)	44.0 (111.2)	42.0 (107.6)	44.0 (111.2)	43.0 (109.4)	43.0 (109.4)	43.0 (109.4)	41.0 (105.8)	40.0 (104.0)	40.0 (104.0)	45.0 (113.0)	43.0 (109.4)	43.0 (109.4)	45.0 (113.0)
Mean daily maximum °C (°F)	28.1 (82.6)	30.2 (86.4)	32.9 (91.2)	35.6 (96.1)	37.3 (99.1)	36.5 (97.7)	33.8 (92.8)	33.2 (91.8)	32.9 (91.2)	32.9 (91.2)	31.3 (88.3)	28.3 (82.9)	32.8 (91.0)
Daily mean °C (°F)	19.3 (66.7)	20.3 (68.5)	22.2 (72.0)	24.9 (76.8)	27.3 (81.1)	29.4 (84.9)	28.2 (82.8)	27.8 (82.0)	27.5 (81.5)	26.0 (78.8)	22.5 (72.5)	20.0 (68.0)	24.6 (76.3)
Mean daily minimum °C (°F)	10.4 (50.7)	10.4 (50.7)	11.6 (52.9)	14.3 (57.7)	17.3 (63.1)	22.2 (72.0)	22.7 (72.9)	22.4 (72.3)	22.2 (72.0)	19.1 (66.4)	13.7 (56.7)	11.6 (52.9)	16.5 (61.7)
Record low °C (°F)	3.0 (37.4)	1.0 (33.8)	3.0 (37.4)	4.0 (39.2)	9.0 (48.2)	15.0 (59.0)	15.0 (59.0)	15.0 (59.0)	13.5 (56.3)	5.0 (41.0)	4.0 (39.2)	3.0 (37.4)	1.0 (33.8)
Average precipitation mm (inches)	24.6 (0.97)	13.9 (0.55)	10.3 (0.41)	5.1 (0.20)	5.4 (0.21)	117.7 (4.63)	293.3 (11.55)	257.6 (10.14)	185.5 (7.30)	84.2 (3.31)	34.1 (1.34)	52.0 (2.05)	1,083.7 (42.67)
Average precipitation days (≥ 0.1 mm)	2.0	1.1	0.8	0.4	0.4	5.3	17.6	16.3	11.8	3.6	1.7	3.3	64.3
Source: Servicio Meteorológico Nacional

== Attractions ==
- The Gruta México, a giant cave with stalactites and stalagmites
- The Santa Ursula Temple, built in the 18th century which represents the most significant church of Cosalá
- The Museum of Mining and History, unique in the country because it traces the mining history of the State with collections of:
  - documents
  - old photographs
  - pre-Hispanic and colonial metallic objects
  - mineral samples
  - books
  - weapons
  - carriages and horseshoes from the 18th and 19th centuries

Cosalá, Sinaloa, was named a "Pueblo Mágico" in 2005 for its natural environment, cultural riches, and historical relevance.
