= Serafín Zambada Ortiz =

Mexican drug trafficker

- Born: 27 May 1990 (age 35); San Diego, California, U.S.
- Other name: "Sera"
- Education: Autonomous University of Sinaloa
- Organization: Sinaloa Cartel
- Criminal penalty: Drug trafficking
- Criminal status: Convicted and released (2018)
- Spouse: Karime Ellameli Torres Acosta (m. 2006)
- Parent(s): Ismael "El Mayo" Zambada and Leticia Ortiz

Serafín Zambada Ortiz (born 27 May 1990) is an American convicted drug trafficker and high-ranking member of the Sinaloa Cartel, a criminal group based in Sinaloa. He is the son of Ismael "El Mayo" Zambada, top leader of the Sinaloa Cartel. He is married to Karime Ellameli Torres Acosta, the daughter of the late Manuel Torres Félix, another Sinaloa Cartel leader. Zambada Ortiz was active on social media, where he posted pictures of his extravagant lifestyle.

On 20 November 2013, he was arrested by the Drug Enforcement Administration (DEA) at the border crossing in Nogales, Arizona. The United States charged him with importing large sums of cocaine and marijuana into the United States from Mexico. He was sentenced to five and a half years in prison, an unusually low sentence for a high-profile drug case. On 11 September 2018, he was released from prison.

== Early life and career ==
Zambada Ortiz was born in San Diego, California, United States on 27 May 1990 to Leticia Ortiz (mother) and Ismael "El Mayo" Zambada (father), one of the top leaders of the Sinaloa Cartel, a Mexican drug trafficking organization. He grew up in Sinaloa and spent some years in Phoenix, Arizona. Zambada Ortiz was an agronomy student at the Autonomous University of Sinaloa in Culiacán, Sinaloa. (Note: Another source states he was born in Coronado, California, a resort city within the San Diego County.) He married Karime Ellameli Torres Acosta, daughter of Manuel Torres Félix ("The Crazy One"), another former Sinaloa Cartel drug lord, on 6 February 2006. (Note: Other sources state that his wife's name is Yameli Torres Acosta.) Torres Félix, brother of Javier Torres Félix (now imprisoned), was killed in a gunfight with the Mexican Army in October 2012. Zambada Ortiz had a close relationship with Ismael Zambada Imperial (alias "El Mayito Gordo"), one of his other brothers from another of his father's mistresses.

On Twitter and Facebook, Zambada Ortiz uploaded pictures of his extravagant lifestyle filled with luxurious watches, trucks, golden-encrusted weapons, and exotic animals. The photographs Zambada Ortiz uploaded on social media helped the U.S. authorities identify and implicate him with other Sinaloa Cartel associates. In particular, Zambada Ortiz had several pictures with numerous members of Los Ántrax, an armed squadron of the Sinaloa Cartel. He also has a narcocorrido song from Enigma Norteño, a musical group from Sinaloa, about him. In the drug ballad, Zambada Ortiz is described as a humble man who enjoys sports, weapons, and drinking. The song concludes with a greeting to Jesús Alfredo and Iván Archivaldo Guzmán Salazar, sons of Joaquín "El Chapo" Guzmán.

=== Criminal charges ===
In September 2013, Zambada Ortiz was charged with conspiracy to traffic cocaine and methamphetamine from Mexico to the United States through a California grand jury indictment. The court alleged that he imported at least 500 grams of methamphetamine and 5 kilograms of cocaine, but no further details were provided. If sentenced for such charges, he will face one to ten years in prison in the United States and forfeit all the drug proceeds he earned from his criminal activities. Zambada Ortiz was also identified by U.S. authorities by his alias "Sera". However, he is not wanted for any criminal charges by Mexican law enforcement. His brother Vicente Zambada Niebla, arrested in Mexico City in 2009, was extradited to the United States and is awaiting trial in the state of Illinois. His uncle Jesús Zambada García (alias "El Rey") was arrested by Mexican authorities in 2008 and extradited to the U.S. on 2012. Zambada Ortiz's father Ismael "El Mayo" Zambada continues to lead the Sinaloa Cartel following the arrest of Joaquín "El Chapo" Guzmán, his former co-leader.

== Arrest and case ==
While crossing the international border through Nogales, Arizona from Mexico to do some Christmas shopping, Zambada Ortiz and his wife were arrested by federal agents of the Drug Enforcement Administration (DEA) on 20 November 2013. His wife was released shortly thereafter but he was sent to a prison in Tucson, Arizona. The September charges against Zambada Ortiz had been kept confidential, catching him by surprise while he attempted to cross into the United States legally. On 25 November, the case was moved from Tucson to the U.S. District Court for the Southern District of California in San Diego, California. Two days later, he appeared in court in San Diego and pleaded not guilty to the drug trafficking charges. The magistrate ordered Zambada Ortiz to be held without bail and told his attorneys that they could ask for a bail in the next hearing, initially scheduled for 3 January 2014. Outside the courtroom, his attorney stated that the Facebook and Twitter accounts that were used to identify his connection with the Sinaloa Cartel were not his.

On 1 January 2014, Zambada Ortiz turned down his right to a speedy trial after deciding that his legal team wanted to continue gathering evidence. His lawyers argued that there was more evidence surrounding the case that needed to be investigated and analyzed by the team. Imprisoned in a maximum security cell, Zambada Ortiz asked to delay his trial to mid-March 2014. However, the San Diego federal court judge refused to postpone the trial and ordered the hearing for 17 January and the case for 3 February 2014. The hearing was postponed for 5 February 2014 because new evidence was presented by the DEA a day before the hearing. The day before, however, the hearing was postponed once again for 28 February 2014. The case was scheduled for 21 March 2014. Following the case, many of the details surrounding his charges remained in virtual secrecy (a protective order was issued for the case, meaning that the details were not allowed to be disclosed to the public). However, there was an immense amount of evidences presented by the U.S. government against Zambada Ortiz the day of the case. U.S. District Judge Dana Sabraw said that the case was "complex", and that this forced the deadlines of the case to be extended (it was unknown if more details from the charges were to be released to the public). This was likely due to the fact that Zambada Ortiz is not a typical defendant because he is the son of Ismael "El Mayo" Zambada, the leader of the Sinaloa Cartel and one of the world's most-wanted men.

In April 2014, his case was moved to a federal district court in Los Angeles, California. Zambada Ortiz was expected to appear in court on 15 September 2014. However, on that date, the hearing was postponed to 5 December 2014. On 26 September 2014, Zambada pleaded guilty in San Diego to conspiring to buy 100 kilograms of cocaine and over 1,000 kilograms of marijuana in Sinaloa for U.S. distribution. As part of the agreement, he forfeited US$250,000 from the drug proceeds, and prosecutors dropped the methamphetamine charges Zambada was initially accused of. The session was held under heavy security with additional guards in the courtroom and metal detector entrances. Three female family members attended the court session. Zambada's defense attorney decline to comment on the case. In one of the rows, the attorney of José Rodrigo Aréchiga Gamboa (another high-ranking Sinaloa Cartel member implicated in Zambada's case) took notes. Zambada's sentence was scheduled for 22 May 2015; he faces from 10 years to life in prison with a US$10 million fine.

Though Zambada Ortiz was registered as an inmate at the Metropolitan Correctional Center (MCC) in San Diego since his arrest, it was leaked to the press in February 2015 that he was no longer there. Three months before pleading guilty of the charges, on 3 July 2014, sources within the MCC confirmed that had been transferred elsewhere. According to the prison's online database, Zambada Ortiz is not registered at the MCC. His register number 13069–408 at the Federal Bureau of Prisons (BOP) says that he is not in custody. It was possible that Zambada Ortiz was taken from the MCC and introduced to the United States Federal Witness Protection Program. If that was the case, he was likely sent to a residence where he was kept under surveillance with a GPS electronic monitoring bracelet.

== Sentence and release ==
Zambada Ortiz was sentenced to five and a half years in prison on 20 March 2018. While the prosecution stated that Zambada Ortiz's crimes were significant in nature, the hearing was devoid of the typical rhetoric of other high-profile drug-related cases, which include arguments of how much time a defendant should spend behind bars. The prosecution lowered his sentence from the minimum 10-year conviction because they considered that Zambada Ortiz's tumultuous youth, his "genuine remorse", the lack of violence in his criminal career, and the letters the prosecution received from his family and friends who described him as a helpful and kind person. During his hearing, Zambada Ortiz apologized for his crimes and stated that he realized that being involved in the drug trade negatively affected people's lives. He said he was ready to continue with his life and raise his two children with his wife. He also stated that he would finish his college education and help his mother's lychee and mango farm.

On 11 September 2018, Zambada Ortiz was released from prison after fulfilling his time, only eight months after his sentence. He was initially scheduled to be released on 29 May 2019, but was able to get an early release due to good conduct and because of a letter his mother sent to the prosecution asking for a softer sentence. It was unknown if Zambada Ortiz's defense struck a deal with the prosecution in exchange for a reduced term since the indictments of the case are sealed and not available to the public. Since Zambada Ortiz was a U.S. citizen, he was simply escorted to the entrance of the prison and released. It is not known who picked him up at the prison or where he would relocate.

== See also ==
- Mexican drug war
