= René Velázquez Valenzuela =

Mexican drug lord and hitman

- Born: Rene velázquez Valenzuela; 08/26/1970
- Died: 30 October 2016; Culiacán, Sinaloa, Mexico
- Cause of death: Gunshot wounds
- Resting place: El Salado, Culiacán Municipality, Mexico
- Other names: El Sargento Phoenix; El Gato Negro; El Talibán
- Occupation: Hitman
- Employer(s): Los Ántrax (suspected); Sinaloa Cartel (suspected)
- Predecessor: José Rodrigo Aréchiga Gamboa

René Velázquez Valenzuela (died 30 October 2016) was a Mexican suspected hitman and high-ranking member of the Sinaloa Cartel, a criminal group based in Sinaloa. According to security forces, Velázquez was a senior member within Los Ántrax, one of the Sinaloa Cartel's assassin squads responsible for fighting rival gangs, guarding drug shipments, and protecting the family of Ismael "El Mayo" Zambada, one of Mexico's most-wanted men. Velázquez was known for his long beard and shaved head.

Originally a truck driver in Sinaloa, he was recruited by Los Ántrax in 2008 and became a trusted member due to his adept combat abilities in the field. He was arrested later that year after turning himself in to allow his boss José Rodrigo Aréchiga Gamboa (alias "El Chino Ántrax") to escape during a shootout. While in prison, authorities suspected that he controlled one of the prison sectors. He was released in 2014 and re-joined Los Ántrax as its second-in-command. In 2016, he was killed in a clash with the Mexican Army in Culiacán.

== Personal life and career ==
René Velázquez Valenzuela was known by his aliases El Sargento Phoenix (The Phoenix Sergeant), El Talibán (The Taliban), and El Gato Negro (Black Cat). His nickname El Talibán was given to him for his appearance and violent personality, likely an allusion to the Taliban. He was known in the criminal underworld for the way that he executed his victims and for his long beard. In several pictures, Velázquez wore a turban and posed next to a portrait of Osama bin Laden. His behavior and lifestyle were publicized through online pictures and through narcocorridos (drug ballads) about him. Several singers and music groups wrote songs detailing his personal life, including Larry Hernandez, Gerardo Ortiz, Ariel Camacho, Enigma Norteño, Jorge Santa Cruz, and Los Nuevos Rebeldes. Songs described Velázquez as a violent person adept in using multiple types of weapons. He was also described as someone who preferred black clothing, shaving his head, and having a long beard.

Prior to his involvement in organized crime, he worked as a truck driver in Sinaloa. In 2008, however, he joined a hitman squad known as Los Ántrax and held to a senior role as one of its first members. Los Ántrax was a group of assassins aligned to the Sinaloa Cartel, a criminal group based in Sinaloa. It was formed that year by José Rodrigo Aréchiga Gamboa (alias "El Chino Ántrax") and other members to provide armed protection to the family of Ismael "El Mayo" Zambada, one of Mexico's most-wanted men. The group originated after the Sinaloa Cartel and the Beltrán-Leyva Cartel broke their alliance in 2008. Velázquez oversaw the street drug distributions in southern Culiacán, Sinaloa before becoming a dedicated squad member of Zambada's family security force. He was later tasked with protecting Ismael Zambada Imperial (alias "El Mayito Gordo"), Ismael Zambada Sicairos (alias "El Mayito Flaco"), and Vicente Zambada Niebla (alias "El Vicentillo"), three of El Mayo's children. When he joined Los Ántrax, he shaved his head and grew his beard to show loyalty to El Vicentillo, his former boss and friend. El Mayito Gordo was the one who originally contacted Velázquez to join Los Ántrax.

As a high-ranking member, he reported directly to Aréchiga Gamboa and Eliseo Imperial Castro (alias "El Cheyo Ántrax"). Velázquez gained the trust of his superiors due to his successes at leading Los Ántrax during offensive operations, and for his violent methods and tactical strategies in the field. Los Ántrax were responsible for fighting off rival gangsters of the Sinaloa Cartel, which included the Beltrán Leyva Cartel and Los Zetas, as well as protecting drug shipments owned by the Sinaloa Cartel. With the arrest of El Vicentillo in 2009, the Sinaloa Cartel instructed Velázquez to form a perimeter of scouts across in Culiacán Municipality. The purpose of this group was to report on law enforcement activities or incursions from rival criminal groups.

== Arrest and release ==
Shortly after joining Los Ántrax, Velázquez was involved in a shootout with the Mexican Army in Culiacán that resulted in his arrest. According to law enforcement reports from 25 February 2008, Velázquez opened fire at an Army unit, which triggered a shootout between his men and the Army in Miguel Hidalgo street. The Army responded to the aggression by shooting at the vehicle's tires and forcing Velázquez's vehicle to a stop. He was arrested along with his brother José Fidel Velázquez Valenzuela, Francisco Angulo Estrada, and Marco Antonio López Armendáriz. When the Army proceeded to apprehend him, he was in possession of multiple firearms, including an AK-47 on his lap, 40 mm grenade, and 5.7×28 mm pistol. His accomplices had other weapons in their possession, and the trunk of the vehicle had additional firearms and ammunition. Investigators also discovered 17 grams (0.60 oz) of marijuana in the vehicle; Velázquez's post-arrest medical examination confirmed he was addicted to marijuana.

Velázquez told law enforcement that the weapons were owned by Octavio Villarreal (alias "El Salchi"), a friend of his. Velázquez said he offered to take care of the weapons for him, and that he decided to keep them in his vehicle because the Army was raiding homes in the neighborhood days prior to the incident and he was worried they would raid his home and find the weapons there. He tried to explain to law enforcement that his brother José Fidel was with him because his car would not turn on and he helped him get it to a mechanic, who he claimed was López Armendáriz. Velázquez explained that they were arrested after he offered to drive his brother and the mechanic home. In addition, Velázquez complained that when he surrendered, the Army units kept shooting at the vehicle in an attempt to kill him. Velázquez claimed he had to throw himself to the ground to avoid the gunfire. He then said that the soldiers kicked and pistol-whipped him. The Army rejected Velázquez's version and stated they acted in accordance to the law once Velázquez attacked them. Investigators suspected Velázquez fired at the Army to distract them and allow El Chino Ántrax to escape the scene. He then reportedly turned himself in by walking towards the officers with a grenade in his hand. He was imprisoned at the Penal de Aguaruto, a low-security prison in Aguaruto, Culiacán, and held under federal charges.

In trial, he was found guilty on 26 April 2011 of illegal possession of firearms, cartridges, and grenades, illegal possession of military-exclusive weapons, and drug possession. He was originally sentenced to 8 years, 10 months, and 3 days, but his defense appealed the decision and was able to reduce the term to 6 years, 10 months, and 6 days after the judge considered that Velázquez had good conduct in prison. Velázquez told the prosecution he would reintegrate himself in society again by working as a deliveryman for a local restaurant upon his release. While in prison, however, Velázquez reportedly held a leadership role among the inmates, and presumably "controlled" module five, one of the prison's sectors that held Sinaloa Cartel-affiliated criminals wanted for organized crime and drug trafficking. He also enjoyed several luxuries as an inmate; he had access to social media and uploaded pictures of his lifestyle behind bars. In one of the pictures he uploaded, Velázquez was seen walking along the prison yard surrounded by an entourage of inmates. In other pictures, he was smoking a marijuana joint, playing with a raccoon pet, and enjoying visits from his friends, like Roque Landeros (alias "Roque Ántrax"), (Note: Roque Landeros was killed in a shootout with rival gangsters in Culiacán, Sinaloa, in February 2012.) another suspected assassin of Los Ántrax.

In August 2012, Velázquez's defense issued a writ of amparo to request a reduction to his sentence. His accomplices also did the same. A court in Mazatlán, Sinaloa, however, rejected the motion issued by Velázquez but granted it for his accomplices. They were released immediately. Velázquez remained in prison until 22 August 2014, when Sinaloa district judge Alba Lorenia Galaviz Ramírez granted his release. (Note: Sources incorrectly stated that he allegedly escaped from prison.) His defense cited Article 84 of Mexico's Federal Penal Code, which grants inmates immediate release from prison if they have fulfilled 2/3 of their sentence for intentional crimes, or 1/2 of their sentence for unintentional crimes. Velázquez was also required to pass a personality test showing he was ready to return to the community and not commit crimes again, have good conduct, and agree to repay the damages caused in the crimes he committed.

== Shootout and death ==
At 4:00 a.m. on 30 October 2016, Velázquez was killed in a clash with the Mexican Army in Las Quintas neighborhood in Culiacán. It occurred on Miguel Hidalgo street on the intersection with Esteban Flores and Alejandro Quijano streets. According to law enforcement reports, the Army was initially heading to Sinaloa, a town in Culiacán Municipality, after receiving a report of armed men in the area. As they were heading there, the Army overheard gunshots near the 9th Military Zone in Culiacán, and re-routed their efforts back to the city. Approximately 70 soldiers in at least 15 vehicles headed to the scene; two tankettes arrived later when called as reinforcements. After arriving at Las Quintas, the Army discovered that several leaders of Los Ántrax, including Velázquez, were at a home gathering.

When they noticed law enforcement's presence, several members of Los Ántrax attempted to flee the scene in their vehicles; others tried to escape by running across the rooftops and yards of the neighborhood's houses. This caused panic among several neighbors when they overheard the gunshots. Velázquez and other gunmen decided to stay back and engage in a gunfight with the Army. The Army was able to neutralize the situation and kill three suspected leaders of Los Ántrax. Velázquez was killed by gunfire; his corpse was found covered in gunshot wounds inside a red armored Toyota Tacoma. He was quickly identified by security forces due to his particular physical characteristics: his beard and shaved head. The other two men killed were Jesús Rogelio Martínez Armenta (alias "El Chuy Piedra") and Gilberto Alejandro Simental Castañeda (alias "El Tilín").

Intelligence reports indicated that Los Ántrax was in Las Quintas to provide security to El Mayito Flaco, the last of El Mayo's children that remained a fugitive. (Note: Vicente Zambada Niebla (alias "El Vicentillo") was arrested on 19 March 2009; Serafín Zambada Ortiz (alias "El Sera") was arrested on 20 November 2013; and Ismael Zambada Imperial (alias "El Mayito Gordo") was arrested on 14 November 2014.) Authorities suspect that Velázquez and others decided to attack the Army to allow El Mayito Flaco to escape. However, Los Ántrax suffered three casualties, three injuries, and six arrests. The injured were José Carlos López Alanís (alias "El Cali"), Juan Carlos Aristegui Murillo (alias "El Toto"); and Jesús Javier Gómez Armenta. The Army's service team provided first aid to the wounded and filmed them in their efforts. Authorities also arrested Abelardo Salazar (alias "El 50" and/or "El 90"), Jesús Manuel Ibarra Chávez (alias "El Niñón"); and Carlos Meza González (alias "El Carlillos").

=== Investigation and aftermath ===
At the scene, the Army requested support from the Criminal Investigation Agency (AIC), a branch of the Attorney General's Office (PGR), to help gather evidences and carry out other legal procedures. They seized five assault rifles, one fragmentation grenade, and ten vehicles. Multiple bullet casing from AK-47s and other assault rifles were found at the scene. The home where the gathering took place was seized by the PGR. Investigators confirmed that they took Velázquez's corpse five hours after the shootout. The injured were taken to a public hospital in Culiacán; the Army sent 50 troops to the hospital and supervised people accessing the building to prevent Los Ántrax from attempting to rescue the survivors. The PGR stated that they would open an investigation against those involved in the shootout for violating Mexico's Federal Law of Firearms and Explosives.

Once authorities confirmed the details surrounding the shootout, they release information of Velázquez's role within Los Ántrax. They confirmed that he was the group's second-in-command and was the acting head of the assassin operations. He was said to have worked under El Cali, who headed the group after the arrest of El Chino Ántrax two years before. (Note: José Rodrigo Aréchiga Gamboa (alias "El Chino Ántrax") was arrested on 30 December 2014 at the Amsterdam Airport Schiphol in the Netherlands.) In addition, the Government of Sinaloa (es) told the press that they did not discard the possibility of a violent reaction from Los Ántrax against the government after Velázquez's death. State official Gerardo Vargas Landeros stated that municipal, state, and federal forces were working together to create a front against Los Ántrax. Investigators highlighted that operatives like the one that resulted in Velázquez's death were part of a larger military-led campaign headed by the federal government since 30 September 2016, when gunmen of the Sinaloa Cartel ambushed and killed five soldiers of the Army in Culiacán.

Neighbors described to the press that the scene was cordoned and under surveillance for at least twelve hours, and that the Army was questioning everyone who got close to the scene. They said the Army was the last law enforcement corporation to leave the neighborhood. When asked about the shootout, some omitted giving more information, but did state that the house where Velázquez was last in hosted parties often. They said they did not know who lived there. Other neighbors, who spoke on the condition of remaining anonymous, told the press that Velázquez and others were not armed and were likely extrajudicially killed, in an apparent tit-for-tat for previous attacks against the Army.

The press also received information from anonymous sources that the Army found out about Velázquez's location from an unknown tip, which they believed suggested he was likely betrayed by someone in the Sinaloa Cartel. That person who reportedly betrayed Velázquez and Los Ántrax was alleged to be Iván Archivaldo Guzmán Salazar, son of Joaquín "El Chapo" Guzmán, once Mexico's most-wanted man and former associate to Zambada. Guzmán Salazar and Velázquez's former boss El Chino Ántrax reportedly had a fall out at a bar in Sinaloa at least two years prior to Velázquez's death. The press also stated that Velázquez was not at the party when the shootout broke out in Las Quintas, and that he was in fact in Guadalupe neighborhood. Radio communication conversations pointed to the possibility that Los Ántrax requested him at the scene with reinforcements.

=== Funeral and burial ===
On 1 November 2016, authorities handed over Velázquez's corpse to his family. His relatives and friends held a wake for him at a home in El Salado, a town in Culiacán Municipality. At around 5:00 pm, his coffin was driven on a hearse through the town's streets. The press covered the funeral in detail, and highlighted the fact that Velázquez's ceremony was discreet and modest, unlike other organized crime members who host ostentatious funerals. His coffin was worth less than MXN$35,000 (close to US$1,700 in November 2016).

A crowd of friends and family members walked along the hearse and played tambora as they headed to El Salado's church, where a ceremony was held. His coffin was adorned with floral arrangements containing red roses. The flowers had several notes attached to them, including one from Velázquez's wife and daughters, and another from Rafael Guadalupe Félix Núñez (alias "El Changuito Ántrax"), a suspected member of Los Ántrax. Velázquez was then buried at a local cemetery that same day. Several residents from El Salado claimed to have met Velázquez, but omitted giving many details of his personal life. "We hardly saw him here. He rarely visited. But when he did, he was very kind", one of the residents said.

== See also ==
- Mexican drug war
