= Narcoculture =

Subculture stemming from drug cartels

Narcoculture is a subculture that has developed in response to the strong presence of drug cartels throughout countries such as Mexico. It is similar to other crime- and drug-related subcultures worldwide, such as the Scottish neds, European hooligans, American street-gang members, cholos, and outlaw bikers. Like them, narcoculture has evolved distinctive forms of dress, music, literature, film, religious beliefs and practices, and slang. These elements have contributed to its integration into mainstream culture in some regions, particularly among lower-income and less formally educated youth. Narcoculture is not uniform, but dynamic, with significant regional differences within Mexico and among those who engage with it.

== Origin ==
Narcoculture, like drug trafficking, had relatively modest beginnings in Mexico. Narcoculture is generally traced to drug-trafficking practices in the highlands of Badiraguato, Sinaloa. It was in the Sierra Madre Occidental, or rural highlands, that a distinct drug-trafficking identity emerged, before being consolidated as it expanded into urban areas. Narcoculture has been described as a code of conduct and a lifestyle associated with participation in the "narco world."

Several scholars, including Luis Alejandro Astorga Almanza and Jorge Alan Sánchez Godoy, argue that there is no evidence that cannabis or opium was consumed in Mexico prior to the arrival of Spanish and Chinese immigrants. Although indigenous communities in Mexico used hallucinogenic mushrooms and peyote for religious purposes, cannabis was introduced following Spanish colonisation. Astorga argues that drug trafficking in Mexico originated in connection with Chinese immigration to Sinaloa, where Chinese immigrants are said to have brought poppy seeds when they arrived to work on railroads and in mines.

Sánchez Godoy further argues that after cannabis was introduced to Mexico, it was initially used for medicinal purposes, while poppy plants were used ornamentally and served as inspiration for several Mexican corridos, or ballads.

== Narco production in Mexico ==
The US effectively banned all psychoactive drugs when the federal government passed the Harrison Act in 1914, prohibiting all non-medicinal use of opium, morphine, and cocaine. In 1919, the National Prohibition Act made alcoholic beverages illegal (though this was later voided by the Twenty-first Amendment, ratified in 1933), and the Marijuana Tax Act of 1937 outlawed marijuana.

Mexico's proximity to the US made it an easy black-market source of these drugs, and American bootleggers and traffickers rushed to obtain illicit narcotics and alcohol. Exports of illicit Mexican opium, heroin, and marijuana for US consumption steadily increased as a result of Prohibition.

The black market grew quickly, with millions of Americans creating a sudden demand for a huge supply of alcohol, heroin, marijuana and cocaine. The initial shortage caused a boost in drug prices, and these new "super-profits" attracted black-market suppliers to fill the vacuum.

=== Expulsion of Chinese producers ===
During the early 1920s, the Chinese in Sinaloa were victims of segregation, hate crimes, and forceful deportation. In 1927, to cooperate with its northern neighbour, Mexican President Plutarco Elias Calles, by federal mandate, ordered the expulsion of the Chinese poppy producers.

=== US morphine demand ===
Once Chinese poppy producers were expelled from Sinaloa, the production of narcotics became controlled by rural Mexican farmers. The narcotics production in Mexico was still small, but the demand for morphine in the United States, created by the disruption in its morphine supply from Europe during the World Wars, led to the temporary legalization of narcotics in Mexico.

=== Mexican production and the birth of narcoculture ===
Scholars like Jorge Alan Sánchez Godoy and Luis Alejandro Astorga Almanza argue that narcotics were temporarily legalized in Sinaloa in order to supply the United States' demand during the World Wars. The period when the production of narcotics was temporarily legalized ultimately shaped and created the drug trafficking identity in the region. This is when narcoculture first began to appear. It is also the period when Mexico began large-scale production of narcotics.

== Rise of Mexican drug cartels and consolidation of narcoculture ==
The 1950s in Mexico were marked by the term narcotráfico ("drug traffic"), which began to appear throughout the media. During the 1940s through the 1970s, drug trafficking in Mexico was considered to be a small family business with a relatively simple organization and division of labor. It was not until after the 1970s, with the growth of demand from the United States and alliances with Colombian drug traffickers, that cartels in Mexico were formed to control the production and distribution of narcotics. At this point, Mexico became both a major producer and distributor of illicit drugs, especially narcotics. Alliances between Mexican and Colombian drug cartels allowed Mexico to serve as a route of entrance for cocaine arriving in the United States from Colombia, becoming a major distributor. Mexico had been a major producer since Prohibition in the United States, when Mexico supplied the United States with heroin, morphine, opium, alcohol, and cannabis. As drug trafficking expanded in Mexico, so did narcoculture. Narcoculture expanded into the urban sector of society and began the process of legitimization, moving away from a subculture into a part of the dominant culture.

=== Coining the term narcoculture ===
The term "narcoculture" was first coined in the 1970s. Narcoculture describes the way of life and ideas of drug traffickers. Its existence depends on drug traffickers and drug trafficking, maintaining a transnational network of production, transportation, and commercialization of illegal drugs.

Drug trafficking has political, economic, ideological, and cultural implications. Drug traffickers interact with the rest of society, and as this daily interaction progresses, some of the drug traffickers' mannerisms are adopted by society, leading to cultural change and legitimization. Some aspects are adopted by those outside drug trafficking, and over time, people forget that what they have adopted is narcoculture.

=== Rise of the Mexican Mafiosos ===
Narcoculture in Sinaloa shares many characteristics with Mediterranean culture and mafias in that both are based on honor, bravery, family loyalty, protection, vengeance, generosity, hospitality, nobility, and prestige. Drug traffickers use claves ("codes") to maintain a level of secrecy. Some of these codes, however, have been revealed in narcocorridos (Mexican ballads about drug trafficking) and are then used by people who listen to this music, even if they are not drug traffickers. This is an example of when narcoculture becomes a part of mainstream discourse.

Prior to the 1970s, narcoculture and drug trafficking in Sinaloa were almost exclusively rural. The stigma that was placed on narcotics early on meant that people in the cities were reluctant to accept it as a legitimate activity. But in the countryside of Sinaloa, people were starving, and drug trafficking often seemed like the only viable solution. The rural population was a marginalized part of society with little access to education or other means of upward social mobility, and was often ignored by the government and society. Drug trafficking for them became a source of income and an outlet to rebel against the government that had forgotten them in the countryside.

=== Mafioso Poseurs and modern narcoculture ===
Narcoculture is a type of crime-related subculture that emerges in places where traffickers or other mafias have great power and, in consequence, great cultural influence. Because of that influence, their lives and exploits are often glamourised by the mass media, and they are looked up to as role models by some young people.

Subcultures similar to Mexican narco culture emerged in the United States during Prohibition, and in Colombia and Italy in the 1990s. These subcultures were characterized by extravagance, ostentation, hedonism, rural roots, honor, prestige, consumerism, power, utilitarianism, religiosity, and violence.

Those who take part in narcoculture are not necessarily drug traffickers or part of a criminal organization. Indeed, many of the participants in narcoculture are young people who come from marginalized sectors of society. The admiration that youth have for narcos is similar to the way other kids might look up to rock stars or sports legends. In some cases, the admiration that they feel for drug traffickers, whom they see as heroes, does lead them to get involved in drug trafficking. But in most cases, they merely consume narco culture and imagine that they are part of the narco world, becoming "narco-poseurs".

Narcoculture has created a fantasy where some people believe that drug trafficking is the only way to escape poverty. This fantasy is supported primarily through music (narcocorridos) and visual media, including television and film. Some believe that narcoculture originated in the highlands of Sinaloa, where many of the famous drug lords were born, such as Joaquín "El Chapo" Guzmán, Ismael "El Mayo" Zambada, Miguel Ángel Félix Gallardo (aka "El Jefe de Jefes"), the Beltrán-Leyva brothers, Ernesto Fonseca Carrillo (aka "Don Neto"), Rafael Caro Quintero, Juan José Esparragoza Moreno (aka "El Azul"), Pedro Avilés Pérez (aka "El León de la Sierra"), and many more. Narcoculture is rooted in the rural areas of Mexico's Pacific Northwest and, although it is constantly changing, it continues to foster and strengthen its rural roots over time.

=== Narcoculture lifestyle ===
Narcoculture glorifies the usually male individual and his achievements, wealth, and masculinity. Narcos often live luxurious lifestyles and display their wealth by wearing expensive clothing. There are regional differences in the styles of dress; for example, the northern cities closer to the border are influenced by American styles of dress and brands. Narco fashion is gender-conscious, where men and women wear distinct fashion items pertaining to their gender. In many Mexican cities, men may wear piteado belts, cowboy boots made of exotic animal skins, silk shirts, and cowboy hats or baseball caps. Some narcos have cast aside the "cowboy" or northern style in favour of expensive designer clothes.

Certain clothing brands, such as Ralph Lauren polo shirts or Ed Hardy style clothing, were worn by several infamous drug traffickers at the moment of their capture, becoming highly fashionable items among the masses and prompting the creation of imitation styles sold on the black market.

Styles vary in many cities, but it is very common to see drug traffickers wearing luxury brand labels such as Balenciaga, Burberry, Dolce & Gabbana, Gucci, Hugo Boss, and Louis Vuitton hats, shirts, belts and shoes. Women associated with drug cartels often dress very ostentatiously and wear much jewelry, and it is common to see them wear brands such as Bebe, Burberry, Chanel, Coach, Dior, Gucci, and Guess.

Besides wearing expensive brands, drug lords often run their own bars, which are visited mostly by men. Here, narco parties take place, get-togethers and parties where narcos drink and socialize. Although many businesses have closed down because of the tremendous amount of violence sweeping the nation, the narcobars, restaurants, and nightclubs have remained open and thrived.

The projection of a glamorous image of the drug cartels by the mass media in Mexico has served to thwart the federal government's efforts to legitimize the war against drugs and organized crime.

=== Narco music ===
==== Narco corridos ====
In Sinaloa, narcoculture enjoys a place of privilege, but in other parts of Mexico, the acceptance of narcoculture has been a slow process. Narco corridos, however, have helped narcoculture become more acceptable in places where interactions with drug traffickers do not take place on a daily basis.

The Mexican corrido, a song narrating stories, real or imagined, about historical characters, became popular during the Mexican Revolution of 1910. The corrido became popular because it narrated news and events to a largely illiterate population. The corrido also created popular heroes and celebrated their lives and adventures. Pancho Villa, revolutionary leader, was one of the figures celebrated through these corridos.

Although these corridos mention kidnappings, assassinations, executions, battles, and disasters, they differ from narco-corridos in that the original corridos attempted to tell a story and give a moral message (like the fall and redemption, sin and punishment, or life and death of a person).

The first narco-corridos began to appear in the 1970s. Most scholars agree that Los Tigres del Norte were the pioneers of this genre, first appearing in the southwestern United States, then becoming popular in Sinaloa, Sonora, Baja California and Michoacán.

Narcocorridos glorify and romanticize narco trafficking, and in a more recent trend of hyper-violent lyrics (called movimiento alterado, Spanish for "cocaine-alertness movement"), they may express a pride of modern narcos in murdering, torturing, and dismembering their rivals. By contrast, traditional corridos often told of a "benevolent bandit" who committed crimes for a good cause, similar to a Robin Hood figure. Through narcocorridos, drug lords like Joaquín "El Chapo" Guzmán, Ismael "El Mayo" Zambada, and Rafael Caro Quintero, among others, have been elevated to popular heroes in a similar way as the traditional corrido elevated benevolent bandits like Heraclio Bernal and Jesús Malverde during the Mexican Revolution. The corridos about these characters praised the bravery of these bandits and identified them as defenders of the poor against an unjust government.

In addition to narrating the stories of well-known drug lords, narcocorridos demonstrate the evolution of drug trafficking in Mexico. The narcocorridos often display a yearning for the countryside while expressing a desire for the modernity that the city has to offer. The austerity and simplicity of the countryside are reflected through images of horses, the ranch, agriculture, poverty, and the sombrero. The modernity of the city and material desires are expressed through images of mansions, luxury cars, cell phones, and designer clothing. Despite the poverty that exists in rural areas, narco corridos idealize it as a place where there is no judgment or obstacle that would impede drug trafficking.

==== Narco Hip-Hop ====
A music scene, similar to the early underground gangsta rap of the United States in the mid- to late-1990s, has emerged in northeastern Mexico (Nuevo León, Tamaulipas, and Coahuila), where the music of hip-hop is being co-opted by the influence of organized crime and the drug war in the region. This has been termed Mexican narco-rap, and it often has lyrics similar to those of a narcocorrido (drug ballad).

However, unlike the narcocorridos, which relate to rural regions of the Pacific Northwest of Mexico and are generally linked to the Sinaloa cartel, narco-rap emerged in the urban area of Tamaulipas, along the border with Texas, a turf currently under armed dispute between the Zetas and the Gulf Cartel.

Derived from the constant presence of halcones ("hawks", or cartel spies) and cartel convoys circulating the streets of the region, young people have been directly involved in the local narcoculture, and narco-rap expresses the reality of life on the streets of those cities under the drug cartels' rule.

There are several notable songs, among them a highly popular song called "The Song of Metro 3" that praises the life and exploits of drug lord Samuel Flores Borrego (alias "Metro 3") for his "ferocity and loyalty." Other narco-rap songs celebrate "Metro 3", such as Tamaulipas-based duo Cano y Blunt's "Comandante Metro 3".

Some of the main exponents of the genre are Cartel de Santa, Cano y Blunt, DemenT, and Big Los.

Mexican narco-related hip-hop and narcoculture have also bled into United States hip-hop, where artists such as Uncle Murda, Skrillex, YG, Gucci Mane, 2 Chainz, and Jayceon "The Game" Taylor have all made songs dedicated drug to traffickers like "El Chapo" Guzmán.

=== Narco juniors ===
"Narco juniors" represent a new wave of narcoculture. Narco juniors are the children of first-generation drug lords, or the children of rich entrepreneurs who got involved in the drug trade "for fun", who have come to reconstitute the meaning of narcoculture and drug trafficking in Mexico. Unlike their fathers or grandfathers, narco juniors have for the most part been raised in urban wealth. By contrast, the older narcos were mostly raised in rural poverty and as a result, placed a high value on family and felt connected to their rural roots, people, and culture. They felt a responsibility to give back to their community. However, narco juniors share a cynical pride in being drug traffickers and tend to place more value on spending money, parties, and luxury. Many of the marginalized people who were helped by the older traffickers have now become the victims of the narco juniors' aggression.

=== Narco religion ===
Narco superstition and religion are a major aspect of narcoculture. It is a form of superstition and religiosity depicted through drug traffickers' devotion to Jesús Malverde. Malverde was celebrated in old corridos, said to be a bandit who stole from the rich to give to the poor and lived his life running from the authorities. His image was appropriated as the patron saint of drug traffickers, the poor, and the marginalized. An altar with his name was erected in the place where it is said that he was hanged by the government.

Another aspect of narco religion is the involvement of drug traffickers with their local churches. This occurs primarily through narco limosnas ("drug donations") that drug traffickers give to the church. Drug traffickers have also used churches to launder money. Some drug traffickers and their hitmen pray for protection to Santa Muerte, a personification of death in folk Catholicism.

=== Narco propaganda ===
Narco propaganda includes narco mantas, banners that appear in public places, such as highway overpasses and bridges. This is a way for narcos to communicate directly with the populace. These banners are also used to threaten leaders or other members of rival cartels. Variations of these banners include the narco poster, a message left next to a dead body, and the narco pinta, graffiti sprayed or hand-painted on a whitewashed brick or adobe wall next to a commercial building or house.

=== Narco western ===
Modern literature, not only novels and poetry, but also newspapers, magazines, and internet publications, narrate "real stories", or at least what is believed to be real, about certain people involved with the narco movement. Sometimes they exaggerate the legacy of these people and the crimes they have committed in order to intimidate their enemies or the population in general.

The narco western is a new literary genre that was started by Hilario Peña's Chinola Kid, published in October 2012. In a recent interview, Hilario stated that the narco western is the modern version of a western. Instead of a horse, his character drives a truck, and instead of fighting Apaches, his character must defeat criminals and the federal police in the state of Sinaloa.

=== Narco cinema ===
Narco cinema in Mexico started as a combination of telenovelas (soap operas) and Mexican cinema during the 1960s, when the "golden age" of cinema collapsed due to interest in television. During the 1970s, narco cinema consisted of "Mexploitation" movies released mostly for home entertainment or "video home", creating a B-film market that focused on very controversial topics, which, with the use of violence, would try to create a national reality or identity. These films were mostly made with a low budget, usually under 140,000 Mexican pesos (US$10,000), telling stories about police, drug dealers, and prostitutes. They were rarely discussed by mainstream critics because of their low budgets and connection with pop culture and low-brow entertainment.

Narco cinema today controls the Mexican film market, being influential along the border between the United States and Mexico. The films deal with the identity of the narco, usually focusing on the struggle of an anti-hero immersed in a border culture and articulating narratives of life, death, love, loss, hope, greed, desire, humor, and violence, alongside addiction, repetition, and compulsion.

Narco cinema develops anti-norms and expresses feelings discouraged in culturally accepted institutions. In this genre, violence is at its most extreme, with weapons and thug-like behavior taking center stage. The use of stereotyped characters and predictable plots alienates those looking for subtexts, complex story lines, and sophisticated writing, but for poor rural communities, these films are in demand because they tell the story of their lives and the lives around them.

Narco violence is also used in mainstream American and Mexican films, taking inspiration from real-life events that marked the country, or in other cases, fictionalized events. A major example of narco violence in American media was the TV show Breaking Bad. Other examples of mainstream narco cinema include Miss Bala, El Infierno and Heli. Miss Bala is a 2011 film directed by Gerardo Naranjo that premiered at the Cannes Film Festival and received attention from critics, becoming a box office success in Mexico. Based on real-life events, it tells the story of a young woman dreaming of becoming a beauty pageant queen. Narcos manipulate her to work for them, in exchange for her victory. El Infierno is a film directed by Luis Estrada. Compared to Miss Bala, this film is more fictionalized and makes more use of dark humor, developing empathy for an anti-hero and glorifying drug bosses. Heli, by Mexican director Amat Escalante, is one of the most representative films of narco cinema. The director said he tried not to focus the movie around explicit violence, which is expected of drug-related movies. Yet one scene from the movie was considered one of the most brutal in Mexican cinema, showing traffickers burning the genitals of two young men in front of a group of children. Escalante refers to this as exposition, in that it shows how Mexico's youth is being ruined by these kinds of people, at times leaving them without anything to look forward to in the future. The film focuses on love, family, hope, and people wanting to believe they can succeed. This hope is conveyed through the eyes of Estela, a girl who falls in love with an older boy who involves her and her family in the drug world. Heli tries to eliminate the stereotypical figure of the Mexican cowboy or ranchero, where the male figure is depicted wearing cowboy boots and a hat. Instead, the film shows atrocities committed by traffickers, but without offering any real solutions.

=== Social media ===
Cartels have been making use of the Internet over the years, progressing from the outdated MySpace to Facebook, Twitter and Instagram. On these sites, they often post videos that announce themselves as a new emerging power to be feared. One of the most visited websites to follow information about events related to narco violence is El Blog del Narco, which defines itself as neutral. Their only objective is to publish stories in a journalistic way. What draws the most attention are the confessional/torture videos posted by cartels, which contain copious graphic violence, often depicting torture of cartel prisoners and even executions in front of the camera. Twitter is often used to post threats, and sometimes, with the use of special technology, narcos can track other rivals in order to kill them. This can be detrimental to them as well, because sometimes police find them in the same way. Instagram can be used to show off narco lifestyles, which include new cars, expensive watches, designer clothes, fine liquor, exotic pets, and massive weaponry.

Notable examples of social media-oriented drug traffickers are El Chino Ántrax and Claudia Ochoa Felix, supposed leaders of Los Ántrax, an enforcer gang of the Sinaloa cartel. Both captured the attention of news outlets and blogs with photos on Twitter and Instagram that showed how they enjoy the sort of spoils that Mexicans relate with the lives of successful drug traffickers. Claudia posts pictures on social media in which she poses with expensive accessories like watches, purses, designer clothes, champagne bottles, cars, planes, and big guns. In a press release, she mentioned how her life had changed after those pictures circulated around the world, and how she feared for her family's safety. She claims that all the pictures of her were modified, because she is not the one appearing in them. She also claims that she has no association whatsoever with any of the drug cartels operating in Mexico.

== See also ==
- Mexican drug war
- Crime in Mexico
