= José Rodrigo Aréchiga Gamboa =

Mexican drug trafficker (1980–2020)

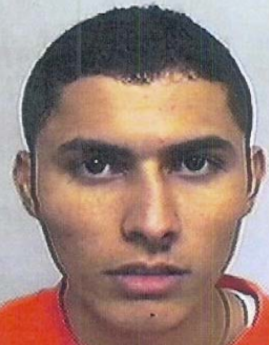
- Born: José Rodrigo Aréchiga Gamboa; 15 June 1980; Culiacán, Sinaloa, Mexico
- Died: 15 May 2020 (aged 39); Culiacán, Sinaloa, Mexico
- Other names: R-57; El Oriental; Scarface Renacido; El Comandante Ántrax; Norberto Sicairos García; El Chino Antrax
- Occupations: Sinaloa Cartel drug lord, Los Ántrax leader and founder
- Partner: Yuriana Castillo Torres (1988–2014; her death)

José Rodrigo Aréchiga Gamboa (15 June 1980 – 15 May 2020), commonly referred to by his alias "El Chino Ántrax", was a Mexican drug lord, a professional hitman, and a high-ranking member of the Sinaloa Cartel, a criminal organization based in Sinaloa.

He was one of the leaders and the founder of Los Ántrax, an armed enforcement group that protected Sinaloa cartel leader Ismael "El Mayo" Zambada and his sons. He was arrested on 30 December 2013 at Amsterdam Airport Schiphol in the Netherlands at the request of the United States, which contacted Interpol to arrest him for charges relating to drug trafficking. He was extradited in 2014. After being sentenced to house arrest, he was reported missing on 9 May 2020. He reappeared in Culiacán, Sinaloa, on 15 May 2020 where he was found murdered along with his sister and brother-in-law.

== Early life ==
José Rodrigo Aréchiga Gamboa, often referred to by his alias 'El Chino Ántrax', was born in Culiacán, Sinaloa, Mexico on 15 June 1980. But raised in Sinaloa Aréchiga Gamboa began to work for the Sinaloa Cartel as a bodyguard of Vicente Zambada Niebla (alias "El Vicentillo"), son of Ismael "El Mayo" Zambada, until 2008. Following the separation of the Sinaloa organization and the Beltrán Leyva Cartel that year, he went on to form Los Ántrax, an armed squadron of the Sinaloa Cartel for providing armed security services to "El Mayo" Zambada.

He was nearly killed on 4 November 2008 when an armed commando opened fire at a car wash in Culiacán. In the attack, Los Ántrax lost one of its members, Alfredo Vizcarra Vega (alias "El Fello Ántrax"), son of a Sinaloa police commander. Aréchiga Gamboa reportedly managed to escape uninjured during the shootout. Following the arrest of Zambada Niebla in March 2009, the drug lord ascended in the apex of the Sinaloa Cartel given his friendship with one of "El Mayo" Zambada's sons. He was then called to oversee the plaza (turf) of Culiacán, the center of operations of Los Ántrax and the city where the Zambada family reportedly resided.

== Tenure in Los Ántrax ==
In 2008, he founded Los Ántrax with another drug lord known as René Velázquez Valenzuela (alias Sergeant "Phoenix Ántrax", Vladi Portillo [the Russian] "El Gato Negro" (Black cat) and "El Taliban"), who was arrested by the Mexican Army that year and sent to jail in Aguaruto, Sinaloa. Among the first gang leaders to die was Redel Castro (alias "El Pocho Ántrax"), who was killed in a massive shootout in June 2010 with rival members of the Beltrán Leyva Cartel in Tubutama, Sonora. In May 2011, the Mexican Army arrested, tortured, and killed three members of Los Ántrax after they mistook them for kidnappers: the members were Franklin Olguín Velázquez (alias "El Franki" and/or "El Dos"), Jesús Humberto Corona Guillén (alias "El Chuve"), and Pedro Valenzuela Meza (alias "El Pedrón"). In November of that year, Francisco Arce Rubio (alias "Pancho Arce"), another high-ranking gang leader close to El Chino Ántrax, was killed during an indoor soccer game in Culiacán by rival gangsters of Los Mazatlecos. Following the death of Arce Rubio, "El Mayo" Zambada withdrew El Chino Ántrax from the day-to-day activities of Los Ántrax until he sorted things out. However, the attacks against the gang continued; in February 2012, Roque Landeros (alias "Roque Ántrax") was killed with three other men in Culiacán. Local media outlets alleged that the killings stemmed from an internal power struggle within the Sinaloa Cartel, specifically from a group commanded by "El Chapo" Guzmán. Mexico's Office of the General Prosecutor (PGR) and Secretariat of Public Security (SSP) have identified various other leaders under the hierarchy of El Chino Ántrax. Jesús Peña (alias "El 20") is believed to be a close associate of the drug lord; others include a man known as Melesio (alias "El Mele"); "El Traka Ántrax", identified by authorities as the gang's recruiter; Eusebio Imperial or Eliseo Castro (alias "El Cheyo Ántrax"), a supposed nephew of "El Mayo" Zambada; a man known as "El Monkey"; and "El Changuito", the former alleged financial head of Los Ántrax, both arrested on 16 April 2012.

Aréchiga Gamboa was wanted by the United States government and faced charges in a San Diego, California federal court for trafficking methamphetamines, cocaine and marijuana. The charge alleged that he conspired with other people to import 500 grams of methamphetamines and 5 kilograms of cocaine to the U.S. The indictment, started by the Drug Enforcement Administration (DEA) in late 2011, was part of an investigation known as Operation Narco Polo, where federal agents intercepted several phone calls from March and October 2012 between Aréchiga Gamboa and drug traffickers from the San Diego–Tijuana area. The investigation also included the testimony of arrested smugglers, seized drugs and money, and photographs that inculpate them.

From 2011 and 2013, the drug lord lived in Los Cabos, Baja California Sur and led Los Ántrax against the criminal group Los Zetas in the area. While in Los Cabos, Aréchiga Gamboa reportedly ordered the murder of Francisco Rafael Arellano Félix, a former leader of the Tijuana Cartel, on 18 October 2013. The PGR revealed that the motive possibly stemmed from Arellano Félix's involvement in money laundering activities and as a message from the Los Ántrax to show that they were in charge of organized crime in Los Cabos. The Baja California state authorities identified the possible murders of the drug lord: Noé Castro (alias "R1"), Aréchiga Gamboa's right-hand man in Los Cabos; and a man known by his alias "R13".

== Social media activities ==
His most common alias was Chino Anthrax, but the drug lord was also known as El Comandante Ántrax ("Commander Anthrax"), R-57, El Oriental ("The Oriental"), El Quinto Elemento ("The Fifth Element"), Scarface Renacido ("Reborn Scarface"), among others. On his Facebook, Twitter (@comandante57_) and Instagram (miauuuu5_7 and jamesbond5_7) accounts, Aréchiga Gamboa uploaded pictures and videos of his ostentatious lifestyle, which included trips to Europe, Las Vegas (where he attended the Manny Pacquiao vs. Brandon Rios fight), Japan, and parts of Africa and the Middle East. In one of his pictures, the drug lord appears alongside Paris Hilton. The drug lord also has pictures with Ismael Zambada Imperial (alias "El Mayito Gordo"), son of "El Mayo" Zambada and a high-ranking enforcer within the cartel. He also has pictures with Serafín Zambada Ortiz (alias "El Sera"), also son of "El Mayo" Zambada who was arrested by U.S. authorities in November 2013 while attempting to cross the U.S.-Mexico border in Arizona.

He also uploaded pictures of his sport cars, yachts, weapons, jewelry, money, and extravagant parties with famous narcocorrido bands. On social media, he raffled cellphones, sunglasses, cars, and other gifts with his followers. He frequently appeared on his Instagram feed sporting his muscular physique, protein intakes, and workout routines. Aréchiga Gamboa also has several narcocorrido ballads about him, some which describe him as an "elegant and fit man" who enjoys his sport cars, yachts, and drinking champagne. He was part of the younger generation of Mexican drug traffickers that enjoy displaying their luxurious lifestyle online. Although he always blurred his face in his social media pictures, in most of them he was shown wearing the skull shaped diamond ring, in reference to Los Ántrax, as a form of signature. Despite attempting to be discreet by blurring his face, U.S. authorities were able to track him down thanks to his photos. They learned that Aréchiga Gamboa liked to travel across the world; his ring also helped them identify him when he landed in the Netherlands from Mexico on 31 December 2013 and was arrested.

== Arrest ==
On 3 January 2014, the Netherlands Ministry of Security and Justice and the Mexican Embassy in the country confirmed that a 33-year-old Mexican citizen had been arrested by the Dutch police as he arrived from Latin America to Amsterdam Airport Schiphol in the Netherlands using a false name on 30 December 2013. (Note: Other sources state that the drug lord was arrested on 31 December 2013. However, the United States Department of the Treasury confirmed it was on 30 December 2013. In addition, there are conflicting accounts on where he had arrived from; some sources say he arrived from Mexico City, while others from South America. Another source incorrectly states he was arrested while aboarding a flight to Mexico.) Initially, the authorities did not give any details on the identity of the detainee, but an anonymous U.S. federal agent and Mexican local newspapers leaked information to the media that the man was in fact Aréchiga Gamboa. The arrest of the drug lord was officially confirmed later that day by the U.S. government. According to officials, Aréchiga Gamboa travelled with the fake name of Norberto Sicairos García; at the time of his arrest, he was carrying an iPhone 5, a Blackberry Bold, three airplane tickets, credit cards from Visa and MasterCard from Banamex, and a Mexican driver's license. Upon his arrest, he was sent to the Vught maximum-security prison. U.S. law enforcement managed to identify Aréchiga Gamboa through unspecified forensic methods despite the fact that the drug lord had used a fake name to travel, undergone plastic surgery to change his appearance, and altered his fingerprints.

On 2 January 2014, he appeared before a judge, who spoke about his situation and the motives behind his arrest. The Dutch authorities confirmed that the drug lord had been arrested at the request of the U.S. government, which had contacted Interpol to assist them in the arrest of the drug lord for charges relating to drug trafficking. They did not contact Mexican officials. The following day, the U.S. District Court for the Southern District of California solicited an extradition request to bring the drug lord to trial in the U.S.

=== Kingpin Act sanction ===
On 8 January 2014, the U.S. Department of the Treasury sanctioned the drug lord under the Foreign Narcotics Kingpin Designation Act (Kingpin Act), which froze assets he may have had in the U.S. and virtually prohibited U.S. citizens from carrying out financial or commercial deals with him. The document alleged that, besides working for the drug lord "El Mayo" Zambada, Aréchiga Gamboa coordinated logistics and drug transportations for "El Chapo" Guzmán and worked alongside Gonzalo Inzunza Inzunza (alias "El Macho Prieto"), another Sinaloa Cartel high-ranking enforcer who was killed in Sonora in December 2013. The drug lords he worked for had already been sanctioned by the U.S. government under the Kingpin Act in 2001, 2002, 2009, and 2011.

== Extradition and trial ==
On 14 May 2014, an official spokesperson of a court in Harlem stated to the press that the request of the U.S. to extradite Aréchiga Gamboa was planned to be defined by 29 May 2014. On 28 May 2014, a Dutch court approved the extradition to the U.S. The defense of El Chino Ántrax, who was not present during the hearing, was allowed by law to appeal the decision, a process that could have taken months. On 10 July 2014, he was extradited from Amsterdam to the U.S., where he arrived at San Diego International Airport at around 2:00 p.m. under tight security by the DEA and the U.S. Marshal Service. Upon his arrival, he was taken into custody and booked for his drug-related charges. He was expected to be arraigned on such charges the next day.

The following day, he pleaded not guilty to the drug charges against him and was held without bail after the U.S. Magistrate Mitchell D. Dembin deemed him a public threat and capable of fleeing to Mexico if released. Those present in the courtroom had to pass a secondary metal detector and pat-down before entering the hearing site. According to one of the case's attorneys, a group of women who were supposedly family members of Aréchiga Gamboa sat in one of the middle rows of the courtroom. They declined to comment about the case, just like Aréchiga Gamboa's defense Frank Ragen. After his court appearance, Aréchiga Gamboa was imprisoned at the Metropolitan Correctional Center, San Diego and was scheduled to appear in court again for a motion hearing conducted by federal judge Dana Makoto Sabraw on 22 August 2014.

On the morning of 21 August 2014, he reappeared in court for a twenty-minute hearing. The U.S. District Court for the Southern District of California declared it a "complex case" after the defense asked for a time extension given the overwhelming amount of evidences presented by the prosecution. According to the court archives, the DEA has under its possession documents that prove that Aréchiga Gamboa participated in at least fifty drug trafficking shipments between Mexico and the United States. His next court appearance was scheduled for 21 November 2014. On that date, however, the hearing was postponed to 6 March 2015 after his attorney asked in court for more time to evaluate the evidence against his client. Unlike in other court sessions, Aréchiga Gamboa's family members were not present in the courtroom.

He pleaded guilty on 20 March 2015 and admitted that he had participated in cocaine and marijuana shipments from Mexico to the U.S., and that he had facilitated violent activities for the Sinaloa Cartel.

After being in custody in the United States for six years, Archeiga was sentenced to seven years and three months in a US federal prison.

On 3 March 2020, he was released and placed into house arrest. On 9 May, his probation officer reported him as missing.

== Death ==
On the night of 14 May 2020, Aréchiga Gamboa, his sister, and her husband were in the house when they were visited by a Sinaloa Cartel ‘hit squad’, which resulted in a fierce firefight with Chino firing back with an automatic assault rifle. This fire lasted until dawn and when they ran out of ammo, then surrendered and were taken hostage by armed men. The next day police in the town of Ayune, Sinaloa, discovered a black SUV with three dead bodies inside - one of the bodies was later identified as José Rodrigo Aréchiga Gamboa. He was shot dead and wrapped in cloth, his head was covered with a black plastic bag. The other two bodies were identified as his sister and her husband. It was later reported that his murder was likely ordered by senior leaders of the Sinaloa Cartel.

== Family ==
His romantic partner Yuriana Castillo Torres was reportedly kidnapped by armed men while heading to her vehicle after leaving a gym in Culiacán, Sinaloa on 6 May 2014. Her corpse was discovered on 06:45 the next day by Mexican law enforcement at a vacant lot in Lomas de Guadalupe neighborhood in Culiacán, and confirmed to be hers by her family members at the forensic installations. Post-mortem reports showed that Castillo Torres had been tortured, received several blows to the head, and that her hands and legs were tied with an electric cable. At the funeral home where the wake took place, members of Los Ántrax reportedly paid their condolences by leaving a floral ornament in honor of her.

== In popular culture ==
There are several narcocorridos (drug ballads) that narrate some of the exploits of Aréchiga Gamboa and his assassin squad Los Ántrax. Most of the songs belong to the trend of narcocorridos known as movimiento alterado ("the altered movement"), which promotes violence in reference to the physiological effect of cocaine consumption.

== See also ==
- Mexican drug war
