= Cabrito western =

Film genre

The cabrito western is a Mexican film genre that emerged during the 1980s in Monterrey, Nuevo León. Its plots were based on Mexican migrants to the United States, drug trafficking, and crime in Mexico. Some of its films used elements of the American western, adapted to contemporary reality. 3444

== Origins ==
As a result of a new wave of Mexican migration to the US (a consequence of the devaluation of the peso and the economic crisis Mexico was experiencing in the early 1980s), some film producers, such as Roberto González Benavides and Mario Almada, noticed a new audience willing to see stories that reflected their experiences. The combination of high production costs, the discovery of this "new market," the geographical location, and the technical training of its filmmakers led to the emergence of the "cabrito western." The creation of this subgenre established a cinema without ambition in terms of quality that met the formal requirements of the western; despite its low quality and precarious production, distribution, and exhibition conditions, it managed to fill the movie theaters where it was shown.

== Influence ==
Films such as Pistoleros famosos (1980), Lola la trailera (1983), and El traficante (1983), focused on the stories of the populations that inhabit northern Mexico and the southern United States. Their success demonstrated that there was an audience eager to see stories set on the northern Mexican border, which influenced films about the border decades later, such as Picking Up the Pieces (2000), Crash (2004), or Babel (2006).

== See also ==
- Mexploitation
