= El Taliban =

El Taliban or El Talibán may refer to:

- Iván Velázquez Caballero (born 1970), Mexican suspected drug lord
- René Velázquez Valenzuela (died 2016), Mexican suspected assassin
