= Metropolitan Correctional Center =

Metropolitan Correctional Center is the name of several federal prisons in the United States:

- Metropolitan Correctional Center, Chicago
- Metropolitan Correctional Center, New York
- Metropolitan Correctional Center, San Diego
