= Narco pelicula =

Mexican action film sub-genre

Narco pelicula, also known as narco film or narco filme, is a sub-genre of Mexican cinema's action film and Mexploitation genres. It deals with movies about drug trafficking and drug cartels, usually but not exclusively fictitious ones.

Although generally considered part of Mexican cinema, some narco peliculas are actually filmed in the United States, and could actually therefore be considered American films and part of American cinema as well.

== History ==
Production of narco peliculas started to peak during the late 1970s, when such films like La Banda del Carro Rojo (The Red Car Gang) were released. This film starred brothers Fernando and Mario Almada and Pedro Infante, Jr. It spanned two sequels.

With the advent of VCR technology, around 1982, en masse production of narco peliculas began. VCR technology allowed producers to recoup production money by filming low budget action films and not having to compete with Hollywood films for the Mexican moviegoers' money or sharing a portion of the movie's earnings with cinema chains by releasing these films straight to VCR. The sub-genre then became popular with Mexican audiences in the United States but films were released elsewhere as well, like in Puerto Rico, for example.

In 1983, the narco pelicula, Lola the Truck Driver earned $1,000,000 US dollars in Mexico and $2,500,000 in the United States, being filmed with a $150,000 budget, making this movie one of the first of the sub-genre to become a monetary success for film producers.

As of 2020, in the United States, narco peliculas were available on such television channels as Cine Mexicano, which was showing such contemporary narco films as La Venganza del Muerto, El Sanguinario de la Sierra, La Reina del Narco 2, El Vengador de un Gallero and Maldito Dinero.

== Plots ==
Usually, narco films are about drug cartels fighting each other for territory, and-or police organizations that want to break them. Usually, the plot leads to an end-scene gang battle in which guns and sometimes knives and bombs are employed.

Some narco peliculas also interlude scenes with musical videos of corridos by popular nortena music bands, either regular corridos or narco-corridos.

== Notable narco pelicula actors ==
- Fernando Almada
- Mario Almada - by his own estimate, he participated in about 1,000 of these films
- Rosa Gloria Chagoyán - Lola la Trailera
- Sergio Goyri
- Amador Granados - El Alacran
- Max Hernandez
- Bernabe Menendrez
- Frank Moro
- David Reynoso
- Carlos Samperio - Samperio decided to leave this film subgenre because according to him it has a negative impact on society.

== See also ==
- Los Tigres Del Norte
- Narco corrido
- Narcoculture in Mexico
