= Bernabé Melendrez =

Mexican action film actor and film director

Bernabé Melendrez, aka "El Gatillero" (born April 12, 1949) is a Mexican action film actor and, after his directorial debut in 2012, film director. He is also a singer.

== Career ==
Melendrez has participated in a number of Mexican movies.

Many of the films he has participated on have been denominated as "narco-peliculas" (Narco-films) because of recurrent stories about drug trafficking.

== Filmography ==
- La muerte persigue a Jesús Pérez. La fuerza militar, 2016 - actor y director
- El Hijo del Hijo Desobediente ("The Son of the Disobedient Son"), 2014 - actor
- Polleros del Sur ("Southern Poulterer"), 2012 - director
- El As de oro, 2012 - actor y director
- El Charro Juarez ("Charro Juarez"), 2007 - actor
- Indio Quiere Llorar 2 ("The Indian Wants to Cry 2"), 2006 - actor
- El Rey De Los Galleros (loosely translated to "King of the Rooster-Fighters"), 2006 - actor
- Corrido de Juan Martha ("Juan Martha's Corrido"), 2006 - actor
- Los Tres Centenarios, 2005 - actor
- El Cara De Chango 2 ("Monkey Face 2"), 2005 - actor
- Sin Pelos en La Lengua ("Without Mincing Words"), 2005 - actor
- Regalo Caro II ("Expensive Present II"), 2004 - actor
- Narcos y Perros 2 ("Dogs and Drug Dealers 2"), 2003 - actor
- Los Abogados del Diablo ("The Devil's Lawyers"), 2003 - actor
- Los Hijos De Gavino Barrera ("Gavino Barrera's Children"), 2003 - actor
- La Lobo y el Gatillero ("Female Wolf and the Gunman"), 2003 - actor
- Los Hijos del Gallero ("The Cockfighting Fan's Sons"), 2003 - actor
- El Cara de Chango ("Monkey Face") - actor
- La Hija De La Hiena ("The Hyena's Daughter") - actor
- Regalo Caro ("Expensive Present"), 2002 - actor
- El Jefe De La Mafia ("Mafia Boss"), 2002 - actor
- Las Tres Tumbas Parte 2 ("The Three Tombs, Part 2"), 2002 - actor
- El Rey De La Mota (English: The King of Marijuana), 2001 - actor
- Los Dos Federales ("The Two Feds"), 2000 - actor
- Misa De Cuerpo Presente ("Funeral Service with a Body"), 1993 - actor
- Muerte En Tijuana ("Death in Tijuana") - actor
