= Cine Mexicano =

American movie channel

Cine Mexicano is an American television movie channel which is available to DirecTV customers. The channel is also available on YouTube TV. It usually offers narco and comedy films, as well as infomercials. Cine Mexicano was launched in 2004 by Olympusat Inc.

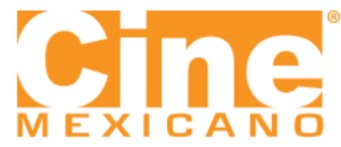
Logo of Cine Mexicano

Cine Mexicano's main competitor is Cinelatino.
