= Adrián Gómez González =

Mexican drug trafficker

Adrián Gómez González was a Mexican drug trafficker and a Sinaloa Cartel drug lord.

Gómez worked as a lieutenant for Miguel Ángel Félix Gallardo during the 1970s and 1980s; when Félix Gallardo was arrested in 1989, his old organization, the Guadalajara Cartel, broke up into two factions: the Tijuana Cartel led by his nephews, the Arellano Félix brothers, and the Sinaloa Cartel, run by former lieutenants Héctor Luis Palma Salazar, Adrián Gómez González, Ismael Zambada García and Joaquín Guzmán Loera (El Chapo). By then, the four Sinaloa Cartel drug lords controlled the Mexican states of Sinaloa, Durango, Chihuahua, Sonora, Nuevo León, and Michoacán.

== See also ==
- Guadalajara Cartel
- War on drugs
- Mexican drug war
