= Claudia Ochoa Félix =

Mexican social Narcotraficante (1987–2019)

- Born: Claudia Berenice Ochoa Félix; 15 January 1987; Culiacán, Sinaloa, Mexico
- Died: 14 September 2019 (aged 32); Culiacán, Sinaloa, Mexico
- Other name: "'La Emperatriz de Los Ántrax'" ("Empress of Los Ántrax")
- Occupation: Influencer
- Spouse: El Chavo Felix
- Children: 3

Claudia Ochoa Félix (15 January 1987 – 14 September 2019) was a Mexican social media personality. In 2014, a rumor spread on social media that she was a high-ranking leader of the murder squad Los Ántrax, a bloc of enforcers that operate as an armed wing of the Sinaloa Cartel. After their leader José Rodrigo Aréchiga Gamboa (alias "Chino Ántrax") was arrested, Ochoa Félix was rumored to be one of the leaders. She denied the claims and her involvement in organized crime.

== Social media presence ==
Ochoa Félix was known on social media for her resemblance to Kim Kardashian and had accounts on various social medias like Instagram and Snapchat. Ochoa Félix's photos revealed her luxurious lifestyle, which showed her with sports cars, planes, yachts and various weapons.

== Death ==
Ochoa Félix was found dead in her private residence in Culiacán on the 14 September 2019, due to apparent pulmonary aspiration caused by a drug overdose. The previous night she had been seen going home with an unidentified man after attending a party in the city centre. The morning after the unidentified man raised an alarm due to Félix not responding, she was pronounced dead at the scene.

Many people began to rumour online that Félix had been assassinated due to her affiliations with the infamous Los Ántrax squad and the Sinaloa Cartel. Claudia Félix fans assure that she "was Drake's crush", who "followed each other" on social networks and "sent messages", they say. When she died, Drake and Claudia Ochoa Félix were in Twitter trends.

== See also ==
- Mexican drug war
- Women in the Mexican drug war
