= Narcocorrido =

Type of narrative ballad originating in Mexico

- Stylistic origins: Polka, ranchera, norteño, corrido, banda
- Cultural origins: Early 20th century Mexico
- Derivative forms: Country

Regional scenes
- Mexico (with origins in the states of Sinaloa, Baja California, Sonora, Chihuahua, Zacatecas, Nuevo León, Durango, Tamaulipas, Jalisco, and Michoacán) United States (notably in the states of Arizona, California, Nevada, New Mexico, and Texas) Central America (notably in El Salvador, Honduras and Guatemala) South America (notably in Colombia, Peru, and Bolivia)

A narcocorrido (Spanish pronunciation: [naɾkokoˈriðo], "narco-corrido" or drug ballad) is a subgenre of the regional Mexican corrido (narrative ballad) genre, from which several other genres have evolved. This type of music is heard and produced on both sides of the Mexico–United States border. It uses a danceable, polka, waltz or mazurka rhythmic base. The lyrics tend to speak approvingly of illegal activities, mainly drug trafficking.

The first corridos that focus on drug smugglers—the narco comes from "narcotics"—have been dated by Juan Ramírez-Pimienta to the 1930s. Early corridos (non-narco) go back as far as the Mexican Revolution of 1910, telling the stories of revolutionary fighters. Music critics have also compared narcocorrido lyrics and style to gangster rap and mafioso rap.

Narcocorrido lyrics refer to particular events and include real dates and places.

== History ==
This genre of music is the evolution of traditional corrido ballads of the Mexican-US border region, which stemmed from the 16th-century Spanish genre of romance. In the late 1980s and early 90s, Chalino Sánchez contributed to narcocorridos. Known throughout Mexico as "El Pelavacas" (Cow Skin Peeler) and "Mi Compa" (My Friend), Chalino was a Mexican immigrant living in Los Angeles. He began distributing his music for a sale price. His lyrics dealt with love, betrayal and the reality of life in Mexico. Soon he was selling mass copies. Chalino Sánchez was murdered in 1992 after a concert in Culiacán. In death, he became a legend and one of the most influential Mexican musicians to emerge from California, he is known throughout the United States and Mexico as El Rey del Corrido (The King of the Corrido).

Various companies, governmental agencies, and individuals have sought to ban narcocorridos. These attempts include a voluntary radio station black-out in Baja California. Representative Casio Carlos Narváez explained that radio executives did not want to make "people who break the laws of our country into heroes and examples". Former President of Mexico Vicente Fox also proposed banning narcocorridos. On the other hand, former Mexican foreign secretary Jorge Castaneda has argued that "corridos are attempts by Mexican society to come to terms with the world around them...You cannot blame narcocorridos for drug violence. Drug violence is to blame for narcocorridos".

== Lyrical content ==
Musical video of "La Corona", a narcocorrido sung by El Komander

Since music plays an important role and major influence in the narcoculture in Mexico, some songs have been tagged as "anthems" and banned from airplay in Mexico and parts of the United States. However, the banning has failed in Mexico because the music is still displayed and available on several radio stations in the United States, near the border with Mexico, which still reaches the northern Mexico audience, while another important point of narcocorrido distribution method has been the internet for listening and downloading. Pirated (bootleg) copies of this music are sold in the "tianguis" (outdoor and flea markets).

Narcocorridos describe the lives of the poor, the destitute, and those who seek power through illegal means. Like hip-hop and rap music, the narcocorrido is heard by many Spanish speakers who vary in age, and is popular among people who are not associated with cartels or gangs. The genre is becoming mainstream in many Spanish-speaking countries in recent years, along with the emergence of narco-subcultures and drug consumption cultures; it is now entering countries like Guatemala, Honduras, Colombia, Peru and Bolivia, where the music is available on an everyday basis.

Examples of such anthems include:

- "En Preparacion" (In Preparation) (a song that refers to the life of violent sinaloa cartel lieutenant Manuel Torres Félix known as "El Ondeado", brother of Javier Torres known as "El J.T.") by singer Gerardo Ortíz
- "El Señor de los Cielos" (The Lord of the Skies) (refers to Drug lord Amado Carrillo) by singer Los Plebes del Rancho de Ariel Camacho
- "A Mis Enemigos" (To My Enemies) by Valentín Elizalde
- "El Coco" (The coke head) by El Halcon de la Sierra
- "Nave 727" (refers to the "Boeing 727" aircraft) by Grupo Laberinto
- "Cuerno de Chivo" ("Goat's Horn", Spanish slang for AK-47 rifle) by Los Huracanes del Norte
- "Mis Tres Animales" (My Three Animals) (refers to the three top selling Mexican narcotics: cocaine, marijuana and heroin). by Los Tucanes de Tijuana
- "El Macho Prieto" (a supposed tribute to drug trafficker Gonzalo Inzunza Inzunza) by Luis Salomon "El Arremangado"
- "Ajustes Inzunza" (Retaliations Inzunza) (dedicated to the hitman squad led by Gonzalo Inzunza Inzunza) by Colmillo Norteño
- "La Vida Mafiosa" (The Mafia Life) by Los Canelos de Durango
- "El Chapo Guzmán" (a tribute to Sinaloa cartel drug lord Joaquín "Chapo" Guzmán) by Los Tucanes de Tijuana
- "El Jefe de Jefes" (The Boss of Bosses) (dedicated to Miguel Ángel Félix Gallardo) by Los Tigres del Norte
- "Chuy y Mauricio" (Jesus and Maurice) by Los Canelos de Durango
- "Chingon de Chingones" (The Badass of Badasses) by Los Razos de Sacramento y Reynaldo
- "Los Duros de Colombia" (The Colombia Hardhitters) by Gerardo Ortiz
- "JGL" (a tribute to Sinaloa cartel drug lord Joaquín "Chapo" Guzmán) by Luis R. Conriquez and La Adictiva
- "El Sr. Mayo Zambada" (Mr. Mayo Zambada) (a song dedicated to Sinaloa cartel top Drug lord, Ismael "Mayo" Zambada) by Enigma Norteño.
- "El Regreso Del Chapo" (The Return of El Chapo) by El Komander
- "Pancho Loco" (Crazy Frank) by Roberto Tapia
- "El Corrido de Los Zetas" (The ballad of the Zetas) by Beto Quintanilla (Dedicated to the infamous enforcer gang Los Zetas)
- "Corrido a Felix Gallardo" (dedicated to Miguel Ángel Félix Gallardo) by Los Jilgueros Del Pico Real
- "Miguel Angel" (dedicated to Miguel Ángel Félix Gallardo) by Dareyes de la Sierra
- "Cambié Mi Destino" by Juan y Los de Waste Water College

This verse of the song "El Cabron" (1998) by Los Capos is an example of typical narcocorrido subject matter.

Original Spanish verse:

Desde que yo era chiquillo tenia fintas de cabrón; ya le pegaba al perico, y a la mota con más razón
Es que en mi México lindo ahí cualquiera es cabrón

Exact English translation:

Ever since I was a lad [child] I had the fame of a badass, already hittin' the parrot [cocaine] and blowing dope [cannabis] with more reason
It's because in my beloved Mexico anyone there is a badass.

=== Movimiento alterado ===
A recent trend of hyper-violent narcocorridos has been labeled Movimiento alterado, a Spanish term translated as Agitated movement or the Altered movement, The name is a reference to the physiological effect of cocaine consumption, an altered state of mind.

In the same way that normal narcocorrido lyrics contrast with old traditional corridos (that narrated stories about revolutionaries, "benevolent bandits" or that attempted to give moral message), the lyrics of the 'Movimiento Alterado' songs contrast with previous narcocorridos. More traditional narcocorridos romanticized the trafficking lifestyle, but used many euphemisms (with words like "polvo" (powder) for cocaine and "cuerno" (horn) for the AK-47), and kept violence at a minimum (used only when or where a tragic event occurred).

However, in the Movimiento alterado trend, the songs cynically and deliberately express the pride that modern narcotraffickers have in murdering, torturing, beheading, and dismembering their rivals, using explicit descriptions of their exploits, and also naming the military grade weaponry they use (grenade throwers, body armor, "bazucas", AR15, 50 caliber bullets, knives etc.)

The lyrics of a famous Movimiento alterado song, dedicated to the notorious cartel enforcer Manuel Torres Félix, starts as follows:

With an AK-47 and a bazooka behind my head
cross my path and I'll chop your head off
I'm crazy and I like to kill my enemies,
we're the best at kidnapping
We are always in a posse with bullet-proof vests, ready to execute.

The songs under this trend have been also labeled as:

- corridos arremangados (rolled-up sleeves ballads)
- corridos alterados (alertness ballads)
- corridos progresivos (progressive ballads)
- corridos enfermos (sick or insane ballads)

== Relation to crime ==
=== As money laundering scheme ===
In Mexico, parts of South America and some regions of the US south border it is common to hear the sudden appearance of "new artists", mainly in folk radio stations, who are not known in the music industry, have no previous career and with no explanation of where they come from. These music groups and singers start to appear consistently on radio, television and public broadcasts with a strong promotion of their concerts. This happens for a fixed amount of time, and in the same sudden way they appear, they stop their promotion and disappear from the music scene, or change their stage name. Such artists are commonly manufactured by producers of dubious origin, who pay payola and do events in order to launder money from drug trafficking, prostitution or other illegal operations.

=== Violence ===
Between 2006 and 2008, over a dozen prominent Mexican musicians, many of them connected to the narcocorrido genre, were murdered. The violence came in the midst of the Mexican drug war. The most popular musicians killed were Valentín Elizalde and Sergio Gómez, the lead singer of Chicago-based Duranguense band K-Paz de la Sierra. In December 2007, both men were nominated posthumously for Grammy Awards in the banda category. On June 26, 2010, Sergio Vega, known as El Shaka, was gunned down in Sinaloa state. He was shot dead only hours after he had denied reports of his own murder. Ramiro Caro, Gerardo Ortiz's manager and cousin, was also killed when Ortiz's Chevy Suburban was attacked by men with AK-47's in an attempt to kill Ortiz. Ortiz escaped unhurt.

Other murdered music industry figures include Javier Morales Gómez (a singer for Los Implacables del Norte), four members of Tecno Banda Fugaz, four members of Los Padrinos de la Sierra, Zayda Peña (a singer for Zayda Y Los Culpables), trumpeter José Luis Aquino of Los Conde, record producer Marco Abdalá, manager Roberto del Fierro Lugo, Jorge Antonio Sepúlveda, Jesús Rey David Alfaro Pulido, Nicolás Villanueva of tropical group Brisas del Mar, four members of Los Herederos de Sinaloa, and the singer Fabian Ortega Pinon (El Halcon de la Sierra), who was executed along with Manuel Saenz and one other victim in Chihuahua on October 19, 2010. Additionally, three members of Explosión Norteña were shot and wounded in Tijuana, in August 2006.

While few, if any, arrests have been made in these cases, experts and musicians themselves say that the murders can be explained by many Mexican musicians' proximity to drug traffickers. Some speculate the killings could be related to romantic disputes and jealousy. Others cite cases in which a musician has written a song praising or criticizing a drug trafficker; many assert that Valentín Elizalde's murder, for example, was related to his song, "A Mis Enemigos", which some interpreted as an attack on the Gulf Cartel following its appearance in a widespread YouTube video.

There has been debate about the motives behind the killings and about whether or not the media has exaggerated the trend. Narcocorrido expert Elijah Wald has disputed the assumption that any of the murders were related or that musicians on the whole are targets for drug traffickers. But given the grisly nature of the murders, some of which were accompanied by torture and disfigurement, few people doubt that drug cartel hitmen are to blame.

In the wake of the high-profile murders of Elizalde and Gómez, among others, some prominent corrido musicians postponed concert dates in certain parts of Mexico. Narcocorrido singers travel with relative ease and security inside the United States, but many Mexican American narcocorrido singers take extra precautions while venturing into Mexico by hiring extra security, traveling in well-guarded caravans, not being as open to the public in larger concerts, and limiting their tours in high violence cities in Mexico. Others have said they are afraid to sing narcocorridos in public for fear of offending the wrong person. Likewise, some vendors of narcocorrido CDs have reported low sales, citing fear among listeners of buying a CD featuring songs favoring one group of traffickers over another. The Zetas cartel has been known to torture and kill online and social media bloggers who speak about them. In one incident, the tortured and mutilated bodies of a man and a woman who had posted about cartels on social media were found hanging off a bridge in the city of Nuevo León, in September 2011. A sign stating, "This is going to happen to all the Internet busybodies", was found next to them signed with the letter Z.

== Growing popularity in the United States ==
Recently, much of the new narcocorridos music is being aimed directly at the American market, and produced mainly by Mexican-American entrepreneurs. Like many other concerts or sport events, many corrido artists are choosing American cities as venues for the ability to fill the concert halls at higher ticket prices than would be affordable by the average Mexican citizen. Many of the music and CDs are distributed by American labels as well as videos intended solely to be sold in the United States.

The growing popularity of the music in the US is correlated with Mexican immigration. Over a quarter of the residents of the Los Angeles area are now Mexican, and they have brought this folk music style with them. Narcocorridos are now played in LA clubs, on radio stations, and do not have the negative stigma attached to them by some in Mexico, this is mainly because the Spanish lyrics are only understood by Hispanophones, and the distance American society has with the reality of Mexico, makes them feel they are only listening to works of art and fiction.

== In art, entertainment and media ==
=== Films ===
Mexploitation films, especially the subgenre narcocinema, feature narcocorridos. Many of these feature appearances by famous narcocorrido singers and are rumored to be financed by drug lords themselves (although only a few cases of the latter have been proven). Some other films which feature narcocorridos include:

- Al Otro Lado (2006, To the Other Side)
- Narco Cultura (2013, Narco Culture)

=== Radio ===
On the radio, airplay of narcocorridos has increased significantly in recent years. Although illegal in Mexico, given the prohibition of lyrical content promoting crime and violence, US-based Spanish-speaking stations have promoted artists such as Larry Hernández, El Compa Chuy, and El Potro de Sinaloa, and songs such as "El Katch", "El Piloto Canavis" ("The Cannabis Pilot"), and "El Señor de la Hummer" ("The Man with the Hummer") have increased the genre's popularity. Listener requests have helped to overcome radio stations' reluctance to play this type of music.

=== Television ===
- In 2008, the Fox TV show America's Most Wanted mentioned the genre while depicting the case of a criminal wanted for murder and trafficking, who may be traveling back and forth between Mexico and the United States.
- Breaking Bad season 2, episode 7 ("Negro y Azul"), opens with a narcocorrido by Los Cuates de Sinaloa, co-written by Vince Gilligan and inspired by the events depicted in the series.
- In the CSI: Crime Scene Investigation episode "Snakes" (2005), a freelance reporter who has gone undercover in the narcocorrido-producing subculture is killed for writing an article critical of the genre.
- In Law & Order season 20, episode 7, a narcocorrido is used as evidence in a murder.
- "Tuyo" ("Yours"), the theme song of the Netflix Original series Narcos (which debuted in September 2015), is a Spanish-language narcocorrido written and vocalized by Rodrigo Amarante, which reflects the type of music drug kingpin Pablo Escobar's mother would have listened to when raising her son. The song debuted at No. 6 on the Latin Pop Digital Songs around the 2015 series premiere and was nominated for a Primetime Emmy Award for Outstanding Main Title Theme Music.
- The Shield season 3 episode, "Safe", contains a narcocorrido about an unrequited love and the murder of a woman. Later evidence proves that the "victim" is alive and living with her boyfriend, so the narcocorrido turned out to be fake. After finding several bodies of people killed by meth lab exposure, the detectives use corridos based on true stories to close cases.
- NCIS: Los Angeles season 4 episode, "Resurrection", featured a young narcocorrido singer who was sponsored by a cartel boss and witnessed his illegal activities.

=== Video games ===
- In the 2017 video game Tom Clancy's Ghost Recon Wildlands, the fictional Santa Blanca Drug Cartel (a dangerous drug cartel from Mexico), which has taken control of Bolivia, has a radio station called Radio Santa Blanca, which plays reggaeton and narco-corrido. In the game's lore, the most famous narco-corrido singer is Marcelo Rios. Rios has many fans worldwide and in the Santa Blanca Cartel. He works for Santa Blanca's Influence branch as "El Chido" (The Cool), and plays his songs on Radio Santa Blanca.
