= Mexploitation =

Film genre

El Mariachi (1992) is a noted Mexplotiation film

Mexploitation (sometimes called Cabrito Western or Mexican video-home) is a film genre of low-budget films that combine elements of an exploitation film and Mexican culture or portrayals of Mexican life within Mexico often dealing with crime, drug trafficking, money and sex.

== Mexican narco-cinema ==
The Mexican narco-cine (Spanish for narco-cinema) or narco-películas (Spanish for narco-films/narco-movies), are a subgenre of the Mexploitation style films, focused solely on the violence and luxurious lives of drug lords and cartels. The title and the storyline of these films are usually inspired by popular narco corridos (drug ballads, drug songs), and are marketed as low budget tie-in merchandising to the narcocorrido songs. Sometimes these films feature famous narco-corrido singers on them, and are rumored to be financed by drug lords themselves. However, only a few such cases have been proven.

== Common qualities ==
Mexploitation movies made in the 1960s and 1970s in Mexico were closer to their American exploitation film counterparts, with low-budget science-fiction films that often starred Mexican professional wrestlers (or luchadores) such as El Santo and Huracan Ramirez.

In the early 1980s and 1990s there was a notable change with films increasingly dealing with real-life issues such as drug cartels and the murders of their rivals. Notable actors in these films include Mario Almada, Hugo Stiglitz, Sergio Goyri, Valentin Trujillo, Jorge Reynoso, Rodolfo de Anda, Fernando Almada, Rosa Gloria Chagoyán and David Reynoso.

The director Robert Rodriguez has been considered a pioneer of Mexploitation in the United States. His first film, El Mariachi, contains many Mexploitation elements and his 2007 film, Planet Terror, contained a fake trailer which developed into a feature film called Machete (2010), which contains many familiar elements of the genre.

== K. Gordon Murray ==
Exploitation film producer and distributor named K. Gordon Murray acquired a unique collection of horror films in Mexico which began to appear on American late-night television and drive-in screens in the 1960s. Ranging from monster movies clearly owing to the heyday of Universal Studios, to the lucha libre horror films featuring El Santo and the "Wrestling Women" alongside the 1959 Christmas classic "Santa Claus", these low-budget films are still notably campy and inspired a small cult following.

== See also ==
- Zapata Western
- Narcoculture in Mexico
- Exploitation film
- Mexican Ficheras films
