= Los Ántrax =

Mexican crime gang

- Founders: José Rodrigo Aréchiga Gamboa; René Velázquez Valenzuela
- Named after: Anthrax (Disease)
- Founding location: Culiacán, Sinaloa, Mexico
- Ethnicity: Mexican
- Leader: Rafael Guadalupe Félix Núñez
- Activities: Murder, kidnapping, drug trafficking
- Allies: Sinaloa Cartel; Gente Nueva; La Mayiza
- Rivals: La Chapiza; Los Chapitos; Los Mazatlecos; Los Zetas; Mexican Army; Cártel de los Beltrán-Leyva

Los Ántrax is a large enforcer unit and hit squad for the Sinaloa Cartel, a major crime syndicate based in the Mexican state of Sinaloa. The group was led by the drug lords Jesús Victoriano (alias "El 20"), José Rodrigo Aréchiga Gamboa (alias "El Chino Ántrax"), René Velázquez Valenzuela (alias "El Sargento Phoenix"), among others, and they are responsible for a number of homicides and for providing armed security services to Ismael El Mayo Zambada. The gang operates in the capital city of Culiacán, Sinaloa, where its members conduct homicides and violent attacks. Los Antrax is the Sinaloa Cartel's largest and deadliest enforcer unit.

== Etymology ==
The name of the group is inspired from the bacterium spores anthrax, a potentially fatal infectious disease that has been used before as a bioweapon.

== History ==
Los Ántrax worked as the security force of the drug lord Ismael El Mayo Zambada (now arrested), who leads the Sinaloa Cartel along with Joaquín El Chapo Guzmán (now also arrested). Several homicides have been attributed to the gang, which was led by a drug trafficker named Rodrigo Arechiga Gamboa (El Chino Antrax), who died on May 15, 2020, and his right-hand man Jesus Peña (El 20). Peña escaped from a prison in Sinaloa on March 16, 2017, with four other suspects, including alleged Ántrax member Rafael Guadalupe Félix Núñez (alias "Changuito Ántrax") and Juan José Esparragoza Monzón, son of Juan José Esparragoza Moreno.

=== Tubutama, Sonora shooting ===
A fierce gunfight between members of the Sinaloa Cartel (with the backing of Los Ántrax) and the Beltrán Leyva Cartel (with the support of Los Zetas) left about 30 dead in the town of Tubutama, Sonora in northern Mexico on 1 July 2010. The drug gangs clashed just a few miles across the international border from the U.S. state of Arizona – an area notorious for being a smuggling route for narcotics and human trafficking. Eleven late-model, bullet-ridden vehicles were found at the scene, along with dozens of high caliber assault rifles. Some of the vehicles had "X" painted on their windows, a method often used by the Mexican drug trafficking organizations to distinguish the vehicles of rival drug cartels during armed confrontations.

=== Mexican Army torture allegations ===
Los Ántrax gained public attention on 26 May 2011, when a squadron of the Mexican Army that was patrolling a neighborhood in southern Culiacán spotted three vehicles with armed assailants. The encounter prompted a gunfight, but the Mexican forces managed to neutralize three members of Los Ántrax; they also liberated three kidnapping victims from a safe house in the area (a woman; a man who had his toes and ears mutilated; and a 5-year-old girl). Although preliminary reports indicated that the three gunmen killed by the army – Jesús Humberto Corona Guillén, Franklin Olguín Velázquez and Pedro Valenzuela Meza – had died from gunshot wounds during the shootout, the post-mortem reports indicated that the gunmen had been beaten and tortured by the soldiers before being killed, even though the official account of the event was that they "died in a gun battle."

=== Assassination of Arce Rubio ===
On 1 November 2011, during an indoor football game in Culiacán, Sinaloa, an armed commando interrupted the game and killed Francisco Arce Rubio, the leader of Los Ántrax. According to police reports, several armed men carrying AK-47s and handguns interrupted the soccer game at the Deportivo Jimmy Ruiz stadium and forced all of the players to lie face down on the field at around 11:00 p.m. Once they had subjugated everyone on the field, the gunmen executed one of the team's managers, and then went on to kill Arce Rubio (aged 30). After the double-homicide, the gunmen departed.

Arce Rubio was reportedly killed by rival members of Los Mazatlecos, a gang headed by Fausto Isidro Meza Flores, nicknamed El Chapo Isidro. Arce Rubio was also reportedly responsible for assassinating two nephews of Amado and Vicente Carrillo Fuentes in Sinaloa. Meza Flores and his gang are reportedly part of the Beltrán Leyva Cartel, which disputes the drug trafficking corridors with the Sinaloa Cartel in western Mexico.

The weekend Arce Rubio was killed, the state of Sinaloa experienced at least 20 homicides possibly linked to the drug lord's death. In one incident, gang members hung three bodies from a bridge in the town of Guamúchil. In another incident at a volleyball court in Culiacán, unidentified gunmen killed 8 people and injured several others. Several other bullet-ridden corpses were found throughout the state that same weekend.

== Chino Ántrax's arrest, death and other events ==
El Chino Ántrax was arrested by Dutch police on 30 December 2013 at Amsterdam Airport Schiphol in the Netherlands at the request of the United States, which contacted Interpol to arrest him for charges relating to drug trafficking. On 20 February 2014, Mexican authorities arrested Jesús Peña (alias "El 20"), in Culiacán following a massive operative carried out to capture "El Mayo" Zambada. On 23 May 2014, Melesio Beltrán Medina (alias "El Mele") was killed in the Morelos neighborhood in Culiacán.

Following the arrest of Chino Antrax, some British sources claimed that Claudia Ochoa Félix was the new leader of the group. This information was not officially confirmed and she has denied her involvement in organized crime. Ochoa Félix was found dead in her private residence in Culiacán on the 14th of September 2019, due to apparent pulmonary aspiration caused by a drug overdose. The previous night she had been seen going home with an unidentified man after attending a party in the city centre. The morning after the unidentified man raised an alarm due to Félix not responding; she was pronounced dead at the scene.

On 3 March 2020, Chino Antrax was released from prison and transferred to house arrest. On May 9, however, his probation office reported him as missing. On 15 May 2020, Chino Antrax was found dead in Sinaloa, after being murdered alongside two other people, including his sister.

== See also ==
- List of gangs in Mexico
