= Gonzalo Inzunza Inzunza =

Mexican drug trafficker (1971–2013)

- Born: 17 August 1971; Navolato, Sinaloa, Mexico
- Died: 18 December 2013 (aged 42); Puerto Peñasco, Sonora, Mexico
- Cause of death: Gunshot wounds
- Other names: Aliases: MP; El Once; El Macho Prieto; El Inzu; Bernabé León Andrade; Gonzalo Inzunza Araujo; Apache
- Organization: Sinaloa Cartel leader
- Criminal charge: Drug trafficking

Gonzalo Inzunza Inzunza (17 August 1971 – 18 December 2013), commonly referred to by his alias El Macho Prieto, was a Mexican suspected drug lord and high-ranking leader of the Sinaloa Cartel, a criminal group based in Sinaloa, Mexico. He worked as the cartel's assassins chief under the tutelage of Ismael "El Mayo" Zambada and as the regional leader of the cartel in the states of Baja California and Sonora. His base of operations was in Mexicali, where he coordinated marijuana and cocaine shipments through the Calexico–Mexicali border region. On 18 December 2013, Inzunza was killed in a shootout with Mexican authorities in the resort area of Puerto Peñasco, Sonora. Before the gunfight was over, several of his gunmen took the corpse of the drug lord with them.

== Early life ==
Inzunza was born in Culiacán, Sinaloa, Mexico on 17 August 1971. (Note: His birth certificate is from Culiacán but other records state that he was born in Navolato, Sinaloa.) His father René Inzunza was from La Vuelta, a rural community close to Culiacán; like many others who lived in the Sinaloan countryside, his father was involved in the drug trade, but he died when Inzunza was still a teenager. Born into a middle-class family, Inzunza attended grade and middle school at Colegio Sinaloa, a religious institution. He committed his first homicide when he was 19; one night during a party at his house, he shot a man dead after the man laughed at him. He fled thereafter to the state of Sonora and got involved in drug trafficking and organized crime.

== Sinaloa Cartel Tenure ==
Inzunza worked for the drug lord Ismael "El Mayo" Zambada as his assassins' chief, and operated in Culiacán and in other regions across Sinaloa. The Mexican authorities believe that he may be responsible for over 80 murders during his tenure in Sinaloa, including the killings of at least a dozen police officers.

Throughout his career, Inzunza was able to avoid going to prison several times and intimidate law enforcement; one time in the late 1990s, two patrol cars from the Federal Ministerial Police (PFM) went into a neighborhood where Inzunza was staying to carry out an arrest warrant. Though the police were going after a person who was not involved with the drug lord, his gunmen stopped the PFM cars and ordered them to call their boss. When the police commander arrived at the scene minutes later, Inzunza walked up to him and smacked him several times, telling him he had no permission to be in his territory and to never stop by again. When the drug lord ordered them to leave, his gunmen took away their weapons for a couple of days.

On 12 November 2002 in Culiacán, the Federal Preventive Police (PFP) intercepted a convoy of gunmen in which Inzunza was traveling. A shootout eventually broke out, resulting in the death of four policemen and one gunman. However, Inzunza managed to escape the scene.

Three years later in April 2005, Inzunza intimidated several police officers who were patrolling his neighborhood and forced them to return to their headquarters. On 5 May 2005, Inzunza travelled to Mazatlán to attend a rehab center for his drug addiction. While heading there, he was arrested by the Mazatlán Municipal Police with eight of his men. The police confiscated several assault rifles, handguns, grenades, and grenade launchers. The arrest of Inzunza was initially reported by a photojournalist who managed to take a picture of him, but the drug lord never made it to prison; unconfirmed reports stated that he bribed the police to avoid going to jail. He escaped with Ismael Bernal Cristerna (alias "El Mongol"), an individual who was later killed by Inzunza in 2013 because Inzunza feared betrayal.

=== Cartel infighting ===
The decline of Inzunza's hegemony in the Sinaloa Cartel began in May 2008 when Édgar Guzmán López, son of "El Chapo" Guzmán, was killed by gunmen in Culiacán. During that time, the Sinaloa Cartel was engaged in an internal power struggle with the Beltrán Leyva Cartel. Alfredo Beltrán Leyva was captured by the Mexican Army in January 2008, and his brothers Arturo, Carlos, and Héctor had suspicions that Guzmán had tipped authorities to Alfredo's whereabouts. In an apparent revenge attack, the Beltrán Leyva Cartel reportedly killed Guzmán's son. However, there are also reports that Inzunza might have possibly killed Guzmán López after confusing him with a member of a rival cartel. This episode complicated Inzunza's business relationship with "El Mayo" Zambada, who turned his back on him and refused to give him protection. Around 2010, he was transferred by the top echelons of the Sinaloa Cartel to the states of Baja California and Sonora. His base of operations was in Mexicali, where he coordinated drug trafficking activities. He oversaw Mexicali alongside Cenobio Flores Pacho and/or Luis Fernando Castro Villa (alias "El Checo"), a Sinaloa Cartel associate. The drug lord also oversaw the areas of San Luis Río Colorado, Puerto Peñasco, Nogales, Sonoyta, and Caborca in Sonora. His operational capacity also reached the states of Chiapas, Quintana Roo, Nayarit, Jalisco, and Sinaloa. With the help of his brother, who is identified by Mexican authorities by his alias "El Peque", Inzunza received large quantities of narcotics in Sinaloa from South America. He also had three major smuggling routes across Mexico that he oversaw to move narcotics to the United States. The first route was through a smuggling network that started in Venezuela, crossed through Honduras, Costa Rica, and ended in Sinaloa. The second route started in Chiapas and connected that state with Acapulco, Mexico City, Jalisco, and ended in the U.S. The third and final route started in Sinaloa, crossed through Sonora, Mexicali, Tijuana and ended north of the U.S.-Mexico border. Inzunza was known for using violence to exercise control in the territories he oversaw for the Sinaloa Cartel to move marijuana and cocaine through the Calexico–Mexicali corridor.

Aside from coordinating drug trafficking shipments, Inzunza was responsible for stopping incursions and fighting off rival drug trafficking organizations in Sonora. In particular, the drug lord commanded his forces against the Beltrán Leyva Cartel, which was undergoing a gradual resurgence. In early 2011, Inzunza fled the area of Mexicali and relocated in Baja California after Manuel Torres Félix (alias "The Crazy One") wanted him dead for the "unapproved" murder of Paulo Osorio Payán (alias "El Pablo"), one of his associates. From his safe house in Tijuana, Baja California, the drug lord gave orders in Mexicali. When Torres Félix was killed in a gunfight with the Mexican Army in Sinaloa in October 2012, Inzunza returned to Mexicali to help his business partner "El Checo". Inzunza's tenure in Mexicali was disrupted in 2012 by a group known as "Los Garibay", which was controlled by José Manuel Garibay Félix (alias "El Manuelón" and/or "El Gordo"), a drug trafficker from the Sinaloa Cartel who joined forces with the Jalisco New Generation Cartel (CJNG) while serving prison time in Jalisco. The infighting resulted in multiple killings in Mexicali and the surrounding areas that year. On 23 February 2013, however, Mexican authorities discovered the corpse of Garibay Félix on a highway near Guadalajara, Jalisco. His body bore signs of torture and a bullet hole in the head, usual signs to distinguish common murders from killings committed by organized crime. His death caused the CJNG to break away from its loose connection with the Sinaloa Cartel and operate independently in Jalisco in efforts to fight the Sinaloans for the control of the drug market in the state.

== Bounty ==
Inzunza, also known by his aliases of El Macho Prieto, El MP, El Once, Gonzalo Inzunza Araujo, and/or Bernabé León Andrade, was placed on the most-wanted drug traffickers list under the Foreign Narcotics Kingpin Designation Act by the U.S. government on 1 June 2011, along with Manuel Torres Félix, another high-ranking lieutenant of the Sinaloa Cartel. This act prohibited U.S. citizens from doing any kind of business deal with the drug lord and froze its assets. The Procuraduría General de la República (PGR) offered up to $3 million Mexican pesos (US$230,000) for information leading to their arrests. Inzunza was among Mexico's 122 most-wanted criminals, according to the list provided by the PGR database. He had three arrests warrants in Mexico and a provisional detention request with extradition purposes from the U.S. government for pending drug trafficking charges.

== Death ==
Inzunza was killed in a gunfight with Mexican Marines in Puerto Peñasco, Sonora, on 18 December 2013. The Sonora authorities confirmed that the shootout, which occurred at around 04:00 A.M. that day, left a total of five dead and three vehicles incinerated. Authorities confirmed that two gunmen were killed on the scene during the firefight, while two others died by wrecking their vehicle while attempting to flee the crime scene; the remaining gunman died of gunshot wound complications. Preliminary reports stated that gunmen held several hostages at a hotel during the raging gunfire, but the Sonora authorities denied the authenticity of these initial reports. The shootout was reported to have lasted at least four hours. An eye-witness close to the crime scene said to the press that a police helicopter was involved in the fire exchange from mid-air with the gunmen, who fired at the chopper from the ground.

According to initial reports, the incident began when the Mexican authorities chased a white Chevrolet pick-up truck in Sonoyta, Sonora following a reported homicide; the police later caught up to the vehicle in Puerto Peñasco after the men in the vehicle opened fire on them. Other reports issued a few days after the shooting stated that Mexican authorities raided the property where the drug lord was staying after they had tracked down his location. Following the shootout, the local authorities ordered the school district of Puerto Peñasco to suspend classes for the day. The U.S. Consulate in Nogales, Sonora, issued a travel warning through Twitter advising U.S. tourists to stay indoors until the gunfire was over. Puerto Peñasco (known in English as "Rocky Point") is Sonora's major tourist attraction and a common hotspot for U.S. citizens given its 50 mi (80.4 km) proximity from the U.S.-Mexico border.

=== Investigation and aftermath ===
On 19 December 2013, Mexican authorities confirmed in a press conference that the corpse of Inzunza was stolen by alleged gunmen of the Sinaloa Cartel during the shootout. Investigators, however, identified the drug lord due to the DNA tests conducted at the crime scene. Authorities were also able to intercept the phone call lines of the criminals involved in the shootout and confirm that the drug lord was killed. The Peñasco city spokesman confirmed a couple of days later that the shootout begun precisely inside the Bella Sirena complex, a beachfront villa where Inzunza was possibly staying for the holidays. He insisted that neither the drug lord nor any of his men involved in the shootout lived in Peñasco. Mexican authorities also provided more details of the shootout in the days following the gunfight; they confirmed that two Black Hawk helicopters were used in the operation, and that there were at least 10 vehicles of the alleged gunmen of the Sinaloa Cartel present during the fire exchange. The police confirmed that they found 14 high-calibre assault rifles at the scene. They also confirmed that five criminals were killed in the shootout (not six, as stated by other sources) and two officers were wounded. The authorities also confirmed that they had an undercover federal agent staying at the complex where Inzunza was hiding for about 15 days prior to the shooting. By spying on him throughout the day and passing that information to his counterparts, authorities were able to use those intelligence reports to hunt down the drug lord.

Investigators believe that some of the top leaders of the Sinaloa Cartel might have tipped off the authorities as to Inzunza's whereabouts. This line of investigation alleges that during his time in the cartel, Inzunza killed "people of his same company" and then denied culpability. Therefore, investigators believe that given the drug lord's disobedience in the eyes of his leaders, the cartel gave the order to execute him in the first days of December 2013. The leaders reportedly decided to oust Inzunza by betraying his whereabouts to the Mexican government in a plan to get him arrested or killed.

== See also ==
- Mexican drug war

== Sources ==
=== Bibliography ===
- Gible, John (2011). To Die in Mexico: Dispatches from Inside the Drug War. City Lights Books. ISBN 978-0872865761.
- Lizárraga, Gustavo (22 December 2013). Las últimas horas de "El Macho Prieto" (in Spanish). El Debate de Sinaloa. p. 6. Archived from the original on 23 December 2013.
