= Metropolitan Correctional Center, San Diego =

Prison in San Diego, California, United States

Coordinates: 32°42′50″N 117°9′57″W

- Interactive map of Metropolitan Correctional Center, San Diego
- Location: San Diego, California
- Status: Operational
- Security class: Administrative security
- Population: 1,000
- Managed by: Federal Bureau of Prisons

The Metropolitan Correctional Center, San Diego (MCC San Diego) is a United States federal administrative detention facility in San Diego, California, United States. It holds male and female prisoners of all security levels. It is operated by the Federal Bureau of Prisons, a division of the United States Department of Justice.

Most prisoners held at MCC San Diego have pending cases in the United States District Court for the Southern District of California. MCC San Diego also holds prisoners serving brief sentences. MCC San Diego is an administrative facility designed to house federal prisoners of all security levels, including both male and female offenders. The building is 23 stories and can house 1,300 inmates.

== History ==
MCC San Diego opened in December 1974 and represented the first shift within the Bureau of Prisons to a new generation of high-rise prison buildings, along with MCC New York and MCC Chicago.

== Notable incidents ==
On March 18, 2011, the office of Laura E. Duffy, the US attorney for the Southern District of California, announced that Brandon McKinney, a former correctional officer at MCC San Diego, had been indicted on suspicion of having sexual relations with a female inmate while on duty on July 20, 2010. Since sexual relationships between prison staff and inmates are prohibited by law regardless of consent, McKinney was terminated and charged with assault. McKinney subsequently pleaded guilty and was sentenced to 10 months in prison on August 10, 2012.

Duffy's office issued a press release on July 18, 2013 announcing that Kirk Borja, an inmate at MCC San Diego, had pleaded guilty to conspiring to distribute methamphetamine and possessing heroin with the intent to distribute it. Borja was originally indicted on the methamphetamine trafficking charge following his arrest in January 2012 as part of Operation Carnalismo, an investigation into the Mexican Mafia gang. Borja also admitted in his plea to concealing heroin inside his body while he was at MCC San Diego and planning to distribute it to other inmates before it was discovered by correctional officers. Borja is still being held at MCC San Diego pending sentencing.

== Notable inmates (current and former) ==
Inmate Name	Register Number	Photo	Status	Details
Fidel Villarreal	14217-298		Transferred to Long Beach Residential Reentry Management. Serving a 30-year sentence; scheduled for release on December 20, 2026.	Brothers and former US Border Patrol Agents; convicted in 2012 of operating a human smuggling ring which brought over 1,000 illegal immigrants into the US from Mexico in exchange for $1 million in bribes.
Raul Villarreal	14218-298		Transferred to FCI Milan. Serving a 30-year sentence; scheduled for release on August 28, 2031.	Brothers and former US Border Patrol Agents; convicted in 2012 of operating a human smuggling ring which brought over 1,000 illegal immigrants into the US from Mexico in exchange for $1 million in bribes.
John Timothy Earnest	85152-298		Transferred to California Men's Colony. Serving a federal sentence of life plus 30 years, consecutive to his state sentence of life plus 137 years.	Perpetrator of the Poway synagogue shooting, which killed one woman and injured three others. Convicted in federal court of 54 counts of violating the Matthew Shepard and James Byrd Jr. Hate Crimes Prevention Act, 55 counts of violating the Church Arson Prevention Act, and four firearms offenses.
José Rodrigo Aréchiga Gamboa	42130-298		Released from custody on March 3, 2020.	Mexican professional hitman, drug lord and high-ranking leader of the Sinaloa Cartel. Pleaded guilty in 2015 to conspiracy to import cocaine and marijuana into the United States. Aréchiga Gamboa absconded from his probation on May 6, 2020, and was found murdered in Sinaloa on May 16.

== See also ==
- List of U.S. federal prisons
- Federal Bureau of Prisons
- Incarceration in the United States
