= Vicente Zambada Niebla =

Mexican drug lord (1975)

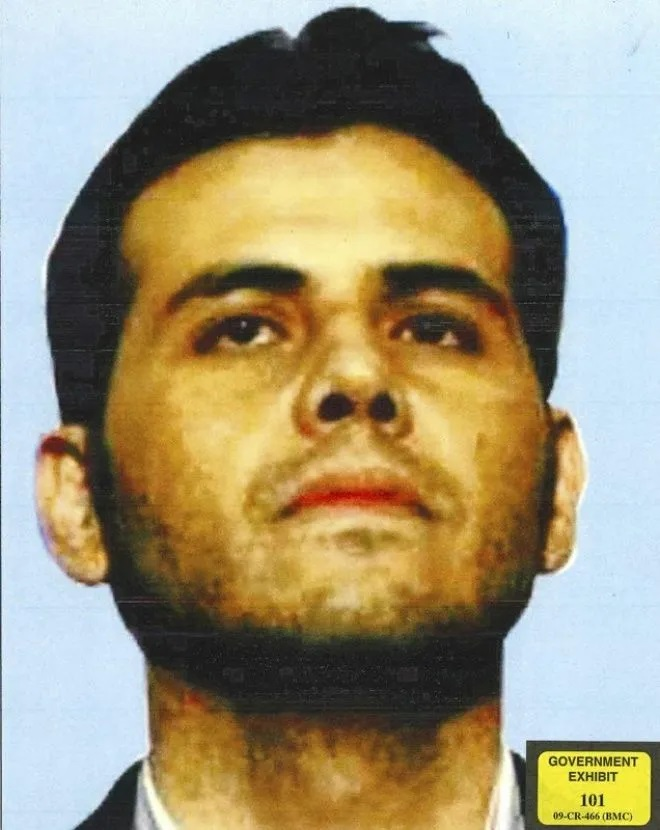
- Born: 10 May 1975 (age 51); Culiacán, Sinaloa, Mexico
- Other names: El Vicentillo; Jesus Antonio Domínguez Lopez; Miguel Angel Hernández Peña
- Occupation: Sinaloa Cartel drug lord
- Known for: Illegal drug trafficking
- Parent: Ismael "El Mayo" Zambada (father)
- Penalty: 15 years in prison

Notes
- Extradited to the United States. Rewards: US$2 million offered by the Mexican Government, and the U.S. DEA is offering $5 million.

Jesús Vicente Zambada Niebla (born 10 May 1975), also known as "El Vicentillo", is a Mexican convicted drug lord and former high-ranking member of the Sinaloa Cartel, a criminal group based in Sinaloa. He is the son of Ismael "El Mayo" Zambada, who was one of Mexico's most-wanted drug lords. He was arrested in Mexico City on 19 March 2009 and extradited to the United States in February 2010 to stand trial on narco-trafficking-related charges. He was sentenced to 15 years in prison on 30 May 2019. Due to his cooperation in testifying against several members of the Sinaloa Cartel, his conviction term was reduced.

== Charges and plea deal ==
Zambada was charged with trafficking more than a billion dollars' worth of cocaine and heroin. In a 2013 plea bargain deal which was made public by a U.S. District Court in 2014, Zambada admitted to coordinating the smuggling of tons of cocaine and heroin with "El Chapo", Joaquín Guzmán Loera, and agreed to forfeit assets of $1.37 billion to the US government. The plea bargain resulted in a fine of $4 million and 15 years in prison. He is considered a top potential witness against "El Chapo."

On 8 November 2018, a plea agreement was filed in the United States District Court for the Northern District of Illinois in which Zambada pleaded guilty to working with El Chapo and others to illegally import thousands of kilos of cocaine into the United States. Zambada and others used private planes, submarines, and speedboats to smuggle drugs from Colombia to Mexico, and then into the United States. In return for Zambada's cooperation, the government recommended more lenient sentencing guidelines and that measures be taken to ensure his family's safety. These included having Zambada and his family be allowed to remain permanently in the United States. He was officially released from US federal custody in April 2021.

== Relationships ==
Jesús Vicente Zambada Niebla is the son of Ismael Zambada García (alias, "El Mayo"), one of the top leaders of the Sinaloa drug-trafficking organization. Vicente Zambada Niebla also has a son named Samael Zambada. Vicente Zambada Niebla is the subject of the book El Traidor by Anabel Hernández.

== See also ==
- List of Mexico's 37 most-wanted drug lords (2009)
- Mérida Initiative
- Mexican drug war
- List of Mexicans
