= El Mayo =

Mexican drug lord (born 1950)

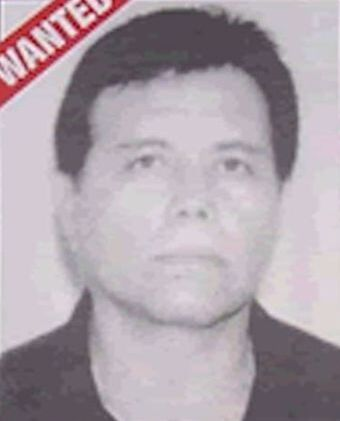
- Zambada García, date unknown
- Born: Ismael Mario Zambada García; 31 January 1950 (age 76); El Álamo, Culiacán Municipality, Sinaloa, México
- Other names: Mayo, M-Z, Padrino, el Señor
- Occupation: Drug lord
- Organization: Sinaloa Cartel
- Predecessor: El Chapo
- Successor: Ismael Zambada Sicairos
- Spouse: Rosario Niebla Cardoza
- Children: At least 8: * Vicente Zambada Niebla, alias "El Vicentillo"; * Ismael Zambada Imperial, alias "Mayito Gordo"; * Serafín Zambada Ortiz, alias "Sera"; * Ismael Zambada Sicairos, alias "El Mayito Flaco"; * María Teresa Zambada Niebla; * Monica del Rosario Zambada Niebla; * Modesta Zambada Niebla; * Antonio Zambada
- Status: Incarcerated
- Penalty: Life imprisonment
- Accomplices: Juan José Esparragoza Moreno and Héctor Luis Palma Salazar

Ismael Mario Zambada García (born 31 January 1950), also known as “El Mayo”, is a Mexican former drug lord and co-founder of the Sinaloa Cartel, an international crime syndicate based in the state of Sinaloa. Before he assumed leadership of the entire cartel, he allegedly served as the logistical coordinator for its Zambada García faction, which has overseen the trafficking of cocaine and heroin into Chicago and other US cities by aircraft, narcosubs, container ships, go-fast boats, fishing vessels, buses, rail cars, tractor trailers, and automobiles.

Until his arrest in July 2024, he had never been arrested or incarcerated. He was arrested in El Paso, Texas, United States, and reported to be in US custody on 25 July 2024. He was arraigned in a Brooklyn based federal court on 13 September 2024. On 25 August 2025, during a court hearing in Brooklyn, he pled guilty to two of the 17 counts he was charged with, one count of racketeering conspiracy and one count of running a continuing criminal enterprise. He was sentenced to life imprisonment on 20 July 2026.

== Career ==
Zambada has historically worked closely with the Juárez Cartel and the Carrillo Fuentes family, while maintaining independent ties to Colombian cocaine suppliers.

In 1989, when Mexican drug lord Miguel Ángel Félix Gallardo was arrested, his organization split into two opposing factions: the Tijuana Cartel whose leadership was inherited by his nephews and heirs, the Arellano Félix brothers and the Sinaloa Cartel whose leadership fell to former lieutenants Héctor Luis Palma Salazar, Adrián Gómez González, Ismael Zambada García, Ignacio Coronel Villarreal, and Joaquín Guzmán Loera (El Chapo). The Sinaloa Cartel drug lords were active in the states of Sinaloa, Durango, Chihuahua, Sonora, Nuevo León, and Nayarit.

Since 1998, Zambada has been wanted by Mexico's attorney general's office, when it issued bounties totaling $2.8 million USD on him and five other leaders of the Juárez Cartel.

In 2006, the administration of President Felipe Calderón launched an offensive against Mexico's drug trafficking networks. The Tijuana Cartel, the largest and most sophisticated of the Mexican cartels at the time, received the brunt of the blows. Taking advantage of the pressure being placed on the Tijuana Cartel, other drug bosses, most notably Ismael Zambada and Joaquín Guzmán, began to encroach on strongholds in northwestern Mexico, leading to full-scale war.

Zambada's organization, the Sinaloa Cartel, receives multi-ton quantities of cocaine, mostly by sea from Colombian sources. It uses a variety of methods, including airplanes, trucks, cars, boats, and tunnels to transport the cocaine to the United States. Members of the cartel smuggle the cocaine to distribution cells in Arizona, Atlanta, California, Illinois, and New York. Zambada has been operating primarily in the states of Sinaloa and Durango, with influence along a large portion of Mexico's Pacific coast, as well as in Quintana Roo, Sonora, and Nuevo León.

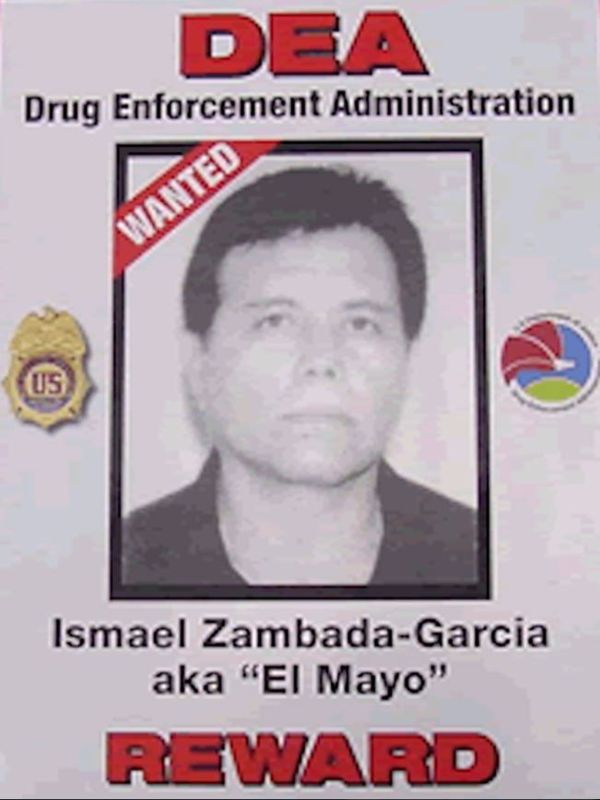
Ismael Zambada's wanted poster in the 2000s

In 2007, Zambada was featured on America's Most Wanted, and the FBI has been offering up to US$5 million for information leading to his capture.

In 2011, it was thought Zambada may have had plastic surgery and disguised himself to move throughout Mexico. Zambada headed the Sinaloa Cartel in partnership with Joaquín "El Chapo" Guzmán until 2016, when El Chapo was captured. Since 2016, Zambada is thought to have assumed full command of the Sinaloa Cartel and to be Mexico's most enduring and powerful drug lord.

In 2019 his son, Vicente Zambada Niebla, testified against Joaquín Guzmán Loera and recounted the shipment of tons of drugs by his father, saying "that his father's bribery budget was often as much as $1 million per month, with bribes going to many high-level Mexican public officials".

During his August 2025 guilty plea, Zambada acknowledged the extent of the Sinaloa Cartel's operations, including underlings who did things such as build relationships with cocaine producers in Colombia, oversee the importation of cocaine to Mexico by boat and plane, and also smuggle drugs across the U.S.-Mexico border. Zambada also acknowledged that people working for him paid bribes to Mexican police and military commanders “so they could operate freely,” with the bribe payments being made even when the Sinoloa Cartel was just starting out.

== Capture ==
On 25 July 2024, Zambada and Joaquín Guzmán López, son of El Chapo (Joaquín Guzmán Loera), were arrested in the US at a private airfield in El Paso, Texas. Zambada was reportedly lured by Guzmán López under false pretenses of looking to buy property in Mexico that led to his arrest. However, both were arrested and are expected to be tried in the US.

== Legal proceedings ==
On 13 September 2024, he had his first hearing at a federal court Brooklyn, New York, where he pleaded "not guilty" to the crimes of drug trafficking, illegal possession of weapons and criminal enterprise.

Zambada's next court date took place on 15 January 2025.

Zambada submitted a petition to the Mexican government requesting extradition to the country to face trial there and an intervention to rule out any death penalty. "No one is defending this person" and "Beyond the person and his crimes, the issue is how he was detained," said President Claudia Sheinbaum regarding the petition review. The Mexican government is also investigating anyone involved in handing over a Mexican citizen to foreign agents to be charged with treason.

=== Guilty plea and apology ===
On 18 August 2025, a court filing revealed that Zambada would now plead guilty to a sweeping number of drug trafficking related charges. Though it was not specified how many of the 17 counts he faced that Zambada would plead guilty to, it confirmed the number would be "sweeping" and that the court hearing where he will officially make this plea will be held on 25 August 2025.

On 25 August 2025, Zambada pled guilty in a Brooklyn federal court to one count of racketeering conspiracy and one count of running a continuing criminal enterprise. While pleading guilty, Zambada also issued an apology, stating that "I recognize the great harm illegal drugs have done to the people in the United States and Mexico" and that "I apologize for all of it, and I take responsibility for my actions."

On 20 July 2026, Zambada was sentenced to life in prison.

== Personal life ==
Zambada is married to Rosario Niebla Cardoza. He has four sons and four daughters. His wife and sons, Serafín Zambada Ortiz (alias "el Sera", as of 2018 arrested and released), and Ismael Zambada Imperial (alias "el Mayito gordo", convicted), as well as his four daughters, María Teresa, Midiam Patricia, Mónica del Rosario, and Modesta, have played an active role in narcotic distribution and money laundering. On 18 March 2009, his son Vicente Zambada Niebla was arrested by the Mexican Army. His other son, Ismael "Mayito" Zambada Jr. has been sought for conspiracy to distribute a controlled substance in the United States.

On 20 October 2010, some of his relatives were arrested in Mexico City on drug trafficking charges: Ismael's brother, Jesús "The King" Zambada, along with Ismael's son and nephew.

On 18 June 2014, his son-in-law, Juan Gabriel González Ibarra, husband of Midiam Patricia, died after suffering an electric shock at his home in Culiacán.

In June 2020, former DEA agent Mike Vigil revealed that Zambada was "sick with diabetes".

On 12 August 2025, El Mayo's son-in-law Juan Carlos Félix Gastélum, also known as “El Chavo Félix,” was extradited to United States from Mexico. On 13 August 2025, “El Chavo Félix” was arraigned in a U.S. federal court in San Diego, California.

== In popular culture ==
=== Television ===
"Don Ismael", a character inspired by Zambada García, was featured in the 2017 television series El Chapo and was portrayed by Diego Vásquez.

El Mayo was introduced as a character in season 3 of Narcos Mexico. The role was portrayed by the Cuban actor Alberto Guerra.

== See also ==
- List of fugitives from justice who disappeared
- List of Mexico's 37 most-wanted drug lords
- Mérida Initiative
- Mexican drug war
- War on drugs
